= List of gods in the Investiture of the Gods =

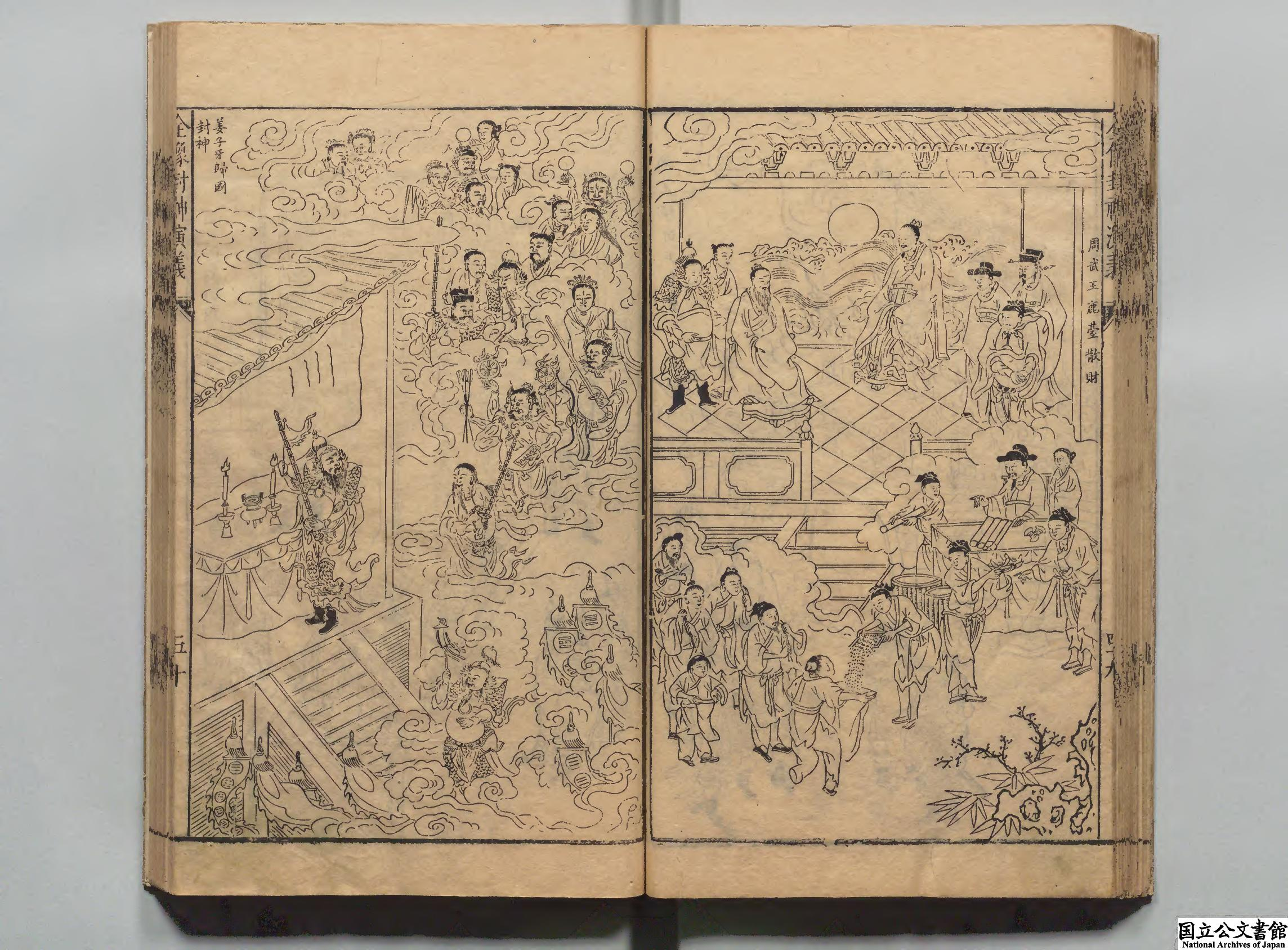
Illustrations of the appointment of the gods and immortals

The classic Chinese novel Investiture of the Gods (also commonly known as Fengshen Yanyi) contains a register of deities (Chinese: 封神榜). According to Fengshen Yanyi, Yuanshi Tianzun ("Primeval Lord of Heaven") bestows upon Jiang Ziya the Fengshen bang (Register of Deities), a list that empowers him to appoint the gods of heaven. Through this power, he elevates the heroes of Zhou and some of their fallen enemies from Shang to heavenly rank, essentially making them gods. This act of deification serves as the central event and inspiration for the novel's title. In some local folktales, the Register of Deities is said to have been left behind by the primordial goddess Nüwa. The register includes 365 gods among the Eight Divisions of Heaven. These figures, upon entering the Fengshen Bang, are granted godhood and are still worshipped in the Taoist pantheon of modern times.

== Background ==
In Fenshen Yanyi, at the Yuxu Palace on Kunlun Mountain, Yuanshi Tianzun suspended his teachings after realizing that his twelve disciples were destined to undergo mortal tribulations. At the same time, the Haotian God sought capable immortals to serve in the Heavenly Court, while the Shang dynasty was nearing its end and the Zhou dynasty was destined to replace it. In response, the Three Teachings, the Chan Sect, the Jie Sect, and the Human Way, compiled the Investiture of the Gods, appointing 365 deities to govern the Heavenly Court. These deities were organized into eight divisions: the Four Upper Divisions (Thunder, Fire, Plague, and the Constellations) and the Four Lower Divisions (the Host of Stars, the Three Mountains and Five Sacred Peaks, the Deities of Rain and Clouds, and the Gods of Good and Evil).

When Jiang Ziya first arrived at Kunlun Mountain, Yuanshi Tianzun ordered the Old Man of the South Pole to hand over the Register of Deities to Jiang Ziya. He also bestowed upon him the Divine Whip and ordered him to build the Platform of Gods on Mount Qi and hang the List of Gods on the platform.

Among those listed on the Register of Deities, there are both loyal ministers and righteous individuals. Some, though not having achieved the path of immortality, have ascended to the ranks of deities. Each spirit possesses varying depths of spiritual development and karmic connections, leading to a hierarchy among the gods. For disciples of the Chan Sect and the Jie Sect, those with the highest level of Dao cultivation ascended to full godhood upon entering the Register of Deities. Those with lesser cultivation became immortals or divine beings, while those with the weakest cultivation were reborn into the cycle of reincarnation. Some disciples also joined Western Buddhism, including the Chan Sect's Cihang Zhenren (later known as Guanyin), Wenshu Guangfa Tianzun (later known as Manjushri), and Puxian Zhenren (later known as Samantabhadra). Even the soul of the antagonist, King Zhou of Shang, was sealed as the Tian Xixing ("Star of Heavenly Happiness"). As Tian Xixing, he bore the responsibility of managing the marriage affairs of humans. Jiang Ziya maintained that King Zhou's consciousness did not engage in any wrongdoing or bad practices. According to Jiang Ziya, all the nefarious deeds throughout history were orchestrated under the influence of the nine-tailed fox, Daji, and thus, all the sins were attributed solely to her. However, some characters, such as Li family members Li Jing, Nezha, Jinzha, and Muzha, as well as Yan Jian and Leizhenzi, did not enter the list of gods, but they became more popular deities than the ones listed.

There are significant discrepancies in the names and lists of gods recorded between the Shu edition (the original handwritten manuscript version) and the Tongxing edition (a widely printed version) of the Fengshen Yanyi, especially in Chapters 99 and 100. In the 99th chapter, the Shu edition lists 363 righteous gods and then adds Fei Lian and A Lai, two ministers, in the 100th chapter, bringing the total to 365 gods. On the other hand, the Tongxing edition lists 365 righteous gods in the 99th chapter and adds the Four Heavenly Kings and the Hengha Erjiang ("Two Roaring and Laughing Warriors") in the 100th chapter, resulting in a total of 371 gods.

The Shu version excludes the Four Heavenly Kings and the Hengha Erjiang because of their affiliation with the Buddha's Western Pure Land sect. These figures, who served as assistants to the Western Pure Land teaching and guardians of the Western Buddhist Mountain Gate, are not considered deities in the traditional sense.

== Variations ==
In the original text of Newly Engraved Mr. Zhong Bojing's Critiqued Investiture of the Gods (新刻钟伯敬先生批评封神演义), preserved by the National Library of China, several names in the Investiture Roster differ from those found in later popular editions. The deity appointed as the "Moon Wandering Star" (月游星) is Liang Zongxian rather than Shiji Niangniang. Likewise, the "Canopy Star" (华盖星) is Zhang Ding instead of Ao Bing, the "Great Disaster Star" (大祸星) is Chen Meng instead of the sea-patrolling yaksha Li Gen, the "Nine Ugliness Star" (九丑星) is Yao Xuan instead of Longxuhu, and the "Four Wastes Star" (四废星) is Yuan Kun instead of Yuan Hong.

== Missing names in the list ==
Two characters are stated in the novel to have been deified, but their names do not appear in either version of the list of gods. They are Caiyun Xianzi and the demons Gaoming and Gaojue. Caiyun Xianzi is a disciple of Sanxiao Shengmu (Zhao Yunxiao, Zhao Qiongxiao, and Zhao Bixiao). After the death of Zhao Gongming, she joined her teacher in supporting Wen Zhong's campaign against Xiqi. When the Nine-Curves Yellow River Formation (九曲黄河阵) was broken, Nezha killed Caiyun Xianzi with his spear. The novel states that her soul entered the Register of Deities, but her name does not appear in either version of the god list.

Gaoming and Gaojue are peach and willow spirits from Mount Qipan. After acquiring the spiritual power of the clay statues of the Thousand-Li Eye and the Wind-Hearing Ear, they gained supernatural sight and hearing. King Zhou appointed them as generals, and they later joined Yuan Hong in resisting the Zhou army at Mengjin. Following the advice of Yuding Zhenren, Jiang Ziya ordered Li Jing to destroy their original peach and willow trees, while Leizhenzi smashed the clay statues from which they drew their power. Jiang Ziya then killed them with his divine whip. Although the novel states that they were deified as Shentu and Yulei, their names are absent from both versions of the god list.

== Influence ==
The gods and immortals from Fengshen Yanyi influenced Chinese folk religion. After the novel was published, many folk beliefs came to follow its depiction of the heavenly court, changing the traditional hierarchy of Chinese gods. The novel also merged many traditional deities with its fictional characters. For example, Emperor Dongyue came to be identified with the Shang general Huang Feihu. Likewise, Bi Gan became associated with Wenquxing, the constellation believed to influence literary talent, and was invoked by scholars seeking success in the imperial examinations.Zhao Gongming also came to be recognized as the God of Wealth, while his four lieutenants were believed to oversee the accumulation of wealth and treasure.

The roster of deities also illustrates the intensification of god-making (zao shen; 造神) during the Yuan and Ming dynasties.

According to local tradition, the ruins of the Platform of Gods (fengshentai; 封神台), where Jiang Ziya is said to have appointed the gods, are located near Shandi Village in Huangdui Township, Fufeng County, Baoji, Shaanxi. Local accounts state that the deities named in the Investiture of the Gods were once enshrined there, but the statues were destroyed during the Cultural Revolution. A replica of the Platform of Gods has since been built on the site and is now a tourist attraction. Many statues of gods now stand before the site.

== Analysis ==
In an analysis published by The Beijing News, Liu Bo notes that one of the unique ideas in the cosmology of Investiture of the Gods is the clear difference and hierarchy between an "Immortal" (仙, Xian) and a "God" (神, Shen). In the novel, becoming a "God" is not shown as a higher achievement, but rather as a lower status and a form of punishment. He explains that Immortals are beings who have reached enlightenment and achieved "meat-body sanctification" (肉身成圣). They keep their physical bodies, freedom, and independence from the heavenly bureaucracy. In contrast, Gods are those who failed to become Immortals, died in battle, and were later placed on the Investiture Roster. After becoming Gods, they serve as powerful spirits working as officials under the Haotian God. Because of this, the "Investiture of the Gods" is not seen as a reward by the characters, but as a fate that practitioners from both sects try to avoid.

Shi Jingjing, a senior reporter for South Reviews (南风窗), argues that Investiture of the Gods portrays Nüwa's revenge against King Zhou as the catalyst for the Shang dynasty's fall. She also contends that the novel's ending is morally ambiguous because its final list of deified figures does not distinguish between good and evil or between right and wrong.

== List of gods ==
The 365 names of the righteous gods are listed below, though they might vary in two versions of the book.

=== God of Good Fortune ===
- The Three Realms Leader of the Eight Divisions and Three Hundred Sixty-Five Qingfu Gods: (Note: The translation of "清福神" as "Qingfu God" is a literal translation. It is also possible to translate it as "God of Tranquil Bliss" or "God of Serenity and Happiness.") Baijian (Note: Baijian is a god who is in charge of leading the souls of the dead to the Heavenly Court. He is the first god to be named in the Fengshen Bang.)

=== Three Mountains and Five Peaks ===
God of the Three Sacred Mountains

- Bingling Gong: Huang Tianhua

Five Peaks

- East Peak Taishan, Tianqi Rensheng Great Emperor: Huang Feihu
- South Peak Hengshan, Sishen Zhaosheng Great Emperor: Chong Heihu
- Central Peak Songshan, Zhongtian Chongsheng Great Emperor: Wen Pin
- North Peak Hengshan, Antian Xuansheng Great Emperor: Cui Ying
- West Peak Huashan, Jintian Yuansheng Great Emperor: Jiang Xiong

=== The Twenty-Four Heavenly Generals of the Thunder Department ===
Ninth Heaven Thunderclap Universal Manifestation Heavenly Venerable: Wen Zhong (Head of Thunder Gods)

Ten Heavenly Generals of Jin'ao Island

- Deng Tianjun Zhong: Deng Zhong
- Xin Tianjun Huan: Xin Huan
- Zhang Tianjun Jie: Zhang Jie
- Tao Tianjun Rong: Tao Rong
- Pang Tianjun Hong: Pang Hong
- Liu Tianjun Fu: Liu Fu
- Guo Tianjun Zhang: Guo Zhang
- Bi Tianjun Huan: Bi Huan
- Qin Tianjun Wan: Qin Wan
- Zhao Tianjun Jiang: Zhao Jiang

Four Heavenly Generals of Huanghua Mountain

- Dong Tianjun Quan: Dong Quan
- Yuan Tianjun Jiao: Yuan Jiao
- Li Tianjun De: Li De
- Sun Tianjun Liang: Sun Liang

Four Heavenly Generals of Erlong Mountain

- Bo Tianjun Li: Bo Li
- Wang Tianjun Yi: Wang Yi
- Yao Tianjun Bin: Yao Bin
- Zhang Tianjun Shao: Zhang Shao

Two Personal Attendants of Wen Zhong

- Jin Tianjun Su: Jin Su
- Ji Tianjun Li: Ji Li

Heavenly Generals Who Died in the Battle of Wanxian

- Yu Tianjun Qing: Yu Qing

Thunder Deities

- Lightning God: Jinguang Shengmu
- Wind Assisting God: Hanzhixian
- Cloud Rising God: Caiyunxian

=== Fire Department Deities ===
Lord of Fire Deities

- Luo Xuan

Five Fire Gods

- Tailed Fire Tiger: Zhu Zhao
- Room Fire Pig: Gao Zhen
- Mouth Fire Monkey: Fang Gui
- Winged Fire Snake: Wang Jiao
- God of Fire: Liu Huan

=== Plague Department Deities ===
Plague Emperor

- Lü Yue

Plague Gods (Note: In Chinese mythology, the Plague Department is often seen as a negative force. However, it is also important to remember that the Plague Department is also responsible for maintaining balance in the world. Without disease, the population would grow too large, and the world would become unsustainable.)

- Plague Messenger of the East: Zhou Xin
- Plague Messenger of the South: Li Qi
- Plague Messenger of the West: Zhu Tianlin
- Plague Messenger of the North: Yang Wenhui
- Master of Benevolence: Chen Geng
- Daoist of Harmony: Li Ping

=== Dipper Department ===
Honorable Goddess of the North Pole Dippers

- Jinling Shengmu

Great Emperor of Central Heaven, North Pole, and Ziwei Palace

- Bo Yikao

The Eastern Dipper Star Officials

- Su Hu
- Jin Kui
- Ji Shu Ming
- Zhao Bing

The Western Dipper Star Officials

- Huang Tianlu
- Long Huan
- Sun Ziyu
- Hu Sheng
- Hu Yunpeng

The Central Dipper Star Officials

- Lu Renjie
- Chao Lei
- Ji Shusheng

The Southern Dipper Star Officials

- Zhou Ji
- Hu Lei
- Gao Gui
- Yu Cheng
- Sun Bao
- Lei Kun

The Northern Dipper Star Officials

- Huang Tianxiang (Tiangang)
- Bi Gan (Wenqu)
- Dou Rong (Wuqu)
- Han Sheng (Zuofu)
- Han Bian (Youbi)
- Su Quanzhong (Pojun)
- E Shun (Tanlang)
- Guo Chen (Jumen)
- Dong Zhong (Zhaoyao)

Constellations Gods

- Qing Longxing (青龍星): Deng Jiugong
- Bai Huxing (白虎星): Yin Chengxiu
- Zhu Quxing (朱雀星): Ma Fang
- Xuan Wuxing (玄武星): Xu Kun
- Gou Chenxing (勾陳星): Lei Peng (In Shu version, "Sun Bo")
- Teng Shexing (滕蛇星): Zhang Shan
- Tai Yangxing (太陽星): Xu Gai
- Tai Yinxing (太陰星): Queen Jiang
- Yu Tangxing (玉堂星): Shang Rong
- Tian Guixing (天貴星): Ji Shuqian
- Long Dexing (龍德星): Hong Jin
- Hong Luanxing (紅鸞星): Princess Longji
- Tian Xixing (天喜星): King Zhou
- Tian Dexing (天德星): Mei Bo
- Yue Dexing (月德星): Xia Zhao
- Tian Shexing (天赦星): Zhao Qi
- Mao Duanxing (貌端星): Lady Jia (the wife of Huang Feihu)
- Jin Fuxing (金府星): Xiao Zhen (in Shu version "Chen Ding")
- Mu Fuxing (木府星): Deng Hua (In Shu version, "Lu Shen")
- Shui Fuxing (水府星): Yu Yuan (In Shu version, "Yu Can")
- Huo Fuxing (火府星): Huoling Shengmu (In Shu version, "Wang Zhen")
- Tu Fuxing (土府星): Tu Xingsun
- Liu Hexing (六合星): Deng Chanyu
- Bo Shixing (博士星): Du Yuanxian (In Shu version, "Xing Sanyi")
- Li Shixing (力士星): Wu Wenhua (In Shu version, "Dai Li")
- Zou Shuxing (奏書星): Jiao Ge (In Shu version, "Che Fang")
- He Kuixing (河魁星): Huang Feibiao (In Shu version, "Zhai Yuan")
- Yue Kuixing (月魁星): Chedi Furen (In Shu version, "Cui Shijie")
- Di Chexing (帝車星): Jiang Huanchu (In Shu version, "Xu Zhen")
- Tian Sixing (天嗣星): Huang Feibao (In Shu version, "Shi Zhang")
- Di Luxing (帝輅星): Ding Ce
- Tian Maxing (天馬星): E Chongyu (In Shu version, "Pang Hu")
- Huang Enxing (皇恩星): Li Jin
- Tian Yixing (天醫星): Qian Bao
- Di Houxing (地后星): Queen Huang, consort of King Zhou
- Zhai Longxing (宅龍星): Ji Shude
- Fu Longxing (伏龍星): Huang Ming
- Yi Maxing (驛馬星): Lei Kai
- Huang Fanxing (黃旛星): Wei Ben
- Bao Weixing (豹尾星): Wu Qian (In Shu version, "Zheng Long")
- Sang Menxing (喪門星): Zhang Guifang
- Diao Kexing (弔客星): Feng Lin
- Gou Jiaoxing (勾絞星): Fei Zhong
- Juan Shexing (卷舌星): You Hun
- Luo Houxing (羅睺星): Peng Zun
- Ji Douxing (計都星): Wang Bao
- Fei Lianxing (飛廉星): Ji Shukun
- Da Haoxing (大耗星): Chong Houhu
- Xiao Haoxing (小耗星): Yin Pobai
- Guan Suoxing (貫索星): Qiu Yin (In Shu version, "Qin Geng")
- Lan Gangxing (欄桿星): Long Anji
- Pi Touxing (披頭星): Tai Luan
- Wu Guxing (五鬼星): Deng Xiu
- Yang Renxing (羊刃星): Zhao Sheng
- Xue Guangxing (血光星): Sun Yanhong (In Shu version, "Sun Hongyan")
- Guan Fuxing (官符星): Fang Yizhen
- Gu Chenxing (孤辰星): Yu Hua
- Tian Gouxing (天狗星): Ji Kang
- Bing Fuxing (病符星): Wang Zuo
- Zuan Guxing (鑽骨星): Zhang Feng (In Shu version, "Cui Xin")
- Si Fuxing (死符星): Bian Jinlong
- Tian Baixing (天敗星): Bai Xianzhong (In Shu version, "Ba Baixing: Bai Zhong")
- Fu Chenxing (浮沉星): Zheng Chun
- Tian Shaxing (天殺星): Bian Ji (In Shu version, "Da Shaxing: Ding Ce")
- Sui Shaxing (歲殺星): Chen Geng (In Shu version, "Li Xiong")
- Sui Xingxing (歲刑星): Xu Fang (Chuanyun General)
- Sui Poxing (歲破星): Chao Tian
- Zhuo Huoxing (燭火星): Ji Shuyi
- Xue Guangxing (血光星): Ma Zhong
- Wang Shenxing (亡神星): Ouyang Chun (Lintong General) (Shu's original version "Ouyang Ping")
- Yue Poxing (月破星): Wang Hu (In Shu version, "Wang Bin")
- Yue Youxing (月遊星): Shi Jiniang (In Shu version, "Liang Zongxian")
- Si Qixing (死氣星): Chen Jizhen (In Shu version, "Chen Liliang")
- Xian Chixing (咸池星): Xu Zhong (In Shu version, "Chi Zhong")
- Yue Yanxing (月厭星): Yao Zhong (In Shu version, "Sun An")
- Yue Xingxing (月刑星): Chen Wu (In Shu version, "Li De")
- Hei Shaxing (黑殺星): Gao Jine
- Qi Shaxing (七殺星): Zhang Kui
- Wu Guxing (五谷星): Yin Hong
- Chu Shaxing (除殺星): Yu Zhong (In Shu version, "Huang Dingchen")
- Tian Xingxing (天刑星): Ouyang Tianlu (In Shu version, "Yang Chun")
- Tian Luoxing (天羅星): Chen Tong (In Shu version, "Zhu Yin")
- Di Wangxing (地網星): Ji Shuji
- Tian Kongxing (天空星): Mei Wu (In Shu version, "Qian Jing")
- Hua Gaixing (華蓋星): Ao Bing (In Shu version, "Zhang Ding")
- Shi Exing (十惡星): Zhou Xin (In Shu version, "Li Dewu")
- Can Xuxing (蠶畜星): Huang Yuanji (In Shu version, "Hu Jiashan")
- Tao Huaxing (桃花星): Gao Lanying
- Sao Buxing (掃帚星): Lady Ma (Jiang Ziya's wife) (In Shu version, "Iron Broom Lady Ma")
- Da Huoxing (大禍星): Li Gen (In Shu version, "Chen Meng")
- Lang Jixing (狼籍星): Han Rong
- Pi Maxing (披麻星): Lin Shan (In Shu version, "Jin Geng")
- Jiu Chouxing (九醜星): Long Xuhu (In Shu version, "Yao Xuan")
- San Shixing (三屍星): Sa Jian, Sa Qiang, Sa Yong
- Yin Chuoxing (陰錯星): Jin Cheng (In Shu version, "Jin Hai")
- Yang Chaxing (陽差星): Ma Chenglong (In Shu version, "Wang Bao")
- Ren Shaxing (刃殺星): Gongsun Duo
- Si Feixing (四廢星): Yuan Hong (In Shu version, "Yuan Kun")
- Wu Qiongxing (五窮星): Sun He (In Shu version, "Shi Siqi")
- Di Kongxing (地空星): Mei De (In Shu version, "Hong Chengxiu")
- Hong Yanxing (紅艷星): Queen Yang, consort of King Zhou (In Shu version, "Wang Yi")
- Liu Xiaxing (流霞星): Wu Rong (In Shu version, "Yang Xiang")
- Gua Suxing (寡宿星): Zhu Sheng (In Shu version, "Zhang Wei")
- Tian Wenxing (天瘟星): Jin Dasheng (In Shu version, "Cheng Chaoyong")
- Huang Wuxing (荒蕪星): Dai Li (In Shu version, "Zhao Guocai")
- Tai Shenxing (胎神星): Ji Shuli
- Fu Duanxing (伏斷星): Zhu Zizhen (In Shu version, "Li Yan")
- Fan Yinxing (反吟星): Yang Xian (In Shu version, "Zhou Bo")
- Fu Yinxing (伏吟星): Yao Shuliang (In Shu version, "Lu Zhiben")
- Dao Zhenxing (刀砧星): Chang Hao (In Shu version, "Hu Song")
- Mie Moxing (滅沒星): Fang Jingyuan
- Sui Yanxing (歲厭星): Peng Zushou (In Shu version, "Yang Wang")
- Po Suixing (破碎星): Wu Long (In Shu version, "Yu Zongbo")

Gods of the 28 Mansions

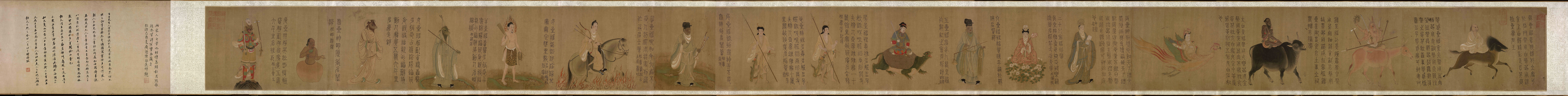
"The Five Stars and 28 Heavenly Abodes" by Zhang Sengyou, Liang dynasty (5-6th century), in the Osaka City Museum of Fine Arts
- Azure Dragon of the East (東方青龍)
  - Wood Dragon of Horn (角木蛟): Bai Lin
  - Golden Dragon of Neck (亢金龍): Li Daotong
  - Earth Badger of Root (氐土貉): Gao Bing
  - Sun Rabbit of Room (房日兔): Yao Gongbo
  - Moon Vixen of Heart (心月狐): Su Yuan
  - Fire Tiger of Tail (尾火虎): Zhu Zhao
  - Water Leopard of Winnowing Basket (箕水豹): Yang Zhen
- Black Tortoise of the North (北方玄武)
  - Wood Insect of Dipper (斗木獬): Yang Xin
  - Golden Ox of Ox (牛金牛): Li Hong
  - Earth Bat of Girl (Nü Tofu, 女土蝠): Zheng Yuan
  - Sun Rat of Emptiness (虛日鼠): Zhou Bao
  - Moon Swallow of Rooftop (危月燕): Hou Taiyi
  - Fire Pig of Encampment (室火豬): Gao Zhen
  - Water Pangolin of Wall (壁水貐): Fang Jiqing
- White Tiger of the West (西方白虎)
  - Wood Wolf of Legs (Kui Mulang, 奎木狼): Li Xiong
  - Golden Dog of Bond (婁金狗): Zhang Xiong
  - Earth Pheasant of Stomach (胃土雉): Song Geng
  - Sun Rooster of Hairy Head (Maori Xingguan, 昴日雞): Huang Cang
  - Moon Bird of Net (畢月烏): Jin Shengyang
  - Fire Monkey of Turtle Beak (觜火猴): Fang Gui
  - Water Ape of Three Stars (參水猿): Sun Xiang
- Vermilion Bird of the South (南方朱雀)
  - Wood Dog of Well (井木犴): Shen Geng
  - Golden Sheep of Ghost (鬼金羊): Zhao Baigao
  - Earth Deer of Willow (柳土獐): Wu Kun
  - Sun Horse of Star (星日馬): Lü Neng
  - Moon Deer of Extended Net (張月鹿): Xue Ding
  - Fire Serpent of Wings (翼火蛇): Wang Jiao
  - Water Earthworm of Chariot (軫水蚓): Hu Daoyuan

The 36 Stars of the Dipper (Note: In Chinese mythology, the 36 Stars of the Dipper are a group of celestial beings associated with the Big Dipper constellation. They are divided into two groups: the Heavenly Spears (天罡星, Tiānggāng Xīng) and the Heavenly Gourds (天魁星, Tiānkuí Xīng). The Heavenly Spears are considered the more powerful of the two groups, led by Grand Marshal Huang Zhen (黃真, Huáng Zhēn), also known as the Great King of the Dipper (天罡大帝, Tiānggāng Dàdì). The Heavenly Gourds are considered the less powerful of the two groups, led by Grand Marshal Gao Yan (高衍, Gāo Yán), also known as the Great King of the Gourds (天魁大帝, Tiānkuí Dàdì).)

- Tian Kuixing (天魁星): Gao Yan
- Tian Gangxing (天罡星): Huang Zhen
- Tian Jixing (天機星): Lu Chang
- Tian Xianxing (天閒星): Ji Bing
- Tian Yongxing (天勇星): Yao Gongxiao
- Tian Xiongxing (天雄星): Shi Gui
- Tian Mengxing (天猛星): Sun Yi
- Tian Weixing (天威星): Li Bao
- Tian Yingxing (天英星): Zhu Yi
- Tian Guixing (天貴星): Chen Kan
- Tian Fuxing (天富星): Li Xian
- Tian Manxing (天滿星): Fang Bao
- Tian Guxing (天孤星): Zhan Xiu
- Tian Shangxing (天傷星): Li Hongren
- Tian Xuanxing (天玄星): Wang Longmao
- Tian Jianxing (天建星): Deng Yu
- Tian Anxing (天暗星): Li Xin
- Tian Youxing (天祐星): Xu Zhengdao
- Tian Kongxing (天空星): Dian Tong
- Tian Suxing (天速星): Wu Xu
- Tian Yixing (天異星): Lu Zicheng
- Tian Shaxing (天煞星): Ren Laipin
- Tian Weixing (天微星): Gong Qing
- Tian Jiuxing (天究星): Shan Baizhao
- Tian Tuixing (天退星): Gao Ke
- Tian Shouxing (天壽星): Qi Cheng
- Tian Jianxing (天劍星): Wang Hu
- Tian Pingxing (天平星): Bu Tong
- Tian Zuixing (天罪星): Yao Gong
- Tian Sunxing (天損星): Tang Tianzheng
- Tian Baixing (天敗星): Shen Li
- Tian Laoxing (天牢星): Wen Jie
- Tian Huixing (天慧星): Zhang Zhixiong
- Tian Baoxing (天暴星): Bi De
- Tian Kuixing (天魁星): Liu Da
- Tian Qiaoxing (天巧星): Cheng Sanyi

The Seventy-Two Earthly Fiend Stars of the Dipper

- Di Kuixing (地魁星): Chen Jizhen
- Di Shaxing (地煞星): Huang Jingyuan
- Di Yongxing (地勇星): Jia Cheng
- Di Jiexing (地傑星): Hu Baiyan
- Di Xiongxing (地雄星): Lu Xiude
- Di Weixing (地威星): Xu Cheng
- Di Yingxing (地英星): Sun Xiang
- Di Qixing (地奇星): Wang Ping
- Di Mengxing (地猛星): Bai Youhuan
- Di Wenxing (地文星): Ge Gao
- Di Zhengxing (地正星): Kao Ge
- Di Pixing (地闢星): Li Sui
- Di Hexing (地闔星): Liu Heng
- Di Qiangxing (地強星): Xia Xiang
- Di Anxing (地暗星): Yu Hui
- Di Zhouxing (地軸星): Bao Long
- Di Huixing (地會星): Lu Zhi
- Di Zuoxing (地佐星): Huang Bingqing
- Di Youxing (地祐星): Zhang Qi
- Di Lingxing (地靈星): Guo Si
- Di Shouxing (地獸星): Jin Nandao
- Di Weixing (地微星): Chen Yuan
- Di Huixing (地慧星): Che Kun
- Di Baoxing (地暴星): Sang Chengdao
- Di Moxing (地默星): Zhou Geng
- Di Changxing (地猖星): Qi Gong
- Di Kuangxing (地狂星): Huo Zhiyuan
- Di Feixing (地飛星): Ye Zhong
- Di Zouxing (地走星): Gu Zong
- Di Qiaoxing (地巧星): Li Chang
- Di Mingxing (地明星): Fang Ji
- Di Jinxing (地進星): Xu Ji
- Di Tuixing (地退星): Fan Huan
- Di Manxing (地滿星): Zhuo Gong
- Di Suixing (地遂星): Kong Cheng
- Di Zhouxing (地周星): Yao Jinxiu
- Di Yinxing (地隱星): Ning Sanyi
- Di Yixing (地異星): Yu Zhi
- Di Lixing (地理星): Tong Zhen
- Di Junxing (地俊星): Yuan Dingxiang
- Di Lexing (地樂星): Wang Xiang
- Di Jiexing (地捷星): Geng Yan
- Di Suxing (地速星): Xing Sanluan
- Di Zhenxing (地鎮星): Jiang Zhong
- Di Jixing (地羈星): Kong Tianzhao
- Di Moxing (地魔星): Li Yue
- Di Yaoxing (地妖星): Gong Qian
- Di Youxing (地幽星): Duan Qing
- Di Fuxing (地伏星): Men Daozheng
- Di Pixing (地僻星): Zu Lin
- Di Kongxing (地空星): Xiao Dian
- Di Guxing (地孤星): Wu Siyu
- Di Quanxing (地全星): Kuang Yu
- Di Duanxing (地短星): Cai Gong
- Di Jiaoxing (地角星): Lan Hu
- Di Qiuxing (地囚星): Song Lu
- Di Zangxing (地藏星): Guan Bin
- Di Pingxing (地平星): Long Cheng
- Di Sunxing (地損星): Huang Wu
- Di Nuxing (地奴星): Kong Daoling
- Di Chaxing (地察星): Zhang Huan
- Di Exing (地惡星): Li Xin
- Di Hunxing (地魂星): Xu Shan
- Di Shuxing (地數星): Ge Fang
- Di Yinxing (地陰星): Jiao Long
- Di Xingxing (地刑星): Qin Xiang
- Di Zhuangxing (地壯星): Wu Yangong
- Di Liexing (地劣星): Fan Bin
- Di Jianxing (地健星): Ye Jingchang
- Di Haoxing (地耗星): Yao Ye
- Di Zeixing (地賊星): Sun Ji
- Di Gouxing (地狗星): Chen Menggeng

The Nine Luminaries of the Dipper Division

- Chong Yingbiao (Tian Kui Star)
- Gao Xiping (Tian Yue Star)
- Han Peng (Tian Shu Star)
- Li Ji (Tian Xuan Star)
- Wang Feng (Tian Ji Star)
- Liu Jin (Tian Quan Star)
- Wang Chu (Tian Heng Star)
- Peng Jiuyuan (Tian Xiang Star)
- Li Sanyi (Tian Ji Star)

The Five Elements Water Virtue Stars of the Northern Dipper (Note: In the Taoist mythology, the Five Elements Water Virtue Stars of the Northern Dipper are important subordinates of the Water God. They are ordered by the Great Emperor of the Seven Stars of the Northern Dipper to be responsible for governing water-related matters and protecting the world from natural disasters.)

- The Water Virtue Star: Lu Xiong (Leader of the four righteous gods of the water department)
- The Water Leopard of the Ji constellation: Yang Zhen
- The Water Crocodile of the Bi constellation: Fang Jiqing
- The Water Monkey of the Can constellation: Sun Xiang
- The Water Earthworm of the Zhen constellation: Hu Daoyuan

=== Tai Sui Department ===
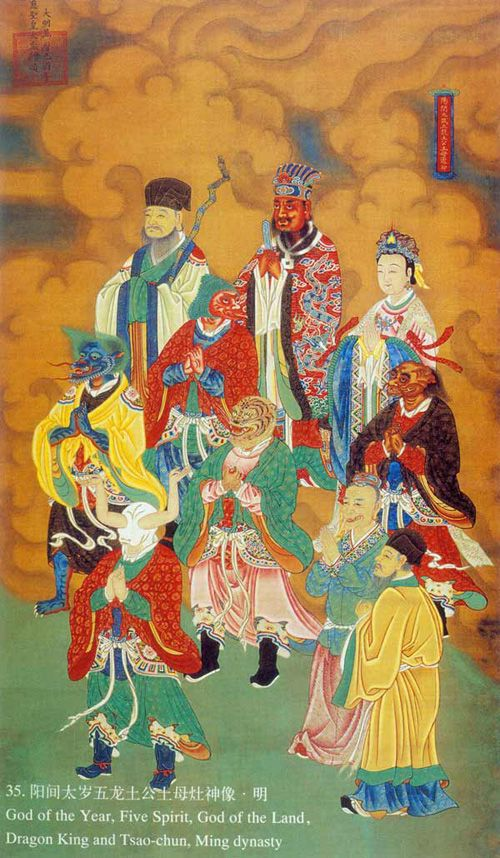
Tai Sui Gods

- The Lord of the Year: Yin Jiao
- Jiazi Taisui: Yang Ren

Stars of the Day under the Tai Sui Department

- The Day Patrolling God: Wen Liang
- The Night Patrolling God: Qiao Kun
- The God of Increasing Fortune: Han Dulong
- The God of Decreasing Fortune: Xue Ehu
- The God of Manifesting the Way: Fang Bi
- The God of Opening the Way: Fang Xiang
- The God of the Year: Li Bing
- The God of the Month: Huang Chengyi
- The God of the Day: Zhou Deng
- The God of the Hour: Liu Hong

=== Four Holy Grand Marshals ===
The Four Marshals who guard the Lingxiao Palace are,

- Wang Mo (王魔)
- Yang Sen (楊森)
- Gao Tiqian (高體乾)
- Li Xingba (李興霸)

=== Jinlong Ruyi God (God of Wealth) ===
- Jinlong Ruyi Zhengyi Longhu Xuantan Zhenjun: Zhao Gongming

Four Subordinate Deities

- Zhaobao Tianzun: Xiao Sheng
- Nazhen Tianzun: Cao Bao
- Zhaocai Shizhe: Chen Jiugong
- Lishui Xianguan: Yao Shaosi

=== Four Heavenly Kings ===
- Virūḍhaka: Moli Qing
- Virūpākṣa: Moli Hong
- Vaiśravaṇa: Moli Hai
- Dhṛtarāṣṭra: Moli Shou

=== Heng and Ha, the Two Generals ===
Hengha Erjiang are two deities who guard the Western Mountain Gate of the Buddhist paradise.

- Zheng Lun
- Chen Qi

=== Smallpox Gods ===
- Zhudou Biqia Yangjun: Yu Hualong
- Weifang Shengmu Yangjun: Lady Jin (Wife of Yu Hualong)

The Five Lords of Smallpox

- Lord of Smallpox of the East: Yu Da
- Lord of Smallpox of the West: Yu Zhao
- Lord of Smallpox of the South: Yu Guang
- LordYu De of Smallpox of the North: Yu Xian
- Lord of Smallpox of the center: Yu De

=== Sensitivity and Harmony Celestial Ladies ===
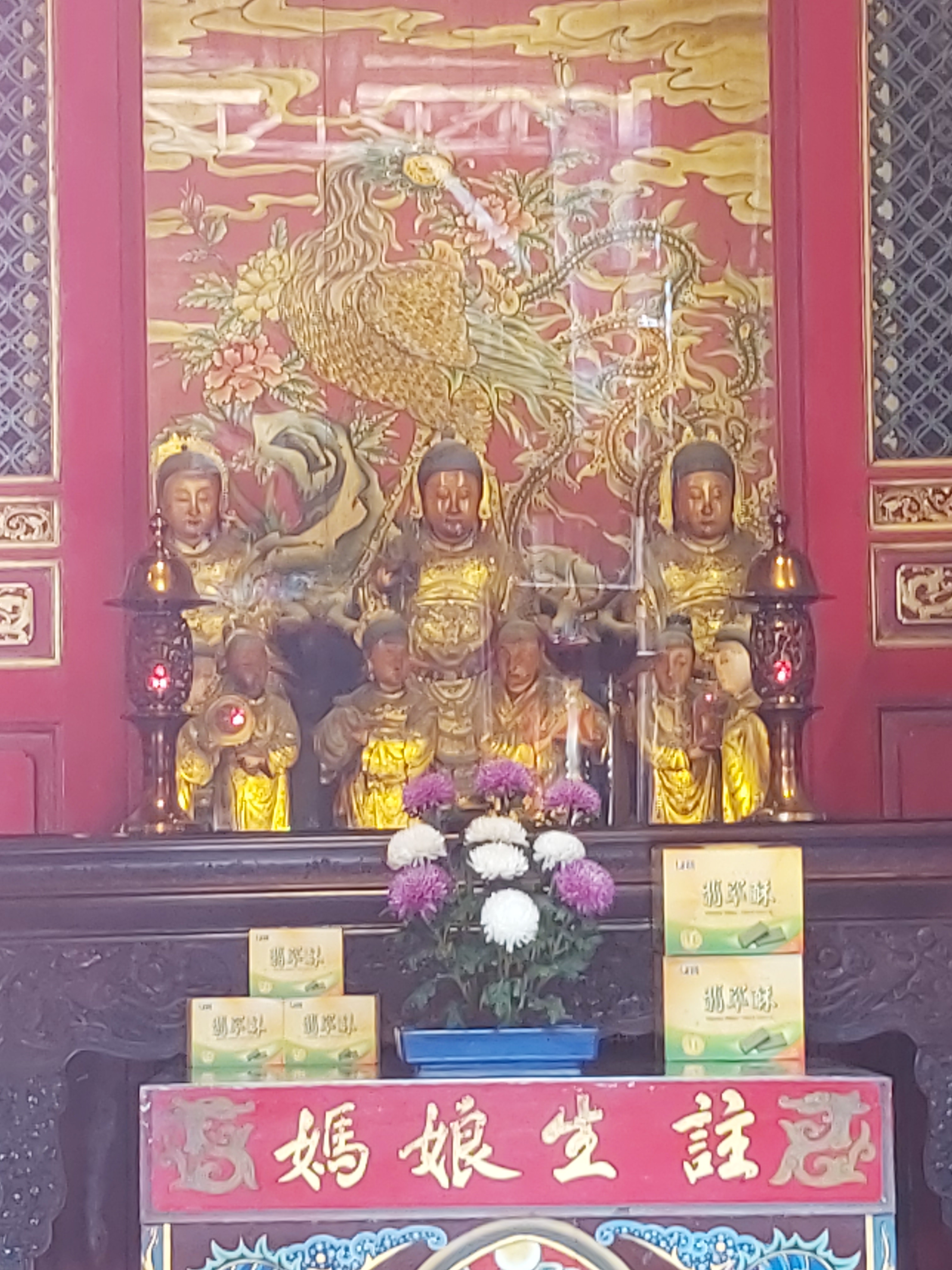
Sanxiao Shengmu in Mengjia Longshan Temple, Taipei

- Yunxiao Niangniang
- Qiongxiao Niangniang
- Bixiao Niangniang

=== The General of East Sea ===
- Shen Gongbao

=== The God of Ice Dissolution ===
- Fei Lian
- A-lai

== See also ==
- List of media adaptations of the Investiture of the Gods
