= Sāgara (Dragon King) =

Figure in Mahayana Buddhism

Dragon King Sāgara
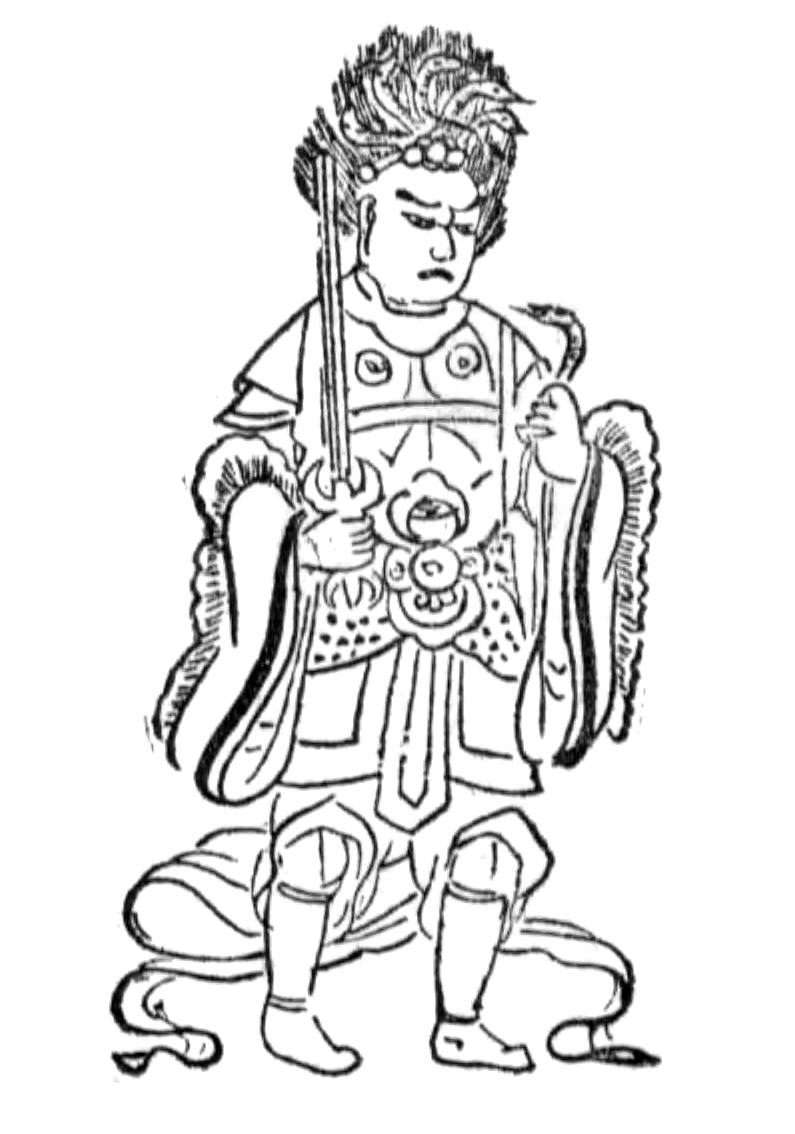
- Sanskrit: सागरनागराज; Sāgaranāgarāja
- Chinese: 娑竭羅龍王 娑伽羅龍王 沙羯羅龍王 (Pinyin: Suōjiéluó Lóngwáng or Suōjiāluó Lóngwáng or Shājiéluó Lóngwáng)
- Japanese: 娑竭羅竜王 娑伽羅竜王 沙羯羅竜王 (romaji: Shagara Ō or Shakara Ō)
- Korean: 사갈라용왕 (RR: Sagalla Yongwang)
- Tagalog: Sagala
- Tibetan: ཀླུའི་རྒྱལ་པོ་རྒྱ་མཚོ། Wylie: klu’i rgyal po rgya mtsho
- Vietnamese: Sa Già La Long Vương; Sa Kiệt La Long Vương

Information
- Venerated by: Mahāyāna: (Dīrgha Āgama); (Lotus Sutra); (Avataṃsaka Sūtra); (Golden Light Sutra); (Mahāyāna Abhisamaya Sūtra) (大乘同性經); (Daśabhadrakarmamārga Sūtra) (十善業道經); (Sāgaranāgarājaparipṛcchā Sūtra); (Mahāmāyūrī Vidyārājñī Sūtra)
- Attributes: Nāga King; God of rain

Sāgara is a prominent nāgarāja or dragon king in Mahayana Buddhism. His name comes from the Sanskrit word meaning “ocean.”

== Character ==
Sāgara is listed among the Eight Great Dragon Kings and is one of sixteen that are spared from the assault of the garudas. His frequent inclusion of Sāgara among the several groups of protective deities in Buddhism is a direct reference to the nāgas and his role as one of their primary leaders. He is listed among the 28 guardians of the thousand-armed Avalokiteśvara.

The Avataṃsaka Sūtra reveals that he is the nāga that presides over the world's supply of rain.

In East Asian art, he is often depicted with a reddish white complexion and assumes a posture of great authority. In his left hand he holds a snake or dragon and in his right hand he wields a sword. He wears a crown that consists of five snakes.

Ao Guang is his Eastern Asian folklore appearance. He is also associated of the term Azure Dragon.

=== Undersea Palace ===
Sāgara's palace lays at the bottom of the ocean and is the setting of several Mahayana sutras. It is 84,000 yojanas in length and width with an array of decorations that are seven-fold, including walls, banisters, jeweled nets and seven rows of trees. The palace is adorned with the seven treasures and is filled with the song of innumerable birds.

== Literature ==
King Sāgara appears extensively throughout the Buddhist canon. His name often appears in enumerations of dragon kings that appear among Śākyamuni Buddha's audience. On other occasions, he is a central figure who participates in conversation with the Buddha and bodhisattvas and elucidates matters in the realm of the nāgas.

=== Lotus Sutra ===
Chapter 12 of the Lotus Sutra contains the well-known episode of Sāgara's daughter, known simply as nāgakanya ("nāga maiden"), whose transformation allows her to procure the male body of a bodhisattva, followed by becoming a fully enlightened Buddha.

This event was preceded by Mañjuśrī's visit to Sāgara's ocean palace, where he taught the Lotus Sutra to the nāgas.

=== Lalitavistara Sūtra ===
Sāgara makes a few appearances in the Lalitavistara Sūtra. He is one among six nāga kings who make the aspiration to venerate the bodhisattva Siddhārtha with clouds and rain of sandalwood powder.

When Siddhārtha discarded the golden bowl provided by Sujātā, Sāgara took it from the bottom of the Nairañjanā River and later gave it to Śakra to be enshrined among the gods in Trāyastriṃśa.

Towards the end of the story, the Buddha is described as having a rumbling voice like that of one of Sāgara's thunderclouds.

=== Sutra on the Questions of the Nāga King Sāgara ===
Three extant versions of this sutra exist in both the Tibetan Kangyur and the Taishō Tripiṭaka (T0598, T0599 and T0601). Known in Sanskrit as the Sāgaranāgarājaparipṛcchā Sūtra, all three texts are vastly different from each other regarding their content.

The shortest text opens with the Buddha residing in Sāgara's ocean palace accompanied by an audience of 1,250 monks. The Buddha addresses Sāgara and teaches him that speaking the Four Dharma Seals is synonymous with speaking the 84,000 methods of teaching the Dharma.

=== As Ao Guang ===
In the cosmological Dragon Kings of the Four Seas and cardinal directions, Ao Guang is the Eastern Sea Dragon King or also known as the Azure dragon of the east.

In the East Asian Folk cultures, Ao Guang appears in various work of arts and literature. In One of the folk tales, the Four Dragon Kings were punished by the Jade Emperor for defying the Heavenly court and bringing rain on Earth without permission during the times of drought.

In the Complete Tale of Avalokiteśvara and the Southern Seas, his third son was accidentally captured by the fisherman and he pleads Avalokiteśvara for help. Avalokiteśvara saves the third dragon prince and also takes Ao Guang's daughter, Longnü/Naga Kanya as his disciple.

In the myth of The Eight Immortals Cross the Sea, Ao Guang's eldest two sons were killed by the immortals.

In Fengshen Yanyi, Ao Guang's third son, Ao Bing meets a tragic end with his friend Nezha. In grief, Ao Guang pleads for justice from the heavens; as a result, Nezha willingly commits suicide after realizing his mistake.

In Journey to the West, the Great Sage Monkey King causes a grave disturbance in the underwater palace; through the circumstances, Ao Guang is forced to show Sun Wukong the treasure of the Four Seas, from where Sun Wukong took the Ruyi Jingu Bang and a set of royal attire—including a phoenix-feather cap, golden chain mail, and cloud-walking boots.

== See also ==
- Nagaraja
- Longnü
- Dragon King
- Ao Guang
- Azure Dragon
- Ao Bing
- Ao Run
