= List of media adaptations of the Investiture of the Gods =

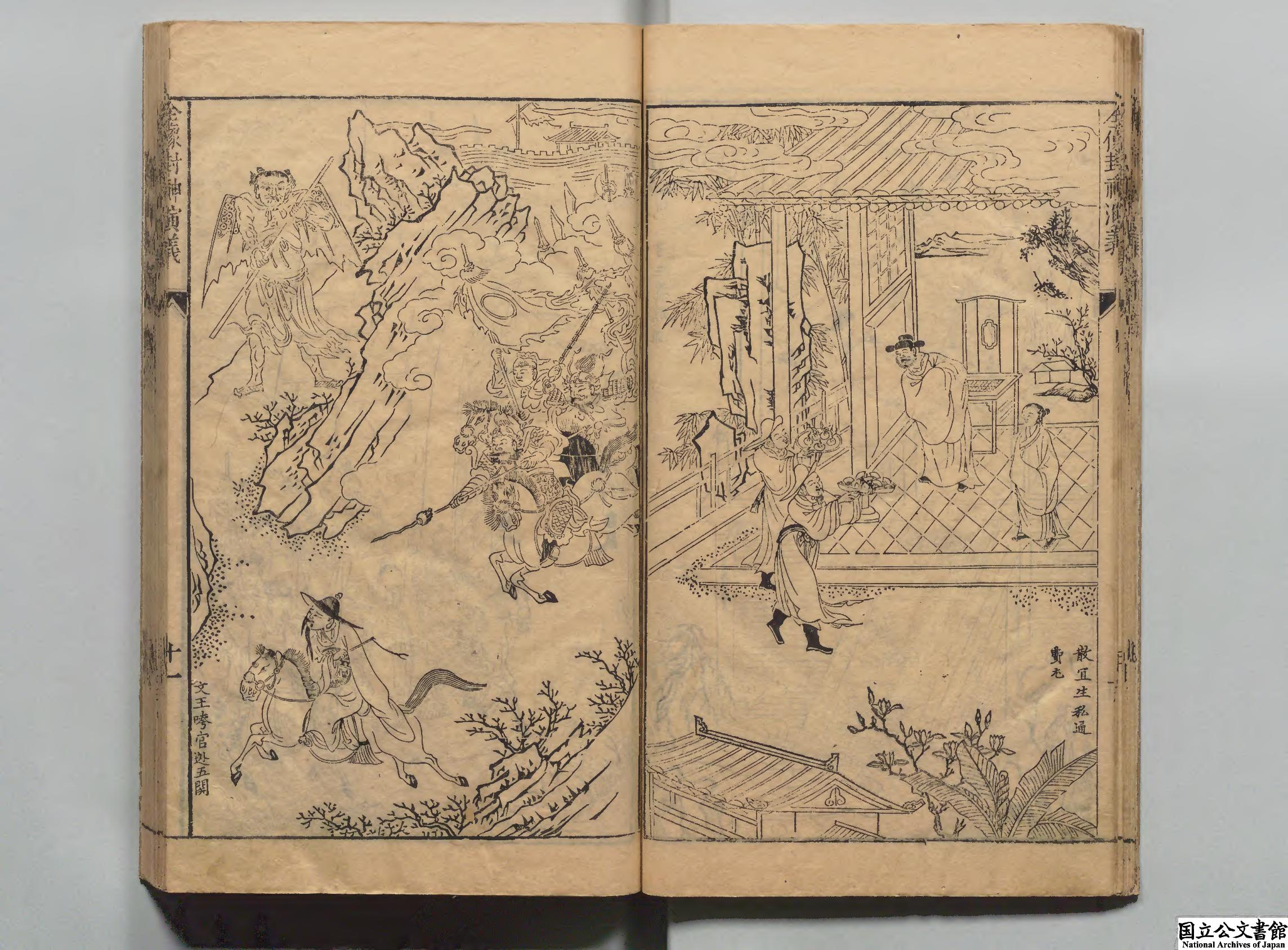
Illustrations of Fengshen Yanyi from an edition of the novel featuring commentary by Zhong Xing (1574-1625) (book one)

The Investiture of the Gods, also known as Fengshen Yanyi (Chinese: 封神演義; pinyin: Fēngshén Yǎnyì), is a 16th-century Chinese novel and one of the major vernacular Chinese works in the gods and demons (shenmo) genre written during the Ming dynasty (1368–1644). The novel is considered to be one of China's great vernacular fictions and has had a significant influence on Chinese and Japanese popular culture. In Chinese folk religion, several characters from the novel are revered and worshiped as deities. These characters hold a significant place in the religious beliefs and practices of Chinese culture. Their stories and attributes have captivated the imaginations of believers, leading to their deification. The worship of these characters from Fengshen Yanyi serves as a testament to the deep connection between literature, mythology, and Chinese folk religion. The novel has become a national myth for the Chinese people. It has been adapted in various forms, including television series, manhua, manga, and video games.

== Translations ==
=== English ===
- Xu Zhonglin (1992) [1550s]. Creation of the Gods. Translated by Gu Zhizhong. Beijing: New World Press. ISBN 780005134X. - stripped of all the poetry and the quality is very poor but it is the only almost complete translation that is currently available
- Xu Zhonglin (2002) [1550s]. Tales of the Teahouse Retold: Investiture of the Gods. Translated by Katherine Liang Chew. Lincoln, NE: Writers Club Press. ISBN 9780595254194. This is a partial translation containing only the first 46 chapters out of 100.

==== Retellings ====
- The Last King of Shang by Jeff Pepper - a translated retelling in contemporary English published by Imagin8 Press
- John Zhu - available online at Chinese Lore (Investiture of the Gods Podcast)

=== Dutch ===
- The book was also translated to Dutch as Feng Shen: De Verheffing tot Goden by Nio Joe Lan (Jakarta, 1940).

== Films ==
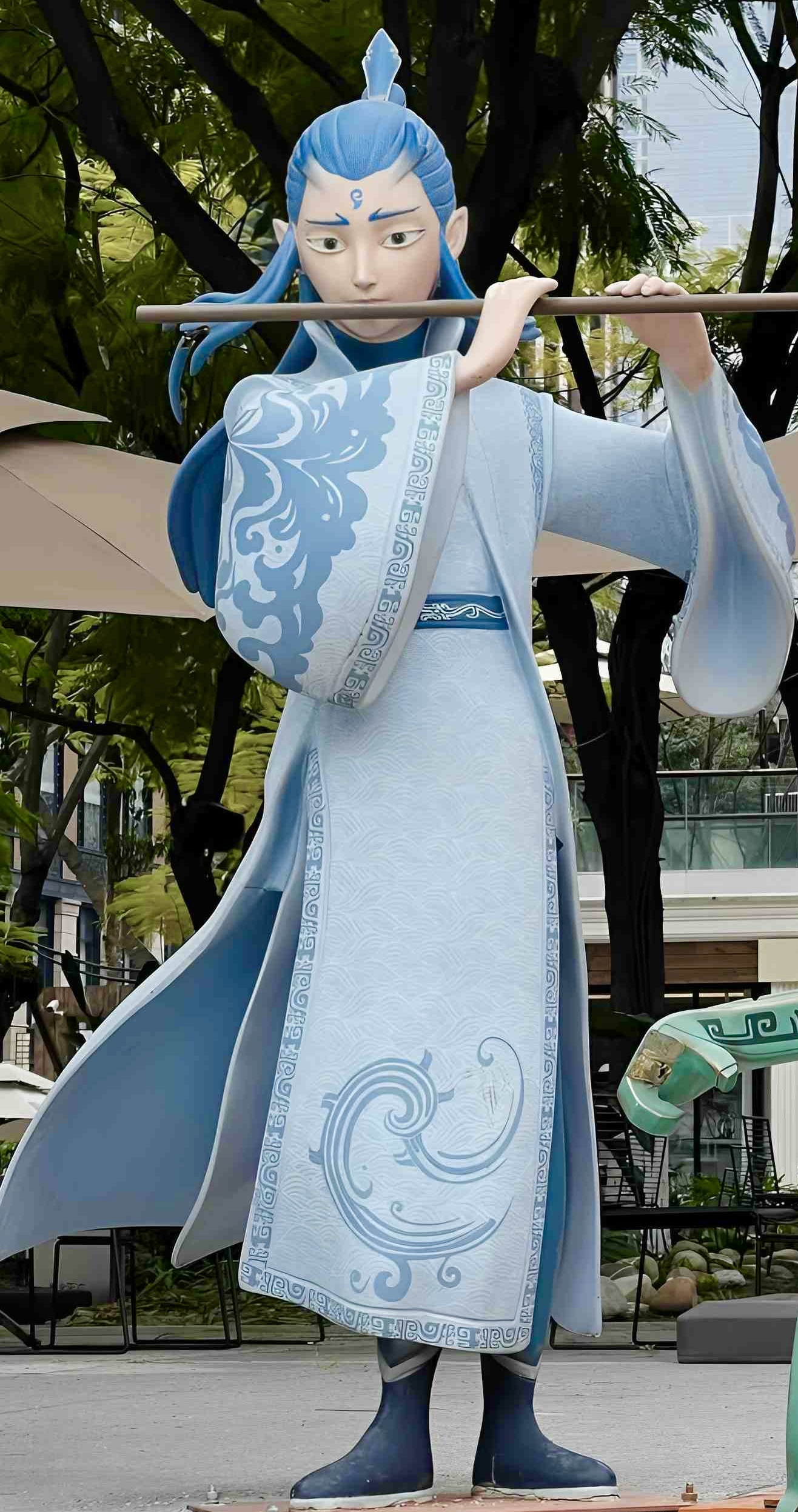
Sculpture of Ao Bing as depicted in Ne Zha, located in the Chengdu Hi-tech Zone.

- The Story of Chinese Gods, a 1975 hand-drawn animated film.
- Nezha Conquers the Dragon King, a 1979 Chinese animated fantasy film.
- The Legend of Ne Zha, a 1999 Chinese film.
- League of Gods, a 2016 3D Chinese movie produced by China Star Entertainment Group.
- Nezha Conquers The Dragon King, a 2019 Chinese film.
- Ne Zha, a 2019 Chinese 3D animation film.
  - Jiang Ziya, a 2020 Chinese 3D animation film.
  - Ne Zha 2, a 2025 sequel to the 2019 film.
- New Gods: Nezha Reborn, a 2021 Chinese 3D animation film.
- New Gods: Yang Jian, a 2022 Chinese 3D animation film.
- The Creation of the Gods trilogy:
  - Creation of the Gods I: Kingdom of Storms, a 2023 Chinese film.
  - Creation of the Gods II: Demon Force, a 2025 Chinese film.
  - Creation of the Gods III: Creation Under Heaven, an upcoming Chinese film.

== Television ==
- God's Parade, a 1981 TVB TV series which has a song performed by Adam Cheng.
- Gods of Honour, a 2001 Hong Kong television series produced by TVB as attributed to God's Parade.
- The Legend Of Nezha, a 2003 Chinese animated fantasy series.
- The Legend and the Hero, a 2007 Chinese television series. It was followed by a 2009 sequel, The Legend and the Hero 2.
- Ghost Catcher: Legend of Beauty, a 2010 Chinese television series.
- The Investiture of the Gods, a 2014 Chinese live action series produced by Shandong Television and starring Sammul Chan and Viann Zhang.
- Investiture of the Gods, a 2019 Chinese live action series produced by Mango Studio and starring Wang Likun, Luo Jin, Zhang Bo, Yu Hewei, Deng Lun, and Collin Chou.
- Zhaoge, an upcoming Chinese television series.

== Others ==
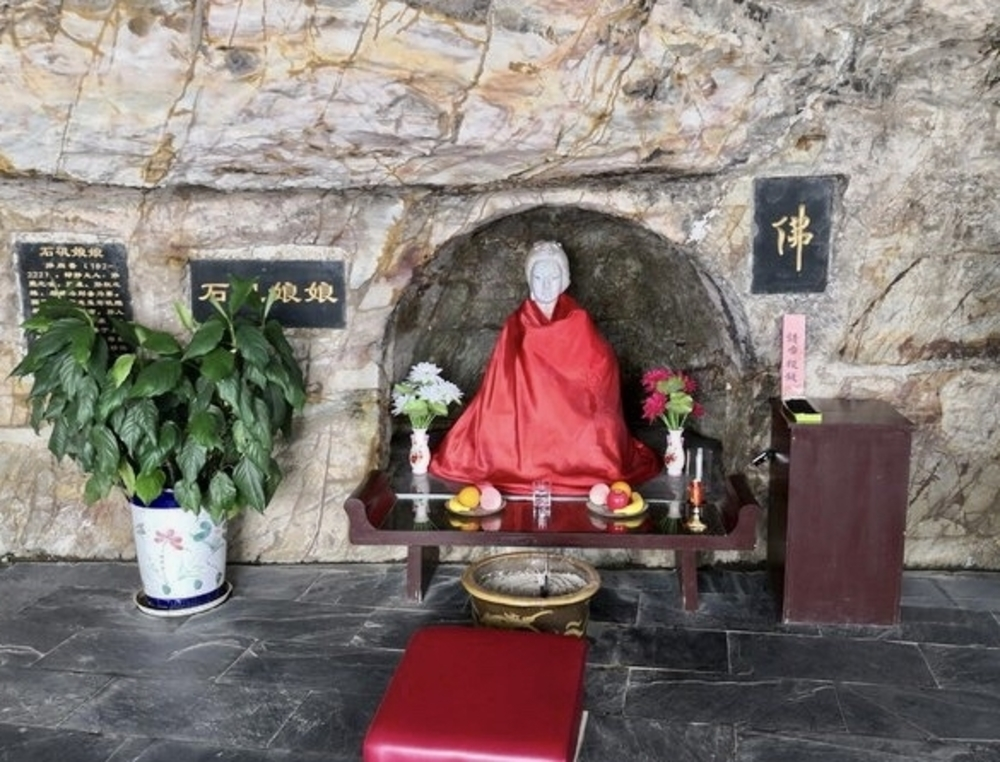
Statue of Shiji Niangniang, a major antagonist of Nezha

- Notable characters from Fengshen Yanyi are enshrined as reliefs in the Tua Pek Kong Temple, Sibu, Malaysia.
- The Founding of the Zhou Dynasty, the first story arc of the Hong Kong manhua series Legend of Emperors by Wong Yuk-long.
- Unabridged 1970 Pingshu radio program by Yuan Kuocheng, consisting of the entire Fēngshén Yǎnyì in 200 episodes.
- Hoshin Engi, a Japanese manga series by Ryu Fujisaki based on the translation by Tsutomu Ano of the novel.
- Mystic Heroes (バトル封神, Batoru Hōshin), a 2002 video game by Koei loosely based on the book.
- Warriors Orochi, a video game series produced by Koei. It features three characters from the novel – Daji (called Da Ji in the game), Nezha, and Jiang Ziya (called Taigong Wang in the game) – as playable characters.
- Chronicles of the God's Order, an ongoing Hong Kong manhua.
