= Li Gen =

Li Gen may refer to:

- Li Gen (basketball) (born 1988), Chinese professional basketball player
- Li Gen (Investiture of the Gods), yaksha in Chinese novel Investiture of the Gods
- Li Gen (Qing dynasty) (Chinese: 李根; pinyin: lǐ gēn), Chinese calligrapher in Qing dynasty
- Li Gen (Tang dynasty) (simplified Chinese: 李亘; traditional Chinese: 李亙; pinyin: lǐ gèn), Chinese high-level official in Tang dynasty
- Li Gen (footballer) (born 1995), Chinese professional football player
