= Nezha Conquers the Dragon King =

1979 Chinese animated film

- Film poster

Chinese name
- Simplified Chinese: 哪吒闹海
- Traditional Chinese: 哪吒鬧海
- Literal meaning: Nezha churns the sea
Transcriptions
Standard Mandarin
- Hanyu Pinyin: Nézhā nào hǎi
Yue: Cantonese
- Jyutping: Naa^{4}zaa^{1} naau^{6} hoi^{2}
- Directed by: Wang Shuchen; Yan Dingxian; Xu Jingda
- Screenplay by: Wang Wang
- Based on: Investiture of the Gods
- Produced by: Liu Guimei
- Cinematography: Duan Xiaoxuan
- Edited by: Li Kaiji
- Music by: Jin Fuzai
- Production company: Shanghai Animation Film Studio
- Release date: 19 May 1979
- Running time: 65 minutes
- Country: China
- Language: Chinese

Nezha Conquers the Dragon King (simplified Chinese: 哪吒闹海; traditional Chinese: 哪吒鬧海; pinyin: Nézhā nào hǎi; lit. 'Nezha churns the sea') is a 1979 Chinese animated fantasy film produced by Shanghai Animation Film Studio. It was screened out of competition at the 1980 Cannes Film Festival, listed under the English title Prince Nezha's Triumph Against Dragon King, and it was released dubbed into English in the United Kingdom as Little Nezha Fights Great Dragon Kings.

== Plot ==
The film is an adaptation of a story in Chinese mythology (in particular, the epic fantasy novel Investiture of the Gods) about the warrior deity Nezha. After a gestation period of three and a half years, Lady Yin, the wife of General Li Jing, gives birth to a flesh ball, which becomes a lotus flower, from which Nezha is born. Nezha is born able to walk and talk, and is taken on as a student of the immortal Taiyi Zhenren.

The Dragon Kings of the Four Seas, tired of being peaceful, have become cruel and destructive, plaguing China with destructive storms and a drought. The people beg for rain, but the East Sea Dragon King Ao Guang ignores them, telling the yaksha Ye Sha to go and find children for him to eat. Ye Sha captures one of Nezha's friends as he is bathing by the ocean, and Nezha confronts him, injuring him badly. Ao Guang sends his third son, Ao Bing, next. Ao Bing is killed by Nezha, infuriating Ao Guang.

A variety of confrontations ensue between Nezha and Ao Guang. Ao Guang and the other Dragon Kings wreak havoc on the people, causing storms, floods and all manners of natural disasters. Seeing this, Nezha takes his father's sword, tells his parents that he is returning their flesh and bones to them, and calls out for his master before killing himself by slitting his throat.

He is reborn with the help of his master, again from a lotus blossom, and is given new weapons and abilities. After breaking into Ao Guang's underwater palace, he confronts Ao Guang and the other Dragon Kings again, and is finally triumphant.

== Release ==
In the United Kingdom, the film was broadcast on BBC Two in England in the early evening on 23 December 1984, in an English-language version, directed by Louis Elman and produced for the BBC by Leah International, which retitled the film Little Nezha Fights Great Dragon Kings (rendered in the Radio Times listing as Little Nezha Fights Great Dragon King, in the singular). The voice of Nezha was provided by actress and voice artist Rosemary Miller. As well as replacing the dialogue, it also replaced Jin Fuzai's score performed by the Shanghai Philharmonic Orchestra with one by Ivor Slaney. This version was released on video by BBC Enterprises in 1986 and rebroadcast earlier in the day for a few times during 1988.

The film was released on DVD with the original Chinese audio English subtitles in 2005, with Nezha Conquers the Dragon King as its English title.

The original-language version of the film was premiered in the UK and Ireland in its 2K digital restoration in an online Chinese Cinema Season which ran from 12 February to 12 May 2021.

== Awards ==
1980 Film Hundred Flowers Awards for Best Art Film

Ministry of Culture 1979 Outstanding Fine Arts Film

Special Award, Metro Manila Film Festival, Philippines,1983

== Impact ==
On 30 May 2014, the first Google Doodle (Google Doodle listing) featuring Nezha was displayed on Google's Hong Kong and Taiwan homepages: the 35th anniversary of the release of Nezha Conquers the Dragon King, with the word "Google" wrapped around Nezha's silk and an animated image of Nezha wielding a fire-tipped gun on the sea.

In August 2021, "Animation -Nezha Conquers the Dragon King" special stamps were issued in a set of 6 stamps with a face value of RMB 6.40, and 6.9 million sets are planned to be issued.

== Japanese version cast ==
- Banjō Ginga as Li Gen
- Daisuke Gōri as Li Jing – Nezha's father
- Junko Hori as Little boy 1
- Ichirō Nagai as Master Taiyi / Li Jing's chancellor
- Masako Nozawa as Nezha
- Nachi Nozawa as Ao Guang's chancellor
- Mari Okamoto as Little girl
- Chikao Ōtsuka as Dragon King
- Tomiko Suzuki as Little boy 2
- Norio Wakamoto as Ao Bing

== Other appearances ==
Nezha as a Google Doodle on Google Hong Kong and Google Taiwan

On 30 May 2014, Nezha Conquers the Dragon King was featured on Google Search's homepage as an animated doodle.

== See also ==
- Nezha
- List of animated feature films of 1979
