= Nangong Shi =

Nangong Shi may refer to:

- Nangong City, city in Xingtai, Hebei, China
- Nangong Kuo (disambiguation) (南宫适), often mispronounced as Nangong Shi.
