= Lu Xiong =

Fictional character from Investiture of the Gods

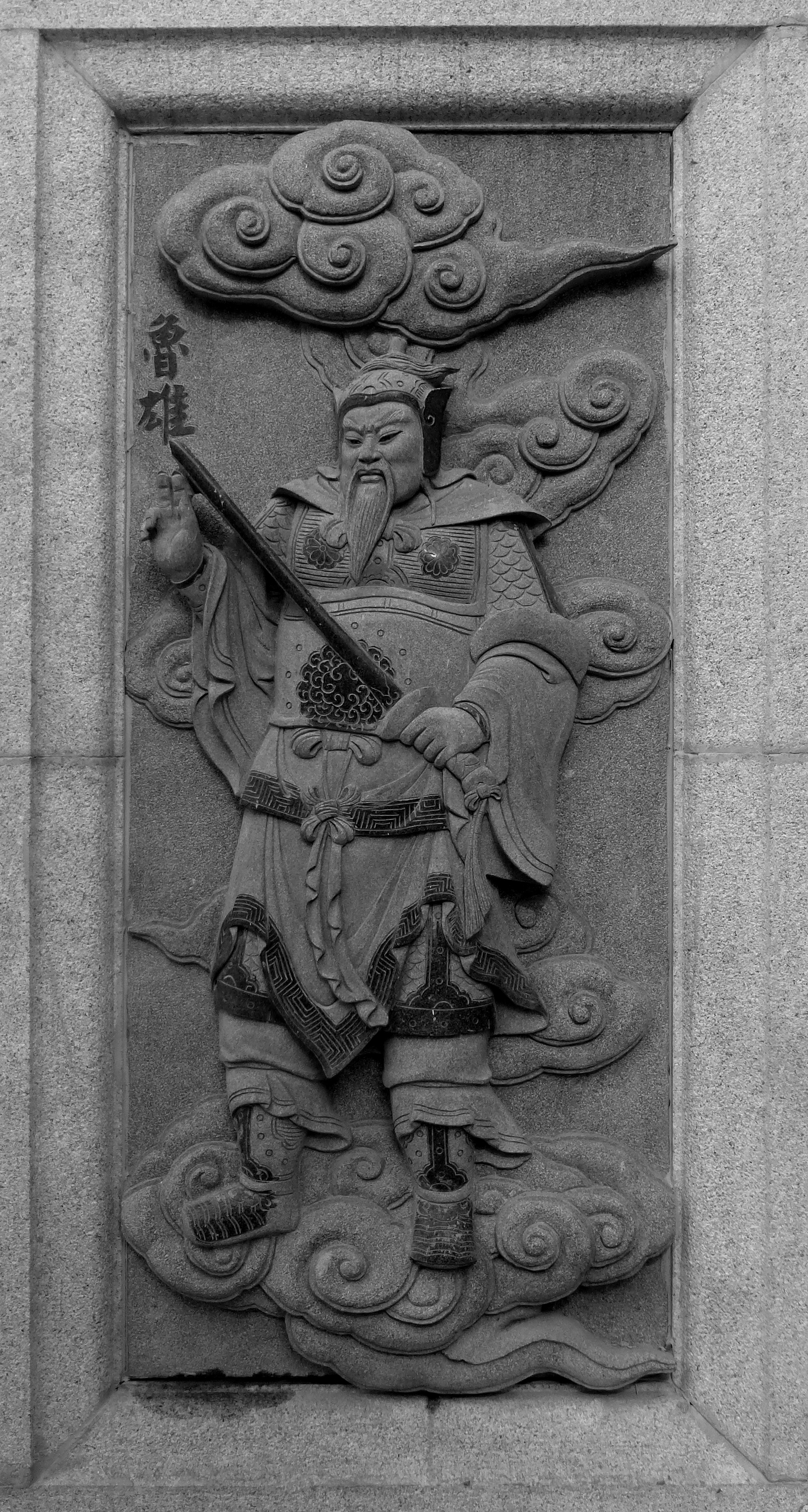
Relief of Lu Xiong at Ping Sien Si Temple.

Lu Xiong (simplified Chinese: 鲁雄; traditional Chinese: 魯雄; pinyin: Lǔ Xióng) is a fictional character in the Chinese Ming dynasty novel Investiture of the Gods (Fengshen Yanyi). He is a general of the Shang dynasty.

== Role in the novel ==
Lu Xiong serves as a military official at the Shang court. When Su Hu rebels against King Zhou (Di Xin), Lu Xiong advises the king during the discussion of the campaign against Su Hu. He proposes that Ji Chang, the Marquis of the West, accompany Chong Houhu and receive the Imperial Battle Axe. Lu Xiong later becomes involved in the Shang campaign against Xiqi. After the defeat of Zhang Guifang, Grand Preceptor Wen Zhong appoints Lu Xiong to lead an army of 50,000 soldiers. He is identified as the Left Army General (左军上将军).

Wen Zhong initially questions whether Lu Xiong's age will affect his ability to command the army. Lu Xiong responds by discussing military strategy and the qualities required of a commander. He says that a commander should consider the weather, terrain, and human factors when planning a campaign. He also asks for one or two military advisers to accompany him. Wen Zhong appoints Fei Zhong and You Hun as Lu Xiong's military advisers. Both men object that they are civilian officials and have no experience in military affairs, but Wen Zhong orders them to accompany Lu Xiong.

Before Lu Xiong reaches Xiqi, he learns that Zhang Guifang has been defeated and killed. Zhang's head is displayed at the eastern gate of Xiqi. Lu Xiong orders his army to camp near Xiqi Mountain and sends an urgent report to Wen Zhong. Jiang Ziya prepares an altar at Mount Qishan and causes heavy snowfall. The Shang soldiers, who are wearing summer clothing, are unable to withstand the cold. The snow and ice cause heavy casualties among the army, while Lu Xiong, Fei Zhong, and You Hun are captured by the Zhou forces.

After his capture, Jiang Ziya asks Lu Xiong why he continues to serve King Zhou when much of the realm has turned against him. Lu Xiong replies that he has received his ruler's support and should therefore share his ruler's fate. He refuses to surrender and is held in the Zhou camp. Lu Xiong, Fei Zhong, and You Hun are subsequently executed by the Zhou forces.

At the conclusion of the novel, Jiang Ziya reads the Heavenly Roster and assigns divine titles to those who died during the conflict between the Shang and Zhou. Lu Xiong is named as the Shuide Star (Chinese: 水德星; lit. 'Water Virtue Star'). The roster describes him as leading four deities of the Water Department: Jishui Leopard (箕水豹), Bishui Tapir (壁水貐), Shenshui Ape (参水猿), and Zhenshui Earthworm (轸水蚓).

== The Shuide Star ==
Shuide Xingjun (水德星君) is a Daoist star god linked to Mercury, known in Chinese as Chenxing (辰星), and the Water element. He is one of the Eleven Luminaries (十一曜), a group of celestial gods that includes the Sun, Moon, and five planets.

Shuide Xingjun also appears in Journey to the West. In Chapter 51, Sun Wukong asks him for help against the Azure Bull Demon King. Shuide Xingjun sends the Yellow River Water Earl (黄河水伯) to help him.
