= I Am Nezha =

- Poster
- Chinese: 我是哪吒
- Directed by: Shu Zhan
- Production companies: Suzhou Zhijie Multimedia; Suzhou Zhituo Animation; Beijing Hongyuan Tiancheng Investment; Jiangsu Tongtian Wenhua Cultural Creative Design Development; Beijing Qingshang Huamei Culture Creation
- Distributed by: Xingle Weiye (Beijing) Media; Sanyue Guyu (Beijing) Media; Pearl River Pictures; YL Pictures; Shanghai Leji Media
- Release date: 1 October 2016
- Running time: 83 minutes
- Country: China
- Language: Mandarin
- Box office: CN¥9.7 million

I Am Nezha (我是哪吒) is a 2016 Chinese animated film directed by Shu Zhan. It was released in China on 1 October 2016. The plot is based on Chinese legends.

== Plot ==
The 2016 Chinese 3D animated film "I Am Nezha" (我是哪吒) adapts the traditional Chinese legend of the rebellious boy-god into a classic coming-of-age fantasy adventure. After his unusual birth, the young and mischievous Nezha is deeply misunderstood, despised, and ostracized by the local villagers due to his chaotic antics and immense power. However, when a malicious conspiracy embroils him in a severe conflict with the formidable Dragon Clan, Nezha must look past the townspeople's rejection and harness his supernatural abilities to stand as their defender. Ultimately, he engages in an epic, high-stakes battle against the aquatic dragon forces to protect his home, transforming from a feared outcast into a selfless, revered hero.

== Cast ==
- Tao Dian
- Han Jiaojiao
- Liu Yao
- Peng Bo
- Zou Liang
- Liang Dawei
- Yao Yanze
- Meng Xianglong
- Wang Bochao
- Hu Yi
- Wu Yifei
- Zhang Huanzhao

== Reception ==
The film grossed CN¥9.7 million at the Chinese box office.

== See also ==
- Nezha
