= Ao Guang =

Deity in Chinese folk religion

- Chinese: 敖光
Transcriptions
Standard Mandarin
- Hanyu Pinyin: Áo Guāng
Yue: Cantonese
- Jyutping: ngou4 gwong1

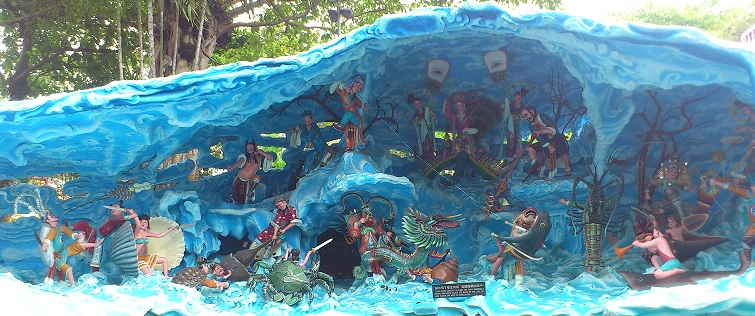
Diorama at Haw Par Villa, Singapore, depicting the battle between the Eight Immortals and the forces of Ao Guang.

Ao Guang (Chinese: 敖光; pinyin: Áo Guāng; or traditional Chinese: 敖廣; simplified Chinese: 敖广; pinyin: Áo Guǎng (Note: His name is written as 敖光 in the Fengshen Yanyi, and 敖廣 in the Journey to the West.)) is the Dragon King of the East Sea in Chinese folklore. He is a famous figure in Asian mythology, folk-lore and folk-religion combined. He featured prominently in different classical works including Fengshen Yanyi and Journey to the West.

== Origins ==
In Buddhism, the Dragon King sea sutra reveals, there were eight dragon kings. Ao Guang is referred as the Dragon King Sagara. The Avataṃsaka Sūtra reveals that he is the nāgaraja that presides over the world's supply of rain.

Ao Guang is associated as the term of Azure Dragon (靑龍; Qīnglóng), or Green Dragon (蒼龍; Cānglóng), who is one of the Dragon Gods. It is also one of the Four Symbols of the Chinese constellations.

== Legends ==
The Four Dragon Kings were punished by the Jade Emperor for defying the Heavenly court and bringing rain on Earth without permission during the times of drought.

In the Complete Tale of Avalokiteśvara and the Southern Seas, his third son was accidentally captured by the fisherman and he pleads Avalokiteśvara(Guanyin) for help. Avalokiteśvara saves the third dragon prince and also takes Ao Guang's daughter, Longnü (Naga Kanya) as his disciple.

=== Fengshen Yanyi ===
According to Fengshen Yanyi, after the passage of many years, Ao Guang had brought chaos to the world by creating droughts, storms, and other disasters. Due to the people's immense fear of the dragon king and his sons, they never dared seek protection against him from the Jade Emperor. As a result, Ao Guang enjoyed countless offerings by the people throughout a time interval of many years. One day, Nezha cleansed himself at a neighboring stream of the East Sea, causing Ao Guang's palace to shake at an annoying level. After Ao Guang's favorite investigator Li Gen and third son Ao Bing were both killed by Nezha, Ao Guang set out to talk to Nezha's father, Li Jing. Ao Guang demanded that Li Jing offer himself as a sacrifice to atone for Nezha's actions, but Li Jing refused. After a long discussion on the matter, Ao Guang, by now extremely angry, ascended to the heavens to state the issue to the Jade Emperor. However, Nezha, having opted to sacrifice himself in his father's place, appeared in heaven and began to beat Ao Guang very violently, even tearing scales from his skin and causing him to bleed. Ao Guang was forced to turn himself into a small snake and come with Nezha back to the Old Pond Pass to forget about the incident completely.

Later, Ao Guang, along with three other dragon kings, came to Old Pond Pass and took both Li Jing and his wife Lady Yin. Nezha, wishing to free them, offers the dragons all of his internal organs in exchange for his parents. Ao Guang personally agreed to Nezha's resolution with happiness and brought his internal organs to the Jade Emperor. After this point, Ao Guang's fate is unknown.

=== Journey to the West ===
In Journey to the West, the monkey king Sun Wukong obtained his Ruyi Jingu Bang, a magically expanding, gold-ringed iron rod weapon, from Ao Guang. This weapon was originally a tool for measuring the depth of sea water used by Yu the Great in his flood control and treatment efforts, hence its ability to vary its shape and length. After Yu left, it remained in the sea and became the "pillar holding down the sea", an unmovable treasure of the undersea palace of Ao Guang.

One of Wukong's senior advisors had told him to seek out the dragon-king in order to get a powerful weapon befitting his skill. In the dragon palace, he tried out several kinds of heavenly weapons, many of which bent or completely broke as he wielded them. Ao Guang's wife then suggested the Ruyi Jingu Bang, stating that some time prior the iron rod had begun to emit a strange heavenly light and that she believed the Monkey King was destined to obtain it. When Wukong neared the pillar, it began to glow, signifying that the Monkey King was its true owner. It obediently listened to his commands and shrank to a manageable size so Wukong could wield it effectively. This awed the dragons and threw the sea into confusion, the Monkey King having removed the only thing controlling the ebb and flow of the ocean's tides. In addition to the magic staff, Wukong also forced Ao Guang to give him other magical gifts, including golden chain mail, a phoenix-feather cap, and cloud-walking boots.

Wukong solicits Ao Guang's aid later in the journey to overcome Red Boy, a demon who had captured Tang Sanzang. Ao Guang provides torrential rain in an attempt to stop Red Boy's fire, but the fire cannot be stopped by ordinary water. Ao Guang returns to the East Ocean unable to help Wukong defeat Red Boy. In a later adventure, Ao Guang again shows deference to Wukong and assists Wukong in a rain-making contest and creating an elixir.

=== The Eight Immortals Crossing the Sea ===
In the tale of The Eight Immortals Crossing the Sea, the Queen Mother of the West extends an invitation to the Eight Immortals to attend the Conference of the Magical Peach (蟠桃會; pán taó huì). As they cross the ocean, they encounter a confrontation with the Dragon King of the East Sea, which escalates into a fierce dispute between the two sides. Eventually, the Eight Immortals and their companions employ the power of their talismans, emerging victorious and successfully completing their journey across the sea.

== In popular culture ==
In the MOBA game SMITE, he is featured under the name Ao Kuang, Dragon King of the Eastern Seas as a melee mage.

In the animated film Prince Nezha's Triumph Against Dragon King, Ao Guang is featured alongside the Dragon Kings of the northern, southern, and western oceans in his feud with Nezha. During this retelling of the story, the other three Dragon Kings are subdued whilst Ao Guang is impaled and petrified on Nezha's spear.

In the second expansion pack of the video game Age of Mythology, Ao Guang is one of the three minor gods the player can worship in the Mythic Age. He grants the player the Azure Dragon and Dragon Turtle units, and the God Power of the great flood.

In the Disney+ series American Born Chinese, Ao Guang is portrayed by Jimmy O. Yang. This version is depicted as despising the materialism of the other Gods and Celestials and is overjoyed to hear Sun Wukong calling them all out for their self-congratulatory party.

In the Netflix animated film The Monkey King, Ao Guang, simply referred to as "The Dragon King", is portrayed as the main antagonist. He seeks to cover the entire world in water as revenge for his many years of torment, mainly through a skin condition when suffers from when out of water. Ao Guang is voiced by Bowen Yang.

== See also ==
- Azure Dragon, Ao Guang's manifestation in Chinese astrology
- Ao Run
