= Ji Shuqian =

Investiture of the Gods character

Ji Shuqian (Chinese: 姬叔乾; pinyin: Jī Shūqián) is a character featured within the famed classic Chinese novel Investiture of the Gods.

Ji Shuqian is a younger brother of King Wu. Unlike his other brothers, Ji Shuqian will overcome any conflict that may appear before him (for he has unparalleled confidence in his abilities.) Once Ji Shuqian had heard of the supposed magical abilities of Zhang Guifang and his vanguard, Feng Lin, Ji would head out of the front gates of Phoenix City to prove that no mere magic could best his prowess.

However, Feng solely stood before him. After barking at the foolish looking Feng, Ji would unleash his ultimate potential; effectively Ji would send Feng scurrying away with countless wounds. To the immense surprise of Ji, however, Feng immediately unleashed a fog of black smoke combined with a large ball of fire at Ji. After Ji toppled to the ground in shock, he would be clobbered to death by Feng.

Ji Shuqian was appointed as the deity of Tiangui Star (天贵星) in the end.
