= Nangong Kuo =

Nangong Kuo (南宮适), sometimes misread as Nangong Shi, may refer to:

- Nangong Kuo (Western Zhou), official of Western Zhou
- Nangong Kuo (disciple of Confucius)
