= Zhao Qi (Investiture of the Gods) =

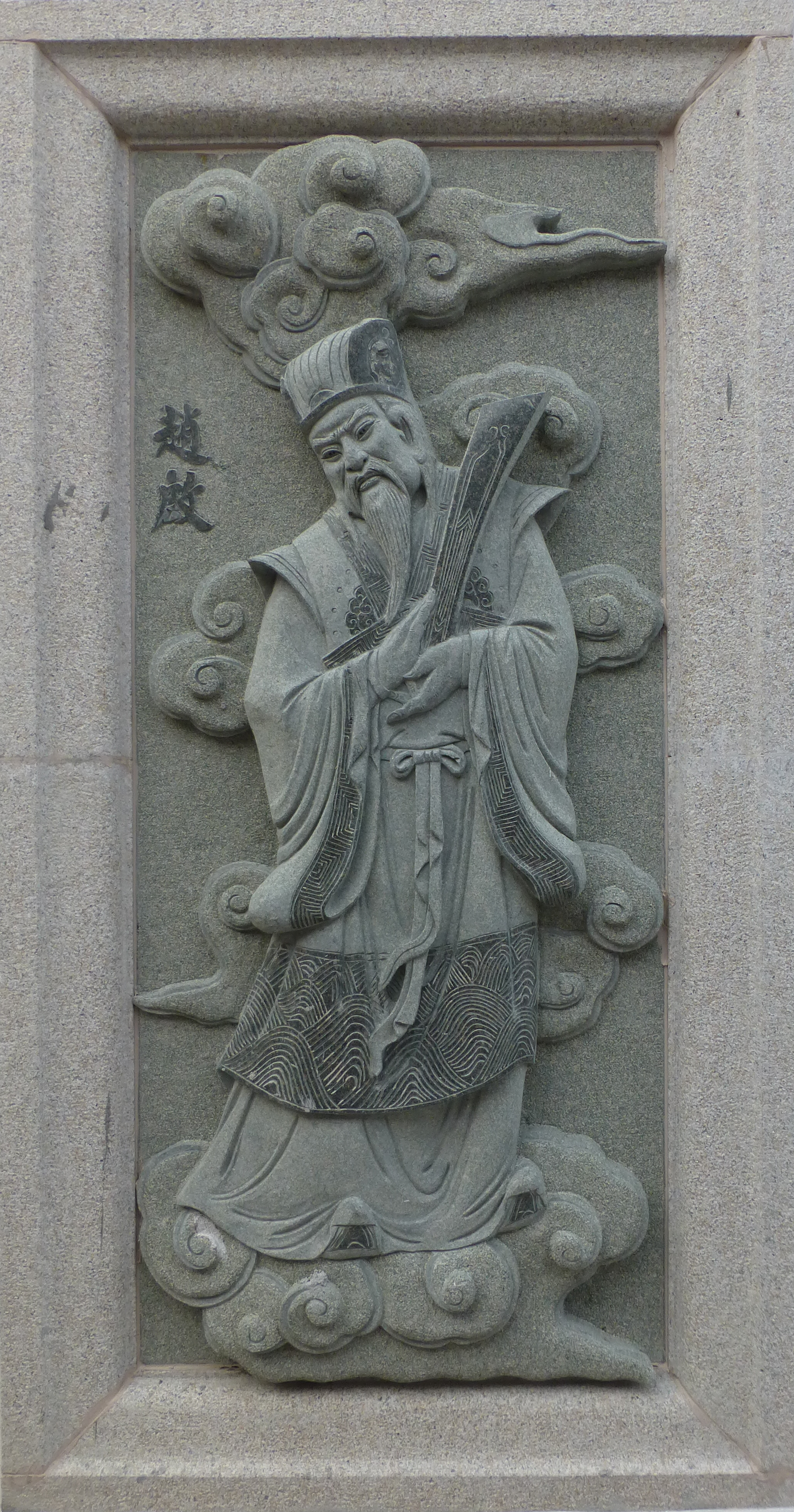
Zhao Qi at Ping Sien Si

Zhao Qi (simplified Chinese: 赵启; traditional Chinese: 趙啓; pinyin: Zhào Qǐ) is a fictional character in the Chinese novel Investiture of the Gods (Fengshen Yanyi). He is a senior official of the Shang dynasty who opposes King Zhou and is executed after openly criticizing the king. At the end of the novel, he is appointed as the Tianshe Star (天赦星).

== In Investiture of the Gods ==
Zhao Qi is introduced as an shang dafu (上大夫), a senior official of the Shang court. In the first chapter, he joins Shang Rong and Mei Bo in submitting a memorial to King Di Yi recommending Shou Wang, the future King Zhou, as crown prince.

Later, King Zhou orders the execution of his sons Yin Jiao and Yin Hong. When the two princes are brought to the execution ground, Zhao Qi takes the execution order and tears it apart. He then joins the other officials in seeking to remonstrate with the king.

After Shang Rong dies in the palace while protesting against King Zhou, Zhao Qi openly denounces the king. He accuses him of killing his wife and sons, executing loyal ministers, favoring Daji and her supporters, and bringing disorder to the Shang state. King Zhou orders Zhao Qi to be executed by the bronze-roasting punishment (炮烙). Zhao Qi accepts his death and declares that he is willing to die rather than abandon his loyalty.

At the end of the novel, Jiang Ziya assigns celestial titles to the deceased characters. Zhao Qi is appointed as the Tianshe Star (天赦星).
