= Ao Bing =

Fictional character

- Investiture of the Gods character
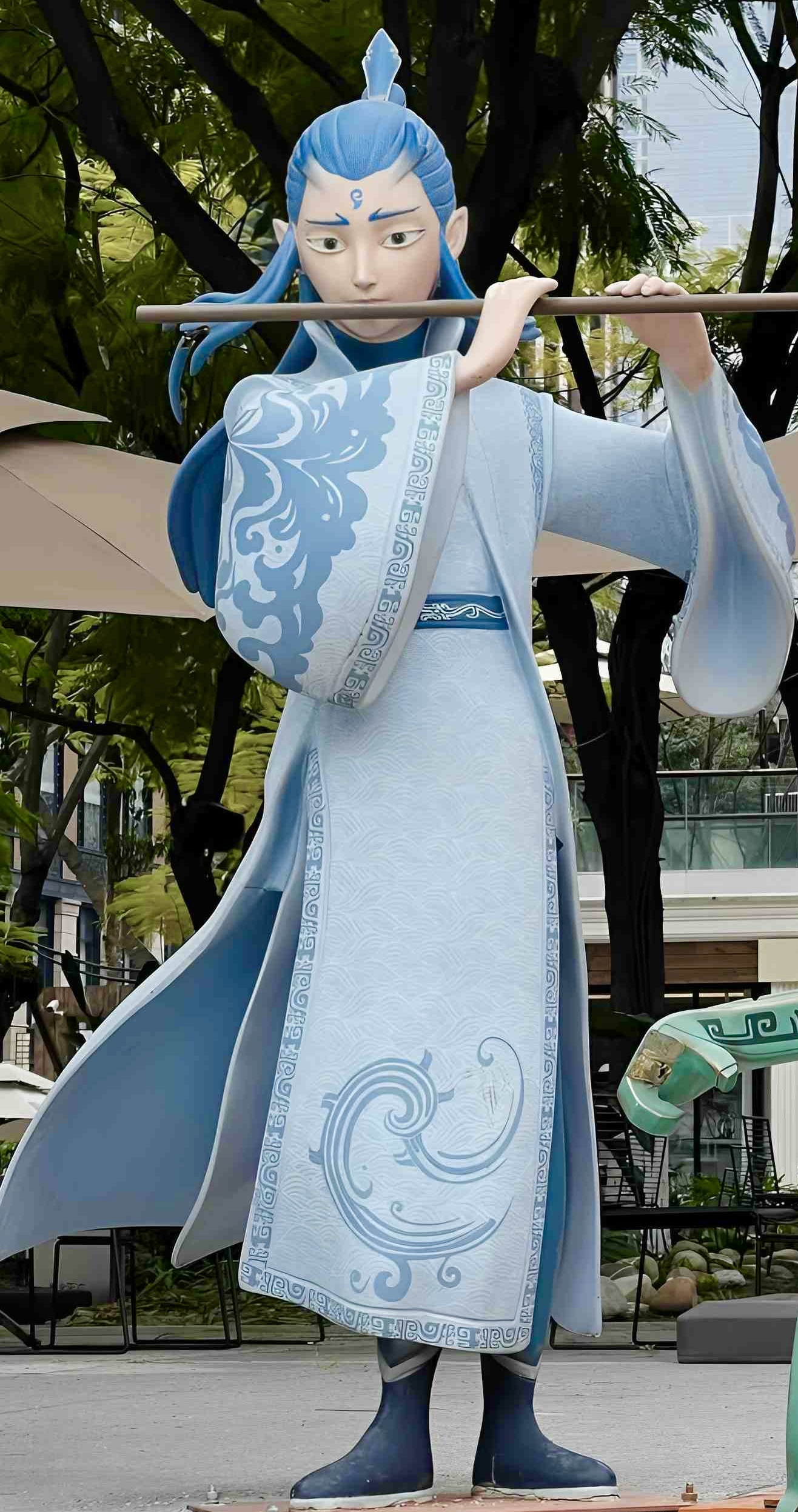
- A sculpture of Ao Bing as depicted in the animated film Ne Zha, located in the Chengdu Hi-tech Zone

In-universe information
- Alias: The Third Dragon Prince
- Species: Chinese dragon
- Gender: Male
- Family: Ao Guang (father); Unnamed Dragon Queen (mother); Ao Jia (elder brother); Ao Yi (elder brother); Ao Run (uncle); Yülong (cousin); Other members of the Ao clan (relatives)
- Religion: Taoism
- Home: East Sea

Ao Bing (Chinese: 敖丙; pinyin: Áo Bǐng) is a character in the classic Chinese novel Investiture of the Gods (Fengshen Yanyi). He is a dragon prince and the third son of Ao Guang, the Dragon King of the East Sea. Ao Bing is a major antagonist in the Nezha story. He is often shown as arrogant, spoiled, and cruel, abusing his power as a dragon prince. The narrative typically involves Ao Bing and his father demanding tributes of young children for their underwater palace.

The modern portrayal of Ao Bing as a compassionate friend to Nezha, even when he occasionally opposes him, especially in the hugely successful 2019 film Ne Zha and its sequel, represents a significant departure from his traditional depiction.

== In Fengshen Yanyi ==
The third son of Ao Guang, the Dragon King of the East Sea, Ao Bing lives in the Crystal Palace with his brothers, Ao Jia and Ao Yi. Both of them are older than him. Ao Bing was originally revered as a rain god who would bestow the rain at his command upon any individual in need, but, as time passed, his father became corrupt, and soon the people were living in fear of the stormy malevolence of Ao Guang and his three sons. After the divine child-hero Nezha had slain the yaksha Li Gen and been seen creating tremors that threatened to destroy the Crystal Palace of the Dragon King, Ao Bing set out (with his father's consent) to confront Nezha, riding upon a great green beast and accompanied by his father's troops.

When Ao Bing duly confronted Nezha, he was greeted with such impoliteness that he became enraged and yelled, "You self-righteous cur! The Jade Emperor of Heaven himself sent Li Gen to us, but you killed him without regret because you were insane and arrogant. You dog, defend yourself!" Instead of wasting any more words, the hero and dragon prince launched themselves into a fierce battle, with Nezha brandishing his magic scarf that could kill people and Ao Bing brandishing his powerful silver spear. After the exchange of many bitter blows, Nezha was finally able to overcome his adversary by unleashing a blazing fireball at him from his magic scarf and then trampling his head underfoot before he could recover from the blow. In his death agony, Ao Bing was forced to reveal his true (dragon) form, and he died burning inwardly with hatred for his youthful opponent.

After the Shang dynasty's defeat, when Jiang Ziya conferred god titles, he was appointed as the god of Huagai xing (華蓋星). He is one of the characters who have been sealed twice as a god in the Registry of Gods, followed by his subordinate, the yaksha Li Gen.

== Folklore ==
According to folklore, when Nezha caused havoc in the East Sea, he used the Universe Ring (Qiankun Quan) to kill the white dragon, Ao Bing. Later, the immortal Taiyi Zhenren revived Ao Bing using tendon-relaxing vines and white pine bark. After coming back to life, the Ao Bing retreated underground, built another palace, and continued cultivating until he attained enlightenment and ascended to the heavens. This miraculous cave was left behind, and people named the White Dragon’s cultivation palace "White Dragon Palace." White Dragon Palace is now a tourist destination that combines mountains, water, and caves into a scenic attraction. It is located in Hancheng, 18 kilometers west of Jiangyou. Its most distinctive features are its primitive, natural, and ancient charm. Stretching 1.2 kilometers in length, the cave is divided into both water and dry sections.

== Worship ==
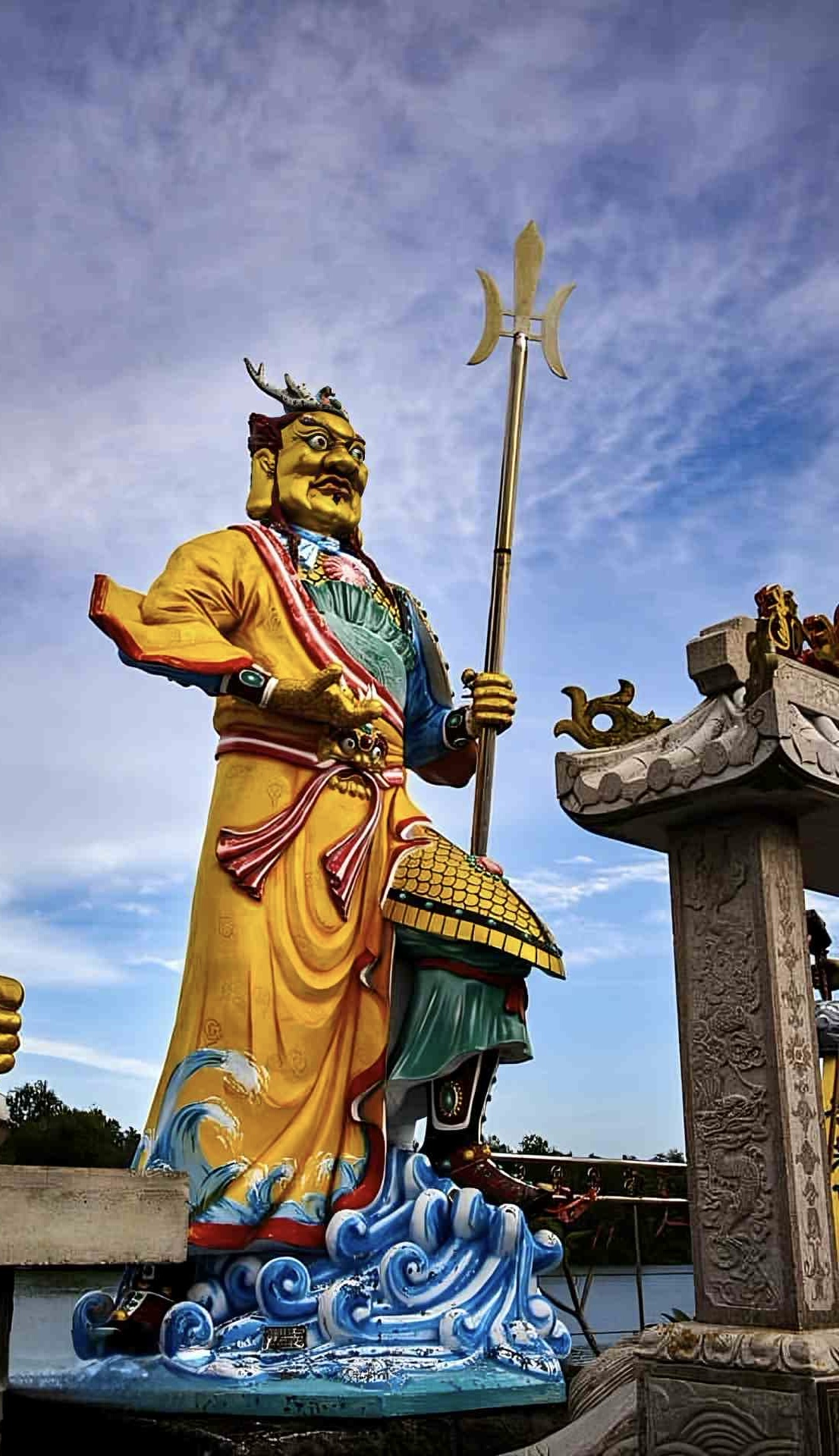
Statue of Ao Bing at the Sihai Longwang Temple in Batu Pahat

In Taoist traditions and folk beliefs, Ao Bing is worshiped as a folk deity and enshrined in some temples dedicated to the Dragon Kings of the Four Seas. The Sihai Longwang Temple in Batu Pahat enshrines a 12-foot-tall statue of Ao Bing.

== In popular culture ==
- Ao Bing appears as a major character in the animated films Ne Zha (2019) and Ne Zha 2 (2025), voiced by Han Mo in Chinese and Aleks Le in English. The films, loosely based on Investiture of the Gods, depict Ao Bing as friendlier than in prior depictions, and he becomes friends with the title character. Both films broke numerous box-office records upon their initial releases, with Ne Zha 2 in particular becoming the highest-grossing film of all time in China, the highest-grossing animated movie of all time, and the fifth highest-grossing movie of all time.
- In the 2022 mobile game Dislyte, the character "Long Mian" is chosen as Ao Bing's "avatar", blessed with his powers.
