= Fang Brothers =

Characters in Fengshen Yanyi

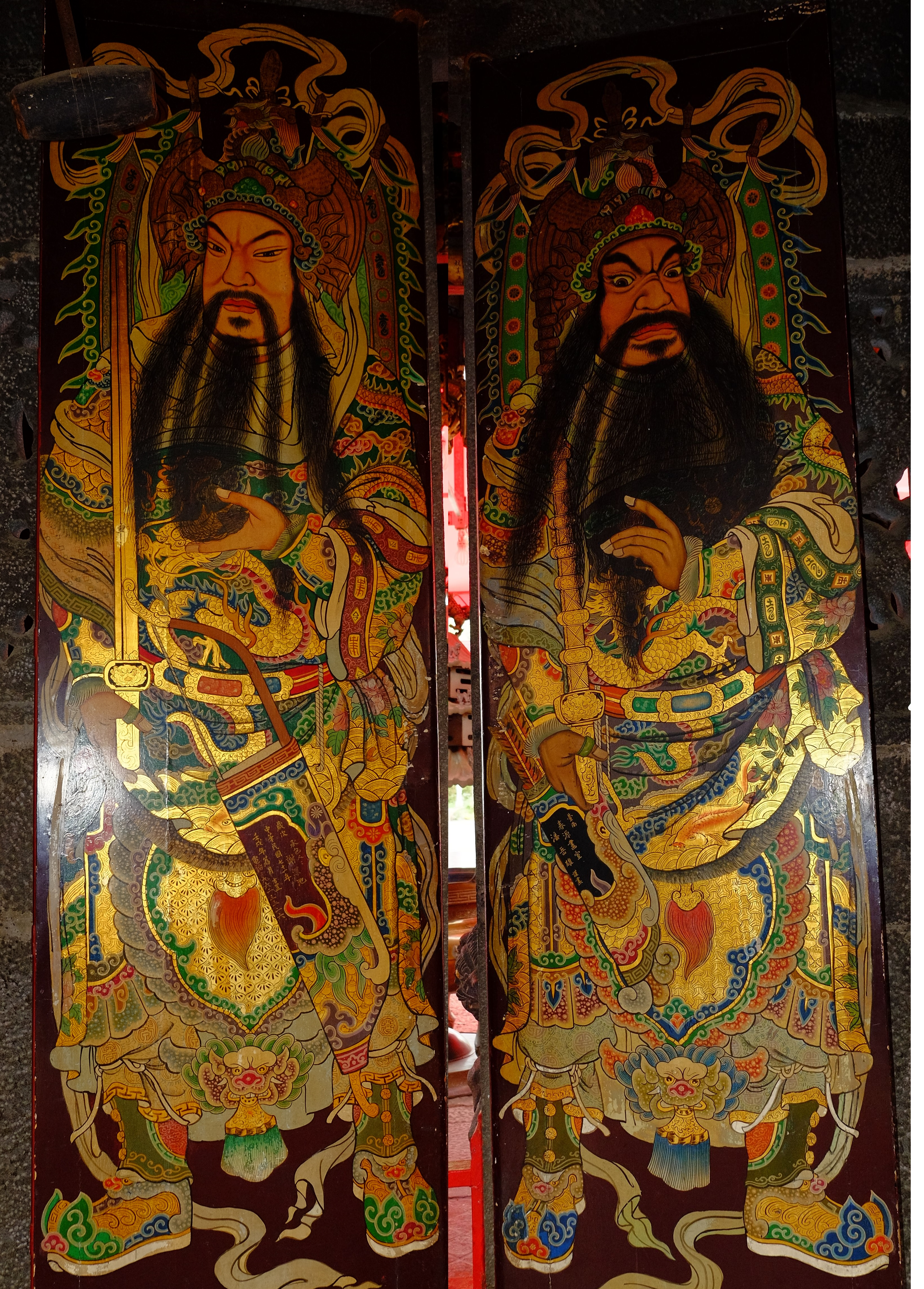
Menshen (door gods)

The Fang Brothers, Fang Bi (Chinese: 方弼; pinyin: Fāng Bì) and Fang Xiang (Chinese: 方相; pinyin: Fāng Xiàng), are two palace generals serving King Zhou of the Shang dynasty in the Chinese novel Investiture of the Gods (Fengshen Yanyi).

== In Fengshen Yanyi ==
Following the death of Queen Jiang, Fang Bi and Fang Xiang join other officials in discussing the situation at court. When King Zhou orders the deaths of his sons Yin Jiao and Yin Hong, the brothers turn against him. Fang Bi takes Yin Jiao and Fang Xiang takes Yin Hong, and they carry the two princes out of Chaoge while declaring their intention to seek military assistance in Donglu.

Huang Feihu catches up with them and tells them that King Zhou has ordered the princes' deaths. After discussing their options, Fang Bi and Fang Xiang separate from the princes, who continue toward Donglu and Nanlu. The brothers later make their way to the Zhou forces and join the campaign against Shang.

During the campaign, Fang Bi is sent to break the Wind-Roaring Formation (風吼陣), where he is killed. Fang Xiang is later sent to break the Soul-Destroying Formation (落魄陣), where he also dies.

After the establishment of the Zhou dynasty, Jiang Ziya receives the decree to confer divine titles on the dead. Fang Bi is appointed as the Xian Dao Shen (顯道神), while Fang Xiang is appointed as the Kai Lu Shen (開路神).

== Worship ==
Fang Bi and Fang Xiang are worshipped as door gods in parts of China. They appear in traditional woodblock New Year paintings from Fengxiang, Shaanxi. The paintings are placed on doors to protect homes from evil spirits.

The brothers also appear in funeral customs. In the past, large paper figures of Fang Bi and Fang Xiang were carried at the front of funeral processions to clear the way.

Fang Xiang is also linked to the older Fangxiangshi (方相氏), a figure who drove away evil spirits during rituals and funerals. In Investiture of the Gods, Fang Bi becomes Xian Dao Shen (顯道神), while Fang Xiang becomes Kai Lu Shen (開路神).

At Jinci Temple in Taiyuan, Shanxi, two guardian statues at Shengmu Hall are traditionally believed to represent Fang Bi and Fang Xiang.
