= Zhang Guifang =

Character in the Chinese novel Fengshen Yanyi

Zhang Guifang (simplified Chinese: 张桂芳; traditional Chinese: 張桂芳; pinyin: Zhāng Guìfāng) is a character in the Ming dynasty novel Fengshen Yanyi. He is a general of the Shang dynasty and the commander of Qinglong Pass (青龙关). He can make his enemies fall from their horses by calling their names. After his death, he becomes the Sangmen Star (丧门星).

== Role in the novel ==
Wen Zhong sends Zhang Guifang to attack Xiqi with 100,000 soldiers. His vanguard commander is Feng Lin (风林). Before the battle, Huang Feihu warns Jiang Ziya about Zhang's magic. Zhang can make an enemy fall from his horse by calling his name. Jiang Ziya tells his generals not to reveal their names to him.

During the battle, Zhang uses his magic against Huang Feihu and Zhou Ji. Both fall from their horses. Feng Lin also uses magic to capture Nangong Shi. Zhang plans to send the prisoners to Zhaoge after defeating Xiqi.

Zhang's magic works by disturbing a person's three souls and seven spirits (三魂七魄). It has no effect on Nezha, whose body is made from lotus flowers. Zhang calls Nezha's name three times, but Nezha does not fall from his Wind Fire Wheels. Nezha then strikes Zhang's left arm with his Qiankun Ring and breaks it. Zhang retreats and asks Wen Zhong for help.

Wen Zhong sends the Four Saints of Nine Dragons Island to help Zhang. They are Wang Mo, Yang Sen, Gao Youqian, and Li Xingba. They heal Zhang and Feng Lin before joining the battle.

The Four Saints are defeated, and Feng Lin is killed by Huang Tianxiang. Zhang continues fighting but cannot defeat the Zhou army. He later fights Huang Tianxiang for thirty rounds before the Zhou generals surround him. Chao Tian and Chao Lei ask him to surrender, but he refuses.

Zhang fights until midday. Unable to escape, he declares his loyalty to King Zhou and kills himself with his spear. His soul goes to the Investiture Platform.

At the end of the novel, Jiang Ziya appoints Zhang Guifang as the Sangmen Star (丧门星). Feng Lin becomes the Diaoke Star (吊客星).

== Interpretations ==
Zhang Guifang's magic is a form of name-based magic. Jiang Yuxiang compares it with the demons of Lotus Flower Cave in Journey to the West, who capture people by calling their names. He traces this kind of magic to older Chinese beliefs about names and souls, including those found in the Chu Ci and the Book of Rites.

The Sangmen Star belongs to the Chinese system of shen sha (神煞). Li Tianfei explains that many stars in Fengshen Yanyi represent good or bad events rather than actual stars in the sky. Sangmen is believed to bring misfortune to a person's family during the year.
