= Jiao Ge =

Chinese official

Jiao Ge 膠鬲

Minister for the Shang dynasty
- Monarch: Di Xin

Personal details
- Known for: Serving Di Xin; Mention in Han Feizi

Chinese name
- Traditional Chinese: 膠鬲
- Simplified Chinese: 胶鬲
Transcriptions
Standard Mandarin
- Hanyu Pinyin: Jiāo Gé

Jiao Ge (膠鬲) was an official for Di Xin during the Late Shang period. Little is known about him outside of the Chinese classics.

== In traditional historiography ==
Jiao Ge is recorded in the Bamboo Annals as being sent by Di Xin to Predynastic Zhou to collect jade during the 40th year of his reign (c. 1036). Han Fei claims that the Zhou refused to give Jiao Ge the tablet, but upon Di Xin sending Fei Zhong instead, it was provided. Han Fei concludes that Fei Zhong was seen as a more suitable individual to develop ties with in the interests of eroding the moral faculty of the Shang dynasty. Mencius claims that he dealt in fish and salt in his dialogue with Gaozi, something echoed in later works such as the Book of the Later Han.

Mencius devotes particular time to Jiao Ge in his eponymous book, believing that he was of ample ability, and, along with Bi Gan and Jizi, managed to preserve the Shang state for a considerably longer period than what he would deem possible. Lüshi Chunqiu documents Jiao Ge as a traitor who conspired with Daji and King Wu of Zhou to erode the state.

== Plot in Fengshen Yanyi ==
Jiao Ge is a Grand Counselor that has been serving under the renowned Shang dynasty for many a year. Once Di Xin had unleashed a certain edict to create a large pit of spiders and snakes as to feed the seventy-one remaining maidens for holding on to their original Queen, Jiao Ge would decide it best to discuss the issue with Prince Huang Feihu.

Once the maidens began to be thrown into the pit, Jiao Ge would immediately present himself before Di Xin and wished for an answer. During Jiao Ge's anger, he would continuously blabber on at the king that killing his own people is equivalent to that of slicing of your own arms and legs. Once the king's anger was well exploded, he ordered that Jiao Ge would be thrown into the pit as well. These would be the last words of Jiao Ge before throwing himself over the Star-Picking Belvedere, "You no good bird-brain! Your name will be stinking with cruelty for thousands of years!" Thus immediately following this, other random officials would watch in horror as another loyal official killed himself for the sake of his kingdom.

Jiao Ge was appointed as the deity of Zoushu Star (奏书星) in the end.
