= Ao Run =

Dragon King of the Four Seas in Chinese religion

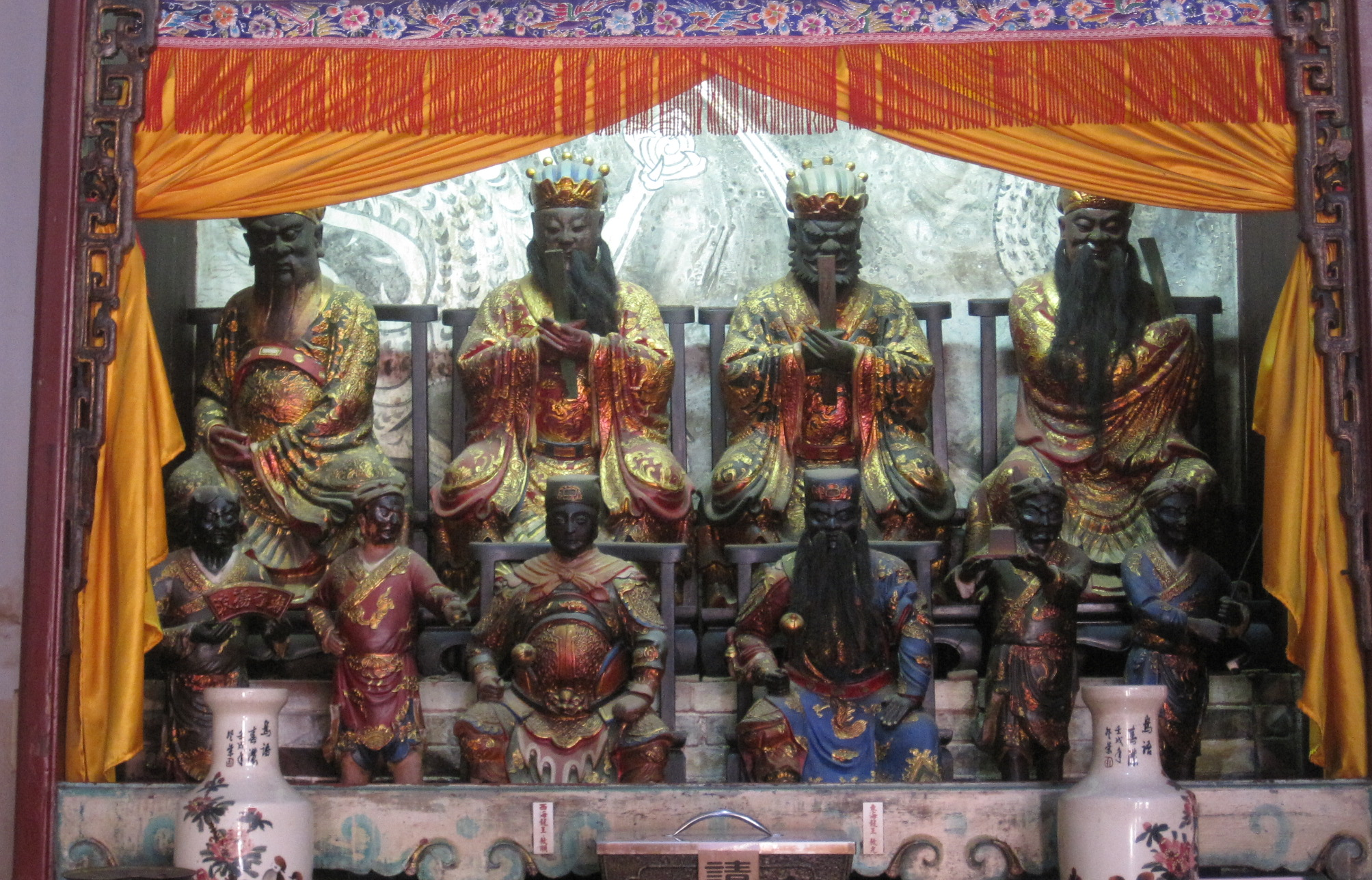
The Dragon Kings of the Four Seas at the Great Temple of Mazu in Tainan.

Ao Run (敖闰) or Ao Ji (敖吉), is the Dragon King of the West Sea (西海龙王, Xīhǎi Lóngwáng) and one of the Dragon Kings of the Four Seas in Chinese religion and Korean mythology. As an important belief in Chinese folk religion, Four Dragon King Temples are built around the place to worship the Dragon Kings.

Ao Run is the patron of Qinghai Lake and could be linked to the White Tiger as both are Chinese western gods. His brothers are Ao Guang, the Dragon King of the East Sea, Ao Qin, the Dragon King of the South Sea, and Ao Shun, the Dragon King of the North Sea.

== Legends ==
According to Legend of Qinghai (传说青海), a long time ago, the King of Dragons was very happy to see that his queen had given birth to four dragons. Many years later, the four dragons grew up, causing more and more mischievous pranks until the Dragon King was out of breath. One day, the King of Dragons came up with a way to summon all the dragon princes into the Crystal Palace. He said, "You have grown up, so you should all have your own side." Then he ordered the eldest prince Ao Guang to become the King of the East China Sea, the second prince Ao Qin to become the King of the South China Sea, and the third prince Ao Shun to become the King of the North Sea. The King of Dragons wanted to keep the little prince Ao Run beside him, but Ao Run said, "I will be the King of the West Sea!" The King of Dragons laughed and praised him. Beyond the Huaxia's Nine Provinces, Ao Run did not see the West Sea. When he came to the southern foot of Qilian Mountain, he was exhausted. He cried sadly, "How can I be the King of the West Sea without the West Sea?" Then he climbed to the top of Qilian Mountain and made a big storm, but it did not suffice. When the Jade Emperor saw this happen, he felt pity. Therefore, he sent Lord of Thunder, Mother of Lightning, Earl of Wind, and Youth of Cloud to help Ao Run. Lightning, thunder, and storms created Haizi with an area of more than 5,000 square kilometers and a depth of more than 20 meters, which became the West Sea (Qinghai Lake). Since then, Ao Run has become the Dragon King of the West Sea.

Ao Run has three children. His sons are Yulong (玉龍), who was the steed of Tang Sanzang, and Ao Moang (敖摩昂). He has a daughter named Ao Cinxin (敖寸心), also known as the Xihai Longnü (西海龙女).

== Mentioned in Korean mythology ==
In the Jakjaegeon myth, a part of the Goryeo Dynasty founding myth, Jakjaegeon kills an old Gwishin with a bow at the request of the Dragon King of the West Sea, who appears to him in a dream. The Dragon King of the West Sea gives him his daughter in gratitude, and the Dragon King of the West Sea tells Jakjaegeon that his grandson (King Taejo of Goryeo) will be king. Jakjaegeon has four sons, of which the eldest is Yong Geon, the father of King Taejo of Goryeo.

In Korean history, the Dragon King of the West Sea sent a turtle to King Changsu of Goguryeo in congratulation of his transfer of the capital to Pyongyang.

== In popular culture ==
- The generic name of the extinct genus of dinosaur Aorun, is actually a shortened masculine name of Ao Run.

== See also ==
- Bai Longma

== Sources ==
- Journey to the West. 中国画报出版社. 2003. ISBN 978-7-80024-670-8.
- 大话西游之超级小白龙 (in Chinese). renshenchujiu.
