= Li Gen (Investiture of the Gods) =

Fictional character from Investiture of the Gods

Li Gen (Chinese: 李艮; pinyin: Lǐ Gèn) is a fictional character in the Chinese novel Investiture of the Gods (Fengshen Yanyi). He is a xunhai yacha (巡海夜叉), a yaksha assigned to patrol the waters of the East Sea under Ao Guang, the Dragon King of the East Sea. In the novel, Ao Guang describes him as having been appointed by the celestial court, using the expression yubi diancha (御笔点差).

== In Investiture of the Gods ==
Li Gen appears in Chapter 12, when disturbances in the East Sea caused by Nezha's bathing alarm the Dragon King. Ao Guang orders Li Gen to investigate what is happening at the mouth of the river. Li Gen reaches the Nine-Bend River and sees Nezha bathing in the water.

The novel describes Li Gen as having a blue-indigo face, vermilion-colored hair, a large mouth and fangs, and carrying a large axe. He identifies himself as a patrol yaksha appointed by his master. After Nezha insults him, Li Gen becomes angry and attacks him with the axe. Nezha avoids the attack and strikes Li Gen with the Qiankun Circle, killing him. When Ao Guang learns of Li Gen's death, he is surprised that someone has killed an official appointed by the celestial court. He then sends his son Ao Bing with soldiers to confront Nezha, beginning the events that lead to Ao Bing's death.

At the end of the novel, Jiang Ziya assigns celestial titles to the deceased characters. Li Gen is appointed as the Great Misfortune Star (大祸星).

== Later portrayals ==
Later adaptations have given Li Gen additional background not found in the original novel. The 1984 children's novel Legend of Nezha (哪吒传) describes him as a patrol yaksha who had been appointed by the Jade Emperor. It characterizes him as someone who regularly abused his authority over others.

The expression yubi diancha (御笔点差) is also used in the original Investiture of the Gods, where Ao Guang describes Li Gen as an official appointed by the celestial court. It does not state that Li Gen himself was an incarnation or embodiment of the Jade Emperor's writing brush.
