= Nezha =

Protection deity in Chinese folk religion

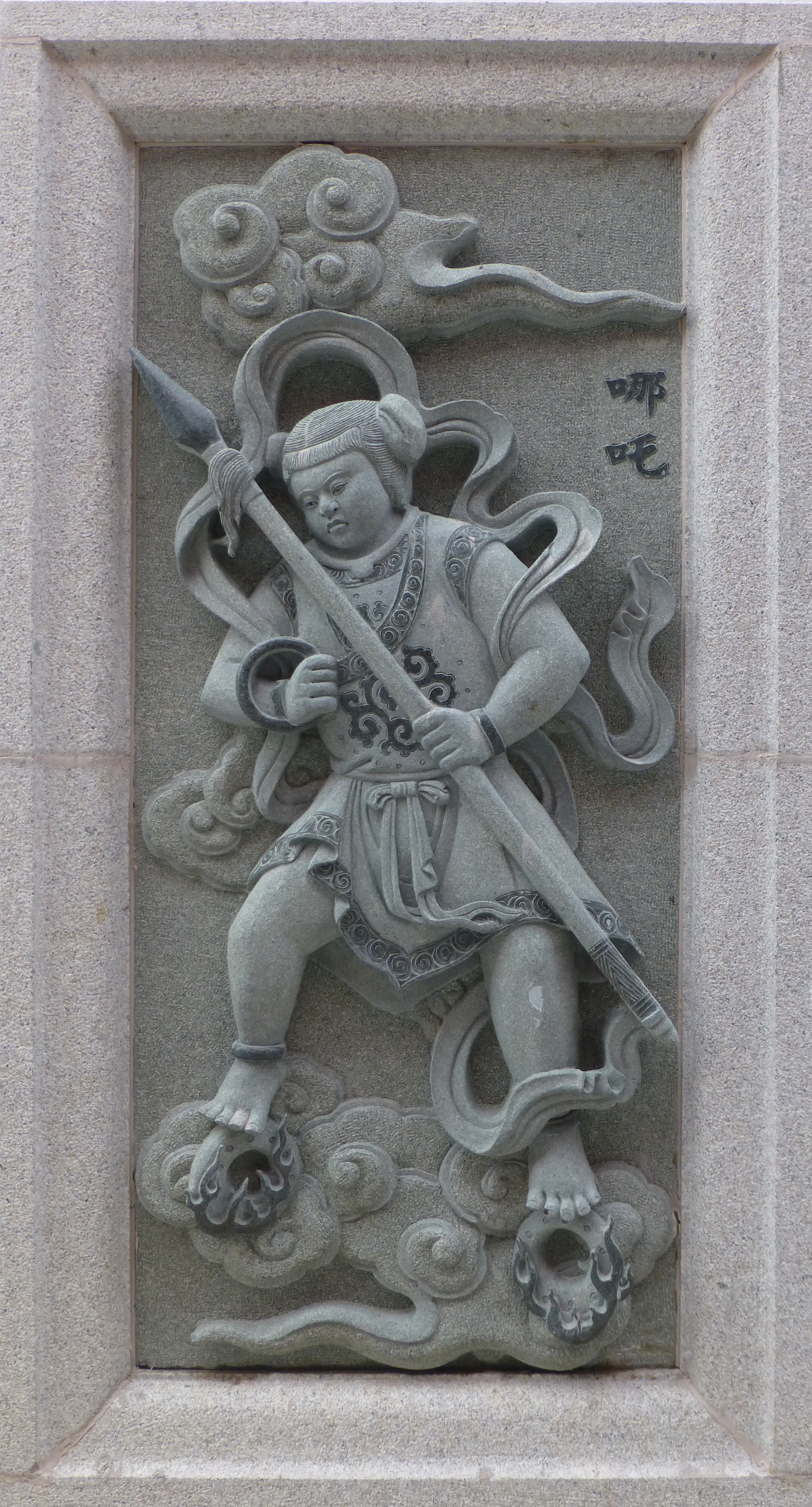
- Image of Nezha in Fengshen Yanyi.
- Chinese: 哪吒
Transcriptions
Standard Mandarin
- Hanyu Pinyin: Nézhā / Nuózhā
- Wade–Giles: Ne^{2}-cha^{1} / No^{2}-cha^{1}
- IPA: [nɤ̌ʈʂá] / [nwǒʈʂá]
Yue: Cantonese
- Jyutping: Naa4-zaa1
Southern Min
- Hokkien POJ: Lô-chhia

Marshal of the Central Altar
- Chinese: 中壇元帥
Transcriptions
Standard Mandarin
- Hanyu Pinyin: Zhōngtán Yuánshuài
Yue: Cantonese
- Jyutping: zung1taan4 jyun4seoi3

Third Lotus Prince
- Chinese: 蓮花三太子
Transcriptions
Standard Mandarin
- Hanyu Pinyin: Liánhuā Sāntàizǐ
Yue: Cantonese
- Jyutping: lin4-faa1 saam1taai3zi2

Nezha (哪吒, Nézhā) or sometimes Nezha the Crown Prince (哪吒太子, Nézhā Tàizǐ), or Natha, is a protection deity in Taoism, Buddhism, Confucianism, and Chinese folk religion. His official Taoist name is "Marshal of the Central Altar" (中壇元帥). He was then given the title "Third Lotus Prince" (蓮花三太子) after he became a deity. The deity Nezha developed as a localization of Nalakuvara, a Hindu yaksha, as Buddhist Jataka tales were transmitted into China and began influencing local beliefs.

== Legend ==
According to Fengshen Yanyi, Nezha was born during the Shang dynasty in a military fortress at Chentang Pass, as the incarnation of Lingzhu Zi (靈珠子), who is destined to assist King Wu of Zhou in the upcoming war against the Shang. His father was the military commander Li Jing, who later became the "Pagoda-wielding Heavenly King". Nezha's mother, Lady Yin, gave birth to a ball of flesh after gestating for three years and six months. Li Jing thought his wife had given birth to a demon and attacked the ball with his sword. The ball split open, and Nezha jumped out as a boy instead of an infant. Nezha could jump and walk immediately after birth. He was later accepted by the immortal Taiyi Zhenren as a student. He had two older brothers, Jinzha, a disciple of Wenshu Guangfa Tianzun, and Muzha, disciple of Puxian Zhenren.

When Nezha was seven years old, he asked his mother for permission to go play outside of Chentang Pass. She agreed, on the condition that he took a family servant with him. After walking for about a mile, he became sick of the summer heat, and decided to take a bath in the nearby Jiuwan Stream, using his weapon, a red sash named Huntian Ling (混天绫) as a towel. It sent tremors through the water, shaking the East Sea Dragon King, Ao Guang's undersea palace. A Yaksha, Li Gen, was sent to investigate the disturbance. Nezha insulted him, causing him to attack Nezha and be killed by his golden ring called the Qiankun Quan (乾坤圈). The Dragon King's soldiers reported Li Gen's death to him, and Ao Bing, his third son, volunteered to deal with Nezha.

Nezha slew him in combat, then pulled out his tendons to make a belt for Li Jing. When Ao Guang learned of his son's death, he transformed into a human scholar and went to Li Jing's residence to protest. Nezha admitted to killing Ao Bing and returned his tendons to Ao Guang, who told Li Jing he would file a complaint to the Jade Emperor.

Facing his parents' wrath, Nezha went to Taiyi Zhenren for help. He drew an invisibility talisman on Nezha and told him to ambush Ao Guang under the Heavenly Gate. Nezha subjected the Dragon King to a beating, then forced him to turn into a small snake and return to Chentang Pass with him. Upon arrival, Ao Guang transformed back into his human form, proclaiming he would gather the other Dragon Kings of the Four Seas and report the Li family to the Jade Emperor together, before disappearing in a breeze.

Lady Yin then sent Nezha into the back garden. He climbed up the barbican, where he came across the weapons Qiankun Bow (乾坤弓) and Zhengtian Arrows (震天箭) of the Yellow Emperor, sitting on a weapon rack. Eager for some archery practice, he lifted the bow and shot an arrow into the air, which flew all the way to White Bone Cave and killed the Verdant Cloud Boy, an acolyte of Empress Shiji/Lady Rock (石磯娘娘). Because Li Jing had carved his name onto the arrow, Shiji went to Chentang Pass, seized him, and took him back to her abode.

Li Jing explained to her that no one had been strong enough to lift the Yellow Emperor's bow since it was placed in Chentang Pass, and she allowed him to return to the pass to find the real culprit. When he learned that Nezha was responsible, he took his son back to the White Bone Cave to answer to Lady Rock. Nezha attacked her other acolyte and tried to fight the demonness, but had both of his weapons taken away, forcing him to flee to his master's abode. Taiyi Zhenren killed Shiji with the flames of the Jiulong Shenhuo Zhao (九龍神火罩; lit: Nine Dragon Divine Bell Cover), reducing her to her true form: a rock.

Taiyi then informed Nezha that the Dragon Kings of the Four Seas, with the permission of the Jade Emperor, had come for his parents.To save his family, Nezha killed himself then, carving up his own flesh and dismembering his bones, "returning" these to his parents in repayment for the debt of his birth.

Nezha then appeared in his mother's dream. In the dream, he asked her to build a temple for him, so that his soul would have a place to rest. This constitutes a link to Nezha's birth because the night before Nezha was born, Lady Yin had a dream where a Taoist put something into her bosom and told her to take this child. In both instances, a dream was used to communicate a message.

His mother then secretly built a temple for Nezha, and this temple later flourished. This temple became well-known and grew vastly because of Nezha's efficiency at granting prayers. However, Li Jing soon found out about this temple and burned it down because he was still angry at Nezha and felt that he had already caused too much trouble for their family.

Li Jing burning the temple caused Nezha to desire his father's death. Thus, the enmity between father and son grew. Nezha was later brought back to life by his teacher, Taiyi Zhenren, who used lotus roots to construct a human body for his soul and gave him two new weapons: the Wind Fire Wheels (風火輪) and the Fire-tipped Spear (火尖槍). With the reincarnation of Nezha by his master, Li Jing and Nezha fought many battles. However, Li Jing soon realized that his mortal body was no match for Nezha and so he ran for his life. On the run, he met his second son, Muzha, who fought and was defeated by Nezha. At this, Li Jing attempted suicide but was stopped by Wenshu Guangfa Tianzun, who also tried to subdue Nezha. In the end, Nezha was forced to submit to his father by another deity, Randeng Daoren.

In popular culture, Nezha's killing of Li Gen and Ao Bing is often seen as a result of Ao Guang demanding young boys and girls from Chentang Pass as sacrifices. When the Dragon Kings of the Four Seas threatened to flood Chentang Pass in retaliation, Nezha committed suicide to save his family and the people.

The above plot is only found in the 1979 Shanghai Animation Film Studio movie, Nezha Conquers the Dragon King, and not in the Fengshen Yanyi novel or Qing dynasty opera adaptations. The 19th century Guci manuscript, Fengshen Bang, is the earliest source that mentions the flooding of Chentang Pass: the North Sea Dragon King, Ao Ji, first proposed the idea during the four Dragon Kings' gathering. However, the South Sea Dragon King, Ao Shun, convinced his brothers to submit a complaint to the Jade Emperor together instead.

According to The Journey to the West, Nezha was born with the word Ne written on the palm of his left hand and zha on his right, hence his name. But after he caused havoc in the Eastern Ocean, the Heavenly King had been so worried about the disastrous consequences that he decided to kill Nezha. Then Nezha committed suicide, then his soul went to the Buddha, who resurrected him. After, he used his vast powers to subdue 96 caves of demons through his magic. After this Nezha wanted to kill his father to avenge his suicide. The father had no choice but to seek help from the Buddha. The Buddha gave him an intricately made golden pagoda, in each story of which were Buddhas radiant with splendor. The Buddha told Nezha to regard these Buddhas as his father, thus ending the hatred between the father and the son, and it also was the reason Li Jing earned the title of Pagoda-Bearing Heavenly king.

== Iconography ==
According to the description in Fengshen Yanyi, Nezha wears a lotus petal outfit. He is often depicted as a youth, although he does sometimes appear as an adult from time to time. He is often shown flying in the sky riding on the Wind Fire Wheels (風火輪), has the Universe Ring (乾坤圈) around his body (sometimes in his left hand), the Red Armillary Sash (浑天绫) around his shoulders and a Fire-tipped Spear (火尖槍) in his right hand.

In the description in Journey to the West, Nezha’s appearance differs. In it, Nezha wears armor. He is shown in his "three heads and six arms" form (三頭六臂), holding 6 weapons: demon-slaying sword (斩妖剑), demon-slicing scimitar (嵌妖刀), demon-binding noose (缚妖索), demon-subduing pestle (降妖杖), an embroidered ball (绣球花) and fire wheel (火轮兒). Also, in the original Journey to the West, Nezha never rode the Wind Fire Wheels and mostly flew himself, so Nezha in Journey to the West completely lacks the Wind and Fire Wheels (風火轮), Universe Ring (乾坤圈), Red Armillary Sash (浑天绫), and Fire-tipped Spear (火尖槍).

The television series Journey to the West (1986 TV series) adapted the character of Nezha directly from Fengshen Yanyi instead of from the Journey to the West. In Journey to the West (1986 TV series), Nezha has the Wind-Fire Wheels (風火輪), the Universe Ring, the Red Armillary Sash, and the Fire-Tipped Spear despite the fact that the Nezha in the original Journey to the West did not have these. Moreover, in the original Journey to the West, the Fire Wheel is not used for riding, as many people believe, but is the weapon used by Nezha to defeat the Bull Demon King. Nezha threw the Fire Wheel at the Bull Demon King's horn; the Bull Demon King was severely burned by its flame. In the battle against the Single Horned King (独角大王), when the monster used the Vajra Ring (金刚琢) to suck all of Nezha's treasures, including the Fire Wheel, Nezha flew away and retreated, leading to the misunderstanding that the Fire Wheel is the Wind and Fire Wheel, which in turn has led to the confusion that Nezha from Journey to the West and Nezha from Fengshen Yanyi are the same character. Later on, very few adaptations of Journey to the West portrayed Nezha as he appears in the novel. Most subsequent versions of Journey to the West have used the image of Nezha from Fengshen Yanyi, even though it does not match the Journey to the West. In fact, the two Nezhas of Journey to the West and Fengshen Yanyi are completely different.

In the Yuan dynasty Sanjiao Soushen Daquan (Complete Collection of Deities of the Three Religions), prior to his reincarnation into the mortal realm, Nezha was a great immortal under the Jade Emperor, who wears a golden wheel around his head, has three heads, nine eyes, and eight arms, and can blow azure clouds out of his mouth. After his suicide and resurrection by the Buddha, he wields a spear and an embroidered ball.

=== Origin ===
According to Meir Shahar, the name Nezha comes from Nalakuvara, depicted as a heroic yaksha general in the Mahamayuri. The link to Nalakuvara is established through variants in his Chinese name appearing in translations of Tantric Buddhist Texts.

The original variant 那羅鳩婆羅 changed to 捺羅俱跋羅, 那吒矩韈囉 and finally 那吒 (Nazha). The simple addition of the "mouth radical" (口) to Na (那) changes the name to the current form Nezha (哪吒).

In addition, Nalakuvara's father Kubera was eventually absorbed into the Buddhist pantheon as the Heavenly King Vaiśravaṇa. Shahar notes that Vaisravana was somehow connected to the historical Tang Dynasty general Li Jing. This explains the name and position of Nezha's father, the Pagoda-Bearing Heavenly King Li Jing.

=== Worship ===
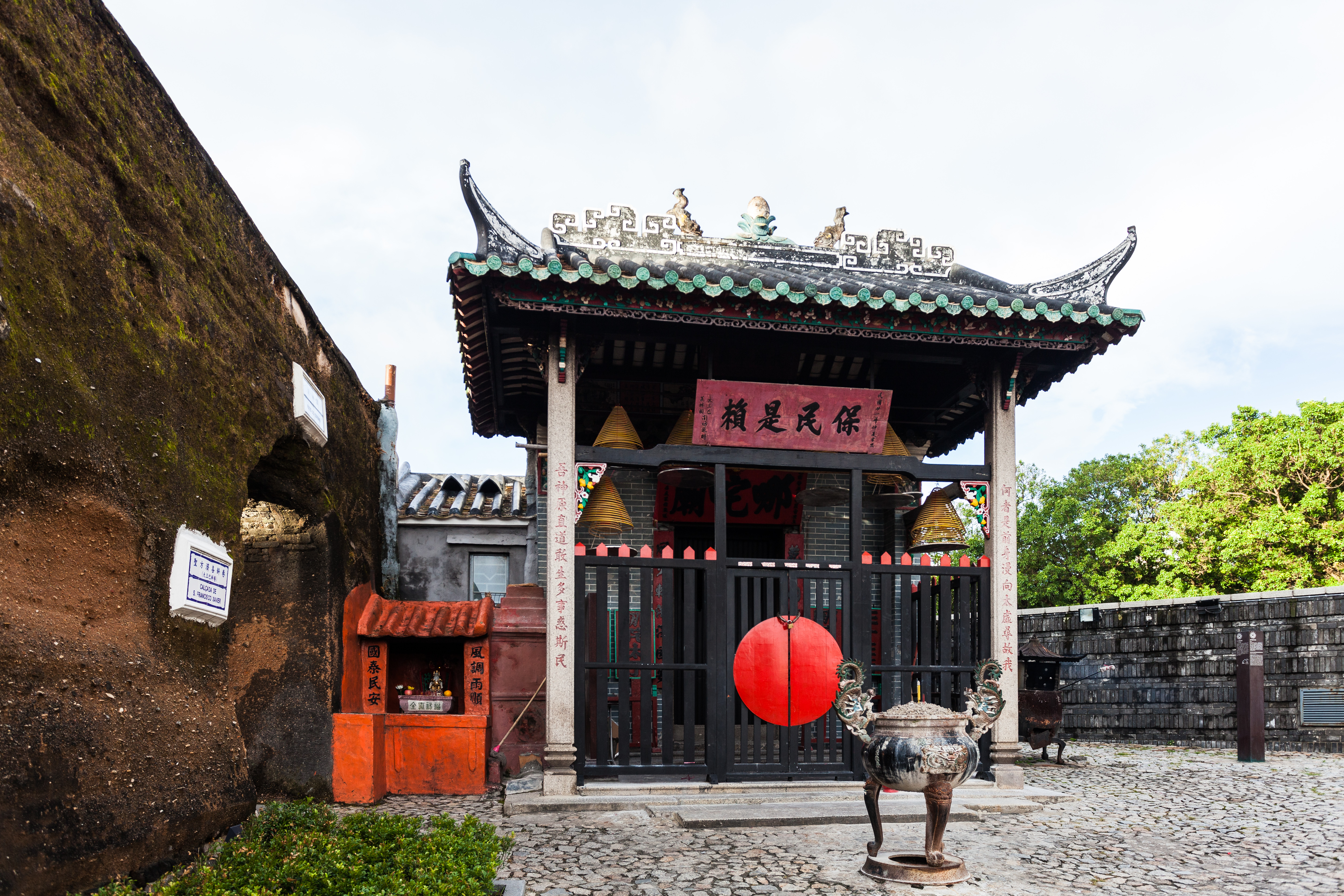
Na Tcha Temple of the Centre of Macau, a Nezha temple behind the Ruins of St. Paul, in Macau.

Nezha is worshipped in Chinese folk religion and is called "Marshal of the Central Altar" (三坛大会元帅), or the "Third Prince" (三太子).

As in traditional folklore, Nezha flies around swiftly on his wind fire wheels, so he is also regarded as the tutelary god of many professional drivers, like trucks, taxis, or sightseeing bus drivers. They tend to place a small statue of Nezha in the vehicles for a safe drive.

Nezha is also often regarded as the patron god of children and filial piety. Parents would make an offering to Nezha with the hope that their children would grow up strong, healthy, and be dutiful and respectful.

== Influence ==
=== Arts ===
Nezha has frequently appeared in Chinese mythology and ancient Chinese literature such as Fengshen Yanyi (or Investiture of the Gods), although the story of Nezha Conquering the Sea is the most well known among Chinese households.

In Journey to the West, Nezha was a general under his father, "Pagoda-Beating Heavenly King" Li Jing. He fought the Monkey King, Sun Wukong, when the latter rebelled against the Jade Emperor. They later became friends. Nezha made some appearances in the novel to help the four protagonists defeat powerful demons including his adoptive sister, Lady Earth Flow.

Nezha is a recurring character in R. F. Kuang's 2018 novel The Poppy War and her trilogy of the same name. In the series Nezha is the second son of a powerful warlord in a country loosely based on China.

=== Media ===
Nezha has been the central character in over 20 different films and television programs, both live-action and animated, dating back at least as early as a pre-communist Chinese live-action feature film, Nézhā Chūshì (Chinese: 哪吒出世; lit. 'Birth of Nezha'), produced by the Great Wall Film Company and premiered, according to differing accounts, in either 1927 or 1928. In addition, he has appeared as a supporting character in numerous others, chiefly among the many adaptations of Investiture of the Gods and Journey to the West.

The character increased in popularity in 1979 with the animated feature film Nezha Conquers the Dragon King, which was screened at the 1980 Cannes Film Festival and is considered one of the great classic works of Chinese animation. On 30 May 2014, Google paid homage to this film with an animated doodle on their Hong Kong search engine's homepage.

Nezha appears in Ryo Fujisaki's manga Houshin Engi. The romaji for his name is "Nataku". He's aloof and very blunt.

In 2003, China Central Television began the broadcast of a new children's traditionally-animated series The Legend of Nezha, which originally ran from 2003 to 2004, for a total of 52 episodes.

In 2016, an animated feature film, I Am Nezha, was released in China.

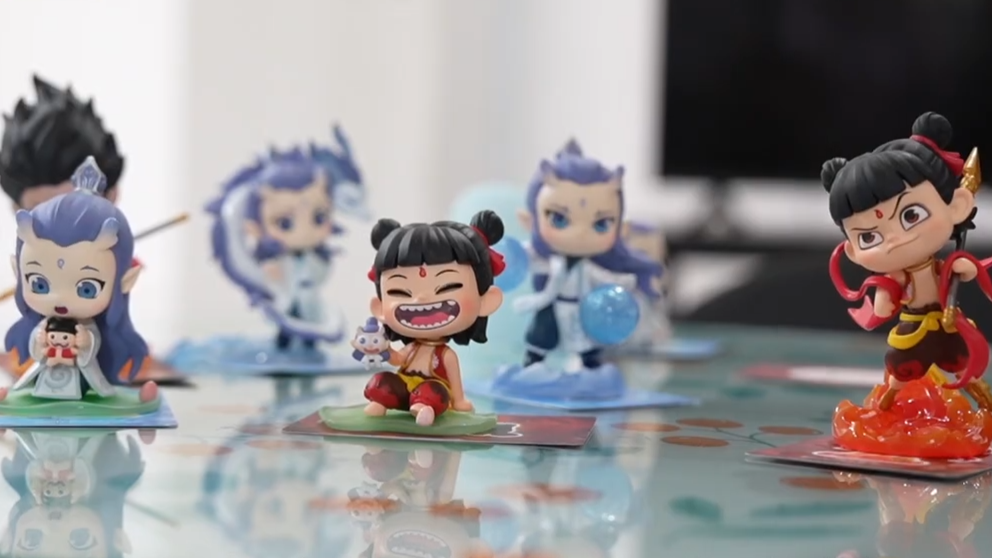
Figurines of Nezha (and Ao Bing) as they appear in the film Ne Zha and its sequel.

On 26 July 2019, another animated feature film, Ne Zha, was more successful, setting numerous all-time records for box-office grosses, including third-highest-grossing of all films in China and highest-grossing animated film from outside the United States. A sequel, Ne Zha 2 (2025), set further box office records, becoming the highest-grossing film in China, and the highest grossing non-English language film of all time, and the highest grossing animated movie of all time.

Still in 2019, he appeared as a secondary character in the animated movie The Legend of Hei, as a prominent figure of the guild of spirits. He made another similar apparition in the sequel of this movie, released in 2025.

The 2021 animated film New Gods: Nezha Reborn depicts Nezha reincarnated in a cyberpunk setting 3,000 years after the original story.

In 2017, Hasbro announced that Nezha would appear in a crossover with the Transformers franchise. The series, titled My Nezha and Transformers, consists of 52 11-minute episodes and is produced by Allspark Animation and China Central Television. The series premiered in 2025.

The character has also been evoked outside of the fantasy genre, in realistic contemporary and period drama films as a byword for a rebellious, nonconformist young person, such as in Rebels of the Neon God (Chinese: 青少年哪吒; pinyin: Qīngshàonián Nézhā; lit. 'Adolescent Nezha', 1992), Spin Kid (Chinese: 電哪吒; pinyin: Diàn Nézhā; lit. 'Electric Nezha', 2011), Nezha (Chinese: 少女哪吒; pinyin: Shàonǚ Nézhā; lit. 'Girl Nezha', 2014) and Operation Mekong (2016, in which a character is codenamed Nezha).

Nezha is featured as a character in the 2020 TV series Lego Monkie Kid.

=== Video games ===
Nezha is a playable character in Koei Tecmo's crossover series Warriors Orochi. The series features two different versions of Nezha, a cyborg and his human self.

Ne Zha is a playable character in the multiplayer online battle arena video game Smite, where he is a melee assassin.

On December 16, 2015, third-person shooter action game Warframe released a playable character named and themed after Nezha.

Nezha is also a collectible character in Netmarble's mobile RPG Seven Knights where the character, while depicted as female, retains much of Nezha's mythos and characteristics.

Nezha is also a summonable Heroic Spirit in the popular Japanese hero collector game Fate/Grand Order where she can be summoned as a Lancer-class Servant. In the game, she is depicted as a female automaton. The game's second storyline, Cosmos in the Lostbelt, explores an alternate history where Qin Shi Huang successfully becomes immortal by studying her body, allowing him to rule China into the present day.

Nezha is also a summonable Astromon in the Korean creature capture game Monster Super League developed by 4:33 and Creative Labs. In the game, he is depicted as female.

Nezha is also a summonable character in the Japanese LGBT+ mobile game Tokyo Afterschool Summoners developed by Lifewonders. Within the game he is depicted as non-binary.

In 2022, the video game Overwatch (2016), made a skin based on Nezha for Tracer, a female character, as part of the Lunar New Year Event.

In the 2021 mobile game Digimon New Century, Nezha is depicted as Nezhamon, a Cyborg Digimon with flaming hair and staff, riding on two large wheels.

In the 2022 mobile game Dislyte, The character Li Ling is given the powers of Nezha.

In the 2024 PC and Xbox video game Age of Mythology: Retold, Nezha is featured as hero (both in child and adult forms) for the Chinese pantheon added in the expansion Immortal Pillars in 2025.

Nezha, with his fire-tipped spear, is the title character in the casino game The Third Prince. The game's battle feature draws on elements of Nezha's story.

== See also ==
- Bala Krishna
- CAMSAP3, also known as Nezha
- Nalakuvara
- Thánh Gióng
- Peacock Princess
