= Mae Taeng =

Mae Taeng may refer to:

- Mae Taeng District
- Mae Taeng Subdistrict
