= Bua Tong Waterfall =

- น้ำตกบัวตอง
- Interactive map of Bua Tong Waterfall
- Location: Mae Ho Phra, Mae Taeng district, Chiang Mai province, Thailand
- Coordinates: 19.0680°N 99.0795°E
- Type: Limestone waterfall
- Watercourse: Huai Mae Pon

Bua Tong Waterfall (Thai: น้ำตกบัวตอง), also known as the Sticky Waterfall, is a limestone waterfall in Mae Ho Phra, Mae Taeng district, Chiang Mai province, Thailand. It is located in the Mae Taeng National Forest Reserve area.

== Geography ==
Bua Tong Waterfall is about 100 metres high and has several levels. Water from the waterfall flows into Huai Mae Pon. The stream is supplied by Chet Si Fountain, a cold natural spring upstream from the waterfall.

The area consists of mountains, valleys and streams. Elevations in the proposed national park area range from 350 to 947 metres above sea level. The area lies along the Mae Pon fault, where fractures in the rock allow groundwater to reach the surface as springs.

The waterfall is formed by limestone deposits. Calcium carbonate in the water forms deposits on the stream bed, giving the surface a pale and rough texture. This surface allows visitors to walk and climb on parts of the waterfall.

Chet Si Fountain supplies water to the waterfall throughout the year. Water from the spring passes through sedimentary and metamorphic rocks and contains dissolved minerals, including calcium and silica, before flowing towards the waterfall.

== Bua Tong Waterfall–Chet Si Fountain National Park ==
In 2022, the Bua Tong Waterfall–Chet Si Fountain area was proposed as a national park. The Department of National Parks surveyed the area and sought public comments on the proposal. The proposed area covered about 85.33 square kilometres in the Mae Taeng and San Sai national forest reserves.

== Tourism ==
Bua Tong Waterfall is known for its limestone surface, which allows visitors to walk and climb along parts of the waterfall. The waterfall has several pools and streams where visitors can sit and play in the water. Chet Si Fountain, located upstream, is another attraction in the area.

In November 2025, the Department of National Parks reported that more than 2,500 foreign tourists visited the Bua Tong Waterfall–Chet Si Fountain area after the Yi Peng festival in Chiang Mai.
