= Ban Chang =

Ban Chang may refer to:

- Ban Chang, Chiang Mai, a tambon (subdistrict) of Mae Taeng District, in Chiang Mai Province, Thailand.
- Ban Chang (town), a tambon (subdistrict) and a thesaban mueang (town) in Ban Chang District, in Rayong Province, Thailand.
- Ban Chang District, an amphoe (district) of Rayong Province, Thailand.
