= Kaeng Kuet =

Place in Chiang Mai, Thailand

Kaeng Kuet (Thai: แก่งกื้ด, pronounced [kɛ̀ŋ kɯ̂ːt], "Kuet rapids") is a place that has many water activities and is located in Chiang Mai a northern province in Thailand. Kaeng Kuet is very popular place for foreigners who come for water rafting. The location of Kaeng Kuet is surrounded by nature. The place is frequented by a steady stream of people. Mostly in the hot season activities there are a lot of people who come for relaxing and swimming whereas in the rainy season, the water is quite suitable for rafting. Kuet River is located at Ban Sop Kai in Mae Taeng district at Chiang Mai. Kaeng Kuet also has other activities to support tourists and visitors such as elephant rides, elephant trekking, and cycling.

== Activities ==
A highlight of Kaeng Kuet is the rubber boat activities. The rubber boat is ideal for rafting and adventure. There are various levels to difficulty for rafting starting from second level to fifth level and that is the best level for rafting with rubber boat. Kaeng Kuet has a lot of rocks and winding currents and surrounded by forests and nature. In addition, Kaeng Kuet has an elephant ride activity. The visitors can ride an elephant and try to wash the elephant at Kaeng Kued Elephant Camp.
