= Dragon King =

Chinese water and weather deity

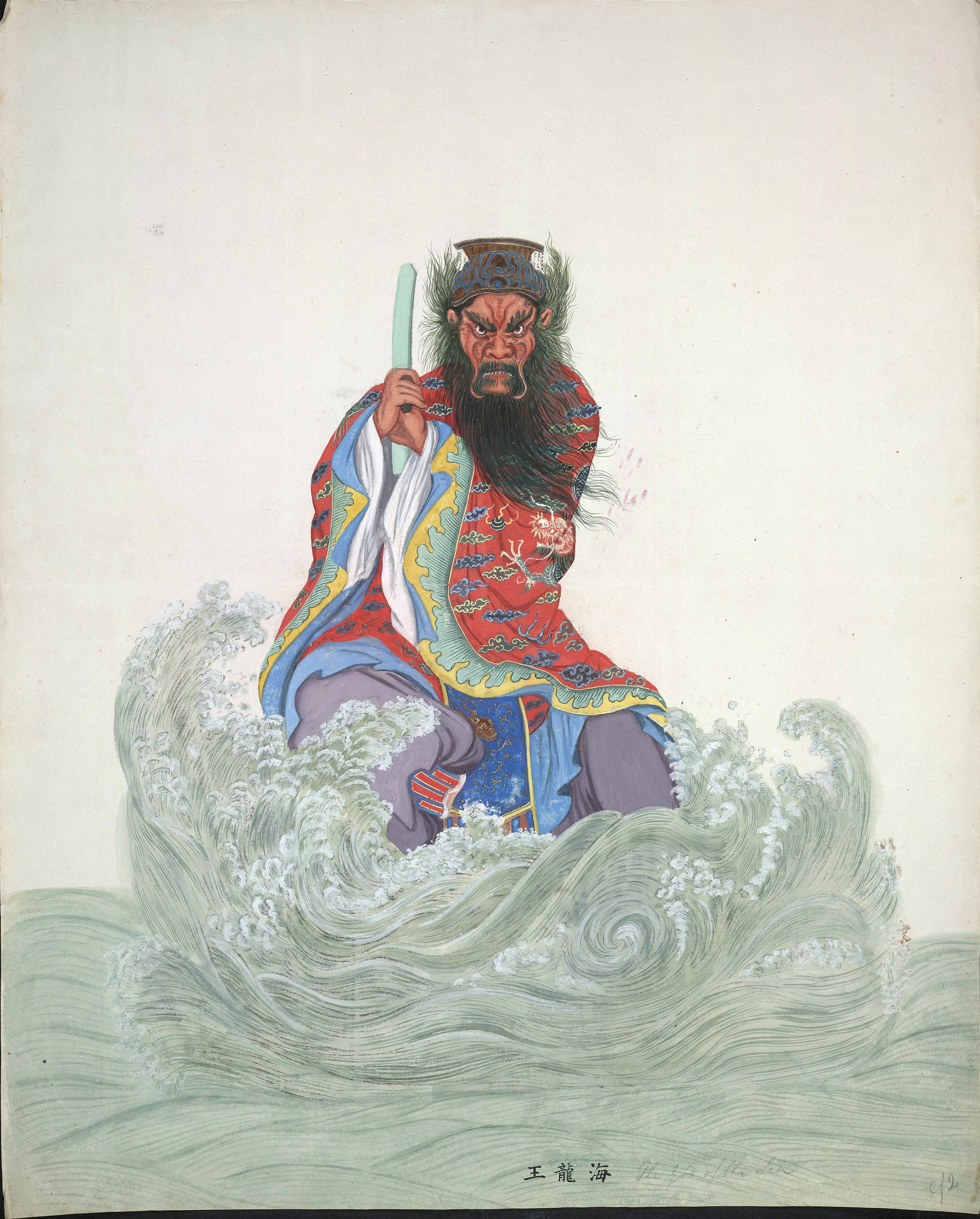
- Dragon King of the Seas (海龍王), painted in the first half of the 19th century.

Chinese name
- Traditional Chinese: 龍王
- Simplified Chinese: 龙王
- Literal meaning: Dragon King; Dragon Prince
Transcriptions
Standard Mandarin
- Hanyu Pinyin: Lóngwáng
Yue: Cantonese
- Jyutping: lung4wong4

Alternative Chinese name
- Traditional Chinese: 龍神
- Simplified Chinese: 龙神
- Literal meaning: Dragon God
Transcriptions
Standard Mandarin
- Hanyu Pinyin: Lóngshén

Vietnamese name
- Vietnamese alphabet: Long Vương
- Chữ Hán: 龍王

The Dragon King, also known as the Dragon God, is a celestial creature, water and weather god in Asian mythology. They can be found in various cultural and religious symbolic materials all around Asia, specifically in South, Southeast Asia and distinctly in East Asian cultures (Chinese folk-religion). He is known in many different names across Asia depending on the local language such as, Ryū in Japanese. (Korean Dragon, Indian Dragon, Vietnamese Dragon and more)

He can manipulate and control the weather, move seasons and bring rainfall with his divine power at his own will, thus, he is regarded as the dispenser of rain, divine ruler of the Seas, rivers and water bodies, commanding over all bodies of water. He is the collective personification of the ancient concept of the lóng in Chinese culture and Nāgarāja in Indian culture. It is described that they have their own under-water palace and a royal court system of their own.

There are also the cosmological "Dragon Kings of the Four Seas" (四海龍王; Sihai Longwang).

Besides being a water deity, the Dragon God frequently also serves as a territorial tutelary deity, similarly to Tudigong "Lord of the Earth" and Houtu "Queen of the Earth".

Serpent like creatures have been regarded as core part of Asian culture since 7000–5000 BCE (Neolithic period) at least. Numerous Serpent like crafts, marks and designs have been discovered in many archeological sites from south, southeast and east asia (Notably from ancient archeological sites of China and India), which proves that the serpent/naga/dragon symbolically has been part of the local folklores, rituals and festivals in these areas from a really long time. As time has passed the Dragon culture has been adapted and shifted in various forms, terms, tales and cultures through generation around these regions and the folk-religious cultures.

== Singular Dragon King ==
Late Qing dynasty goauche painting of a Dragon King.

The Dragon King has been regarded as holding dominion over all bodies of water, (Note: In a modern local ritual (cf. Changli County), the inscription reads "[...] Dragon King of the Four Seas, Five Lakes, Eight Rivers and Nine Streams (in sum, the lord of all the waters) [...]".) and the dispenser of rain, in rituals practiced into the modern era in China. One of his epithets is Dragon King of Wells and Springs.

=== Rainmaking rituals ===
Dragon processions have been held on the fifth and sixth moon of the lunisolar calendar all over China, especially on the 13th day of the sixth moon, held to be the Dragon King's birthday, as ritualized supplication to the deity to make rain. In Changli County, Hebei Province a procession of sorts carried an image of the Dragon King in a basket and made circuit around nearby villages, and the participants would put out in front of their house a piece of yellow paper calligraphed with the text: "The position [=tablet] of the Dragon King of the Four Seas 四海龍王之位, Five Lakes, Eight Rivers and Nine Streams", sprinkle it with water using willow withes, and burning incense next to it. This ritual was practiced in North of China into the 20th century.

In the past, there used to be Dragon King miao shrines all over China, for the folk to engage in the worship of dragon kings, villages in farm countries would conduct rites dedicated to the Dragon Kings seeking rain.

In the Indian Subcontinent, South and South-east Asia, Naga/Dragon worship is an ancient tradition often associated with rainfall and fertility, particularly during the monsoon season through offerings incense, milk, turmeric, and flowers in Nāga shrines, temples, carved stones (Nāga stones) or more elaborate structures. Naga worship predates Vedic traditions and was later integrated into Hinduism, Buddhism, Shamanism and Jainism. There is a Hindu festival Naga panchami dedicated to serpent deities. There are numerous Serpent/Dragon deities and numerous temples or shrines dedicated to them such as Sagara, Varuna is also one of the oldest deities, often depicted as the God of the oceans, rivers, and all water bodies. People offer prayers and other offerings for rainmaking rituals and agriculture.

In Japan, rainmaking rituals, one of these is known as "amagoi" (雨乞い) which has been practiced for centuries for rain during the times of drought. These rainmaking rituals varied and often involve Shinto and Buddhist ceremonies, with prayers, offerings and symbolic actions aimed to influence weather patterns and please the heaven. The water-related deities and dragons are central to these rituals. Many Japanese Shinto shrines have dragon imagery which are dedicated to the dragon god, reflecting their importance in the religion.

In Korea, Dragons are rather worshiped through folk beliefs and rituals. Yongwang is honored in village rituals, mainly in fishing communities. Prayers are offered for successful catches and safe voyages, rain and agriculture. Buddhist monks would sometimes burn their forearms or fingers in supplication for rain. In ancient Korea, rainmaking rituals were called "Giuje" (祈雨祭) which used to be performed during times of drought to invoke rain. These rituals varied and involved both government officials and commoners. It also included Buddhist monks and female shamans to perform the rituals. In one of the rituals named "Seokcheok-dongja" (石尺童子), children would torment a lizard (symbolizing a dragon) in the belief that it would induce the dragon to bring rain.

=== As Protector ===
Dragon or Naga also symbolically represents good luck and protection in the Asian culture. They symbolize wisdom, strength, and good fortune, embodying a fierce compassion that safeguards the sacred knowledge and maintains cosmic balance. In religion, they are revered as powerful protectors of the Dharma and the teachings.

Dragons/Nagas stand guard at all Buddhist temples throughout Thailand, Laos, Myanmar, Cambodia and Malaysia. In Indonesia, Nagas are often depicted battling garuḍas. Carved nāga art and sculptures are found as stairs railings in bridges or stairs, such as those found in Balinese temples, Ubud monkey forest, and Taman Sari in Yogyakarta. (Main article Nāga)

Moreover, nāgas are sometimes linked to medicine due to the symbolizing of knowledge, wisdom and protection. The nāgas can also be founded substituting the snakes in either Rod of Asclepius or Caduceus of several medical field's symbols. In legends, Nāga Vasuki is present in the legend of the Samudra Manthana, in which Dhanvantari (god of Ayurveda, Asian traditional medicine or alchemist) and amrita (the elixir of eternal life) were churned from the Ocean of Milk by him.

=== Daoist pantheon ===
Within the Daoist pantheon, the Dragon King is regarded the zoomorphic representation of the yang masculine power of generation. The dragon king is the king of the dragons and he also controls all of the creatures in the sea. The dragon king gets his orders from the Jade Emperor.(Main article Chinese Dragon)

== Dragon Kings of the Five Regions ==
Historically there arose a cult of the Five Dragon Kings. The name Wufang longwang (五方龍王; "Dragon Kings of the Five Regions/Directions") is registered in Daoist scripture from the Tang dynasty, found in the Dunhuang caves. Veneration of chthonic dragon god(s) of the five directions still persists today in southern areas, such as Canton and Fujian. It has also been conflated with the cult of Lord Earth, Tugong (Tudigong), and inscriptions on tablets invoke the Wufang wutu longshen (五方五土龍神; "Dragon Spirits of the Five Directions and Five Soils") in rituals current in Southeast Asia (Vietnam).

=== Description ===
The Azure Dragon or Blue-Green Dragon (靑龍; Qīnglóng), or Green Dragon (蒼龍; Cānglóng), is the Dragon God of the east, and of the essence of spring. Azure Dragon is associated as the Dragon King of the East sea, Ao Guang.

The Red Dragon (赤龍; Chìlóng or 朱龍; Zhūlóng, literally "Cinnabar Dragon", "Vermilion Dragon") is the Dragon God of the south and of the essence of summer. The Red Dragon is associated as the Dragon king of the South sea, Ao Qin.

The White Dragon (白龍; Báilóng) is the Dragon God of the west and the essence of autumn. The White Dragon is associated as the Dragon King of the West sea, Ao Run.

The Yellow Dragon (黃龍; Huánglóng) is the Dragon God of the center, associated with (late) summer. (Note: Yellow Emperor is sometimes considered an incarnation of the Yellow dragon.) Yellow Dragon is directly associated as Jade Emperor and Yellow Emperor, it is considered that the mythical Emperor is the reincarnation of the Yellow Dragon.

The Black Dragon (黑龍; Hēilóng), also called "Dark Dragon" or "Mysterious Dragon" (玄龍; Xuánlóng), is the Dragon God of the north and the essence of winter. The Black Dragon is associated as the Dragon King of the North sea, Ao Shun.

=== Broad history ===
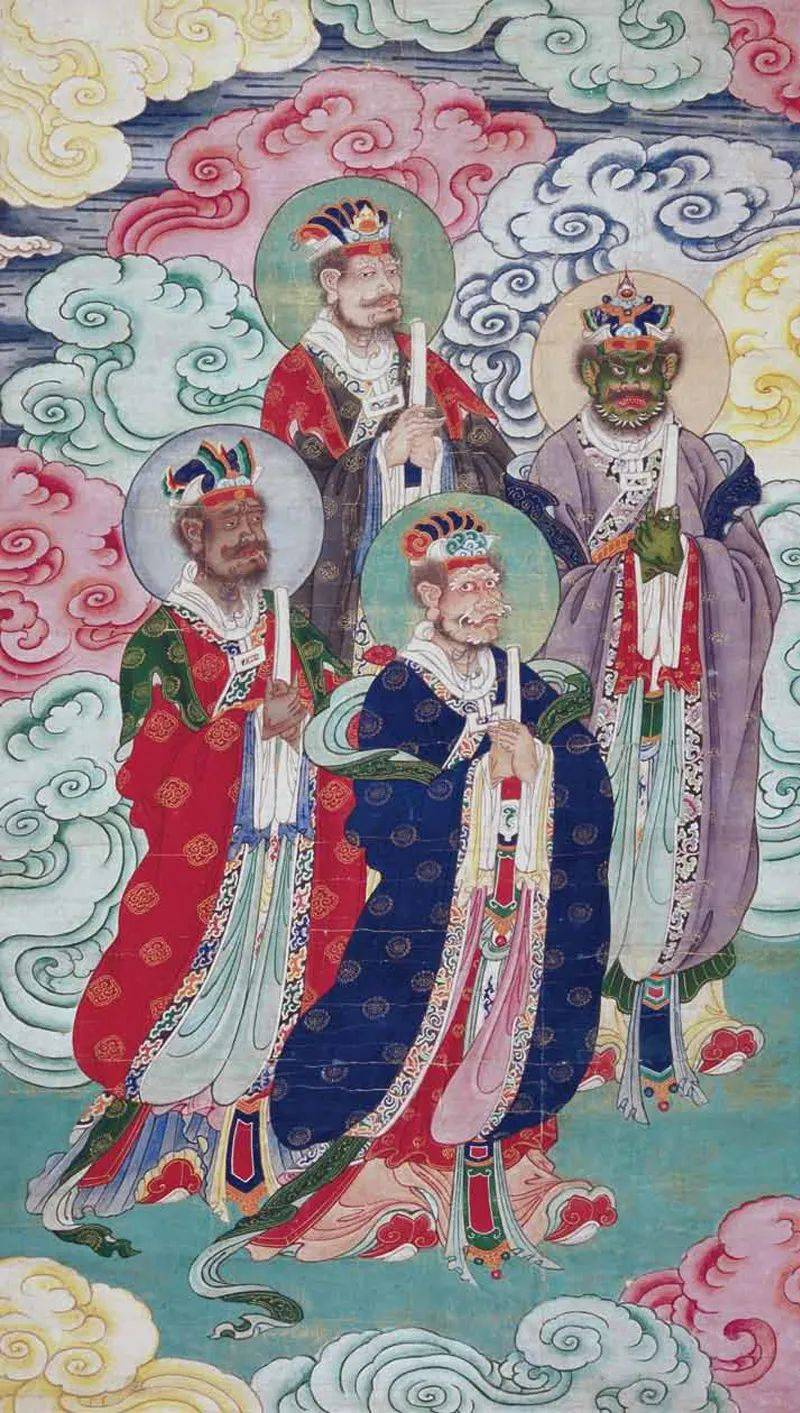
Four Dragon Kings, Qing dynasty.

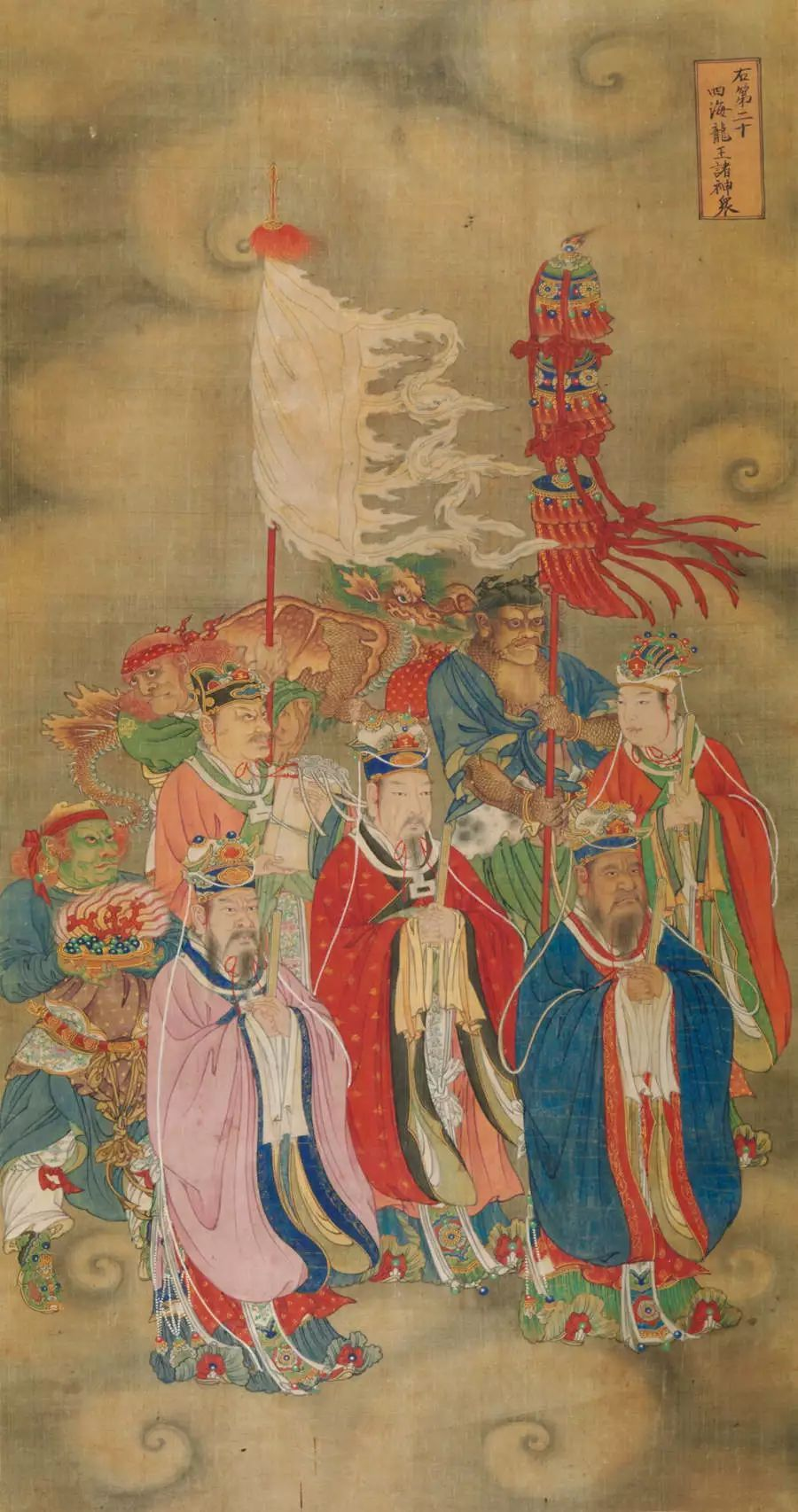
Ming Dynasty Shuilu ritual painting from Baoning Temple in Shanxi, China.

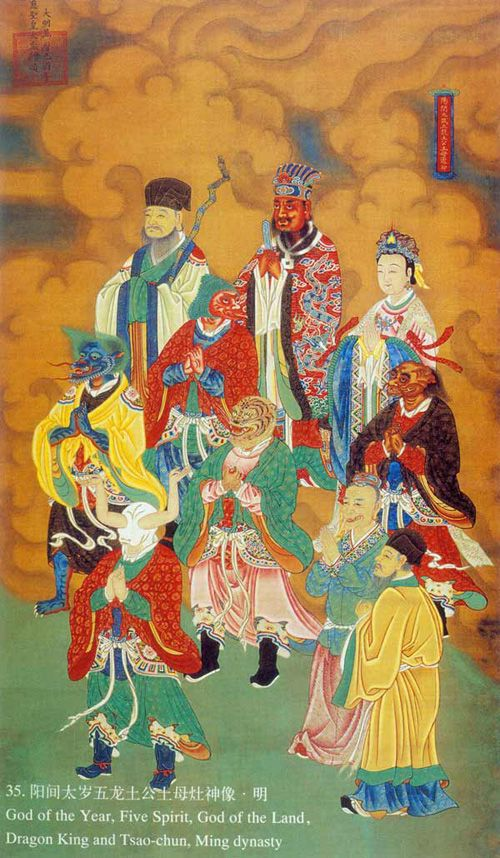
Yangjian taisui Wulong Tugong Tumu Zaoshen xiang (Ming dynasty, 1609AD) (Note: The title gives wulong or five dragons, but the figure with a pair of hands growing out of eye socket is Yangjian taisui aka Yang Yin (Investiture of the Gods), and the other figures are the azure dragon, tiger, and vermillion bird from the Four Symbols.) —Held by the Capital Museum

Dragons of the Five Regions/Directions existed in Chinese custom, established by the Former Han period(200BCE) (Cf. §Origins below). The same concept couched in "dragon king" (longwang) terminology from "dragon" was centuries later, the term "dragon king" being imported from India (Sanskrit naga-raja), vis Buddhism, introduced during the 1st century CE the Later Han.

The five "Dragon Kings" which were correlated with the Five Colors and Five Directions are attested uniquely in one work among Buddhist scriptures (sūtra), called the Foshuo guanding jing (佛說灌頂經; "Consecration Sūtra Expounded by the Buddha") early 4th century. (Note: Unique, as far as Monta is aware. It gives the names of the dragon kings of the five colors and five directions.) Attributed to Po-Srimitra, it is a pretended translation, or "apocryphal sutra" (post-canonical text), but its influence on later rituals (relating to entombment) is not dismissable.

The dragon king cult was most active around the Sui-Tang dynasty, according to one scholar, but another observes that the cult spread farther afield with the backing of Song dynasty monarchs who built Dragon King Temples (or rather Taoist shrines), and Emperor Huizong of Song (12th century) conferred investiture upon them as local kings. But the dragon king and other spell incantations came to be discouraged in Buddhism within China, because they were based on eclectic (apocryphal) sutras and the emphasis grew for the orthodox sutras, or put another way, the quinary system (based on number 5) was being superseded by the number 8 or number 12 being held more sacred.

During the Tang period, the dragon kings were also regarded as guardians that safeguard homes and pacify tombs, in conjunction with the worship of Lord Earth. (Note: Anzhai shenzhou jing ("Sūtra of the divine formula for pacifying a house"). The spell invokes the white and black dragon kings, and three by name, but the names don't really match those given by the Foshuo guanding jing.) Buddhist rainmaking rituals were also learned during Tang dynasty China.

The concept was transmitted to Japan alongside Vajrayana Buddhism, (Note: Cf. Tradition that emphasizes esoteric practices and rituals aimed at rapid spiritual awakening.) and also practiced as rites in Onmyōdō during the Heian Period.

=== Five dragons ===
(Origins)

The idea of associating the five directions/regions (五方; wufang) with the five colors is found in Confucian classic text, (Note: Rites of Zhou, "Chapter 6: Office of Winter" (2nd centudry BC).)

The Huainanzi (2nd cent. BC) describes the five colored dragons (azure/green, red, white, black, yellow) and their associations (Chapter 4: Terrestrial Forms), as well as the placement of sacred beasts in the five directions (the Four Symbols beasts, dragon, tiger, bird, tortoise in the four cardinal directions and the yellow dragon.

And the Luxuriant Dew of the Spring and Autumn Annals attributed to Dong Zhongshu (2nd cent. BC) describes the ritual involving five colored dragons.

=== Attestations of Five Dragon Kings ===
==== Consecration Sutra ====
The apocryphal 佛說灌頂經; Foshuo guanding jing; "Consecration Sūtra Expounded by the Buddha" (early 4th century, attributed to Po-Srimitra 帛尸梨蜜多羅), which purports to be Buddhist teachings but in fact incorporates elements of Chinese traditional belief, (Note: Yamaguchi, citing the Daizōkyō zenkaisetsu daijiten: "[『仏説灌頂経』は]仏典ではあるが、 「中国の俗信仰的要素が認められる」（雄山閣『大蔵経全解説大事典』）".) associates five dragon kings with five colored dragons with five directions, as aforementioned.

The text gives the personal names of the kings. To the east is the Blue Dragon Spirit King (青龍神王) named Āxiūhē (阿修訶; 阿脩訶), with 49 dragon kings under him, with 70 myriad myllion lesser dragons, mountain spirits, and assorted 魅; mei demons as minions. The thrust of this scripture is that in everywhere in every direction, there are the minions causing poisonings and ailments, and their lord the dragon kings must be beseeched in prayer to bring relief. In the south is the Red Dragon Spirit King named Nàtóuhuàtí (那頭化提), in the west the White, called Hēlóusàchātí (訶樓薩叉提; 訶樓薩扠提), in the north the Black, called Nàyètílóu (那業提婁) and at center the Yellow, called Dūlúobōtí (闍羅波提), with different numbers subordinate dragon kings, with minion hordes of lesser dragons and other beings.

Though connection of poison to rainmaking may not be obvious, it has been suggested that this poison-banishing sutra could have viably been read as a replacement in the execution of the ritual to pray for rain (shōugyōhō, 請雨経法), in Japan. A medieval commentary (Ryūō-kōshiki, copied 1310) has reasoned that since the Great Peacock (Mahāmāyūrī) sūtra mandates one to chant dragon names in order to detoxify, so shall offerings made to dragon lead to "sweet rain".

==== Divine Incantations Scripture ====
The wangfang ("five position") dragon kings are also attested in the Taishang dongyuan shenzhou jing (太上洞淵神咒經; "Most High Cavernous Abyss Divine Spells Scripture"), (Note: Or "The Most High Dongyuan Scripture of Divine Spells") though not explicitly under the collective name of "five position dragon kings", but individually as "Eastern Direction's Blue Emperor Blue Dragon King (東方青帝青龍王)", and so forth. It gives a laundry list of dragon kings by different names, stating that spells to cause rain can be performed by invoking dragon kings.

=== Ritual process ===
An ancient procedural instruction for invoking five-colored dragons to conduct rainmaking rites occurs in the Luxuriant Dew of the Spring and Autumn Annals, under its "Seeking Rain" chapter (originally 2nd century B.C.). It prescribes earthenware figurines of greater and lesser dragons of a specific color according to season, namely blue-green, red, yellow, white, black, depending on whether it was spring, summer, late summer (jìxià), autumn, or winter. And these figures were to be placed upon the altar at the assigned position/direction (east, south, center, west, or north). (Note: "... that is to say, canglong [blue-green dragon] to the east in spring, the red dragon to the south in summer, the yellow dragon to the center in late summer (jìxià), white dragon to the west in autumn, and black dragon to the north in winter ..すなわち、春は蒼龍を東に、夏は赤龍を南に、季夏は黄龍を中央に、秋は白龍を西に、冬は黒龍を北にそれぞれ配置するとされている".)

This Chinese folk rain ritual later became incorporated into Daoism. The rituals were codified into Daoist scripture or Buddhist sūtras in the post-Later Han (Six Dynasties) period, but Dragon King worship did not come into ascendancy until the Sui-Tang dynasties. The rain rituals in Esoteric Buddhism in the Tang dynasty was actually an adaptation of indigenous Chinese dragon worship and rainmaking beliefs, rather than pure Buddhism.

As a point of illustration, a comparison can be made against Buddhist procedures for rainmaking during the Tang dynasty. The rainmaking tract in Atikūṭa 阿地瞿多's translated Collected Dhāraṇī Sūtras, (Book 11, under the chapter for 祈雨壇法; qíyǔ tánfǎ; "Rain Prayer Altar Method") prescribes an altar to be built, with mud figures of dragon kings placed on the four sides, and numerous mud-made lesser dragons arranged within and without the altar. (Note: Raiyu's edited work Hishō mondō 秘鈔問答 quotes from this sutra: "As the Collected Dhāraṇī Sūtras, 11 states, this altar should have a single-walled and four-gated boundary be made around its field. And on the East gate of the altar, the gate officer should be crafted out of mud, in the embodiment of the dragon king 其壇界畔作一重而開四門。壇之東門将以泥土作、龍王身".)

== Dragon Kings of the Four Seas ==
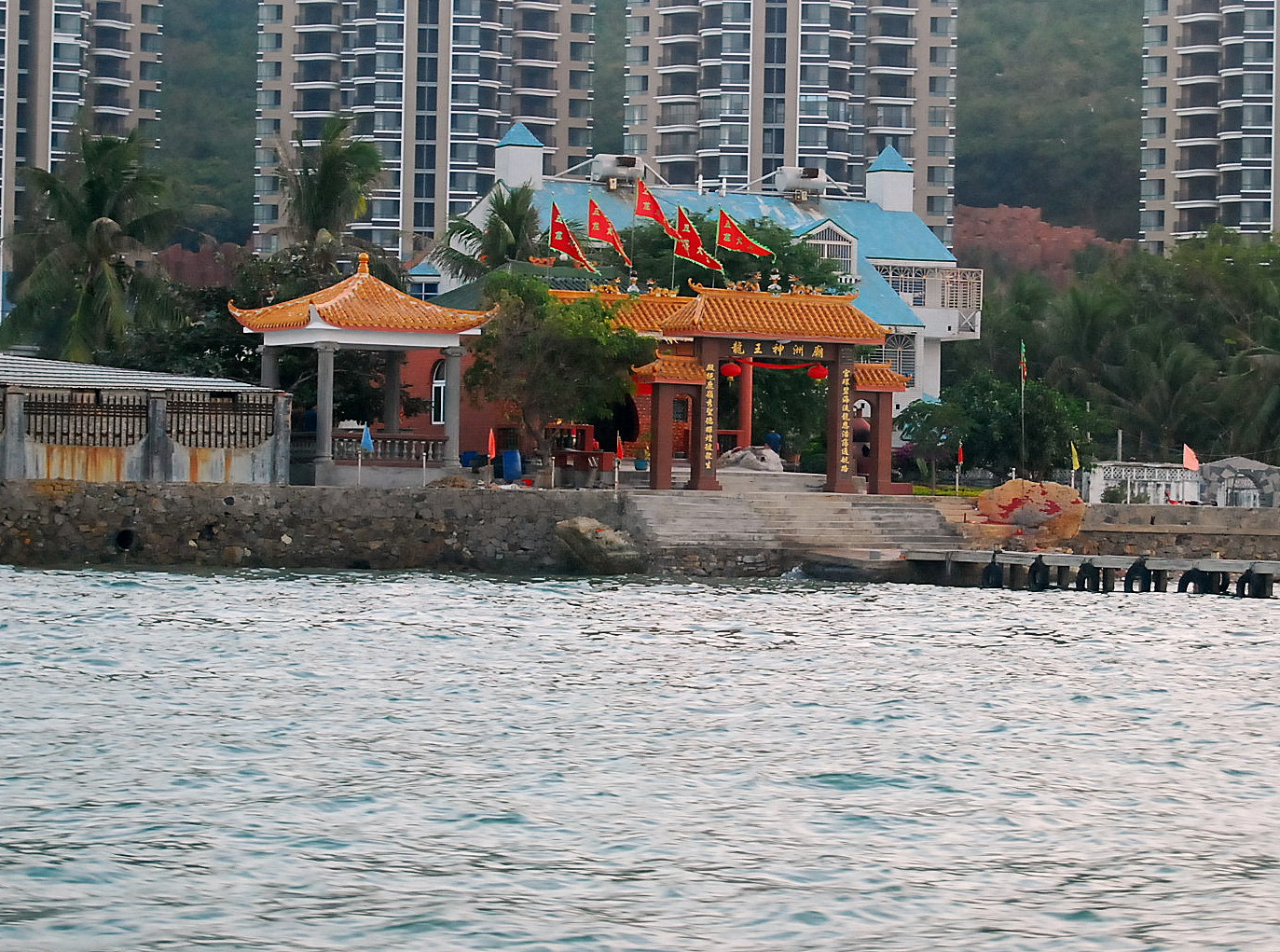
Temple of the Dragon King of the South Sea in Sanya, Hainan.

Each one of the four Dragon Kings of the Four Seas (四海龍王; Sìhǎi Lóngwáng) is associated with a body of water corresponding to one of the four cardinal directions and natural boundaries of China: the East Sea (corresponding to the East China Sea also, parts of the Pacific), the South Sea (corresponding to the South China Sea, West Philippines Sea), the West Sea (The Qinghai Lake sometimes also, Indian Ocean, Bay of Bengal and beyond), and the North Sea (Lake Baikal, Sea of Japan, and also the Arctic Ocean).

They appear in the classical novels like The Investiture of the Gods and Journey to the West. In Ramayana, the Ocean King Varuna (Ao-Run) assists Rama to create the Ram-setu.

In Fengshen Yanyi and Journey to the West where each of them has a proper name, and they share the surname Ao (敖, meaning "playing" or "proud"). The origin of their family name, Ao (敖), however, remains unclear. The names of the Dragon Kings also vary according to the stories they are featured in.

=== Dragon of the Eastern Sea ===
His proper name is Ao Guang (敖廣 or 敖光), and he is the patron of the East China Sea. He is often directly associated as the Dragon King Sagara.

=== Dragon of the Western Sea ===
His proper names are Ao Run (敖閏), Ao Jun (敖君) or Aó Jí (敖吉). He is the patron of Qinghai Lake, sometimes also the Indian Ocean, Bay of Bengal and beyond. The Hindu sea god Varuna is often associated with him due to historical relations between Chinese and Indian religions.

=== Dragon of the Southern Sea ===
He is the patron of the South China Sea, West Philippine Sea and his proper name is Ao Qin (敖欽).

=== Dragon of the Northern Sea ===
His proper names are Ao Shun (敖順) or Ao Ming (敖明), and his body of water is Lake Baikal, Sea of Japan sometimes also, the Arctic Ocean.

== Worship of the Dragon God ==
Worship of the Dragon God is celebrated throughout China with sacrifices and processions during the fifth and sixth moons, and especially on the date of his birthday the thirteenth day of the sixth moon. A folk religious movement of associations of good-doing in modern Hebei is primarily devoted to a generic Dragon God whose icon is a tablet with his name inscribed on it, utilized in a ritual known as the "movement of the Dragon Tablet". The Dragon God is traditionally venerated with dragon boat racing.

In coastal regions of China, Korea, Vietnam, traditional legends and worshipping of whales (whale gods) have been referred to Dragon Kings after the arrival of Buddhism.

== Buddhism ==
"There were eight dragon kings, the dragon king Nanda, the dragon king Upananda, the dragon king Sagara, the dragon king Vasuki, the dragon king Takshaka, the dragon king Anavatapta, the dragon king Manasvin, the dragon king Utpalaka, each with several hundreds of thousands of followers." - Dragon King Sutra

In chapter 12 of the Lotus Sutra (Devadatta), The eight-year-old daughter (Longnü) of the dragon king Sagara (Ao-Guang) attained Enlightenment after offering a jewel to Buddha Sakyamuni, hearing Bodhisattva Manjushri and Avalokiteśvara (Bodhisattva Guanyin) preach the sutra in place of her father. In the Budhhist folk tale Complete Tale of Avalokiteśvara and the Southern Seas, the third son of the Dragon king was accidentally captured by a fisherman and later saved by Bodhisattva Avalokiteśvara. To show her gratitude for saving her brother, Longnü offers the "Pearl of light" to Avalokiteśvara and became a disciple of him and soon later Longnü attained Niravana.

Tibetan Buddhism, the nāgas are the followers of Virūpākṣa (Pāli: Virūpakkha), one of the Four Heavenly Kings who guards the western direction. They act as guards upon Mount Sumeru, protecting the dēvas of Trāyastriṃśa from attacks by the asuras. (Main article Nāgaraja, Virūpākṣa)

Apalāla (Pali, Sanskrit) is a water-dwelling Nāga-king in Buddhist mythology. The story of conversion to Buddhism by the Buddha (Pali: Apalāladamana) can be found in Buddhist texts such as Samantapāsādikā and Divyāvadāna.

Some Buddhist traditions describe a figure named Duo-luo-shi-qi, or Talasikhin, as a Dragon King who resides in a palace located in a pond near the legendary kingdom of Ketumati. It is said that at midnight, he would drizzle in this pond to cleanse himself of dust.

Buddhist literature features a Nāga King named Dhṛtarāṣṭra (Sanskrit; Pali: Dhataraṭṭha), who is one of the four Heavenly kings, guarding the east. He was the father of Gautama Buddha in a past life when Budhha was bodhisattva named Bhūridatta. He is mentioned in Buddhist texts Bhūridatta Jātaka, the Mahamayuri Vidyarajni Sutra and the Mahāmegha Sūtra.

== Artistic depictions ==
Longwang in art

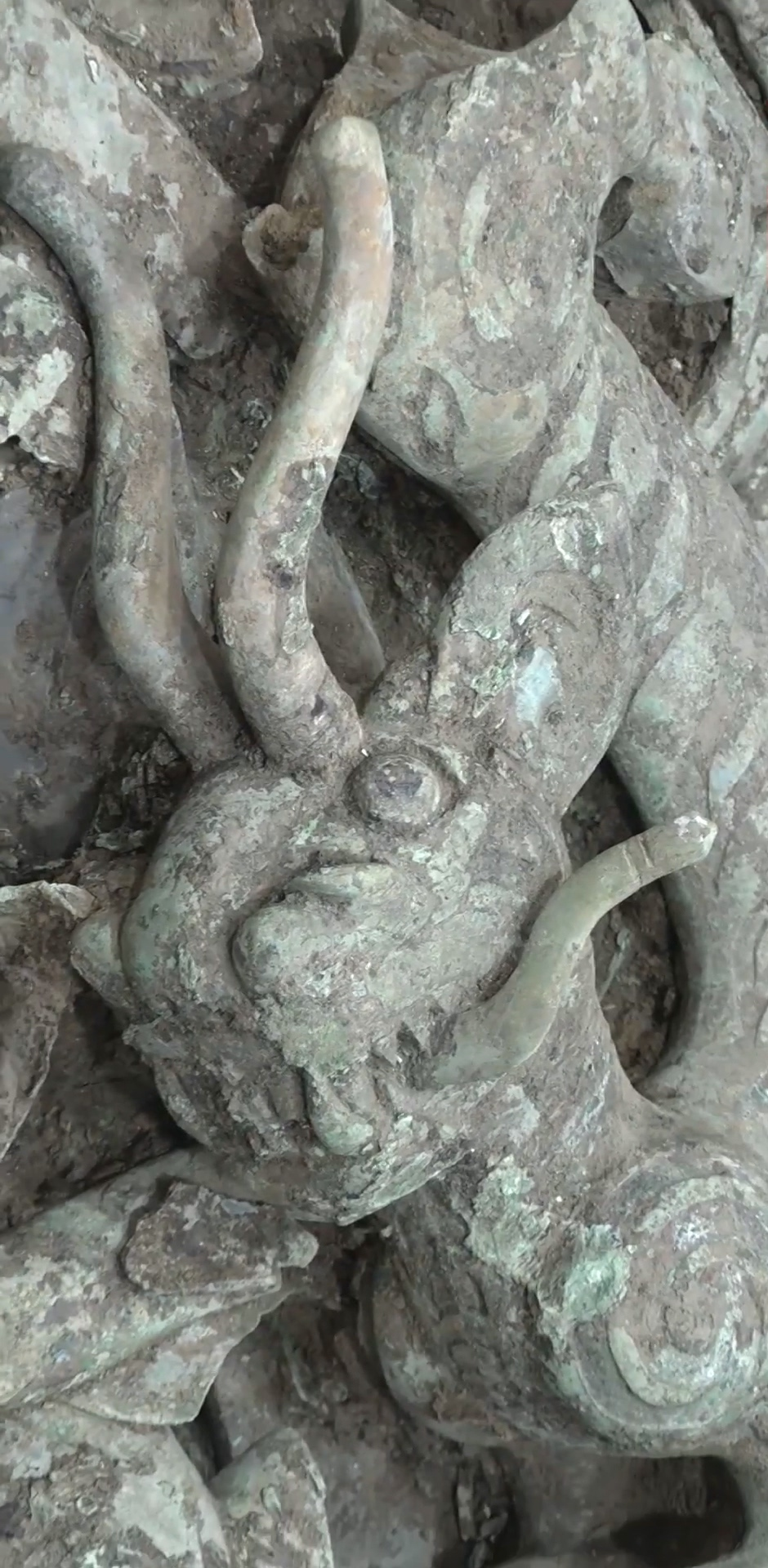
Bronze dragon from Sanxingdui, Shang dynasty, China. 1000 BCE

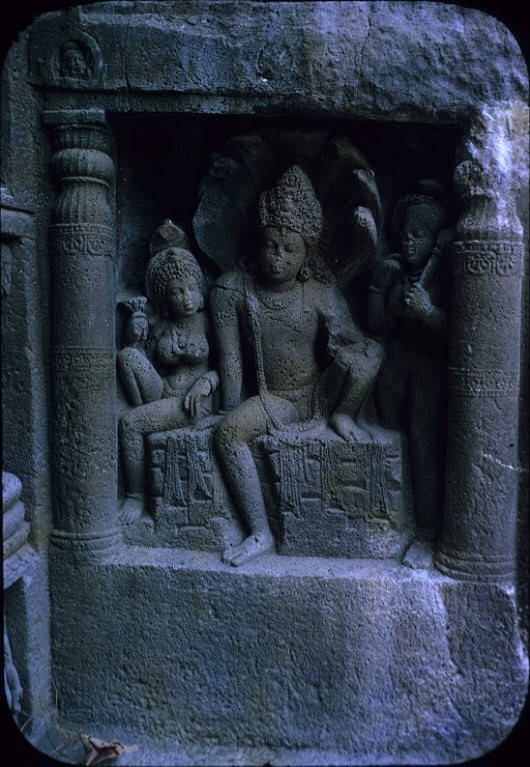
High relief sculpture of Naga couple, from Ajanta Cave #19, Maharashtra, India. 500–1000 BCE

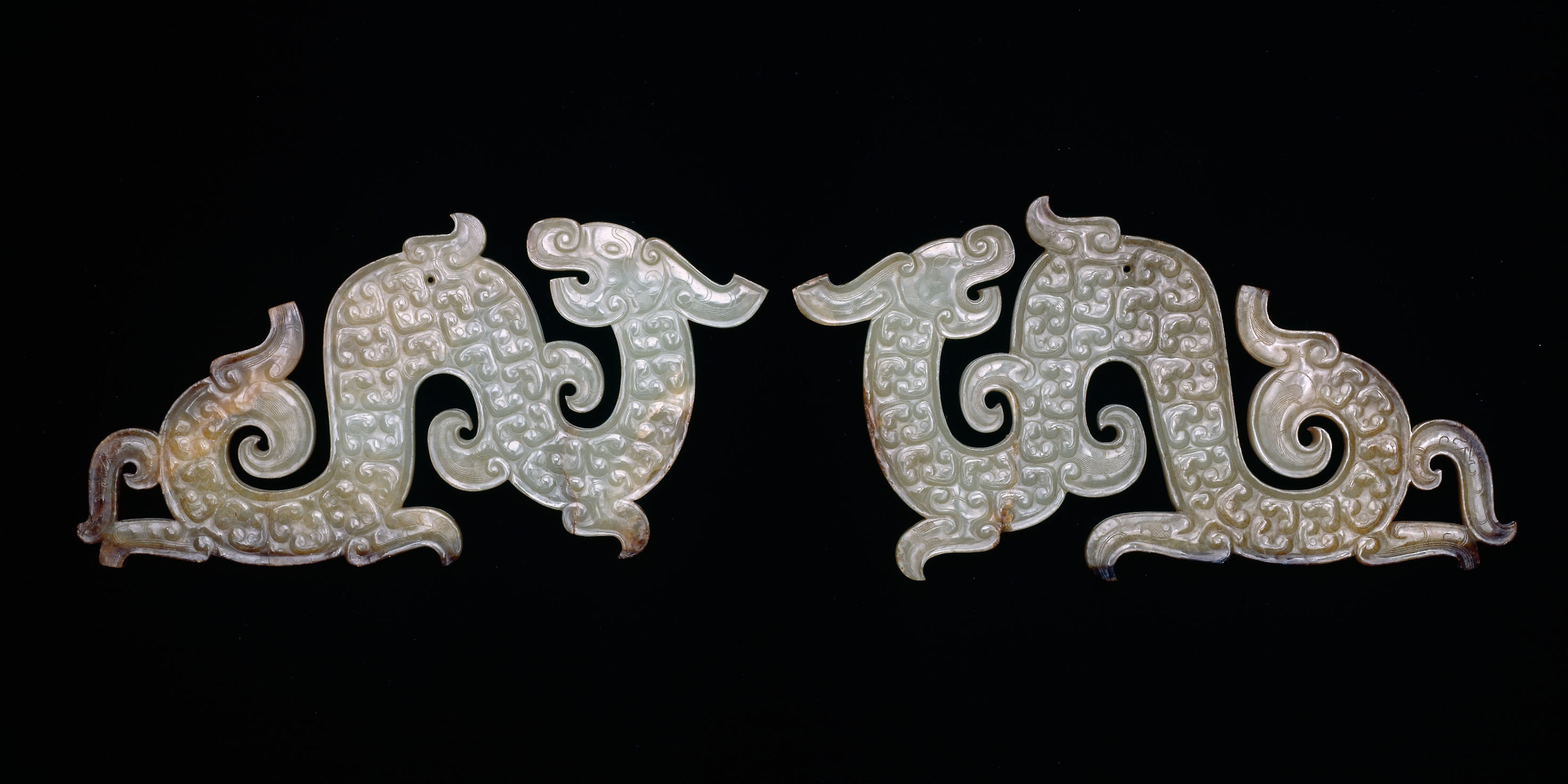
Jade dragon pendants, Zhou dynasty, China. 200–1000 BCE

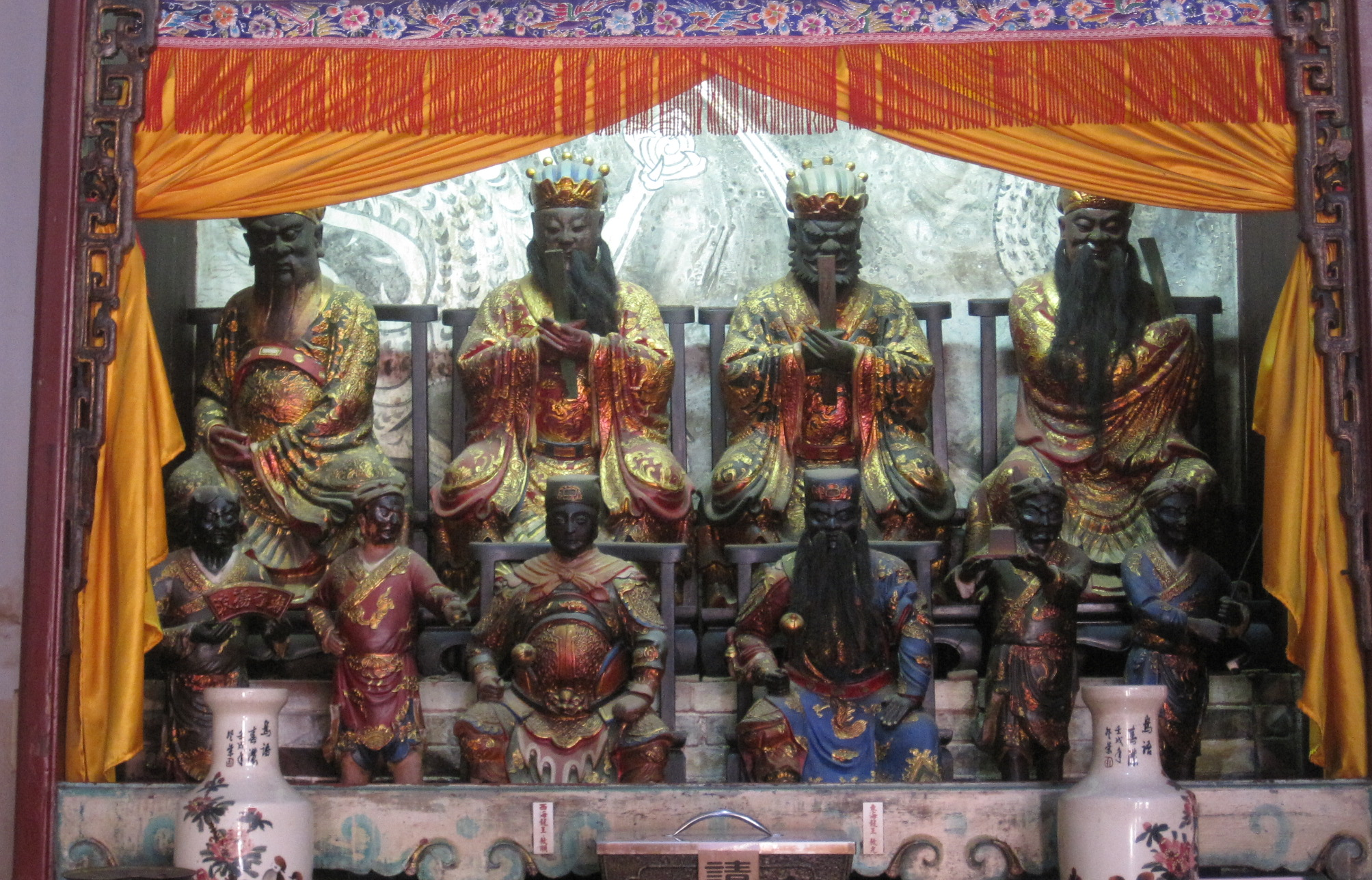
The Dragon Kings of the Four Seas at the Grand Matsu Temple in Tainan.

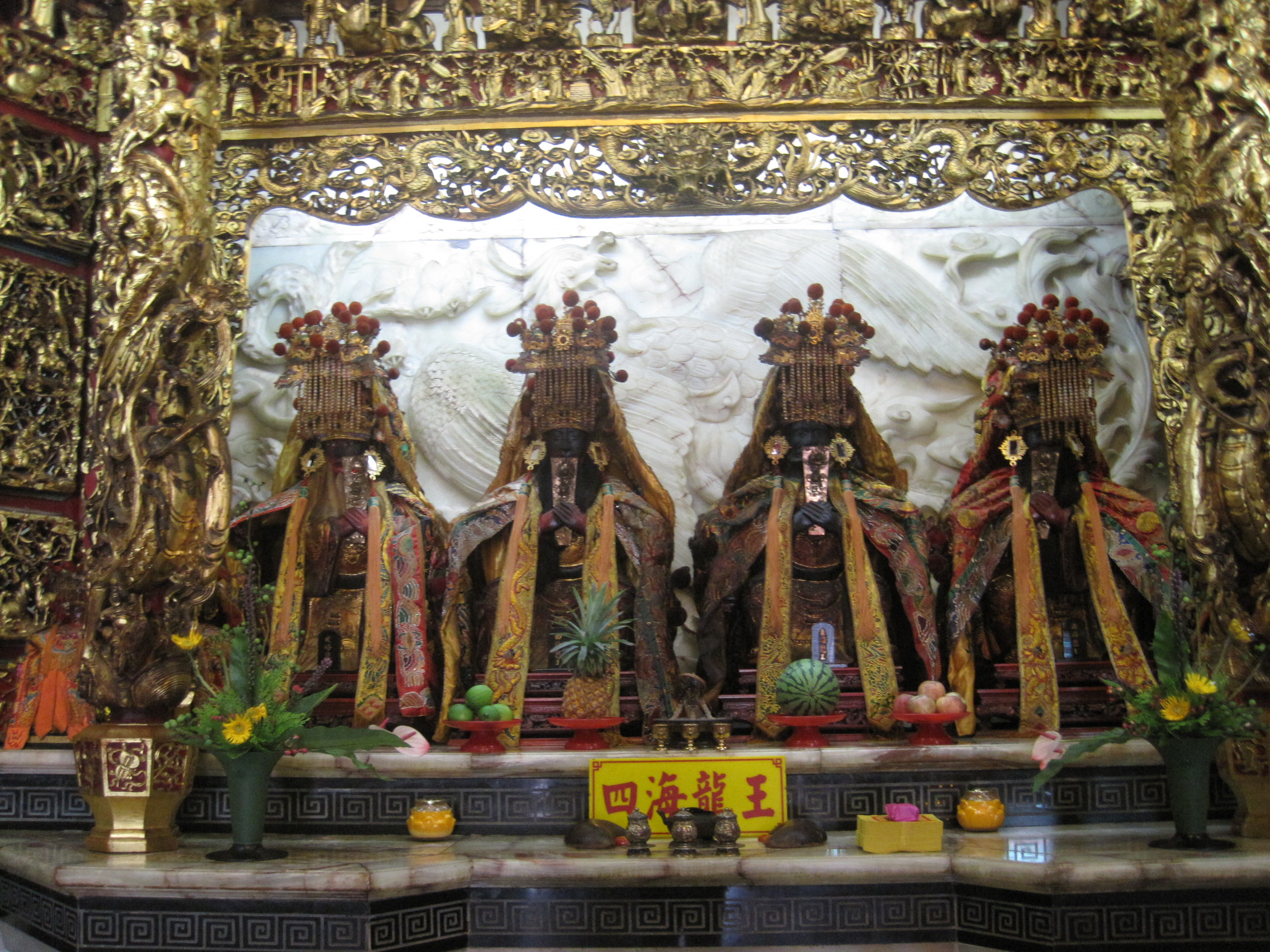
The four Dragon Kings at the Temple of Mazu in Anping, Tainan.

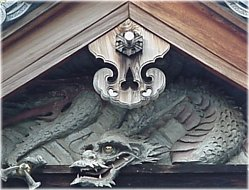
Dragon at Ryūtaku-ji Temple structure, Japan.

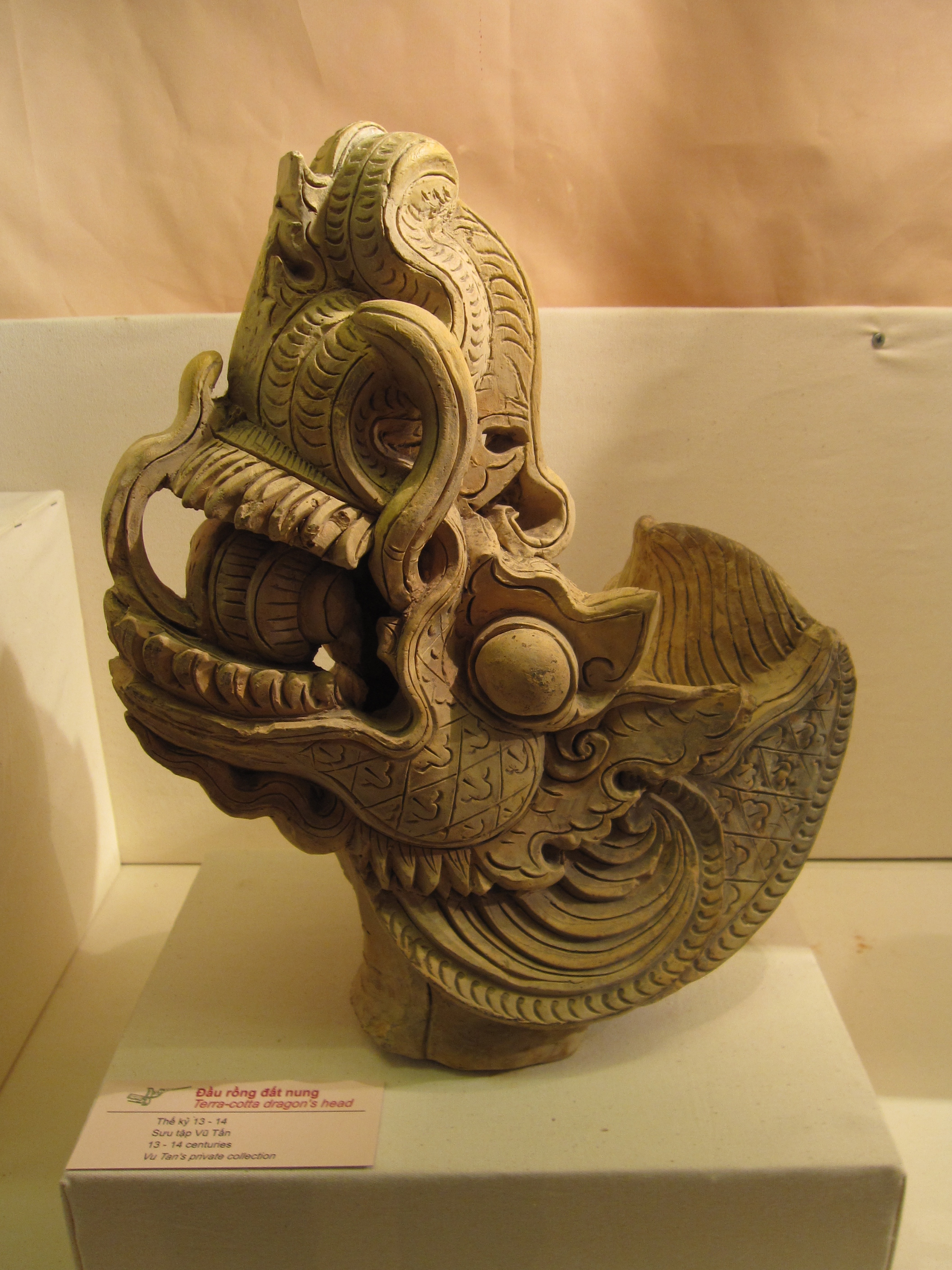
A Lý dynasty terracotta dragon's head, Vietnam.

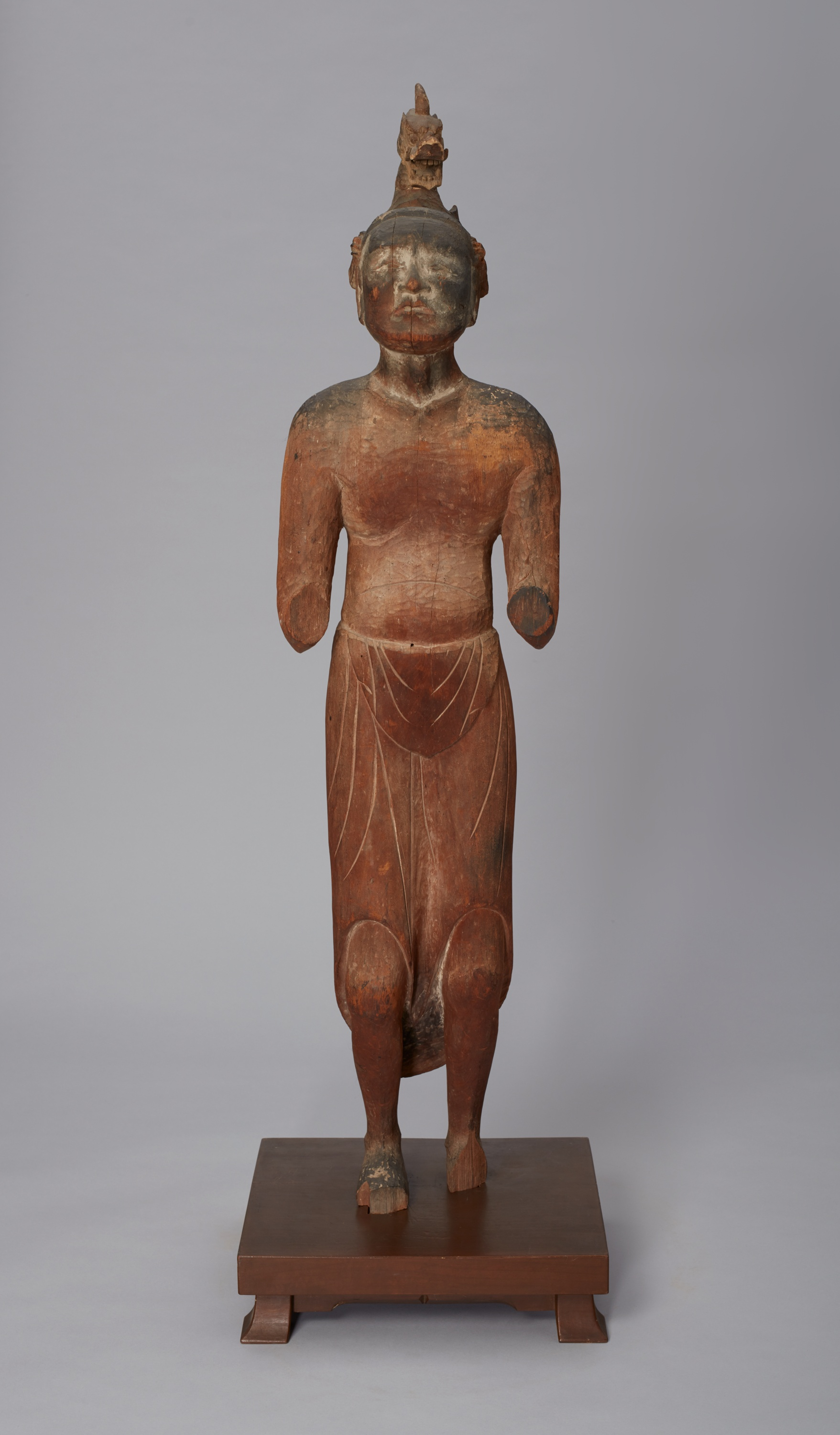
A wooden sculpture of a Dragon King from Japan's Izumo district, it is believed to belong to a group of more than twenty Shinto deities (Kami).

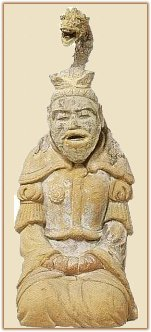
Ryū-ō 竜王 (Dragon King) Sanskrit = Naga-Raja, 7th Century, Hōryū-ji Temple, Japan.

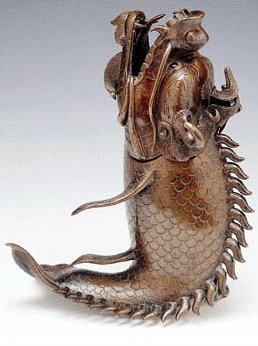
Censer of leaping carp transforming into dragon. Unknown artist. China 17th century, Ming Dynasty, Phoenix Art Museum.

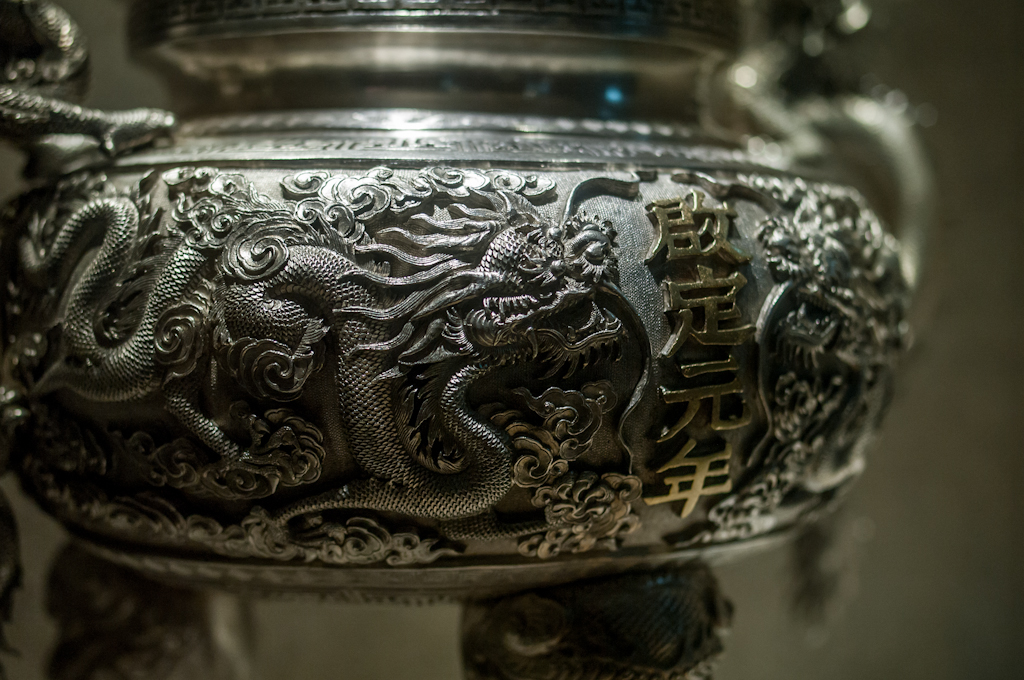
Nguyễn dynasty bronze incense burner, Vietnam.

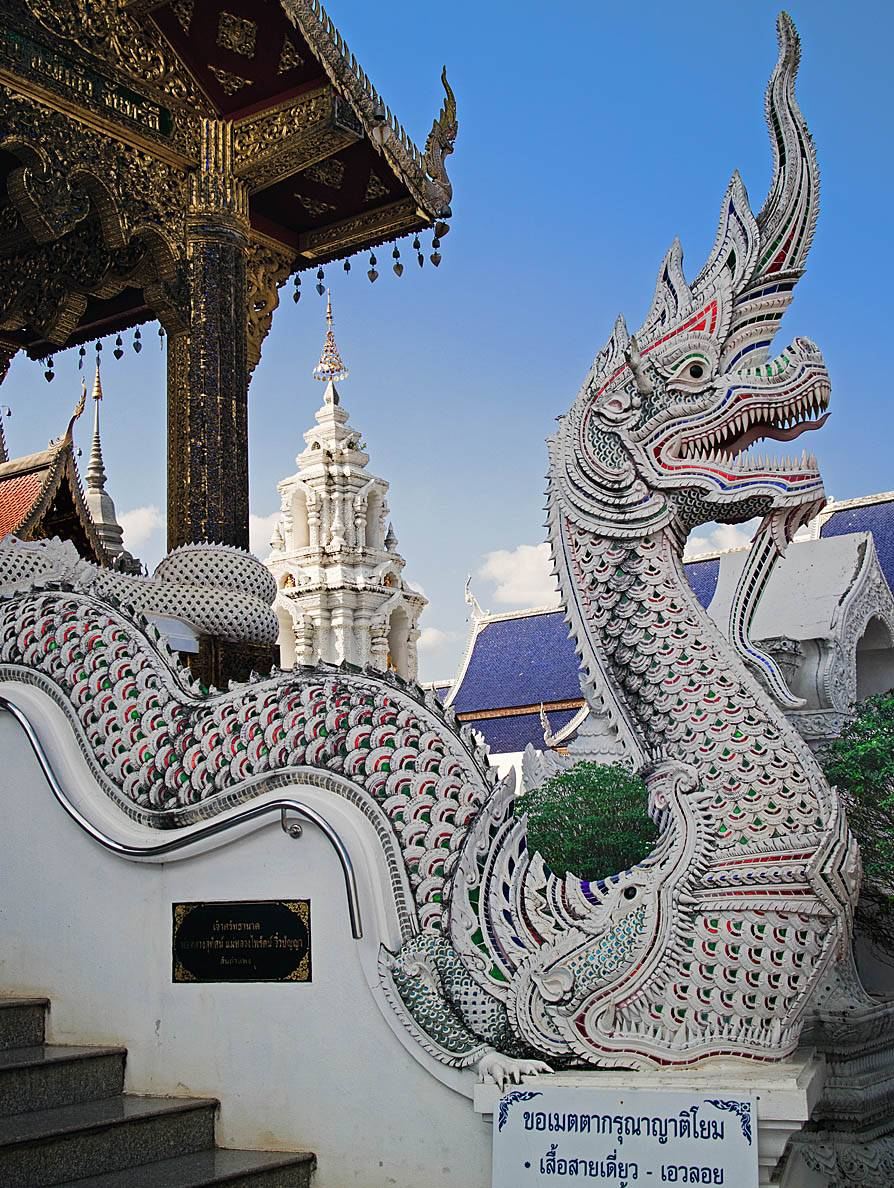
A naga at Wat Baan Den near Chiang Mai, Thailand.

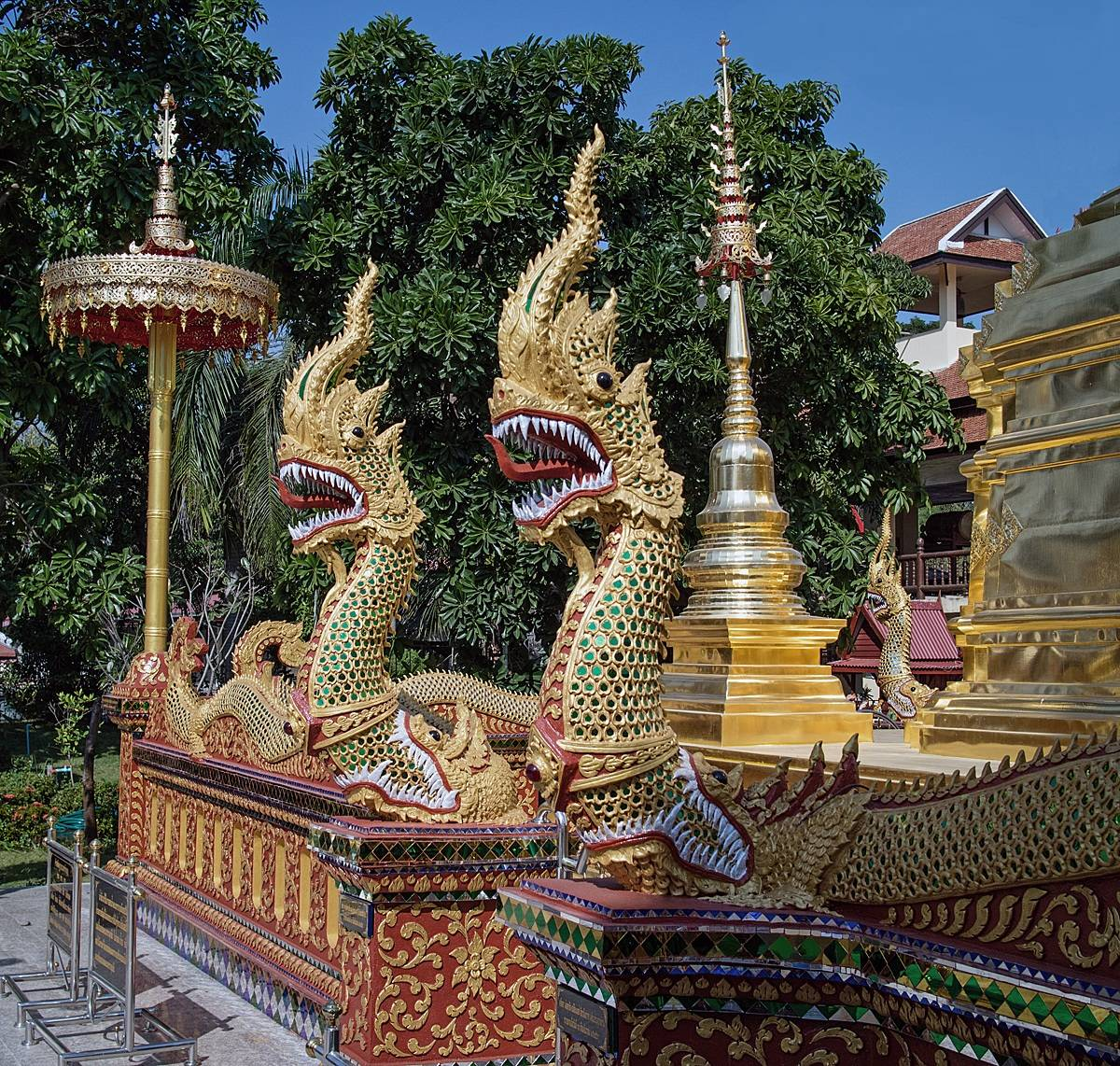
Nagas guarding a Buddhist stupa to ward off evil spirits, Thailand.

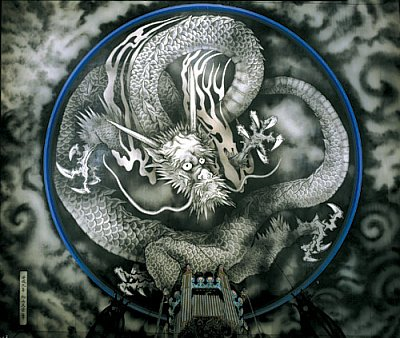
Dragon, Ceiling Painting at Tenryū-ji Temple, Kyoto, Japan. Rinzai Zen Sect. (Upcoming) Dragon temple structures in Japan. Dragon at Ryūtaku-ji Temple.

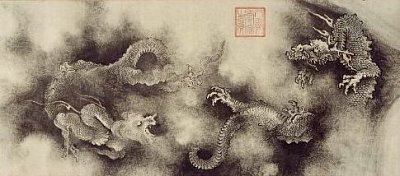
Nine Dragons Hand Scroll (Detail) - 九龍圖卷 (陳容) Chinese, Southern Song dynasty, dated 1244, Chen Rong, Chinese, first half of the 13th century. Museum of Fine Arts, Boston.

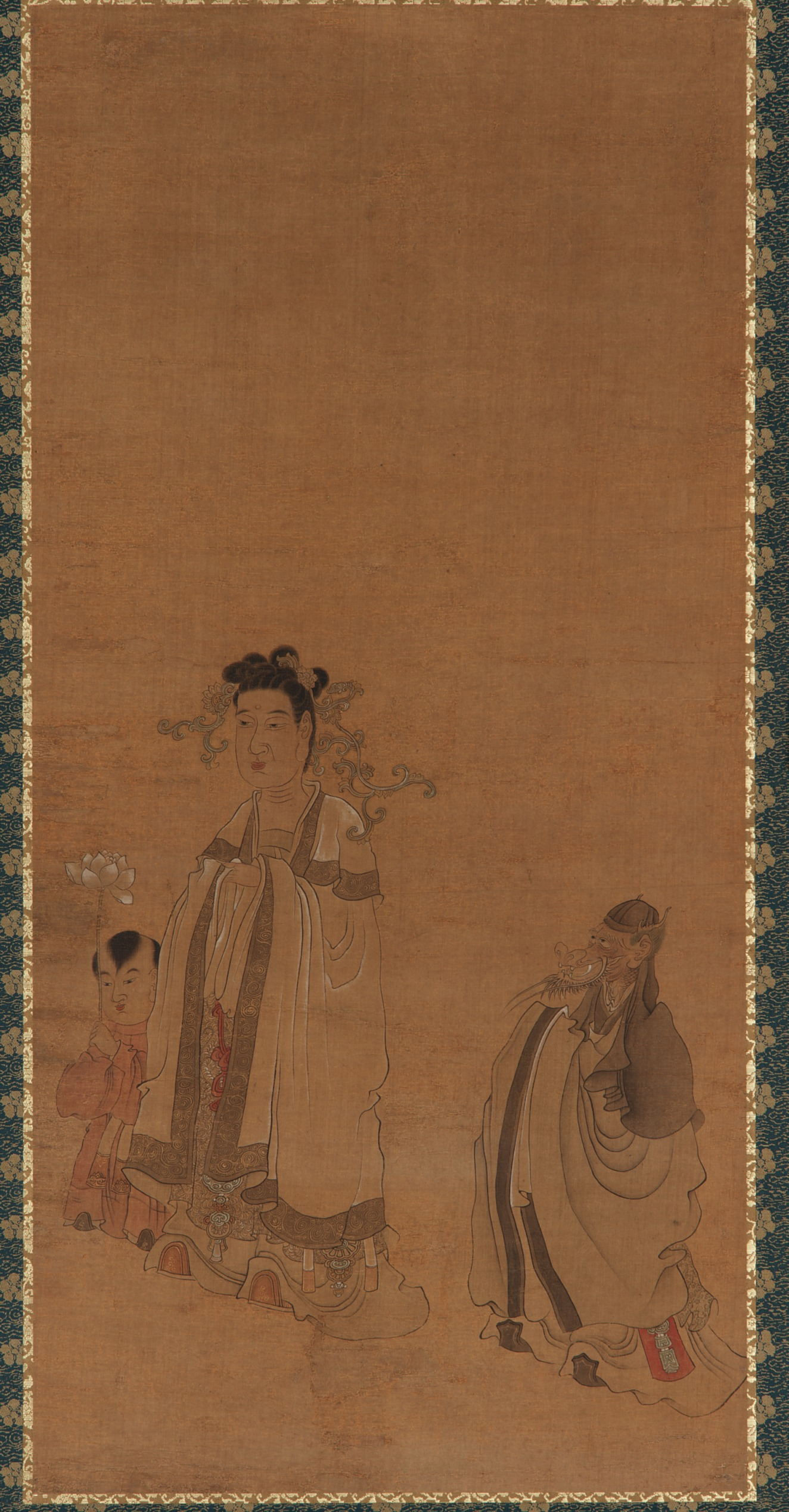
The Dragon King revering the Buddha, an ink painting from China (1368–1644).

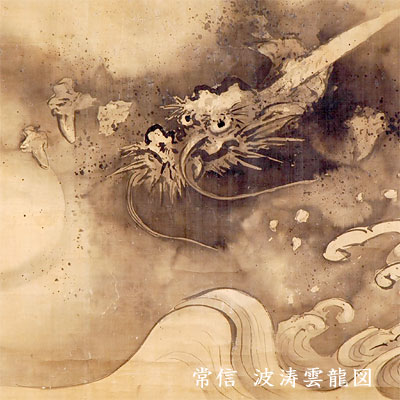
Dragon Painting by Kano Tsunenobu 狩野常信 (Kanou School), 16th - 17th Century.

== Japan ==
As already mentioned, Esoteric Buddhists in Japan who initially learned their trade from Tang dynasty China engaged in rainmaking ritual prayers invoking dragon kings under a system known as shōugyōhō or shōugyō [no] hō, established in the Shingon sect founded by the priest Kūkai, who learned Buddhism in Tang China. It was first performed by Kūkai in the year 824 at Shinsen'en, according to legend, but the first occasion probably took place historically in the year 875, then a second time in 891. The rain ritual came to be performed regularly.

The shōugyōhō ritual used two mandalas that featured dragon kings. The Great Mandala that was hung up was of a design that centered around Sakyamuni Buddha, surrounded by the Eight Great Dragon Kings, the ten thousand dragon kings, Bodhisattvas (based on the 大雲輪請雨經; Dayunlun qingyu jing, "Scripture of [Summoning] Great Clouds and Petitioning for Rain"). The other one was a "spread-out mandala" (shiki mandara 敷曼荼羅) laid flat out on its back, and depicted five dragon kings, which were one-, three-, five-, seven-, and nine-headed (based on the Collected Dhāraṇī Sūtras).

Also, there was the "Five Dragons Festival/ritual" (Goryūsai 五龍祭) that was performed by onmyōji or yin-yang masters. The oldest mention of this in literature is from Fusō Ryakuki, the entry of Engi 2/902AD, 17th day of the 6th moon. Sometimes, the performance of the rain ritual by Esoteric Buddhists (shōugyōhō) would be followed in succession by the Five Dragons Ritual from the Yin-Yang Bureau. The Five Dragon rites performed by the onmyōji or yin yang masters had their heyday around the 10–11th centuries. There are mokkan, or inscribed wooden tablets, used in these rites that have been unearthed (e.g., from an 8–10th century site and a 9th-century site).

In Japan, there also developed a legend that the primordial being Banko (Pangu of Chinese myth) sired the Five Dragon Kings, who were invoked in the ritual texts or saimon read in Shinto or Onmyōdō rites, but the five beings later began to be seen less as monsters and more as wise princes.

== Dragon Kings of Bhutan ==
Also the Kings of Bhutan are called the Dragon King as Bhutan in its native language is known as Drukyul which translates as "The Land of Dragon". Thus, while kings of Bhutan are known as Druk Gyalpo meaning Dragon King (Bhutan), the Bhutanese people call themselves the Drukpa, meaning "people of Druk (Bhutan)". Present King Jigme Khesar Namgyel Wangchuck is the 5th Dragon King.

== See also ==
- Chinese dragon
- Dragon king theory
- Lạc Long Quân
- Nagaraja
- Nāga
- Prince Nezha's Triumph Against Dragon King
- Shenlong (神龍)
- Tianlong (天龍)
- Typhoon Longwang
- Watatsumi
- Ryūjin
- Wǔfāng Shàngdì - "Highest Deities of the Five Regions"
- Yinglong
