= Pa Pae =

Pa Pae may refer to:

- Pa Pae, Mae Sariang
- Pa Pae, Mae Taeng
