= Mueang Kai =

Mueang Kai เมืองก๋าย
- Tambon
- Interactive map of Mueang Kai
- Coordinates: 19°10′34″N 98°48′33″E
- Country: Thailand
- Province: Chiang Mai
- Amphoe: Mae Taeng

Population (2020)
  - Total: 1,694
- Time zone: UTC+7 (TST)
- Postal code: 50150
- TIS 1099: 500610

Mueang Kai (Thai: เมืองก๋าย) is a tambon (subdistrict) of Mae Taeng District, in Chiang Mai Province, Thailand. In 2020 it had a total population of 1,694 people.

== History ==
The subdistrict was created effective August 27, 1976 by splitting off 4 administrative villages from Sop Poeng.

== Administration ==
=== Central administration ===
The tambon is subdivided into 5 administrative villages (muban).

No.	Name	Thai
1.	Ban Kai Noi	บ้านก๋ายน้อย
2.	Ban Mueang Kai	บ้านเมืองก๋าย
3.	Ban Op	บ้านออบ
4.	Ban Lao	บ้านเหล่า
5.	Ban Mon Ngae	บ้านม่อนเงาะ

=== Local administration ===
The whole area of the subdistrict is covered by the subdistrict administrative organization (SAO) Mueang Kai (องค์การบริหารส่วนตำบลเมืองก๋าย).
