= Khilek, Mae Taeng =

Coordinates: 19.0625°N 98.9396°E

Khilek ขี้เหล็ก
- Tambon
- Interactive map of Khilek
- Country: Thailand
- Province: Chiang Mai
- Amphoe: Mae Taeng

Population (2014)
  - Total: 9,334
- Time zone: UTC+7 (ICT)
- Postal code: 50150
- TIS 1099: 500603

Khilek (Thai: ขี้เหล็ก) is a tambon (sub-district) of Mae Taeng District, in Chiang Mai Province, Thailand. In 2014 it had a population of 9,334 people.

== Administration ==
=== Central administration ===
The tambon is divided into 11 administrative villages (muban).

No.	Name	Thai
1.	Ban Buak Mue	บ้านบวกหมื้อ
2.	Ban Mae Malai	บ้านแม่มาลัย
3.	Ban Dong Pa Lan	บ้านดงป่าลัน
4.	Ban Nong Khong	บ้านหนองโค้ง
5.	Ban Sai Mun	บ้านทรายมูล
6.	Ban Ram Poeng	บ้านร่ำเปิง
7.	Ban Mae Khachan	บ้านแม่ขะจาน
8.	Ban Pong Pao	บ้านปางเปา
9.	Ban Huai Rai	บ้านห้วยไร่
10.	Ban Thung Si Thong	บ้านทุ่งสีทอง
11.	Ban Pong Saeng Thong	บ้านปงแสงทอง

=== Local administration ===
The area of the sub-district is shared by two local governments.

- the sub-district municipality (thesaban tambon) San Maha Phon (เทศบาลตำบลสันมหาพน)
- the sub-district municipality Chom Chaeng (เทศบาลตำบลจอมแจ้ง)
