= San Pa Yang =

San Pa Yang สันป่ายาง
- Tambon
- Interactive map of San Pa Yang
- Country: Thailand
- Province: Chiang Mai
- Amphoe: Mae Taeng

Population (2005)
  - Total: 4,637
- Time zone: UTC+7 (ICT)

San Pa Yang (Thai: สันป่ายาง) is a tambon (sub-district) of Mae Taeng District, in Chiang Mai Province, Thailand. In 2005 it had a population of 4,637 people. The tambon contains five villages.
