= Ban Pao, Chiang Mai =

Ban Pao บ้านเป้า
- Tambon
- Interactive map of Ban Pao
- Country: Thailand
- Province: Chiang Mai
- Amphoe: Mae Taeng

Population (2020)
  - Total: 4,179
- Time zone: UTC+7 (TST)
- Postal code: 50150
- TIS 1099: 500607

Ban Pao (Thai: บ้านเป้า) is a tambon (subdistrict) of Mae Taeng District, in Chiang Mai Province, Thailand. In 2020, it had a total population of 4,179 people.

== Administration ==
=== Central administration ===
The tambon is subdivided into 7 administrative villages (muban).

No.	Name	Thai
1.	Ban Mae Cho	บ้านแม่โจ้
2.	Ban Mae Lim	บ้านแม่เลิม
3.	Ban Sop Lim	บ้านสบเลิม
4.	Ban Pao	บ้านเป้า
5.	Ban Phae	บ้านแพะ
6.	Ban Kang Hong	บ้านก๊างหงษ์
7.	Ban Dong	บ้านดง

=== Local administration ===
The whole area of the subdistrict is covered by the subdistrict administrative organization (SAO) Ban Pao (องค์การบริหารส่วนตำบลบ้านเป้า).
