= San Maha Phon =

Tambon in Chaing Mai, Thailand

San Maha Phon สันมหาพน
- Tambon
- Country: Thailand
- Province: Chiang Mai
- Amphoe: Mae Taeng

Population (2020)
  - Total: 6,425
- Time zone: UTC+7 (TST)
- Postal code: 50150
- TIS 1099: 500601

San Maha Phon (Thai: สันมหาพน) is a tambon (subdistrict) of Mae Taeng District, in Chiang Mai Province, Thailand. In 2020 it had a total population of 6,425 people.

== Administration ==
=== Central administration ===
The tambon is subdivided into 10 administrative villages (muban).

No.	Name	Thai
1.	Ban Pa Bong	บ้านป่าบง
2.	Ban Pa Sao	บ้านป่าเส้า
3.	Ban San Maha Phon	บ้านสันมหาพน
4.	Ban Pa Chi	บ้านป่าจี้
5.	Ban Nong Lom	บ้านหนองหล่ม
6.	Ban Nong Kok	บ้านหนองกอก
7.	Ban Pak Thang	บ้านปากทาง
8.	Ban Phae Phatthana	บ้านแพะพัฒนา
9.	Ban Sahakon	บ้านสหกรณ์
10.	Ban Huai Ang	บ้านฮ้วยอ๋าง

=== Local administration ===
The whole area of the subdistrict is covered by the subdistrict municipality (Thesaban Tambon) San Maha Phon (เทศบาลตำบลสันมหาพน).
