= Cho Lae =

Cho Lae ช่อแล
- Tambon
- Country: Thailand
- Province: Chiang Mai
- Amphoe: Mae Taeng

Population (2020)
  - Total: 4,330
- Time zone: UTC+7 (TST)
- Postal code: 50150
- TIS 1099: 500604

Cho Lae (Thai: ช่อแล) is a tambon (subdistrict) of Mae Taeng District, in Chiang Mai Province, Thailand. In 2020, it had a total population of 4,330 people.

== Administration ==
=== Central administration ===
The tambon is subdivided into 6 administrative villages (muban).

No.	Name	Thai
1.	Ban Cho Lae	บ้านช่อแล
2.	Ban San Pa Sak	บ้านสันป่าสัก
3.	Ban Wang Din	บ้านวังดิน
4.	Ban Pa Phai	บ้านป่าไผ่
5.	Ban Mai	บ้านใหม่
6.	Ban Nong Bua	บ้านหนองบัว

=== Local administration ===
The whole area of the subdistrict is covered by the town (Thesaban Mueang) Mueang Kaen Phatthana (เทศบาลเมืองเมืองแกนพัฒนา).
