= Kuet Chang =

Kuet Chang กื้ดช้าง
- Tambon
- Interactive map of Kuet Chang
- Coordinates: 19°16′N 98°46′E
- Country: Thailand
- Province: Chiang Mai
- Amphoe: Mae Taeng

Population (2020)
  - Total: 5,569
- Time zone: UTC+7 (TST)
- Postal code: 50150
- TIS 1099: 500612

Kuet Chang (Thai: กื้ดช้าง) is a tambon (subdistrict) of Mae Taeng District, in Chiang Mai Province, Thailand. In 2020 it had a total population of 5,569 people.

== Administration ==
=== Central administration ===
The tambon is subdivided into 8 administrative villages (muban).

| No. | Name | Thai |
|---|---|---|
| 1. | Ban Mueang Kuet | บ้านเมืองกื้ด |
| 2. | Ban Mae Taman | บ้านแม่ตะมาน |
| 3. | Ban Sop Kai | บ้านสบก๋าย |
| 4. | Ban Ton Kham | บ้านต้นขาม |
| 5. | Ban Huai Nam Dang | บ้านห้วยน้ำดัง |
| 6. | Ban Thung Lakhon | บ้านทุ่งละคร |
| 7. | Ban Pa Khao Lam | บ้านป่าข้าวหลาม |
| 8. | Ban Pa Pu Chom | บ้านผาปู่จอม |

=== Local administration ===
The whole area of the subdistrict is covered by the subdistrict administrative organization (SAO) Kuet Chang (องค์การบริหารส่วนตำบลกื้ดช้าง).
