= Wat Den Sali Si Mueang Kaen =

Thai Buddhist temple

Coordinates: 19.157512°N 98.978464°E

- วัดเด่นสะหลีศรีเมืองแกน
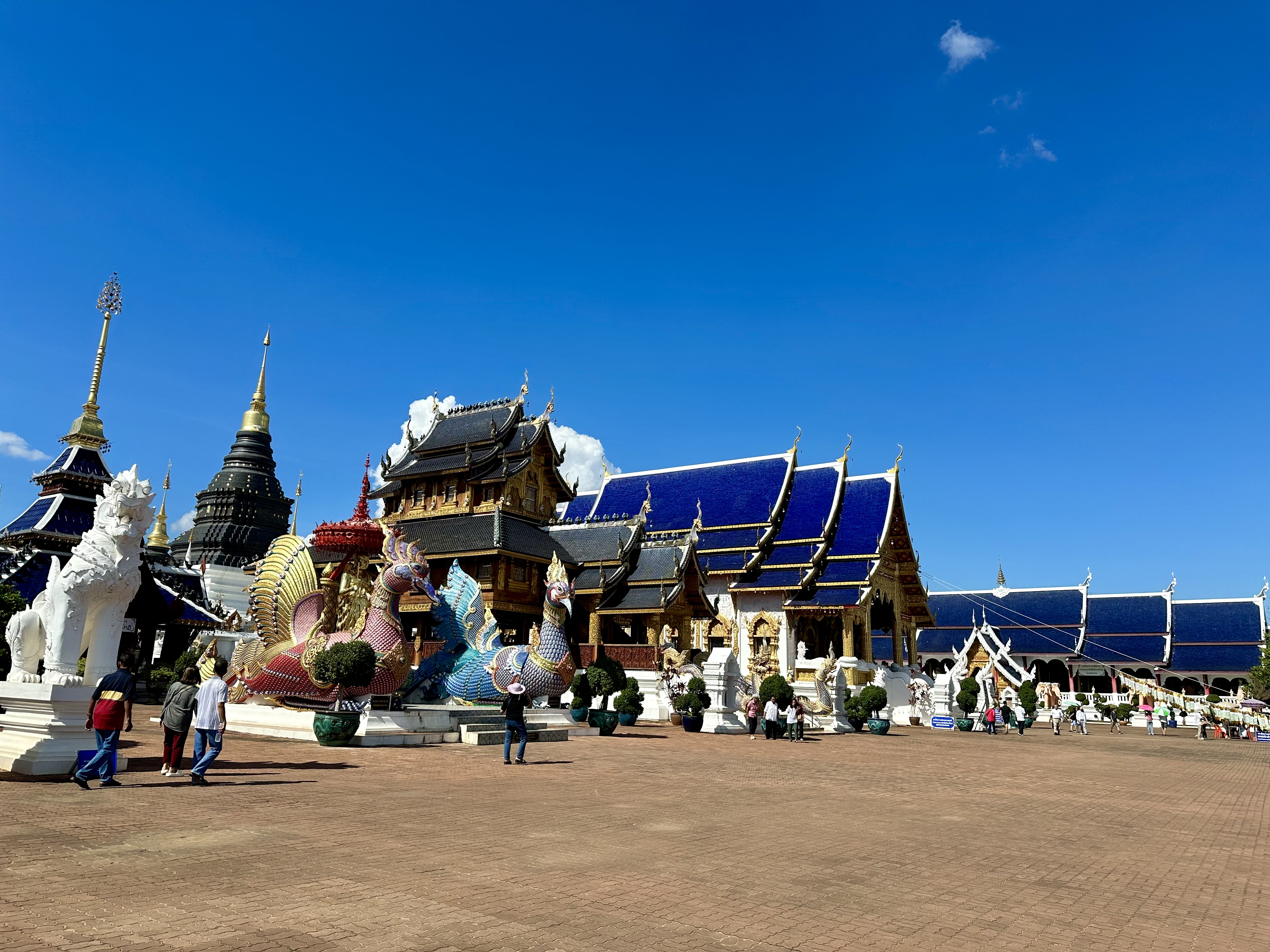
- Wat Den Sali Si Mueang Kaen

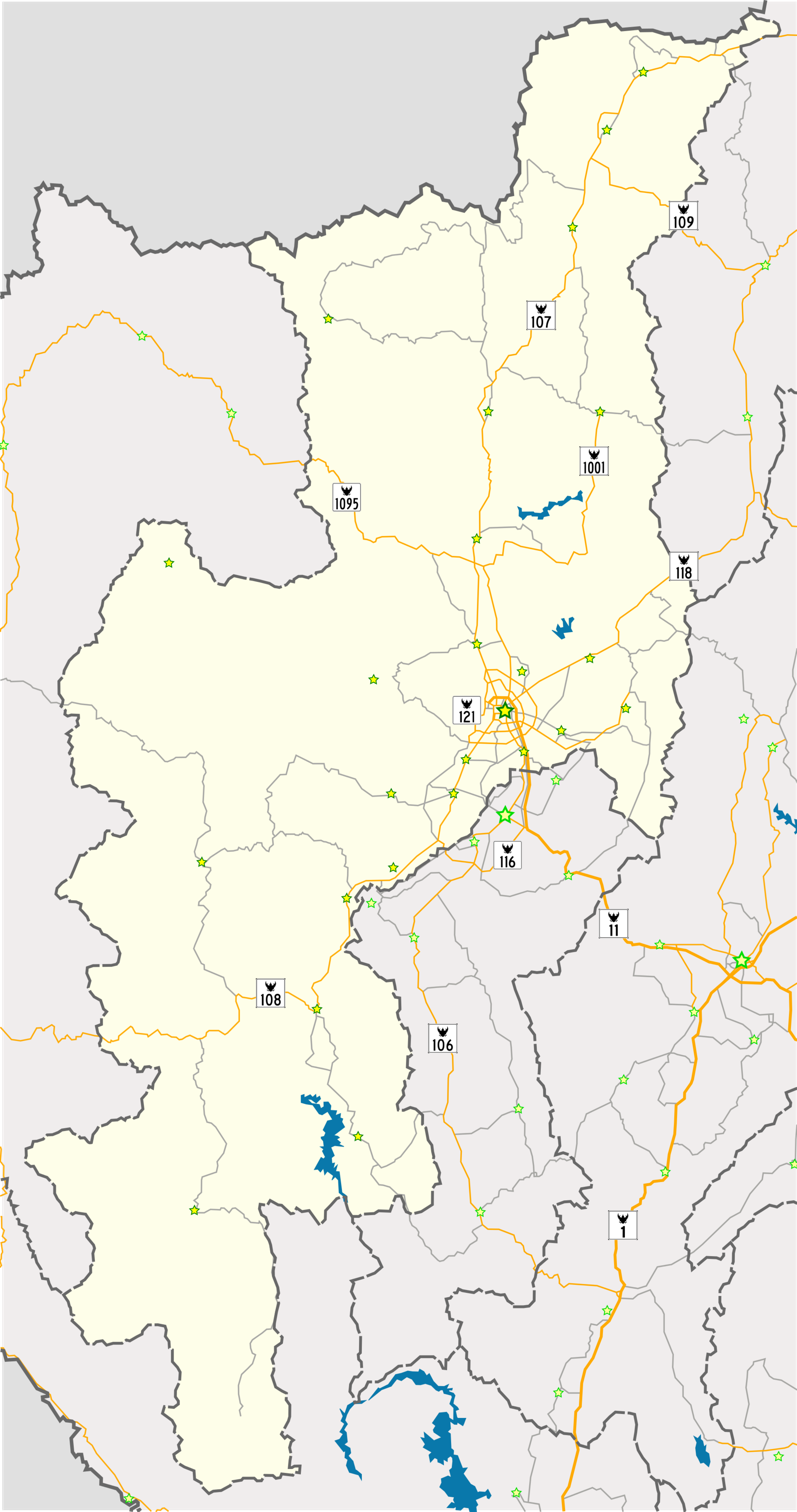
- Location within Chiang Mai Province Location within Thailand

Religion
- Affiliation: Buddhism
- District: Mae Taeng district
- Province: Chiang Mai Province
- Region: Northern Thailand
- Leadership: Kruba Thueang Natsilo
- Status: Active

Location
- Municipality: Chiang Mai
- Country: Thailand

Architecture
- Style: Lanna style
- Established: circa 16th century
- Completed: 1988

Wat Den Sali Si Mueang Kaen (วัดเด่นสะหลีศรีเมืองแกน), also known as Wat Ban Den (วัดบ้านเด่น), is a Buddhist temple located in Inthakhin, Mae Taeng district, Chiang Mai Province, Thailand. Known for its stunning architecture, the temple is a blend of traditional Lanna style and intricate modern craftsmanship. Situated on a small hill overlooking the village, this sacred site was once centered around a cave highly revered by the local community.

== History ==
The temple is also known as Wat Hri Bun Ruang (วัดหรีบุญเรือง). Originally a small temple dating back over 500 years in a rural village, Wat Den Sali Si Mueang Kaen underwent a remarkable transformation into a grand spiritual complex in 1894 under the leadership of Kruba Thueang Natsilo (ครูบาเทือง นาถสีโล), a revered abbot from Saraphi district. However, the temple remained in poor condition until 1988, when it was eventually rebuilt with donations from the local community and Buddhists from across Thailand.

Kruba Thueang Natsilo envisioned creating a sacred space that would draw visitors from across the globe. He spearheaded extensive restoration projects, expanding the temple and adorning it with intricate architectural details. Among the most notable features of Wat Ban Den is its collection of 12 stupas, each symbolizing a different zodiac sign. This distinctive characteristic has made the temple a renowned pilgrimage destination for those seeking spiritual blessings and good fortune.

Some of the special features of the temple

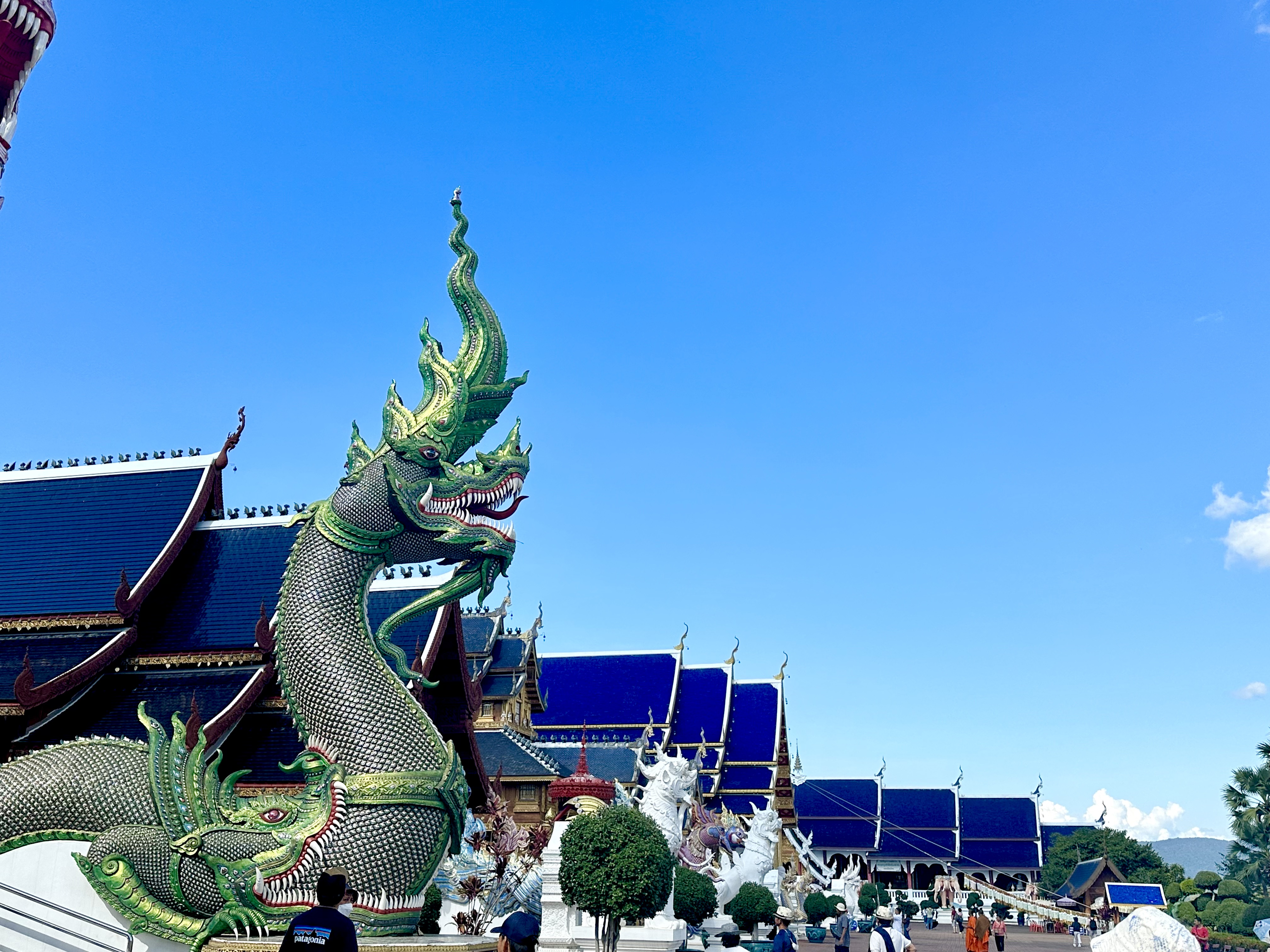

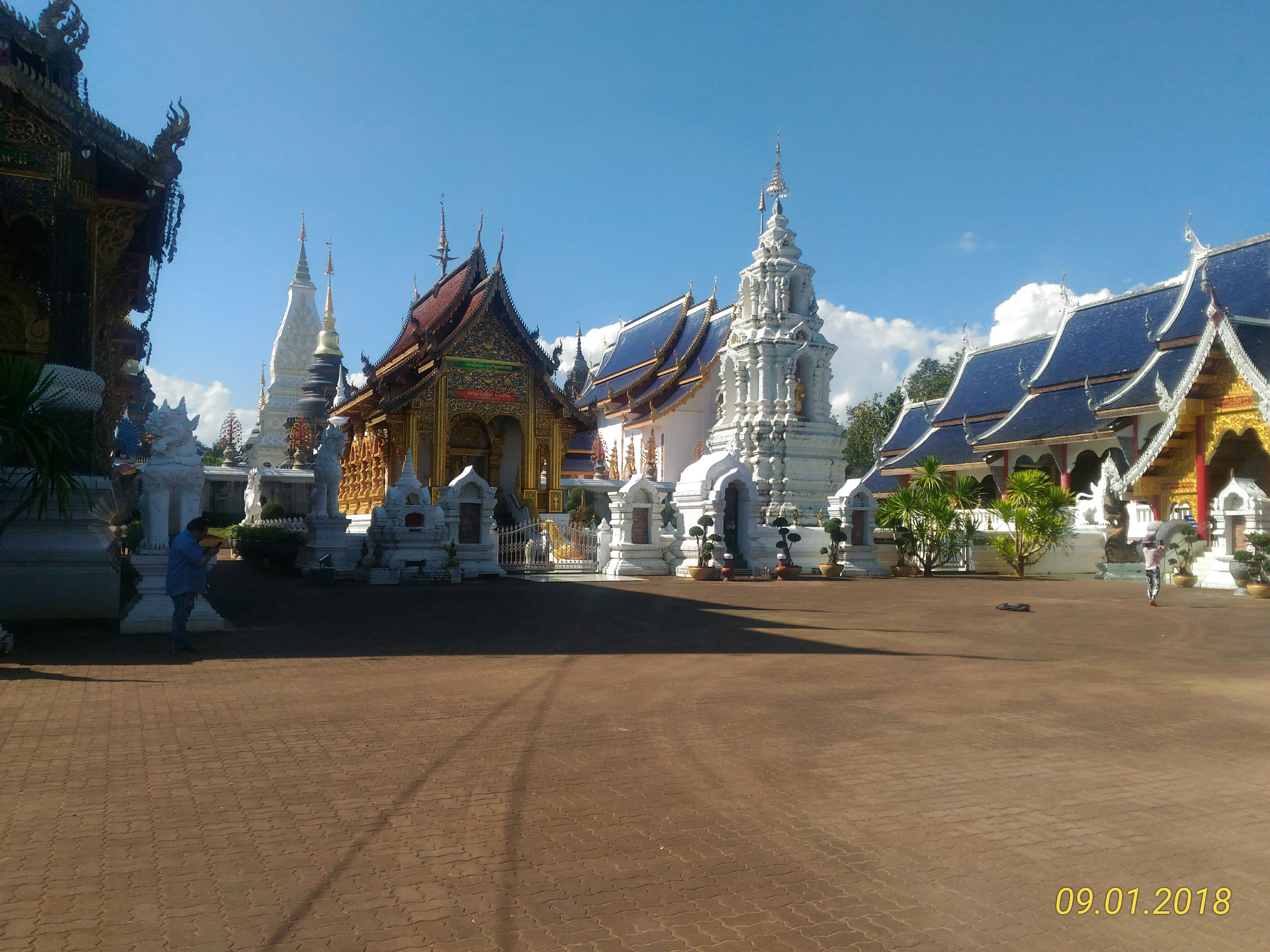

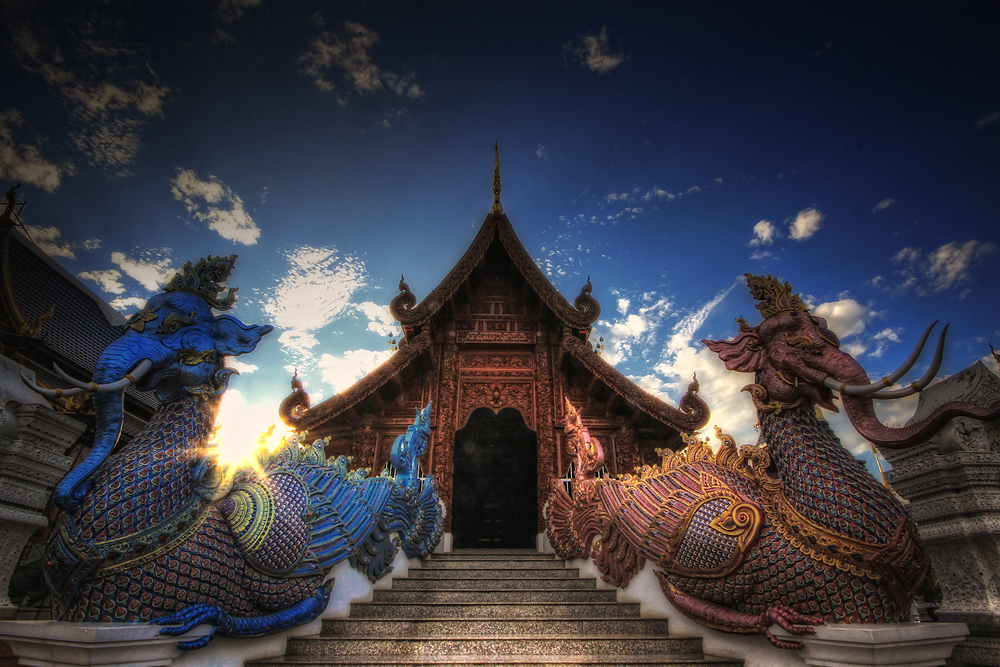

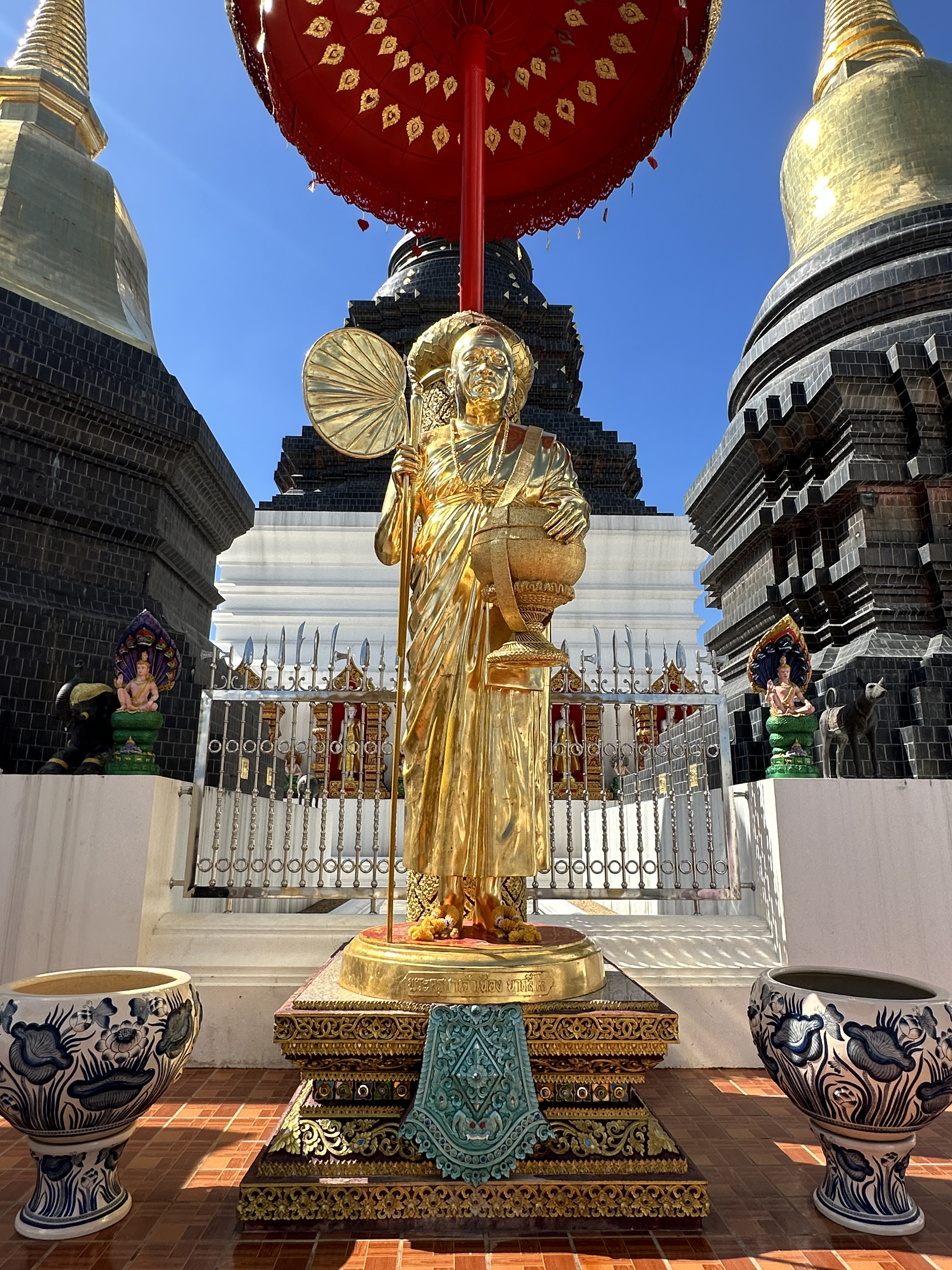

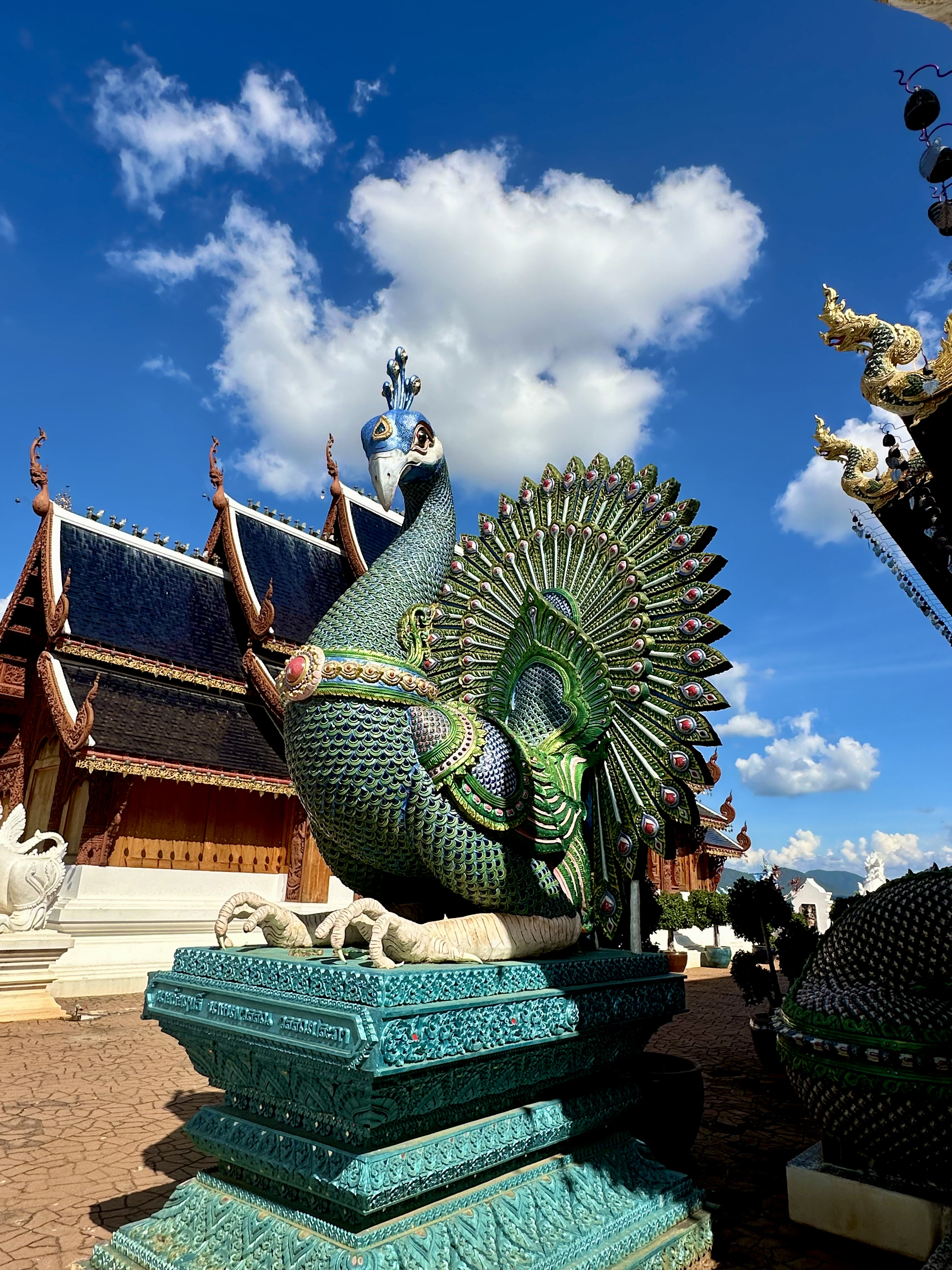

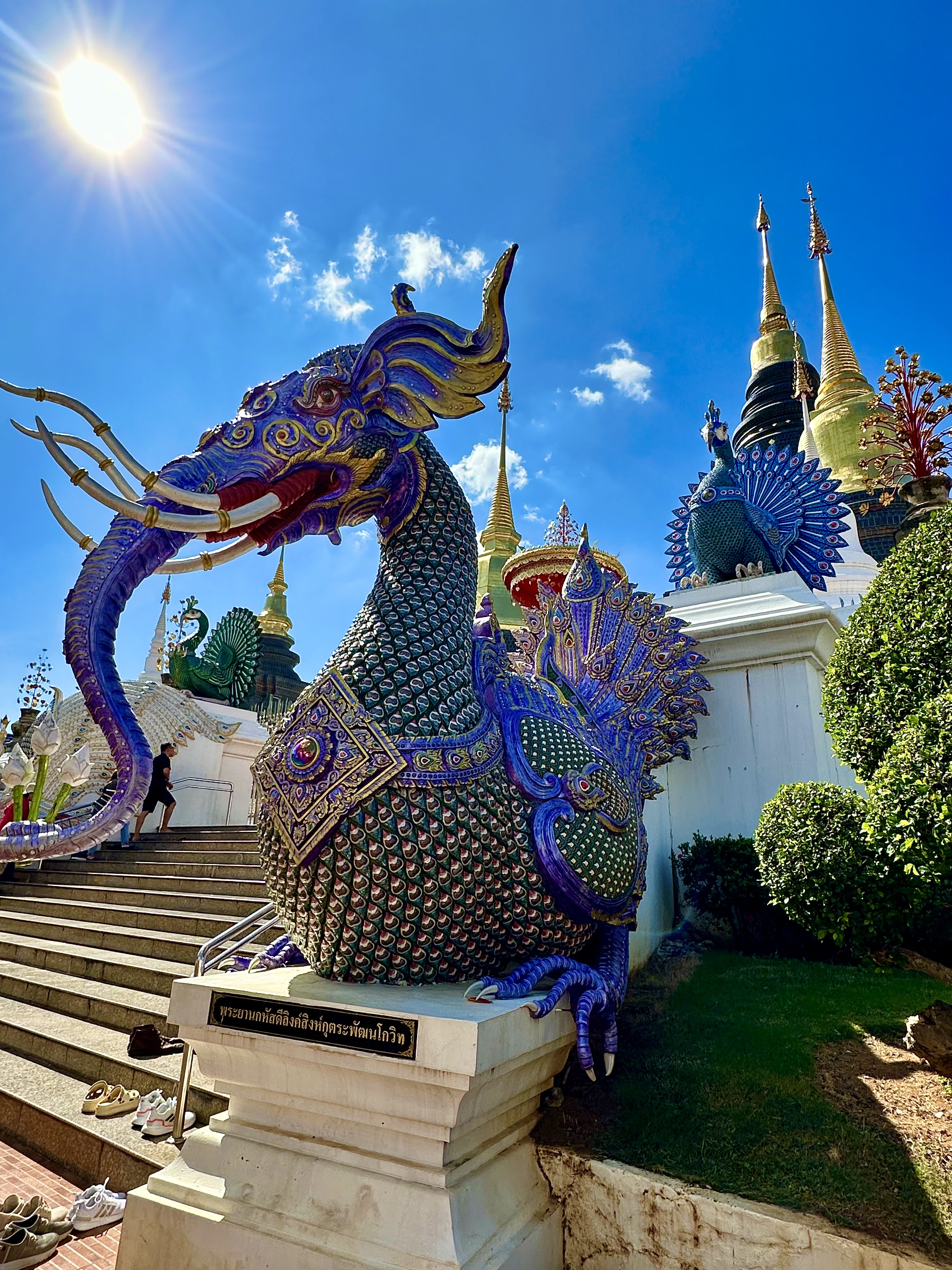

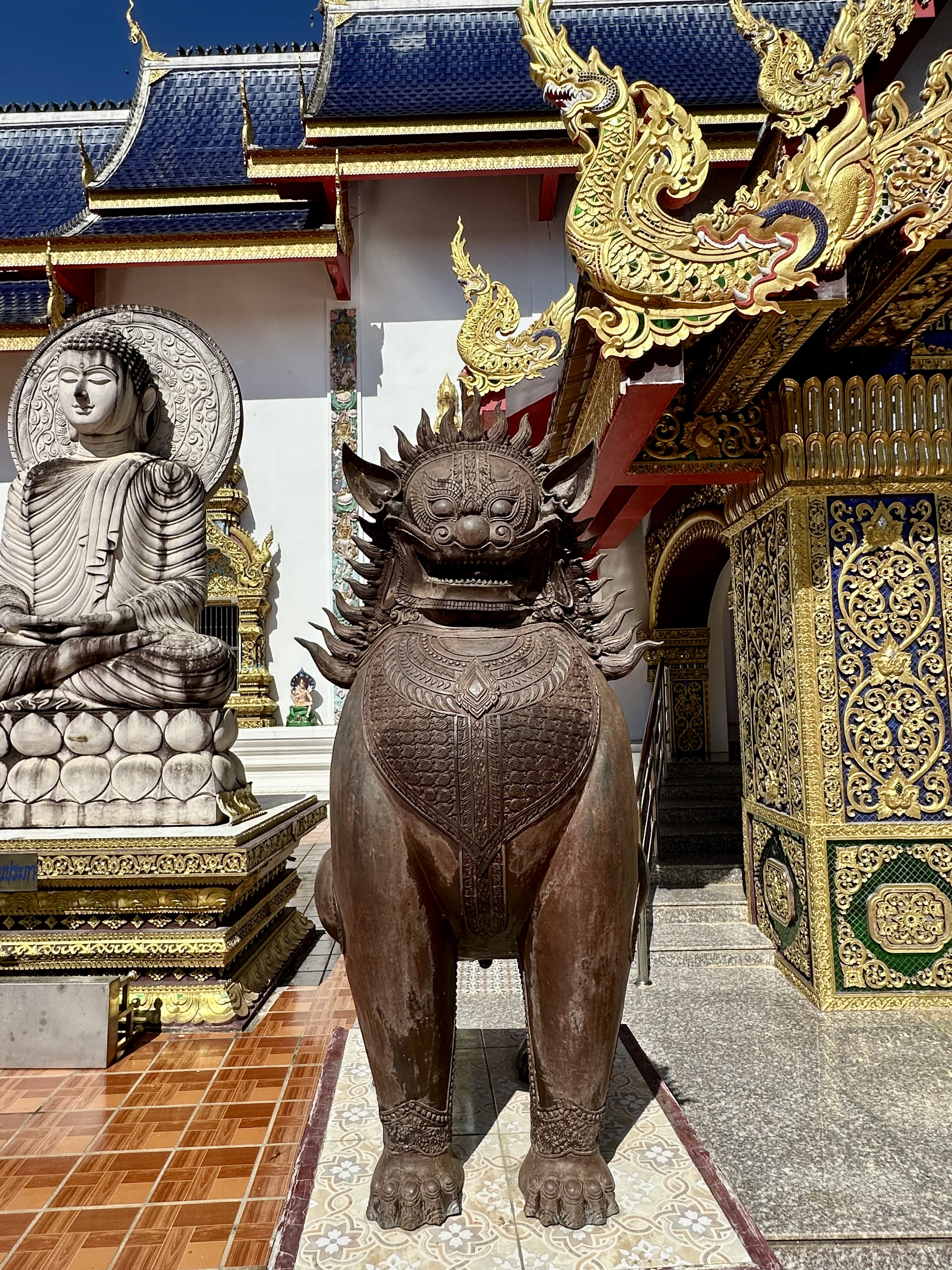

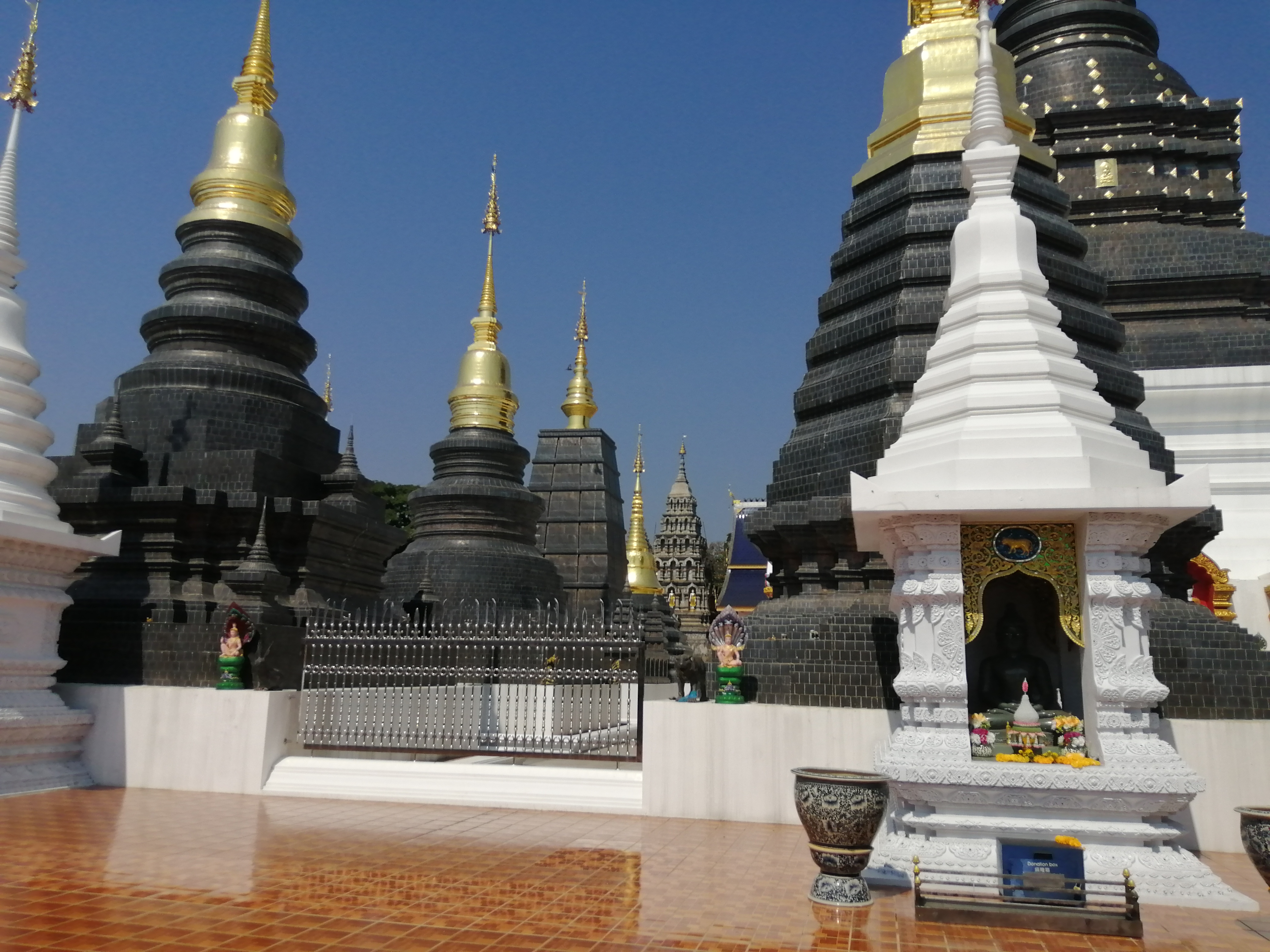
