= Inthakhin =

Coordinates: 19.1639°N 98.9484°E

Inthakhin อินทขิล
- Tambon
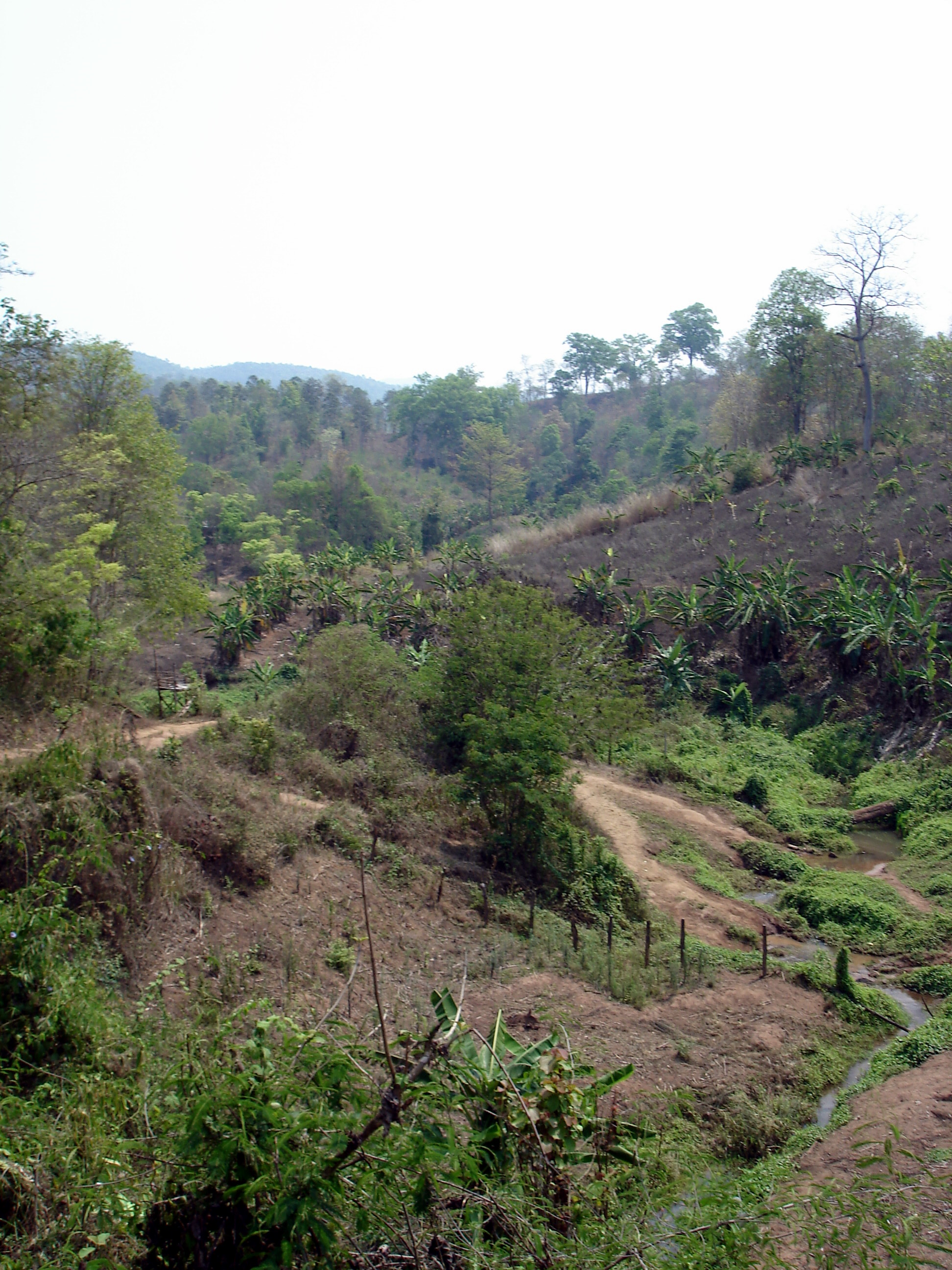
- Countryside around the Mae Ping Elephant School, Inthakhin
- Interactive map of Inthakhin
- Country: Thailand
- Province: Chiang Mai
- Amphoe: Mae Taeng

Population (2014)
  - Total: 12,867
- Time zone: UTC+7 (ICT)
- Postal code: 50150
- TIS 1099: 500613

Inthakhin (Thai: อินทขิล) is a tambon (sub-district) of Mae Taeng District, in Chiang Mai Province, Thailand. In 2014, it had a population of 12,867 people.

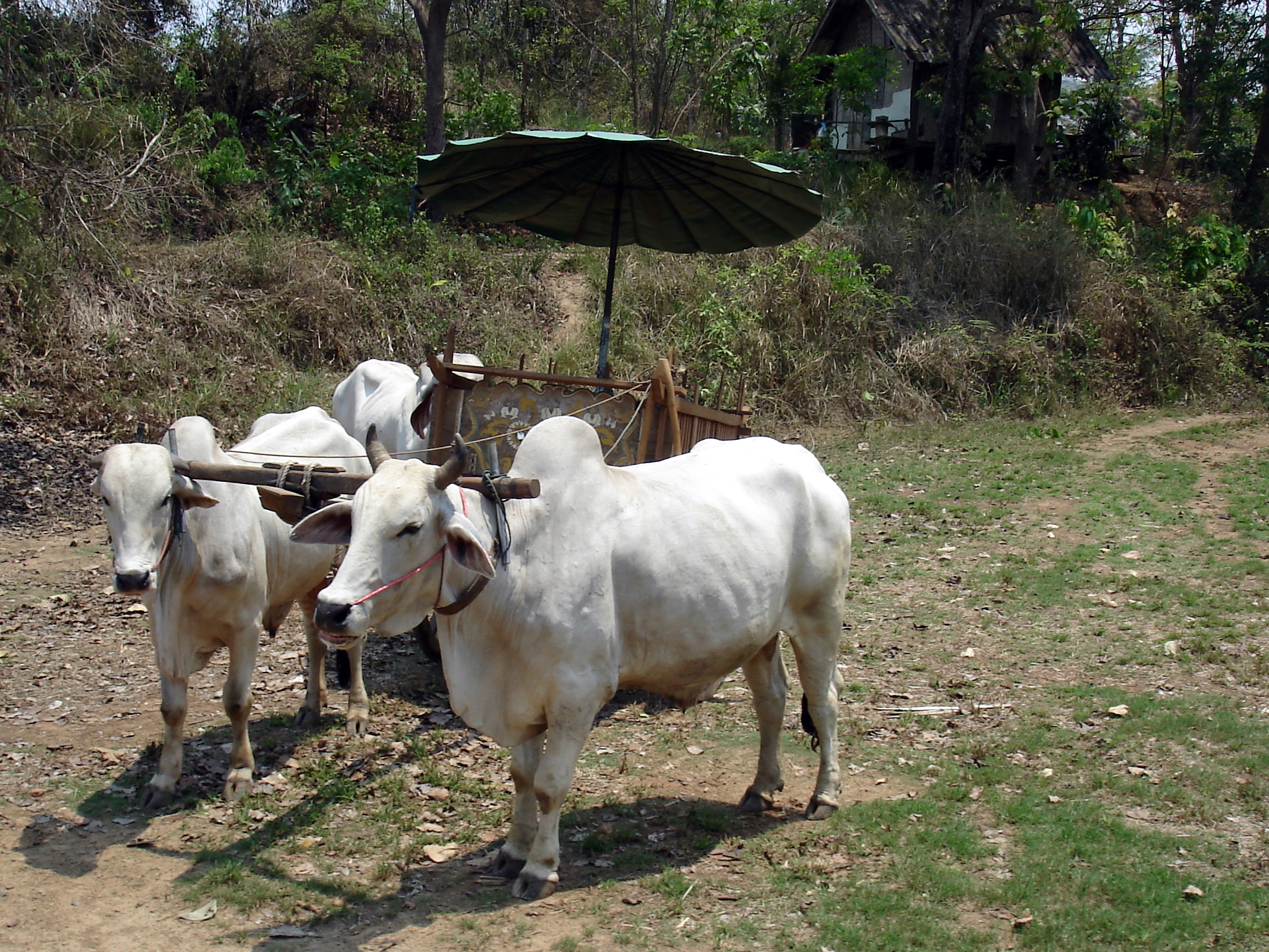
Ox-cart, Inthakhin

== Administration ==
=== Central administration ===
The tambon is divided into 19 administrative villages (muban).

No.	Name	Thai
1.	Ban Pa Chi	บ้านป่าจี้
2.	Ban Wang Daeng	บ้านวังแดง
3.	Ban Hua Dong	บ้านหัวดง
4.	Ban Muang Kham	บ้านม่วงคำ
5.	Ban Tha Ton Pui	บ้านท่าต้นปุย
6.	Ban Hang Dong	บ้านหางดง
7.	Ban Pong	บ้านปง
8.	Ban Den	บ้านเด่น
9.	Ban Thap Duea	บ้านทับเดื่อ
10.	Ban Nong On	บ้านหนองออน
11.	Ban San Pa Tong	บ้านสันป่าตอง
12.	Ban Pang Huai Tat	บ้านปางห้วยตาด
13.	Ban Pang Kwang	บ้านปางกว้าง
14.	Ban Mae Tha Lai	บ้านแม่ทะลาย
15.	Ban Pang Wiang Dong	บ้านปางเวียงด้ง
16.	Ban Pang Kuet	บ้านปางกื้ด
17.	Ban Muet Ka	บ้านมืดกา
18.	Ban Nong Phueng	บ้านหนองผึ้ง
19.	Ban Huai Fak Dap	บ้านห้วยฝักดาบ

=== Local administration ===
The area of the sub-district is shared by two local governments.

- the town (thesaban mueang) Mueang Kaen Phatthana (เทศบาลเมืองเมืองแกนพัฒนา)
- the sub-district municipality Inthakhin (เทศบาลตำบลอินทขิล)
