= Pa Pae, Chiang Mai =

Coordinates: 19.1220°N 98.7093°E

Pa Pae ป่าแป๋
- Tambon
- Interactive map of Pa Pae
- Country: Thailand
- Province: Chiang Mai
- Amphoe: Mae Taeng

Population (2005)
  - Total: 6,847
- Time zone: UTC+7 (ICT)

Pa Pae (Thai: ป่าแป๋) is a tambon (sub-district) of Mae Taeng District, in Chiang Mai Province, Thailand. In 2005, it had a population of 6,847 people. The tambon contains 14 villages.
