= Ban Chang, Chiang Mai =

Ban Chang บ้านช้าง
- Tambon
- Interactive map of Ban Chang
- Coordinates: 19.154067°N 98.859054°E
- Country: Thailand
- Province: Chiang Mai
- Amphoe: Mae Taeng

Population (2005)
  - Total: 5,488
- Time zone: UTC+7 (ICT)

Ban Chang (Thai: บ้านช้าง) is a tambon (sub-district) of Mae Taeng District, in Chiang Mai Province, Thailand. In 2005, it had a population of 5,488 people. The tambon contains five villages.
