= Mae Ho Phra =

Coordinates: 19.1050°N 99.0000°E

Mae Ho Phra แม่หอพระ
- Tambon
- Interactive map of Mae Ho Phra
- Country: Thailand
- Province: Chiang Mai
- Amphoe: Mae Taeng

Population (2005)
  - Total: 5,643
- Time zone: UTC+7 (ICT)

Mae Ho Phra (Thai: แม่หอพระ) is a tambon (sub-district) of Mae Taeng District, in Chiang Mai Province, Thailand. In 2005 it had a population of 5,643 people. The tambon contains nine villages.
