= Mae Taeng subdistrict =

Coordinates: 19°07′N 98°56′E

Mae Taeng แม่แตง
- Tambon and town
- Interactive map of Mae Taeng
- Country: Thailand
- Province: Chiang Mai
- Amphoe: Mae Taeng

Population (2005)
  - Total: 4,548
- Time zone: UTC+7 (ICT)

Mae Taeng (Thai: แม่แตง) is a town and tambon (sub-district) of Mae Taeng District, in Chiang Mai Province, Thailand. In 2005 it had a population of 4,548 people. The tambon contains eight villages.
