= Sop Poeng =

Sop Poeng สบเปิง
- Tambon
- Interactive map of Sop Poeng
- Coordinates: 19°05′47″N 98°50′54″E
- Country: Thailand
- Province: Chiang Mai
- Amphoe: Mae Taeng

Population (2020)
  - Total: 7,744
- Time zone: UTC+7 (TST)
- Postal code: 50150, 50330
- TIS 1099: 500606

Sop Poeng (Thai: สบเปิง) is a tambon (subdistrict) of Mae Taeng District, in Chiang Mai Province, Thailand. In 2020 it had a total population of 7,744 people.

== Administration ==
=== Central administration ===
The tambon is subdivided into 13 administrative villages (muban).

No.	Name	Thai
1.	Ban Pang Hang	บ้านปางฮ่าง
2.	Ban Pang Muang	บ้านปางม่วง
3.	Ban Sop Poeng	บ้านสบเปิง
4.	Ban Ton Ngun	บ้านต้นงุ้น
5.	Ban Rai	บ้านไร่
6.	Ban Tha Kham	บ้านท่าข้าม
7.	Ban Ton Lan	บ้านต้นลาน
8.	Ban Don Chiang	บ้านดอนเจียง
9.	Ban Nong Bua Luang	บ้านหนองบัวหลวง
10.	Ban Mae Lot	บ้านแม่หลอด
11.	Ban Pha Mon	บ้านผาหมอน
12.	Ban Long	บ้านล้อง
13.	Ban Sahakon Thung Mai	บ้านสหกรณ์ทุ่งใหม่

=== Local administration ===
The whole area of the subdistrict is covered by the subdistrict administrative organization (SAO) Sop Poeng (องค์การบริหารส่วนตำบลสบเปิง).
