= Mae Taeng district =

Mae Taeng แม่แตง
- District
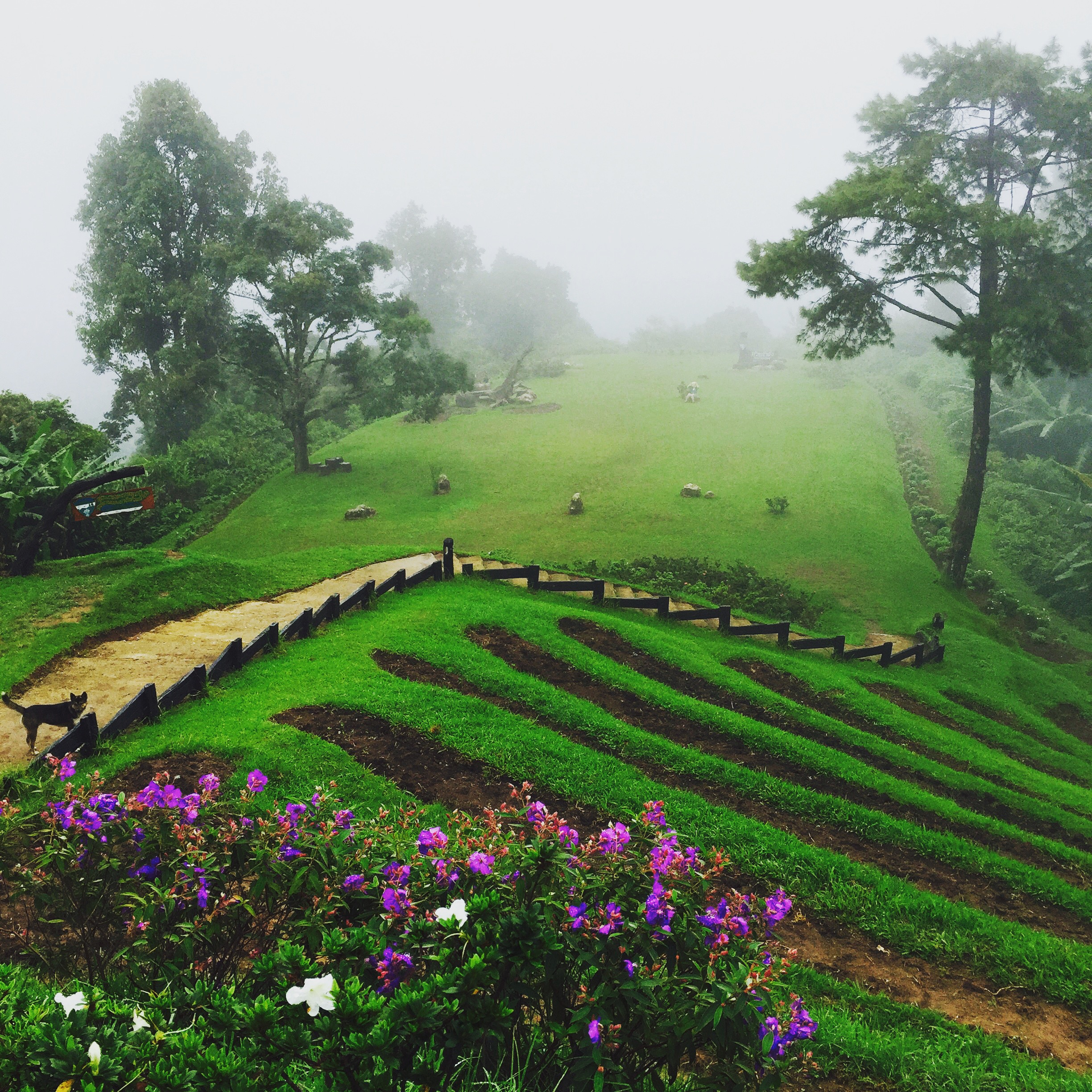
- Doi Kiew Lom

- District location in Chiang Mai province
- Coordinates: 19°7′19″N 98°56′37″E
- Country: Thailand
- Province: Chiang Mai
- Seat: San Maha Phon
- Tambon: 13
- Muban: 120

Area
  - Total: 1,362.784 km^{2} (526.174 sq mi)

Population (2014)
  - Total: 75,044
  - Density: 60.2/km^{2} (156/sq mi)
- Time zone: UTC+7 (ICT)
- Postal code: 50150, 50330
- Geocode: 5006

Mae Taeng (Thai: แม่แตง, pronounced [mɛ̂ː tɛ̄ːŋ]; Northern Thai: ᩯᨾ᩵ᩯᨲ᩠ᨦ, pronounced [mɛ̂ː tɛ̌ːŋ]) is a district (amphoe) in the northern part of Chiang Mai province in northern Thailand.

== Geography ==
Neighboring districts are (from the north clockwise) Chiang Dao, Phrao, Doi Saket, San Sai, Mae Rim, Samoeng of Chiang Mai Province and Pai of Mae Hong Son province.

The Taeng River, a river that has its source in the mountains of the Daen Lao Range in Wiang Haeng district, flows into the Ping River, one of the main tributaries of the Chao Phraya River, in Mae Taeng District.

There is a beautiful Lanna-style temple called Wat Ban Den in the Inthakhin village of the district. The temple is known for its stunning architecture and serene atmosphere.

== History ==
In 1892, Khwaeng Mueang Kuet (เมืองกื้ด) was created, and renamed in 1894 to Khwaeng Mueang Kaen (เมืองแกน). In 1907 it was upgraded to a district (amphoe) named San Maha Phon (สันมหาพน), and renamed Mae Tang in 1939.

== Administration ==
=== Central administration ===
Mae Taeng is divided into 13 sub-districts (tambon), which are further subdivided into 120 administrative villages (Muban).

No.	Name	Thai	Villages	Pop.
1.	San Maha Phon	สันมหาพน	10	6,590
2.	Mae Taeng	แม่แตง	8	4,398
3.	Khilek	ขี้เหล็ก	11	9,334
4.	Cho Lae	ช่อแล	6	4,467
5.	Mae Ho Phra	แม่หอพระ	9	5,383
6.	Sop Poeng	สบเปิง	13	7,753
7.	Ban Pao	บ้านเป้า	7	3,657
8.	San Pa Yang	สันป่ายาง	6	3,748
9.	Pa Pae	ป่าแป๋	13	6,175
10.	Mueang Kai	เมืองก๋าย	5	1,637
11.	Ban Chang	บ้านช้าง	5	3,883
12.	Kuet Chang	กื้ดช้าง	8	5,152
13.	Inthakhin	อินทขิล	19	12,867

=== Local administration ===
There is one town (thesaban mueang) in the district:

- Mueang Kaen Phatthana (Thai: เทศบาลเมืองเมืองแกนพัฒนา) consisting of sub-district Cho Lae and parts of sub-district Inthakhin.

There are five sub-district municipalities (thesaban tambons) in the district:

- San Maha Phon (Thai: เทศบาลตำบลสันมหาพน) consisting of sub-district San Maha Phon and parts of sub-district Khilek.
- Mae Taeng (Thai: เทศบาลตำบลแม่แตง) consisting of sub-district Mae Taeng.
- Chom Chaeng (Thai: เทศบาลตำบลจอมแจ้ง) consisting of parts of sub-district Khilek.
- Mae Ho Phra (Thai: เทศบาลตำบลแม่หอพระ) consisting of sub-district Mae Ho Phra.
- Inthakhin (Thai: เทศบาลตำบลอินทขิล) consisting of parts of sub-district Inthakhin.

There are seven subdistrict administrative organizations (SAO) in the district:

- Sop Poeng (Thai: องค์การบริหารส่วนตำบลสบเปิง) consisting of sub-district Sop Poeng.
- Ban Pao (Thai: องค์การบริหารส่วนตำบลบ้านเป้า) consisting of sub-district Ban Pao.
- San Pa Yang (Thai: องค์การบริหารส่วนตำบลสันป่ายาง) consisting of sub-district San Pa Yang.
- Pa Pae (Thai: องค์การบริหารส่วนตำบลป่าแป๋) consisting of sub-district Pa Pae.
- Mueang Kai (Thai: องค์การบริหารส่วนตำบลเมืองก๋าย) consisting of sub-district Mueang Kai.
- Ban Chang (Thai: องค์การบริหารส่วนตำบลบ้านช้าง) consisting of sub-district Ban Chang.
- Kuet Chang (Thai: องค์การบริหารส่วนตำบลกื้ดช้าง) consisting of sub-district Kuet Chang.

== See also ==
- Wat Aranyawiwake
- Wat Den Sali Si Mueang Kaen (also known as Wat Ban Den)
