= Guangchengzi =

Taoist immortal and character in Fengshen Yanyi

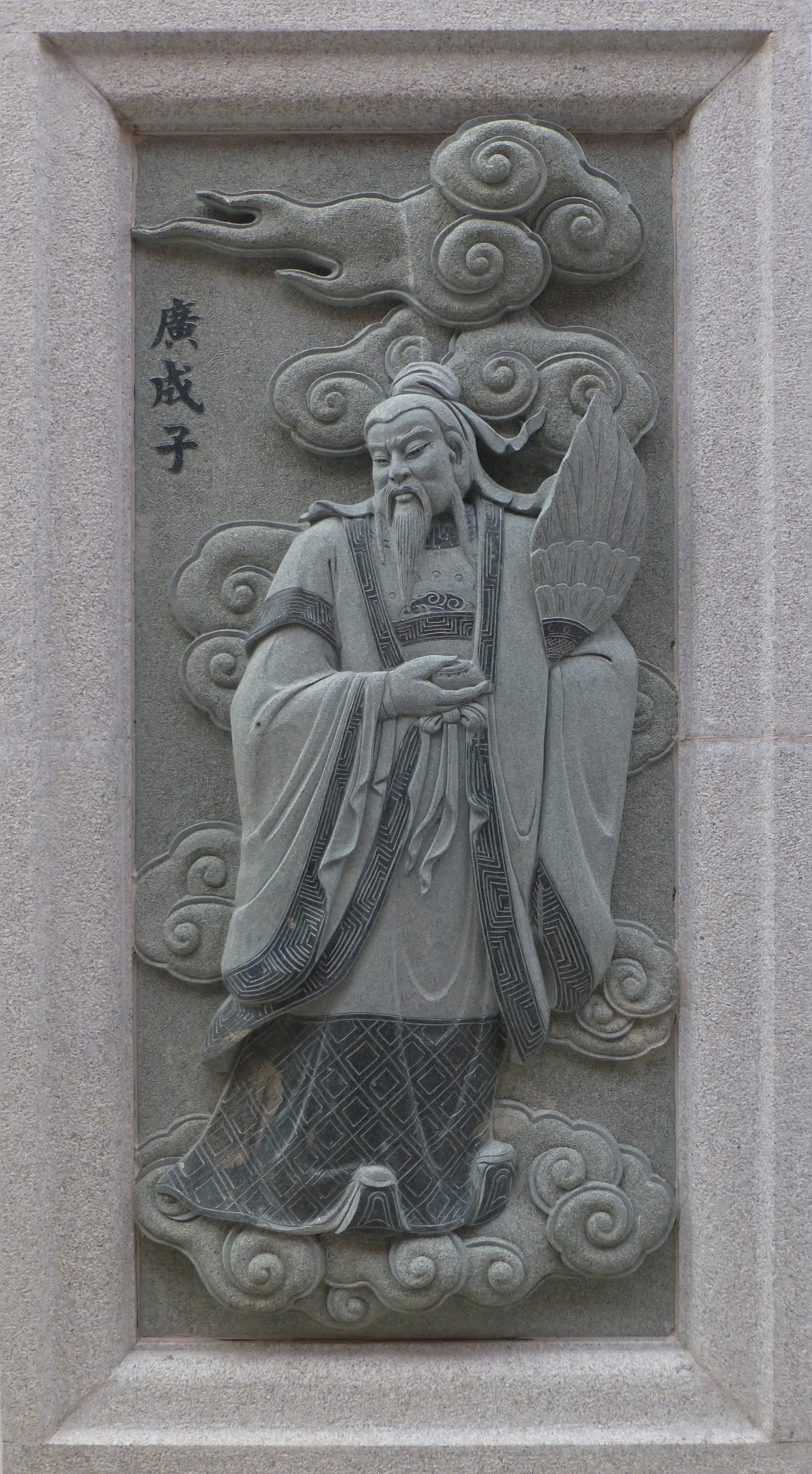
Relief of Guangchengzi at Ping Sien Si in Perak, Malaysia

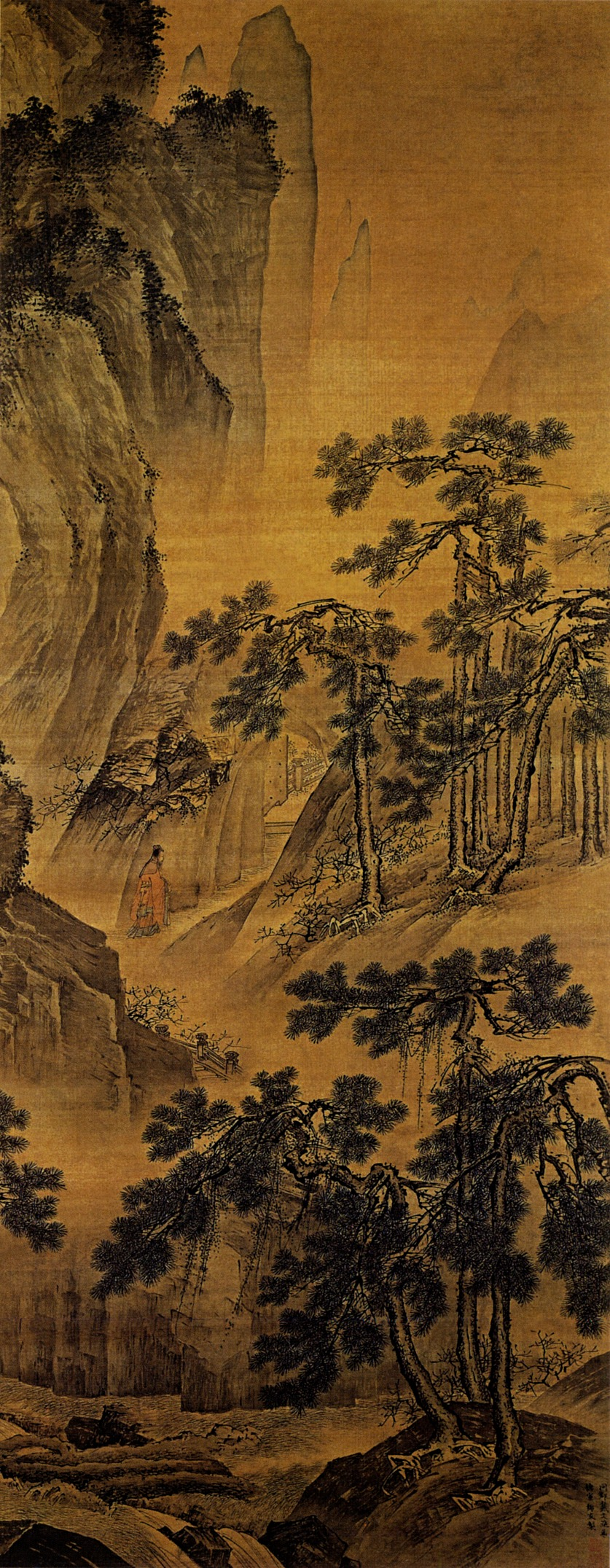
Inquiring of the Dao at the Cave of Paradise. The painting depicts the Yellow Emperor's visit to Guangchengzi in the Kongtong Mountains.

Guangchengzi (simplified Chinese: 广成子; traditional Chinese: 廣成子; pinyin: Guǎngchéngzǐ; Wade–Giles: Kuang ch'eng-tzu) is a legendary Daoist immortal who taught the Yellow Emperor about the Dao. He appears in the Zhuangzi and is also a character in the Chinese novel Fengshen Yanyi.

== In Daoist tradition ==
The earliest surviving account of Guangchengzi appears in the Zhuangzi. In the chapter "In the World Among Men" (在宥), the Yellow Emperor hears that Guangchengzi is living at Mount Kongtong and visits him to ask about the Dao. Guangchengzi initially rejects the Yellow Emperor's questions, saying that his concern with governing the world is too superficial for discussion of the highest Dao. The Yellow Emperor withdraws from public affairs for three months before returning to ask about cultivating the body. Guangchengzi then teaches him about stillness, preserving the spirit, and cultivating longevity. He says that he has practiced his method for 1,200 years without his body declining.

A later biography in Ge Hong's Shenxian Zhuan presents Guangchengzi explicitly as an ancient immortal living in a stone chamber on Mount Kongtong. It repeats the story of the Yellow Emperor's visit and Guangchengzi's teaching on cultivating the body and attaining longevity.

The Taishang Laojun Kaitian Jing gives a different account of Guangchengzi's identity. It states that during the reign of the Yellow Emperor, Taishang Laojun descended to become his teacher and took the name Guangchengzi. The text also credits him with teaching the principles of yin and yang and composing the Daojie Jing.

The Song-dynasty Taiping Guangji includes Guangchengzi in its section on immortals and preserves the biography from the Shenxian Zhuan.

== In Fengshen Yanyi ==
In Fengshen Yanyi, Guangchengzi is a disciple of Yuanshi Tianzun and one of the Twelve Golden Immortals of the Chanjiao (阐教). He resides at Peach-Source Cave (桃源洞) on Mount Jiuxian (九仙山). The novel's account therefore places him in a different location from the Mount Kongtong setting found in earlier Daoist literature.

At the beginning of the novel, Guangchengzi and Chijingzi pass through Zhaoge while the princes Yin Jiao and Yin Hong are awaiting execution. Guangchengzi and Chijingzi notice unusual signs surrounding the princes and decide to rescue them. Guangchengzi takes Yin Jiao as his disciple, while Chijingzi takes Yin Hong.

Guangchengzi later becomes involved in the conflict between Chanjiao and Jiejiao (截教). During the campaign against the Ten Absolute Formations, he breaks the Golden Light Formation (金光阵) and kills the formation's leader, Jin Guang Shengmu, with the Fantian Seal (番天印).

Guangchengzi later confronts Huo Ling Shengmu, a disciple of Duobao Daoren. He defeats her with the Fantian Seal and kills her. He then takes her Golden Radiance Crown (金霞冠) to Biyou Palace and returns it to Tongtian Jiaozhu. The incident leads to a series of confrontations between Guangchengzi and disciples of Jiejiao.

Guangchengzi subsequently visits Biyou Palace three times to meet Tongtian Jiaozhu. During his third visit, he clashes with the Jiejiao immortal Guiling Shengmu. Guangchengzi uses the Fantian Seal against her, forcing her to reveal her original form as a tortoise. Tongtian Jiaozhu later rebukes his disciple Guiling Shengmu and allows Guangchengzi to leave.

During the attack on the Immortal-Slaying Sword Formation (诛仙阵), Guangchengzi fights Duobao Daoren and strikes him with the Fantian Seal. Later, Guangchengzi is one of the four immortals ordered to remove the four swords of the formation after Yuanshi Tianzun inscribes talismanic seals on their hands.

=== Yin Jiao ===
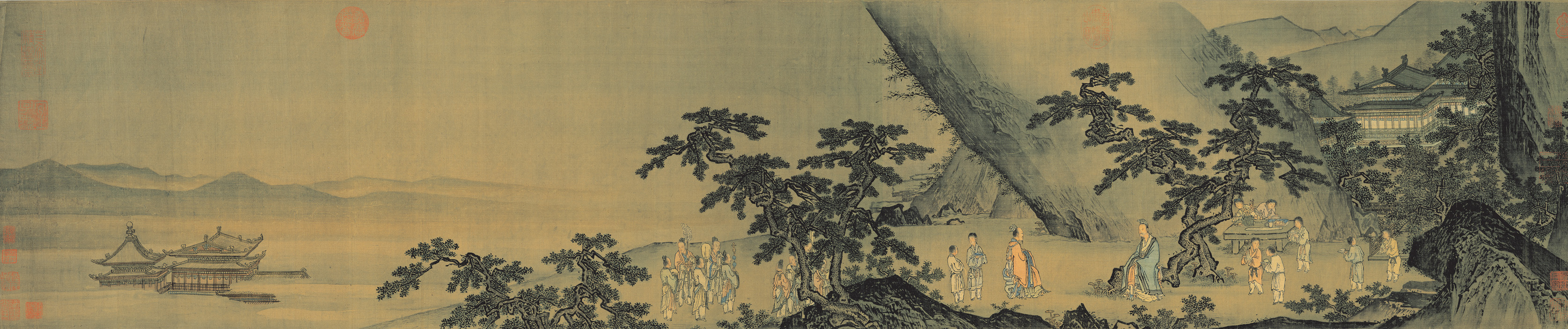
Shi Rui, Xuan Yuan Inquires of the Dao, National Palace Museum, Taipei

Guangchengzi's most important disciple in the novel is Yin Jiao, the eldest son of King Zhou of Shang. After rescuing Yin Jiao, Guangchengzi trains him at Peach-Source Cave. When Yin Jiao is ready to leave the mountain, Guangchengzi gives him the Fantian Seal, Luohun Bell (落魂钟), and Female-Male Swords (雌雄剑), together with a military weapon, and orders him to assist King Wu of Zhou and Jiang Ziya.

Yin Jiao encounters Shen Gongbao on his way to join the Zhou army. Shen Gongbao persuades him to turn against the Zhou cause after telling him of the death of his younger brother Yin Hong. Yin Jiao joins the Shang forces and uses the weapons given to him by Guangchengzi against the Zhou army. Guangchengzi later confronts his disciple and attempts to persuade him to return to the oath he made before leaving the mountain.

The conflict eventually leads to Guangchengzi fighting Yin Jiao. Guangchengzi is unable to defeat him while Yin Jiao uses the Fantian Seal and is forced to retreat. Yin Jiao is later defeated by the Zhou forces and killed by the earth-ploughing execution at Mount Qi. Guangchengzi's attempt to train and direct Yin Jiao is therefore unsuccessful.

=== Weapons ===
The Fantian Seal is Guangchengzi's best-known magical weapon. He uses it repeatedly in battles, including against Jin Guang Shengmu, Huo Ling Shengmu, Guiling Shengmu, and Duobao Daoren. In the novel it strikes its targets with great force, and Guangchengzi uses it as his principal weapon in several major encounters.

The Luohun Bell and Female-Male Swords are among the treasures Guangchengzi gives to Yin Jiao. The novel later shows Yin Jiao using the Fantian Seal and shaking the Luohun Bell during his battles with the Zhou forces.

Guangchengzi also possesses the Saoxia Robe (扫霞衣), which he uses against the Golden Radiance Crown of Huo Ling Shengmu. The robe disperses the light produced by the crown during their confrontation.

== Temples and religious sites ==
The Tang-dynasty Stele Record of Guangcheng Palace (廣成宮碑記) describes Guangchengzi as a teacher of the Yellow Emperor and records the establishment and restoration of a temple dedicated to him. The inscription also states that people in different areas identified with Mount Kongtong had established temples to Guangchengzi.

At Mount Kongtong in Pingliang, Gansu, several sites mark the place where Guangchengzi is said to have taught the Yellow Emperor. These include Guangchengzi Cave and a site said to be his tomb. A similar tradition exists in Ruzhou, Henan. The local Ruzhou Gazetteer records a Guangcheng Temple (广成庙), Kongtong Temple (崆峒观), and a tomb said to belong to Guangchengzi. These sites are linked to the story of the Yellow Emperor visiting him to learn the Dao.

A Guangchengzi Hall (广成子殿) was also recorded at Mount Kongtong in Jizhou, Tianjin. A local historical account states that the hall was rebuilt in 1800 during the Jiaqing reign of the Qing dynasty. The site has since disappeared, and its foundations were later converted to farmland.

At Qingyang Palace in Chengdu, the Sanqing Hall contains images of the Twelve Golden Immortals, including Guangchengzi. The principal images in the hall are the Three Pure Ones.
