= Queen Jiang (character) =

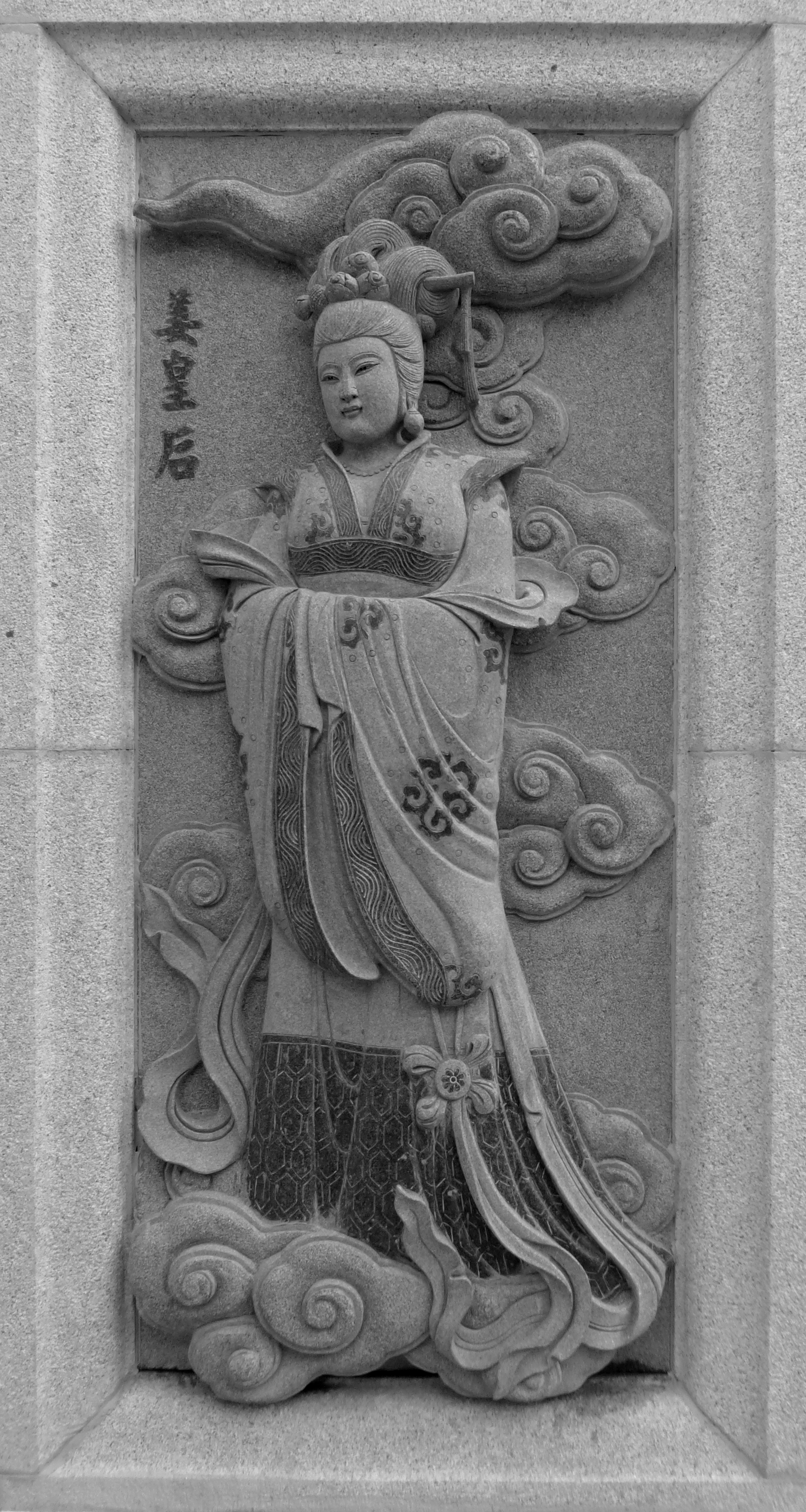
Relief of Queen Jiang

Queen Jiang (Chinese: 姜王后) is a fictional queen and later deity in Chinese mythology. She first appeared in the Song–Yuan dynasty tale Quanxiang Wuwang Fazhou Pinghua (全相武王伐纣平话; Wǔwáng Fá Zhòu Pínghuà) and later became a character in the Ming dynasty novel Investiture of the Gods (Fengshen Yanyi). In the novel, she is the first queen consort of Di Xin and the mother of the princes Yin Jiao and Yin Hong.

After her death, Queen Jiang is deified as the Taiyin Star (太阴星), one of the celestial deities appointed during the Investiture of the Gods.

== Literary origins ==
Queen Jiang may have been based on Jiuhou Nü (九侯女), a woman mentioned in early Chinese historical accounts. The Shiji says that she was the daughter of Jiuhou, also called Guihou (鬼侯). Her father sent her to King Zhou of Shang, but the king later killed her because she disliked his sexual excesses. He also had her father killed.

Queen Jiang also appears in the Yuan dynasty story Quanxiang Wuwang Fazhou Pinghua (全相武王伐紂平話), which was written before Investiture of the Gods. She is the wife of King Zhou and the mother of Yin Jiao. After her death, Yin Jiao tries to avenge her by killing Daji.

== Fengshen Yanyi ==
Queen Jiang as depicted in the novel

In Fengshen Yanyi , Queen Jiang was the daughter of the Eastern Duke, Jiang Huanchu. She was of extraordinary beauty and became the queen consort of Di Xin. She gave birth to two sons, Yin Jiao and Yin Hong. At that time, Daji, who was of bewitching beauty, had just been selected for the palace and was honored as the imperial concubine. She was not familiar with Jiang, but they became acquainted a few months later. Two years later, Jiang was crowned queen, which aroused Daji's jealousy. As a result, Daji launched a series of conspiracies to frame Queen Jiang.

After being framed by Daji, Jiang was demoted to the status of imperial concubine by Di Xin of Shang and banished to the cold palace. In her solitude there, Daji gained favor, while Jiang endured loneliness. Despite Yin Jiao and Yin Hong, her two sons, informing Di Xin of Shang about everything, the king chose to heed Daji's slanderous words and disregarded his sons' counsel, opting instead to punish the two princes with beatings. Two months later, Lady Yin, the wife of Li Jing, spoke of Queen Jiang's virtues in front of Di Xin. Upon hearing this, Di Xin released Queen Jiang. That night, Di Xin reinstated Jiang as queen once again.

Once, under the influence of alcohol, Daji accompanied Di Xin in disguise for a patrol. After two hours, they returned on horseback. Later, in a fit of jealousy, Daji punished Queen Jiang with thirty lashes and sent her to the cold palace. To prove her innocence, Queen Jiang sent a messenger pigeon to Lady Yin, the wife of Li Jing. Upon receiving the message, Lady Yin rushed to the cold palace. When Lady Yin entered the cold palace, she saw Queen Jiang being gouged out of her eyes, so she went to stop her. However, Queen Jiang was already dead. After the conclusion of the event, Daji slandered Di Xin by accusing Queen Jiang of plotting rebellion, attempting to assassinate Di Xin, and assisting her father, Duke Jiang Huanchu, in usurping the throne of Shang from the Zhou dynasty. Subsequently, Di Xin enfeoffed Daji as queen. After Queen Jiang's death, her two sons, Yin Jiao and Yin Hong, were marginalized by Daji and eventually slandered to death by Di Xin. When Jiang Ziya was naming gods, Queen Jiang was appointed as the Taiyin Star.

== Tomb ==
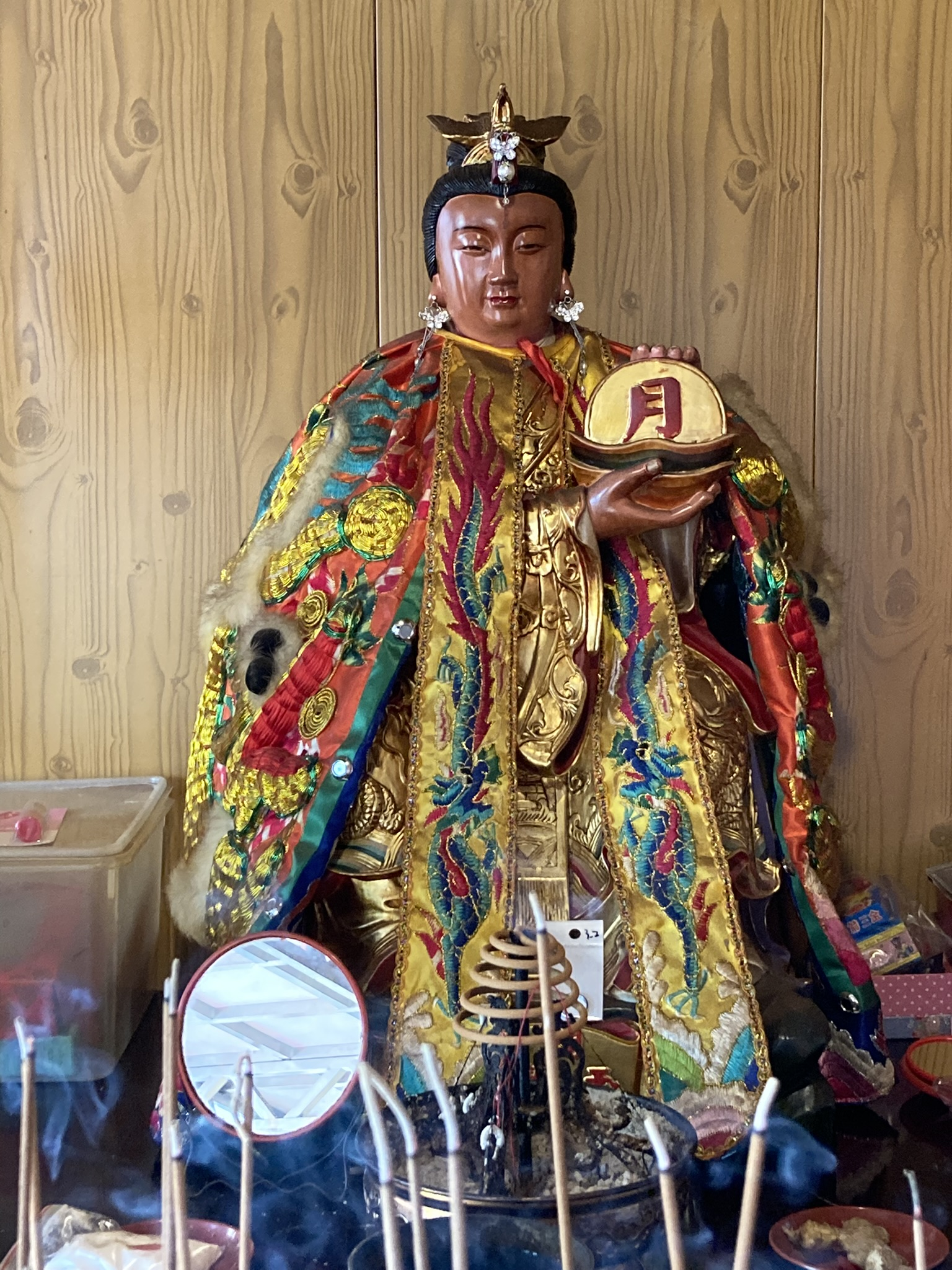
Statue of Taiyin Xingjun, enshrined in the Kaijiyu Temple in Tainan City, Taiwan

Despite being a fictional character, Queen Jiang has a physical tomb in Henan Province. In Qi County (the site of ancient Zhaoge), local tradition identifies a tomb beside the King Zhou Mausoleum as the Tomb of Queen Jiang (姜王后墓). Another nearby tomb is identified as that of Su Daji, forming a traditional "one ruler, two consorts" (一主二配) burial arrangement.

== In popular culture ==
- Portrayed by Yuan Quan in 2023 Chinese film Creation of the Gods I: Kingdom of Storms\

=== Modern adaptations ===
In the 2023 Chinese fantasy film Creation of the Gods I: Kingdom of Storms, Queen Jiang's costume design was inspired by the female deities depicted in the Yuan dynasty Chaoyuan Tu (朝元图) murals at Yongle Palace in Shanxi. Her clothing and phoenix crown were modeled on the traditional Daoist mural paintings.
