= Kongtong =

Kongtong may refer to:

- Kongtong District, district in Gansu, China
- Kongtong Mountains, sacred mountain of Taoism, in Gansu, China
- Kongtong, Mawkmai, Shan State, Burma
