= Yin Jiao (deity) =

Chinese deity and character in Fengshen Yanyi

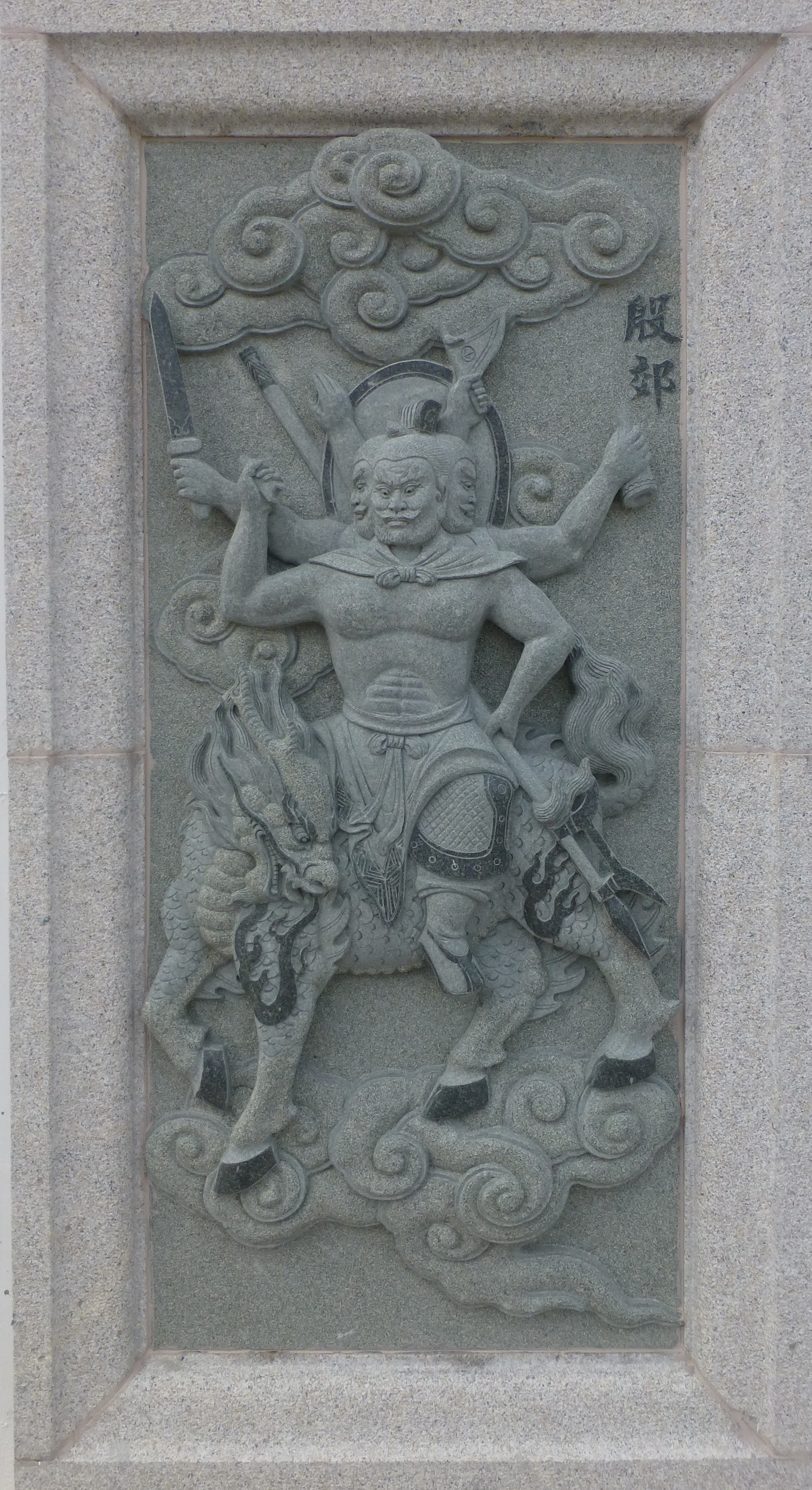
Yin Jiao at Ping Sien Si Temple in Perak, Malaysia

Yin Jiao (Chinese: 殷郊; pinyin: Yīn Jiāo; also written 殷交), also known as Yin Yuanshuai (殷元帅), is a Chinese god of Tai Sui and a character in Fengshen Yanyi. In Taoism, he is a divine commander who fights evil spirits and disease. In Fengshen Yanyi, he is the eldest son of King Zhou of Shang and Queen Jiang. After his death, Jiang Ziya makes him the Tai Sui God.

== Role in the novel ==
In Fengshen Yanyi, Yin Jiao is the crown prince of Shang. After Daji causes the death of his mother, Yin Jiao and his younger brother Yin Hong try to avenge her. King Zhou orders them to be killed, but Guangchengzi and Chijingzi save them. Guangchengzi takes Yin Jiao as his disciple, while Chijingzi takes Yin Hong.

Guangchengzi later sends Yin Jiao to help King Wu of Zhou fight against Shang. He gives him the Fantian Seal (番天印), the Soul-Falling Bell (落魂钟), two swords, and a halberd. Yin Jiao also gains three heads and six arms after eating magical beans. He promises to help Zhou and swears that he will die by plow and hoe if he breaks his word.

On his way to the Zhou camp, Yin Jiao meets Shen Gongbao. He learns that his brother has died while fighting for Shang. He then decides to support his father instead of Zhou. He uses his magical weapons to defeat several Zhou commanders.

Guangchengzi tries to stop him, but Yin Jiao refuses to change sides. The Zhou army later traps him at Qishan. He is killed with a plow, as he had sworn to his teacher. After his death, he appears to King Zhou in a dream and asks him to rule wisely. King Zhou ignores him.

At the end of the novel, Jiang Ziya appoints Yin Jiao as the Tai Sui God (值年岁君太岁之神), who governs the fortunes of each year.

== Daoist traditions ==
Yin Jiao was worshipped as a Tai Sui god before Fengshen Yanyi was written. Early Daoist texts call him Yin Yuanshuai (殷元帅). The Taishang Sandong Shenzhou (太上三洞神咒) contains a spell for summoning him.

The Daofa Huiyuan (道法会元) gives him the title Tai Sui Greatly Powerful and Virtuous Marshal Yin Jiao (太岁大威力至德元帅殷郊). He serves the Northern Emperor and is summoned in rituals against disease and evil spirits.

Another section of the Daofa Huiyuan describes him with a blue-green face, red hair, and a golden crown. He wears a red robe and twelve skulls around his neck. He carries a golden bell and an axe, with the sun and moon in his hands.

The Fahai Yizhu (法海遗珠) gives him other weapons, including a seal, banners, a halberd, and a sword.

== Tai Sui ==
Yin Jiao is called Taisui Tongling Yin Yuanshuai (太岁统领殷元帅), the commander of the Tai Sui gods. He is not one of the sixty gods who rule the years of the sexagenary cycle. Tai Sui (太岁) is a god of the year in Chinese religion. The belief comes from ancient Chinese astrology and the movement of Jupiter. People believed that disturbing the ground in Tai Sui's direction could bring illness and other disasters. In another tradition, Tai Sui is a strange mass of flesh found underground. Stories in the Taiping Guangji tell of people who suffered disasters after digging up Tai Sui.

== Other legends ==
In the Sanjiao yuanliu soushen daquan (三教源流搜神大全), Yin Jiao is also the son of King Zhou and Queen Jiang. He is born as a ball of flesh after his mother steps into a giant footprint. Daji calls him a monster and persuades King Zhou to abandon him. Animals protect the child until an immortal named Shen Zhenren (申真人) finds him. The immortal cuts open the flesh and saves the baby. A woman named He Xiangu (贺仙姑) raises him. Yin Jiao later learns magical arts from Shen Zhenren.

Yin Jiao learns how Daji caused his mother's death and decides to take revenge. He receives divine weapons and kills twelve skull spirits, whose heads he wears around his neck. He joins King Wu's army against Shang. When the Shang capital falls, Yin Jiao captures Daji and kills her with an axe. The Jade Emperor then gives him the title Earth Bureau Nine Heavens Patrol Envoy and Virtuous Tai Sui Marshal (地司九天游奕使至德太岁杀伐威权殷元帅).

== Worship ==
Yin Jiao is worshipped as a Tai Sui god in Chinese folk religion. Some temples in Taiwan place him among the divine commanders and guardians. He is also worshipped alongside other Tai Sui gods.

Worshippers perform an Tai Sui (安太岁) rituals to seek protection from bad fortune during the year. These rituals are for the Tai Sui gods in general, rather than Yin Jiao alone.

== In popular culture ==
Yin Jiao appears in the television series The Investiture of the Gods (2014) and Investiture of the Gods (2019).

Chen Muchi plays Yin Jiao in Creation of the Gods I: Kingdom of Storms (2023) and Creation of the Gods II: Demon Force (2025).
