= Creation of the Gods II: Demon Force =

2025 fantasy film directed by Wuershan

- Theatrical release poster
- Traditional Chinese: 封神第二部：戰火西岐
- Simplified Chinese: 封神第二部：战火西岐
- Directed by: Wuershan
- Written by: Ran Ping; Ran Jianan; Wuershan; Cao Sheng
- Based on: Investiture of the Gods by Xu Zhonglin
- Produced by: William Kong; Huang Bo
- Starring: Yu Shi; Fei Xiang; Li Xuejian; Huang Bo
- Cinematography: Wang Yu
- Edited by: Huang Shuo
- Music by: Gordy Haab; Tian Mi
- Production companies: Alibaba Pictures Group; Beijing Culture; Huaxia Film Distribution; Mongketengri Pictures; Jiangsu Film Group Co., Ltd.; Shanghai Skyeye Entertainment Co.; Putian Entertainment
- Distributed by: CMC Pictures
- Release date: January 29, 2025 (China)
- Running time: 145 minutes
- Country: China
- Language: Mandarin
- Budget: $120 million
- Box office: $173.22 million

Creation of the Gods II: Demon Force is a 2025 Chinese epic fantasy film directed by Wuershan. The sequel to Creation of the Gods I: Kingdom of Storms, it is the second film in the trilogy, adapted from the 16th-century fantasy novel Investiture of the Gods by Ming dynasty author Xu Zhonglin. Following the ascension of the tyrannical King Zhou of the Shang dynasty in the first film, Demon Force depicts the city of Xiqi's defense against a siege by the Shang army.

The film premiered on 29 January 2025, coinciding with Chinese New Year, with a wide release starting on 31 January. It received generally positive reviews from critics, though it only grossed $169 million, less than half of what the first film had made.

In April 2025, production company Beijing Culture announced that a sequel, Creation of the Gods III, was in post-production.

== Plot ==
Jiang Ziya and Ji Fa gather civilians with the Kunlun immortals to defend Xiqi from the Shang dynasty army. The body of Yin Jiao—former crown prince of the Shang dynasty—is brought to Kunlun by Nezha and Yang Jian to be resurrected. Despite protests that resurrection will go against natural order, The Great Saint decides to resurrect Jiao. However, he finds that Jiao's soul is filled with hatred and vengeance against his father Yin Shou, causing him to absorb the Great Saint's power.

King Yin Shou, newly resurrected by the fox spirit, welcomes Grand Preceptor Wen Zhong and his armies home to Zhaoge after 10 years at war, alongside his generals Deng Chanyu and the Four Demonic Giants. They welcome Shou in the palace, who requests Zhong to capture Ji Fa and Ziya for the Investiture Scroll. Zhong declines and seeks retirement after a long hardship of protecting their dynasty but Chanyu requests to lead the mission, honoring her late father's wishes for her to become a renowned warrior.

Shou sends an emissary, ordering Ji Fa to commit suicide or risk an invasion of Xiqi, which Ji Fa refuses. Though his troops manage to fend off Chanyu's forces, they were overpowered and hastily retreat. Chanyu pursues Ji Fa, who barely escapes. Ji Fa reunites with Ziya who was captured by Shen Gongbao's crows, confessing that he ordered Xiqi's evacuation. Ziya then convinces him to continue fighting against Shou. Meanwhile, the fox spirit, severely weakened trying to restore Shou to full health, is unable to keep Daji's body fresh anymore. They search for a new vessel for the spirit, only to find that she is unable to leave Daji's body.

Upon Ji Fa and Ziya's return, Ziya suggests Ji Fa's forces to attack Chanyu's encampment later that night. Though they managed to kill one of the giants at Chanyu's camp, they were unable to defeat the remainder who assault the city the following day. Jiao, having absorbed the Great Saint's power, kills the remaining giants while Ji Fa rescues Chanyu from drowning and offers to surrender in exchange for Chanyu's forces sparing Xiqi and its inhabitants. Shou then coerces Zhong to reassume command of his forces.

Chanyu brings Ji Fa to Zhong, who refuses Ji Fa's plea to surrender and orders a massacre on Xiqi. Disgusted by Zhong's willingness to kill innocents, Chanyu helps Ji Fa escape imprisonment. Zhong pursues them, but Jiao holds him back, swearing to kill him if the invasion continues. Jiao reunites with Ji Fa, and Chanyu is accepted as a guest in Xiqi for saving Ji Fa, while the Tongtian Cult Leader grants Gongbao a gourd of Gu to kill Shou's remaining forces and resurrect them as obedient, undead soldiers.

Zhong cloaks Xiqi in darkness and summons floating mirrors that incapacitate anyone caught in their beams in a ritual; Chanyu's forces—now under Zhong's command—are protected by a sigil, allowing them to breach the city unimpeded, which Ziya recognises from a similar mark on Chanyu. Ziya realizes that Zhong is after him and the Scroll; Chanyu bargained with Zhong to bring Ziya and the Scroll in exchange for sparing Xiqi, allowing himself to be captured by Chanyu and brought to Zhong's altar. Ziya indicates Zhong's location to Ji Fa with a flare.

At the altar, Ji Fa prepares to kill Zhong as he completes the ritual to wipe out everyone affected by his mirrors; conversely, this will also eliminate everyone protected by his sigil—including Chanyu. After defeating Zhong's qilin, Chanyu helps Ji Fa kill Zhong, stopping the ritual and returning Ji Fa's allies to consciousness as Zhong's troops and Chanyu dissipate. Jiao travels alone back to Zhaoge to kill Shou, but is halted by the Tongtian Leader; Gongbao meets Zhong to collect his head according to the King's orders, leading an army of Gu soldiers onto Xiqi. Tongtian raises a brainwashed Jiao from a pool of mercury, presenting him to Shou and Daji as their puppet.

== Cast ==
- Yu Shi as Ji Fa, the lord of Xiqi
- Fei Xiang as King Yin Shou, leader of the Shang dynasty
- Chen Muchi as Prince Yin Jiao, Yin Shou's only son
- Huang Bo as Jiang Ziya, a former Kunlun immortal and keeper of the Fengshen Bang
- Ci Sha as Yang Jian, a Kunlun immortal
- Narana Erdyneeva as Daji, the concubine of Yin Shou, possessed by a fox spirit
- Nashi as Deng Chanyu, a general of the Shang army
- Wu Hsing-kuo as Wen Zhong, the Grand Preceptor of the Shang army

== Production ==
=== Development ===
Wuershan started work on the script for the Creation of the Gods trilogy in June 2014, during production of Mojin: The Lost Legend, which he felt had given him "significant experience in commercially-backed filmmaking and the use of necessary technologies for creating visually heavy blockbusters".

Creation of the Gods adapts the Chinese 16th-century historical fantasy novel Investiture of the Gods, which retells the overthrow of the Shang dynasty (1600–1046 BCE) and the founding of the Zhou dynasty (1046–256 BCE). Wuershan consulted anthropologists and historians during the research process, additionally including parts of other Chinese myths and classic texts: Wu Wang Fa Zhou Ping Hua (Chinese: 武王伐纣平话; lit. 'Story of King Wu's Campaign Against King Zhou'), the Book of Documents, and the Six Secret Teachings.

=== Filming ===
Filming of all three parts of the trilogy began in 2018 and was done back-to-back, spanning 18 months and involving almost 10,000 crew members working in technical departments. A 10,000-square meter sound stage was purpose-built for the film in Qingdao, Shandong.

There are more than 2,000 special effects shots in Demon Force that cover battle sequences and various Chinese mythological creatures, including the qilin, a hooved chimera; the jiaolong, a scaled dragon; and the huli jing, a shapeshifting fox spirit. Visual inspiration for the demon generals came from Wu Daozi's painting "The Eighty-Seven Immortals" (Chinese: 八十七神仙卷), and the character of Deng Chanyu was based on historical figure Fu Hao, a female Shang dynasty general.

Demon Force and the third film, Creation Under Heaven, were due for release in 2024 and 2025, respectively, but both were delayed by a year due to the complexity of their visual effects. During production, the film's English subtitle was changed from "Demonic Confrontation" to "Demon Force" at the suggestion of Taiwanese-American actor Fei Xiang.

Chinese media estimated the trilogy's production cost to be CN¥ 2.4 billion; including marketing and publicity expenses, the total cost was CN¥ 3 billion.

== Music ==
The film's soundtrack was composed by Gordy Haab, returning from the first film, in collaboration with Tian Mi.

== Release ==
=== Theatrical ===
Creation of the Gods II: Demon Force received a limited IMAX release starting 29 January 2025 in China and North America. It was followed by a wide release on 31 January in China, North America, Australia, France, and Italy.

The film has an aspect ratio of 2.39:1 in regular formats, while IMAX screenings feature an expanded aspect ratio of 1.90:1.

== Reception ==
=== Box office ===
On its first day of release, Creation of the Gods II earned $65.78 million in China and $451,899 in the United States. By the end of its opening weekend, the film had grossed $123.72 million in China and $1.29 million in the US, more than double the box office of Creation of the Gods I over the same period ($53.7 million).

The film ultimately grossed $168.95 million in China, earning less than half of the first part's $369 million. It trailed two other films that were also released on Chinese New Year: Ne Zha 2 (which became the highest-grossing non-English film in history) and Detective Chinatown 1900.

=== Critical response ===
Creation of the Gods II received generally positive reviews from critics. Writing for RogerEbert.com, Simon Abrams gave it three out of four stars, saying, "[It's] refreshing to see a glossy, effects-driven fantasy adventure that not only delivers a wealth of action-intensive set pieces and battle sequences, but also develops those crowd-pleasing set pieces so that they’re consistently impressive. ... Would-be blockbusters always seem too big to fail, but very few actually pull off as much as this one does."

James Marsh of the South China Morning Post gave it four out of five stars, writing, "While it must be conceded that the alluring sensuality of the first film is sorely missed here, Wuershan delivers another rollicking fantasy adventure, bursting with vividly drawn characters, crackling set pieces and eye-popping visual effects ... a 16th century novel has spawned one of the most genuinely enthralling Chinese cinematic sagas in recent memory."

In FilmInk, Cain Noble-Davies gave the film an eight out of ten, comparing its scale to the Lord of the Rings trilogy: "Practical effects make up the heft of the visuals here, from the densely populated set pieces, to the labyrinthian etchings of the costumes, to the sheer scale of the warfare scenes ... [though] there’s plenty of room for quieter moments and even humorous asides. That, and the underlying philosophical tone of the source material, with the main conflict essentially serving as a large-scale duel of praxis between Confucianism and Taoism, which helps to keep the presence of gods, demons, and mystical immortals from being entirely surface-level."

After the film's release, its character designs and changes from the original novel attracted widespread online discussion and created many internet memes. Much of the online discussion focused on the film's portrayals of the two sect leaders, Yuanshi Tianzun and Tongtian Jiaozhu. Audiences noted that Tongtian Jiaozhu's appearance was very different from traditional Chinese depictions. Many netizens compared his design to Western fictional villains such as Lord Voldemort and Gargamel. Similarly, the film's portrayal of Yuanshi Tianzun difference from the original novel. While the novel presents him as a powerful and supreme deity, the film shows him in a weakened state after losing much of his power, with his hair and beard turning from black to white as a visual sign of his decline.
