= Pingliang =

Pingliang 平凉市
- Prefecture-level city
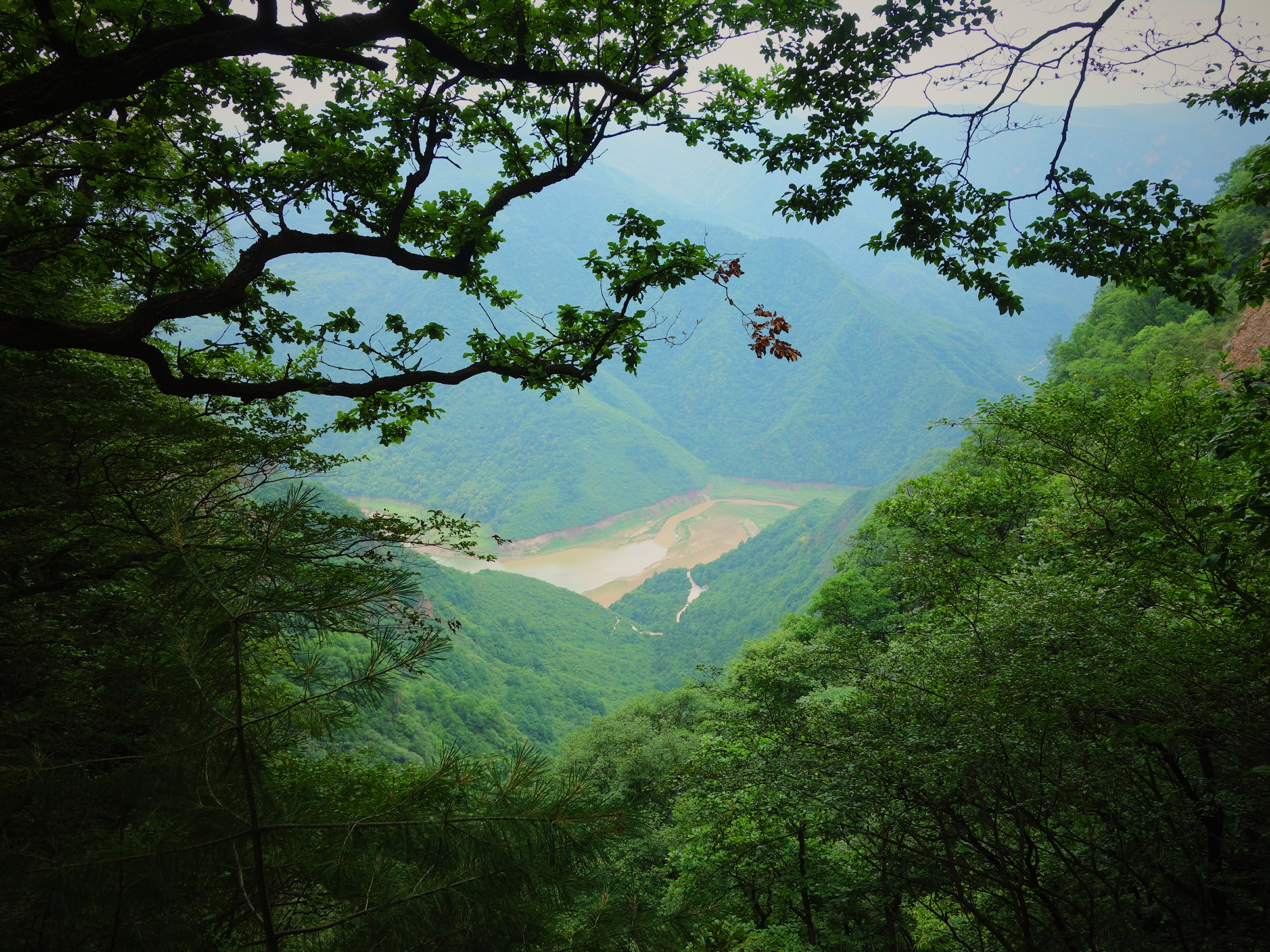
- The Kongtong Mountains in Pingliang

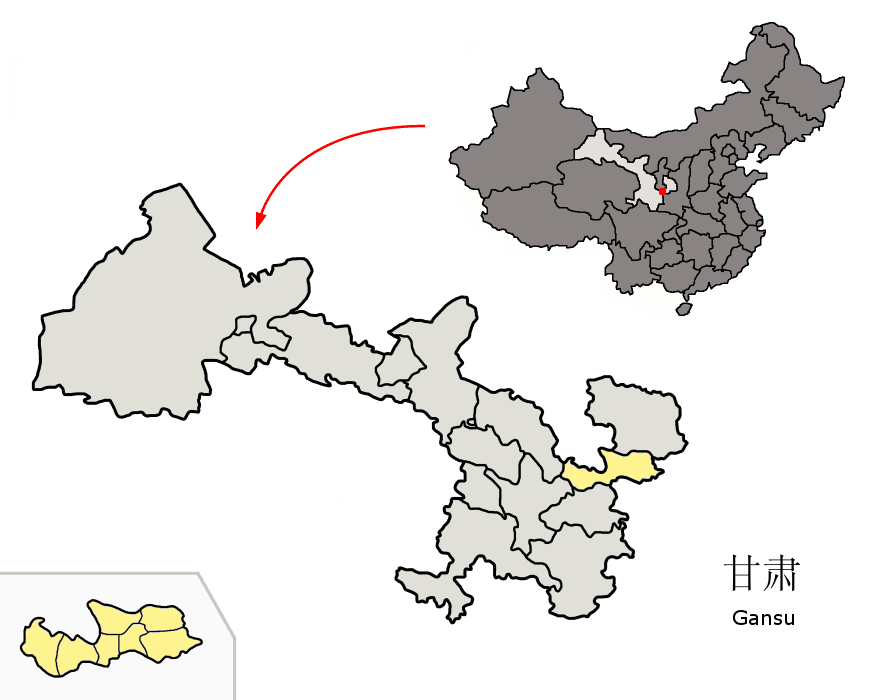
- Location of Pingliang City jurisdiction in Gansu
- Coordinates (Pingliang municipal government): 35°32′33″N 106°39′54″E
- Country: People's Republic of China
- Province: Gansu
- Municipal seat: Kongtong District

Area
  - Prefecture-level city: 11,196.71 km^{2} (4,323.07 sq mi)
- Elevation: 1,398 m (4,587 ft)
- Highest elevation: 2,857 m (9,373 ft)
- Lowest elevation: 890 m (2,920 ft)

Population (2020)
  - Prefecture-level city: 1,848,607
  - Density: 165.1027/km^{2} (427.6140/sq mi)
  - Metro: 871,600

GDP
  - Prefecture-level city: CN¥ 34.8 billion US$ 5.6 billion
  - Per capita: CN¥ 16,595; US$ 2,664
- Time zone: UTC+8 (China Standard)
- Postal code: 744000
- Area code: 0933
- ISO 3166 code: CN-GS-08
- Licence plate prefixes: 甘L
- Website: www.pingliang.gov.cn

Pingliang (simplified Chinese: 平凉; traditional Chinese: 平涼; pinyin: Píngliàng; lit. 'Pacify Liang') is a prefecture-level city in eastern Gansu province, China, bordering Shaanxi province to the south and east and the Ningxia Hui Autonomous Region to the north. The city was established in 376 AD. It has a residential population of 2,125,300 in 2019. The urban population is almost 900,000.

Pingliang is well known for the nearby Kongtong Mountains, which are sacred to Taoism and location of the mythical meeting place of the Yellow Emperor and Guangchengzi, an immortal.

The Book of Sui and Tongdian record that the Ashina tribe who founded the First Turkic Khaganate (also known as Göktürk Khaganate) were from Pingliang.

== List of divisions ==
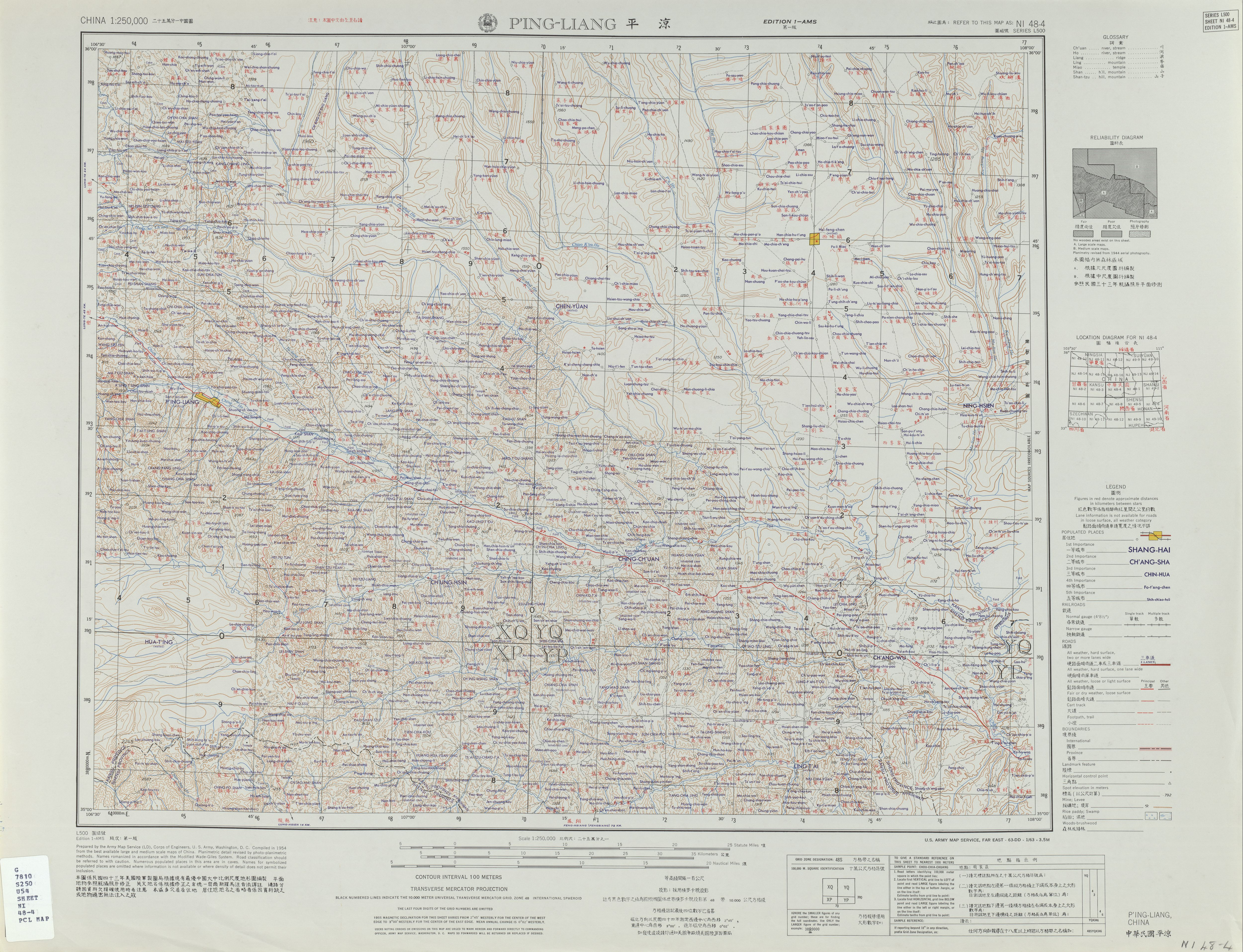
Map including Pingliang (labeled as P'ING-LIANG (walled) 平涼) (AMS, 1954)

Map
Name	Chinese	Hanyu Pinyin	Population (2010)	Area (km²)	Density (/km²)
Kongtong District	崆峒区	Kōngtóng Qū	504,848	1,936	261
Huating City	华亭市	Huátíng Shì	189,333	1,183	160
Jingchuan County	泾川县	Jīngchuān Xiàn	281,145	1,409	200
Lingtai County	灵台县	Língtái Xiàn	183,937	2,038	88
Chongxin County	崇信县	Chóngxìn Xiàn	102,116	852	120
Zhuanglang County	庄浪县	Zhuānglàng Xiàn	382,827	1,558	246
Jingning County	静宁县	Jìngníng Xiàn	423,827	2,193	193

== Geography and climate ==
Pingliang ranges in latitude from 34° 54' to 35° 46' N and in longitude from 105° 20' to 107° 51' E. Bordering prefecture-level cities are Xianyang (Shaanxi) to the east, Baoji (Shaanxi) and Tianshui to the south, Dingxi and Baiyin to the west, and Guyuan (Ningxia) and Qingyang to the north. It is located on the Loess Plateau with elevations ranging from 890 to 2,957 metres (2,920 to 9,701 ft); the city proper itself is at an elevation of around 1,400 m (4,590 ft).

Due to its elevation of around 1,400 m (4,590 ft), Pingliang has a monsoon-influenced, four-season, humid continental climate (Köppen Dwb), with cold but dry winters, and warm and humid summers. The monthly 24-hour average temperature ranges from −4.2 °C (24.4 °F) in January to 21.5 °C (70.7 °F) in July. Much of the annual rainfall occurs from June to September, and the annual mean temperature is 9.28 °C (48.7 °F). With monthly percent possible sunshine ranging from 46% in September to 65% in December, the city receives 2,381 hours of bright sunshine annually.

Climate data for Pingliang (Kongtong District), elevation 1,347 m (4,419 ft), (1991–2020 normals, extremes 1951–present)
Month	Jan	Feb	Mar	Apr	May	Jun	Jul	Aug	Sep	Oct	Nov	Dec	Year
Record high °C (°F)	17.3 (63.1)	23.4 (74.1)	28.4 (83.1)	32.6 (90.7)	33.4 (92.1)	35.9 (96.6)	36.0 (96.8)	35.0 (95.0)	33.8 (92.8)	27.8 (82.0)	22.8 (73.0)	17.9 (64.2)	36.0 (96.8)
Mean daily maximum °C (°F)	2.5 (36.5)	6.1 (43.0)	12.0 (53.6)	18.6 (65.5)	22.9 (73.2)	26.7 (80.1)	27.8 (82.0)	26.1 (79.0)	21.0 (69.8)	15.6 (60.1)	9.9 (49.8)	4.1 (39.4)	16.1 (61.0)
Daily mean °C (°F)	−4.1 (24.6)	−0.4 (31.3)	5.2 (41.4)	11.5 (52.7)	16.1 (61.0)	20.1 (68.2)	21.9 (71.4)	20.3 (68.5)	15.4 (59.7)	9.4 (48.9)	3.2 (37.8)	−2.4 (27.7)	9.7 (49.4)
Mean daily minimum °C (°F)	−8.7 (16.3)	−5.1 (22.8)	0.0 (32.0)	5.5 (41.9)	9.8 (49.6)	13.9 (57.0)	16.7 (62.1)	15.8 (60.4)	11.2 (52.2)	4.9 (40.8)	−1.5 (29.3)	−6.9 (19.6)	4.6 (40.3)
Record low °C (°F)	−22.5 (−8.5)	−19.1 (−2.4)	−15.2 (4.6)	−8.8 (16.2)	−1.5 (29.3)	4.3 (39.7)	8.7 (47.7)	5.5 (41.9)	−0.7 (30.7)	−7.9 (17.8)	−16.6 (2.1)	−24.3 (−11.7)	−24.3 (−11.7)
Average precipitation mm (inches)	4.0 (0.16)	5.9 (0.23)	13.1 (0.52)	27.4 (1.08)	44.4 (1.75)	67.2 (2.65)	103.8 (4.09)	93.6 (3.69)	77.5 (3.05)	38.7 (1.52)	8.8 (0.35)	2.0 (0.08)	486.4 (19.17)
Average precipitation days (≥ 1.0 mm)	4.2	5.3	6.3	6.8	8.9	9.8	12.0	12.3	11.7	8.6	4.7	2.5	93.1
Average snowy days	6.2	7.6	5.7	1.2	0	0	0	0	0	0	0.9	4.0	25.6
Average relative humidity (%)	54	56	54	52	56	61	70	75	78	74	64	57	63
Mean monthly sunshine hours	189.9	167.1	196.3	220.8	239.4	236.0	225.6	208.9	157.9	170.2	182.7	191.1	2,385.9
Percentage possible sunshine	61	54	53	56	55	54	51	51	43	49	60	63	54
Source: China Meteorological Administration

== Transport ==
- G22 Qingdao–Lanzhou Expressway, which motorists can take to reach the south of neighbouring Ningxia and eventually Lanzhou, the capital of Gansu
- China National Highway 312, which motorists can take to reach Xi'an

== Notable residents ==
- Zhao Jiping, film composer (b. 1945)

== Notable births ==
Pingliang is the birthplace of Huangfu Mi, who wrote the first book on acupuncture, of novelist Niu Sengru, and of Southern Song dynasty generals Wu Jie (吴玠) and Wu Lin.
