= Kongtong, Pingliang =

Kongtong 崆峒区
- District
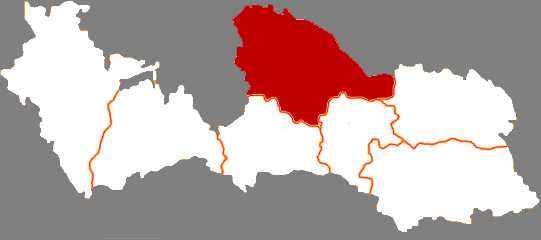
- Kongtong in Pingliang

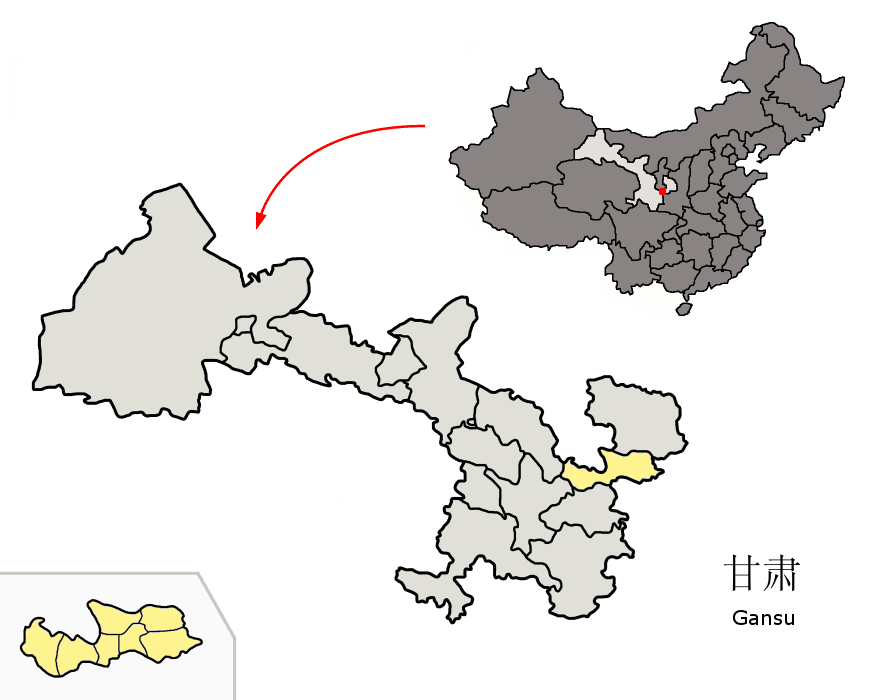
- Pingliang in Gansu

- Location in Gansu
- Coordinates: 35°32′33″N 106°40′29″E
- Country: China
- Province: Gansu
- Prefecture-level city: Pingliang
- District seat: Xijiao Subdistrict

Area
  - Total: 1,936 km^{2} (747 sq mi)
- Highest elevation: 2,240 m (7,350 ft)
- Lowest elevation: 1,120 m (3,670 ft)

Population (2020 census)
  - Total: 504,265
  - Density: 260.5/km^{2} (674.6/sq mi)
- Time zone: UTC+8 (China Standard)
- Postal code: 744000
- Website: www.kongtong.gov.cn

Kongtong (Chinese: 崆峒; pinyin: Kōngtóng) is a district of the city of Pingliang, Gansu province, China, bordering Ningxia to the northwest. It is named after the Kongtong Mountains. Kongtong is the seat of Pingliang city's government. At the start of 2021 the population was 534,800, 65% living in urban areas.

== Geography ==
The district is traversed by the Jinghe River and most of the area has a loess plateau landscape. The elevation ranges from 1,120 to 2,240 m.

== Demographics ==
As of the 2010 census the total population of Kongtong district was 504,848. At the start of 2021 the population was 534,800, 65% living in urban areas.

Minority share of population as of the 2010 census
Ethnic group	Population	Population share
Han	375,271	74.3 %
Hui	129,257	25.6 %
Tibetan	46	0.009
Mongolian	31	0.006
Total	504,848	100 %

== Climate ==
Climate data for Kongtong (1991–2016 normals, extremes 1981–2010)
Month	Jan	Feb	Mar	Apr	May	Jun	Jul	Aug	Sep	Oct	Nov	Dec	Year
Record high °C (°F)	15.1 (59.2)	23.4 (74.1)	28.4 (83.1)	32.6 (90.7)	33.4 (92.1)	35.9 (96.6)	36.0 (96.8)	33.8 (92.8)	33.8 (92.8)	27.8 (82.0)	22.8 (73.0)	17.9 (64.2)	36.0 (96.8)
Mean daily maximum °C (°F)	2.5 (36.5)	6.1 (43.0)	12.0 (53.6)	18.6 (65.5)	22.9 (73.2)	26.7 (80.1)	27.8 (82.0)	26.1 (79.0)	21.0 (69.8)	15.6 (60.1)	9.9 (49.8)	4.1 (39.4)	16.1 (61.0)
Daily mean °C (°F)	−4.1 (24.6)	−0.4 (31.3)	5.2 (41.4)	11.5 (52.7)	16.1 (61.0)	20.1 (68.2)	21.9 (71.4)	20.3 (68.5)	15.4 (59.7)	9.4 (48.9)	3.2 (37.8)	−2.4 (27.7)	9.7 (49.4)
Mean daily minimum °C (°F)	−8.7 (16.3)	−5.1 (22.8)	0.0 (32.0)	5.5 (41.9)	9.8 (49.6)	13.9 (57.0)	16.7 (62.1)	15.8 (60.4)	11.2 (52.2)	4.9 (40.8)	−1.5 (29.3)	−6.9 (19.6)	4.6 (40.3)
Record low °C (°F)	−18.7 (−1.7)	−17.8 (0.0)	−13.0 (8.6)	−5.6 (21.9)	−1.5 (29.3)	5.2 (41.4)	9.5 (49.1)	7.5 (45.5)	0.4 (32.7)	−7.9 (17.8)	−15.7 (3.7)	−22.7 (−8.9)	−22.7 (−8.9)
Average precipitation mm (inches)	4.0 (0.16)	5.9 (0.23)	13.1 (0.52)	27.4 (1.08)	44.4 (1.75)	67.2 (2.65)	103.8 (4.09)	93.6 (3.69)	77.5 (3.05)	38.7 (1.52)	8.8 (0.35)	2.0 (0.08)	486.4 (19.17)
Average precipitation days (≥ 0.1 mm)	4.2	5.3	6.3	6.8	8.9	9.8	12.0	12.3	11.7	8.6	4.7	2.5	93.1
Average snowy days	6.2	7.6	5.7	1.2	0	0	0	0	0	0.9	4.0	5.3	30.9
Average relative humidity (%)	54	56	54	52	56	61	70	75	78	74	64	57	63
Mean monthly sunshine hours	189.9	167.1	196.3	220.8	239.4	236.0	225.6	208.9	157.9	170.2	182.7	191.1	2,385.9
Percentage possible sunshine	61	54	53	56	55	54	51	51	43	49	60	63	54
Source: China Meteorological Administration

== Economy ==
The local industry relies strongly on coal mining and processing.

== Administrative divisions ==
Kongtong District is subdivided into 3 subdistricts, 7 towns, 10 townships and 1 other.

Subdistricts

- Dongguan Subdistrict (东关街道)
- Zhongjie Subdistrict (中街街道)
- Xijiao Subdistrict (西郊街道)

Towns

- Kongtong (崆峒镇)
- Baishui (白水镇)
- Caofeng (草峰镇)
- Anguo (安国镇)
- Liuhu (柳湖镇)
- Sishilipu (四十里铺镇)
- Huasuo (花所镇)

Townships

- Suoluo Township (索罗乡)
- Xianglian Township (香莲乡)
- Xiyang Township (西阳乡)
- Daqin Township (大秦乡)
- Baimiao Township (白庙乡)
- Zhaihe Township (寨河乡)
- Dazhai Township (大寨乡)
- Shangyang Township (上杨乡)
- Mawu Township (麻武乡)
- Xiamen Township (峡门乡)

Others

- Pingliang Kongtong Mountain Scenic Area Management Committee (平凉崆峒山大景区管理委员会)

== See also ==
- List of administrative divisions of Gansu
