= Gao Lanying =

Character from Investiture of the Gods

Gao Lanying

Gao Lanying (simplified Chinese: 高兰英; traditional Chinese: 高蘭英; pinyin: Gāo Lányīng) is a character in the Chinese Ming dynasty novel Investiture of the Gods (Fengshen Yanyi). She is the wife of Zhang Kui, a Shang general who defends the city of Mianchi against the army of King Wu of Zhou. She fights with two swords and uses a red gourd containing 49 Solar Needles (太阳神针), which can blind her enemies.

== Role in the novel ==
Gao Lanying and her husband, Zhang Kui, defend Mianchi against the Zhou army. She fights with two swords and carries a red gourd containing 49 Solar Needles (太阳神针), which can blind her enemies. When five Zhou generals fight Zhang Kui, Gao Lanying blinds three of them with her needles, allowing her husband to kill them.

After Zhang Kui captures Yang Jian, Gao Lanying tries to stop his magic by using the blood of a black chicken and a black dog, mixed with urine and excrement. She places a talisman on him and cuts off his head, but Yang Jian survives through his magic. His magic causes Zhang Kui's mother to die instead.

When Zhang Kui considers leaving Mianchi, Gao Lanying urges him to stay and defend the city. She later fights Deng Chanyu, who injures her face with a Five-Colored Stone. After Zhang Kui kills Tu Xingsun, Deng Chanyu returns to avenge her husband. Gao Lanying blinds Deng Chanyu with her Solar Needles and kills her with a sword.

During the final attack on Mianchi, Gao Lanying remains in the city while Zhang Kui goes out to fight the Zhou army. She fights Nezha but is unable to use her Solar Needles before he strikes her with his Qiankun Circle and kills her with his spear.

After her death, Jiang Ziya names her the Taohua Star (Chinese: 桃花星; lit. 'Peach Blossom Star') during the investiture of the gods. Her husband is named the Qisha Star (七杀星; Seven Killings Star).

== In traditional art ==
Gao Lanying is shown in traditional Taiwanese woodcarvings based on Investiture of the Gods. In a 2011 master's thesis, Tsai Yu-wen described Gao Lanying as a female warrior holding a gourd and shown on the same side as Zhang Kui. Tsai also studied a woodcarving at Renwu Temple in Chiayi, Taiwan, showing the battle at Mianchi. The carving shows Gao Lanying and Zhang Kui fighting the Zhou forces.

The thesis also examines carvings at other temples, where Gao Lanying appears with Zhang Kui, Nezha, Yang Jian and other characters from the novel.

== Folk religion ==
In Chinese religion, Gao Lanying is known as the Kitchen Grandmother (灶王奶奶), while Zhang Kui is known as the Kitchen God (灶王爷). A 2021 article in Fengci yu Youmo describes them as one of the couples named in folk stories about the Kitchen God and his wife.
