= Yin Jiao =

Yin Jiao may refer to:

- Yin Kaishan, a general and officer in Sui and Tang dynasties of China.
- Yin Jiao, a deity of Tai Sui and a character in Investiture of the Gods
