= Deng Chanyu =

Fictional character in the novel Fengshen Yanyi

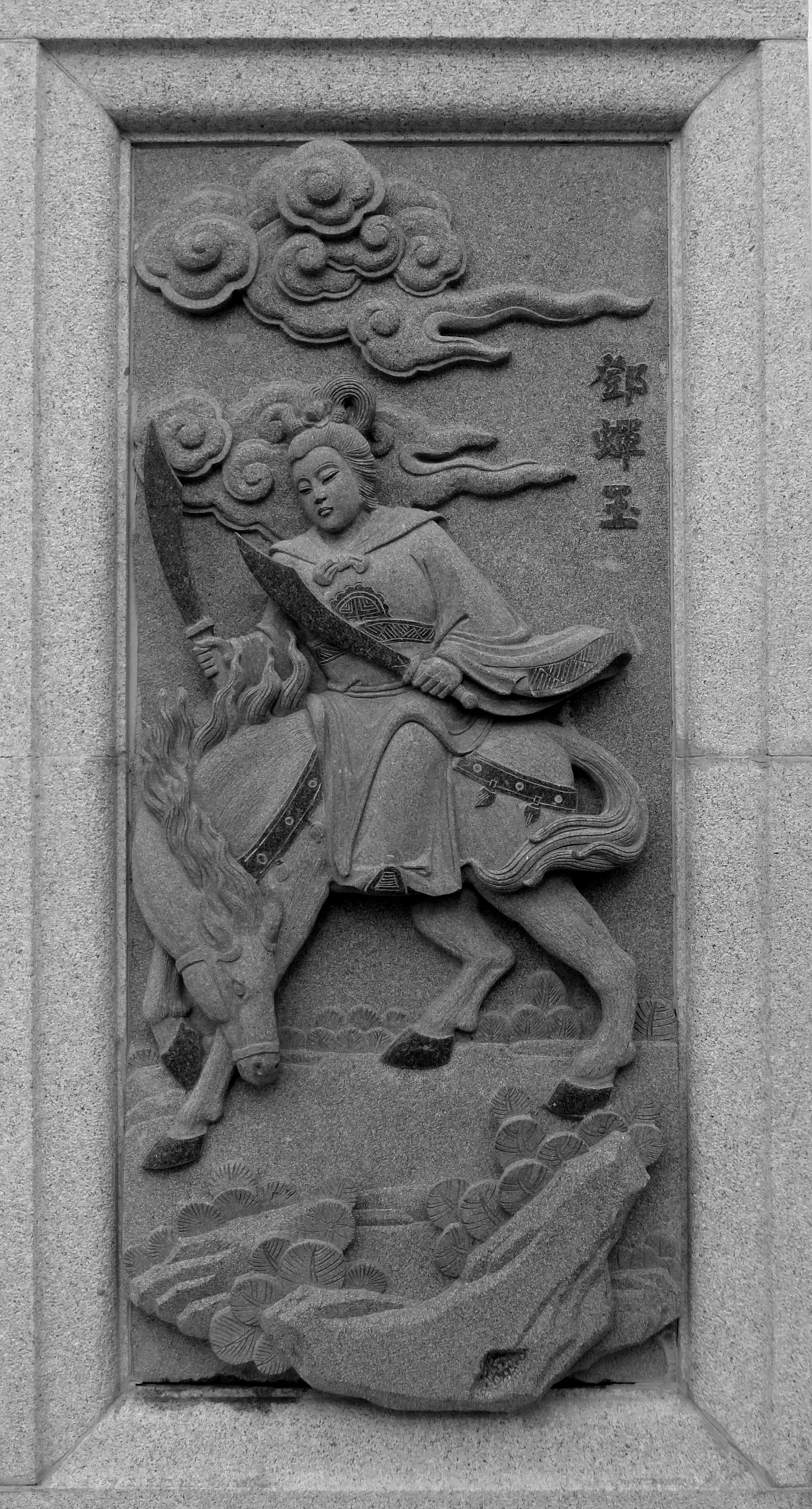
Deng Chanyu

Deng Chanyu (Chinese: 鄧嬋玉) is a character in the classic Chinese novel Fengshen Yanyi. The daughter of the Shang dynasty commander Deng Jiugong, she is a skilled female warrior who uses the “Five-Light Stone” (五光石) as her weapon. After her death, she is deified as the Goddess of the Six Harmonies Stars (六合星君).

== In Fengshen Yanyi ==
Deng Chanyu was the daughter of Deng Jiugong, a Shang general stationed at Three Mountains Pass. She was skilled in sword fighting and could throw magical golden stones that injured her opponents. She carried a longsword and fought alongside her father during the Shang campaign against West Qi. After Deng Jiugong was badly injured in the first attack, Deng Chanyu went to the city gates the next day and challenged the Zhou forces. Nezha and Huang Tianhua accepted her challenge, but she defeated both of them with her five-colored stones. On the third day, she fought Dragon Beard Tiger and defeated him, but Yang Jian then joined the fight. Her stones had no effect on him, so Yang Jian ordered his Celestial Hound to bite her neck, forcing her to return to her camp.

Deng Chanyu and her father were later treated by Earth Traveler Sun, a young soldier with magical medicines and supernatural abilities. After he captured Nezha and Huang Tianhua, he was invited to a banquet. After drinking for several hours, Deng Jiugong promised his daughter in marriage to Earth Traveler Sun if he could capture West Qi. Earth Traveler Sun took the promise seriously and tried to capture the city alone, but Yang Jian used his ability to change his appearance to deceive and capture him.

During the negotiations that followed, Deng Jiugong remembered his promise. Jiang Ziya told him that the marriage was destined to take place. Angry with Jiang Ziya, Deng Jiugong decided to use the marriage as a trap to kill him. He pretended to accept the marriage and prepared an ambush. Jiang Ziya discovered the plan and prepared an ambush of his own, ordering Earth Traveler Sun to capture Deng Chanyu when he heard the cannon signal for Deng Jiugong's attack. The plan succeeded, and Deng Chanyu was captured while Deng Jiugong's army was badly weakened.

Deng Chanyu was unhappy about the marriage but eventually agreed because of her father's wishes. After the marriage, she asked Jiang Ziya for permission to visit her father and persuade him to surrender. Jiang Ziya agreed and sent Zhou soldiers with her to the Shang camp. Deng Chanyu told her father about the marriage and argued that the expected Shang reinforcements would not arrive in time. Deng Jiugong accepted her argument and surrendered to West Qi. He and Deng Chanyu then pledged loyalty to King Wu.

Deng Chanyu later fought alongside her husband against the Shang forces. During a battle with Su Hu's general Zheng Lun, Earth Traveler Sun was disabled by Zheng Lun's magical attack, but Deng Chanyu escaped and injured Zheng Lun with one of her magical stones. She continued to fight for the Zhou army until she was captured by General Zhang Kui and his wife, Gao Lanying. Gao Lanying killed her, after which Nezha killed Gao Lanying in battle. When Jiang Ziya later assigned the divine offices, Deng Chanyu was appointed Goddess of the Six Harmonies Stars (六合星).

== In media ==
Deng Chanyu appears in the 2025 film Creation of the Gods II: Demon Force, played by Nashi. Director Wuershan based her character partly on Fu Hao, a Shang dynasty queen and military commander. The film crew also visited Fu Hao's tomb in Henan while preparing for the film.

The film changes Deng Chanyu's story from the novel. Her marriage to Tu Xingsun is left out. Instead, she is a Shang general who begins to question King Zhou after learning of his order to kill civilians. Gong Jinping and Leng Wenqi compare this with the novel, where her marriage is arranged by others. They see the film version as a woman who makes her own choices and puts the lives of the people before her duty to the king.
