= Creation of the Gods I: Kingdom of Storms =

2023 fantasy film directed by Wuershan

- Theatrical release poster
- Traditional Chinese: 封神第一部：朝歌風雲
- Simplified Chinese: 封神第一部：朝歌风云
- Directed by: Wuershan
- Written by: Ran Ping; Ran Jianan; Wuershan; Cao Sheng
- Based on: Investiture of the Gods by Xu Zhonglin
- Produced by: Du Yang; Wuershan; William Kong; Barrie M. Osborne
- Starring: Fei Xiang; Li Xuejian; Huang Bo; Yu Shi; Chen Muchi; Narana Erdyneeva; Xia Yu
- Cinematography: Wang Yu
- Edited by: Cheung Ka-Fai; Du Yuan; Huang Shuo
- Music by: Gordy Haab
- Production companies: Tencent Pictures; Beijing Jingxi Culture & Tourism; Mongketengri Pictures; Dongyang Mongketengri Film & TV Production; Tianjin Maoyan Weiying Culture Media; Shanghai Tencent Penguin Pictures; Qingdao Haifa Pictures
- Distributed by: Beijing Jingxi Culture & Tourism; Huaxia Film Distribution
- Release date: July 20, 2023 (China)
- Running time: 148 minutes
- Country: China
- Language: Mandarin
- Budget: ¥800 million ($110.3 million)
- Box office: $369.1 million

Creation of the Gods I: Kingdom of Storms (Chinese: 封神第一部：朝歌风云) is a 2023 Chinese epic fantasy film directed by Wuershan. The first film in the Creation of the Gods trilogy, adapted from the 16th-century fantasy novel Investiture of the Gods written by the Ming dynasty author Xu Zhonglin, it features an ensemble cast, including Fei Xiang, Li Xuejian, Huang Bo, Yu Shi, Chen Muchi, Narana Erdyneeva, and Xia Yu. The first film mainly narrates the fantastic and fictitious version of the political fallout following the ascension of the last king of Shang dynasty.

The film was released in China on July 20, 2023. As of January 2025, it is the 28th highest-grossing film ever in China, and the trilogy is considered to be the most ambitious and expensive Chinese production ever made. It won several accolades, including the 2023 Golden Rooster Award for Best Picture, and was nominated for the 2023 Golden Deer Award. Following its important success in its origin country, it was released in the USA by Well Go USA on September 22, 2023 and later internationally. It received mixed reviews from critics.

A sequel, Creation of the Gods II: Demon Force, released on January 29, 2025 (Chinese New Year), focuses on Xiqi's defense against Shang's attack. The final film in the trilogy, Creation Under Heaven, will feature Xiqi's counterattack, eventual victory and establishment of the Zhou dynasty.

== Plot ==
Lord Su Hu of Jizhou rebels against the Shang dynasty. The Shang army, led by Prince Yin Shou, defeats the rebels. Shou and his hostage-sons break through rebel defenses and kill Su. Su Daji, the daughter of Su Hu, commits suicide but then emerges alive and is captured, with the Shang army returning home.

King Di Yi is killed during the victory feast by a suddenly deranged Crown Prince Qi – Shou's brother; Qi is then accidentally killed by Ji Fa, a hostage-son from the western state of Xiqi. Shou becomes king. Divination during the coronation finds the dynasty to be cursed by the patri-regicide. Shou promises his own ritual suicide to placate the Heavens and lift the curse.

Meanwhile, the Immortals of Kunlun consider giving Shou the Investiture Scroll, which can restore order and save the world from the curse. Jiang Ziya, a monk and a disciple of Yuanshi Tianzun, volunteers to deliver the scroll but realizes that Shou, a tyrant, should not have such power. Ziya leaves with the scroll and is joined by nephew-disciples Nezha and Yang Jian. They are pursued by Shen Gongbao, an alchemist and Ziya's rival, and Crown Prince Yin Jiao and Ji Fa. They encounter Ji Chang, Ji Fa's father and the Duke of the West, who is travelling to the capital Zhaoge to greet the new king. Chang finds an infant demon, whom he names Lei Zhenzi, and sends Zhenzi to Kunlun on Ziya's advice.

Chang and the other three dukes (of the East, North and South) meet secretly; they are skeptical of the legitimacy of Shou's ascension. The meeting is discovered by royal guards. Shou orders the dukes to be executed for high treason by their hostage-sons. Chong Yingbiao, son of the Duke of the North, complies without hesitation. E Shun, son of the Duke of the South, instead attacks Shou, who kills them both. The Duke of the East kills himself on the sword of Jiang Wenhuan, his son. Ji Fa argues that Chang would suffer greater humiliation by making a public confession of faking divination than by being executed; Chang is sent to the dungeon. Bo Yikao, Chang's eldest son, attempts to release Chang from prison and offers to replace his father in prison. Bo Yikao was killed, minced and made into meat pies which Shou fed to Chang. On his eldest son's sacrifice, Chang confesses to treason to save Ji Fa, and is publicly paraded and humiliated.

Meanwhile, Shou's son, Yin Jiao, finds and pursues a man-eating fox spirit in the palace, discovering it to be possessing the body of Su Daji. Shou accuses Jiao of attempted patricide to project Daji, now the favored consort. Daji killed Queen Jiang after the latter attempts to kill Daji. In a later attempt to kill Daji, Jiao was injured and escapes the palace with Ji Fa's help. Jiao, Ziya and High Priest Bi Gan, Shou's uncle, agree to expose the spirit to Shou. Bi Gan sacrifices his magical heart to evict the fox spirit from Daji's body, but Shou refuses to kill it, claiming it knows his ambition and is helping him to achieve it. The spirit was imprisoned by Tang of Shang but it was accidentally released by Shou during the battle of Jizhou. The spirit had charmed Qi to kill his father, paving the way for Shou to become the king. Jiao, who was hidden by Bi Gan, is arrested and sentenced to death. Shou ordered Ji Fa to kill his father, Ji Chang, but Ji Fa faked his father's death by showing the bagged 'head' to Shou. Chang was later rescued by Lei Zhenzi and returned to Xiqi.

Ji Fa and the hostage-sons from Xiqi rebel during Jiao's execution. Chong Yingbiao decapitates Jiao, whose head and body are retrieved by Nezha and Yang Jian. Ji Fa fights and seriously wounds Shou before fleeing the city with Ziya. Ziya and the scroll are pursued by two Taotie statues possessed by Shen Gongbao. Ji Fa exchanges clothing with Ziya, draws the statues away, trapping one and escaping the other after jumping off a cliff into a river. He then rides back to Xiqi. Gongbao sends a swarm of crows against Ziya.

The fox spirit - still possessing Daji's body - resuscitates Shou; Ziya fishes alone on Wei River and notices Gongbao's crows; Wen Zhong, Grand Preceptor of the Shang dynasty who has been away at war for ten years, returns to the capital along with his generals including the Four Demonic Giants.

== Cast ==
- Yu Shi as Ji Fa — the second son of Ji Chang and the future leader of the Xizhou, who served as a hostage-son and royal guard of Yin Shou, also the narrator of the story
- Fei Xiang as King Yin Shou — the second prince and later King of the Shang dynasty
- Li Xuejian as Duke Ji Chang — the lord of Xiqi and Duke of the West, and father of Ji Fa
- Huang Bo as Jiang Ziya — a Kunlun monk who is entrusted the Investiture Scroll, later becomes the chief strategist of Xiqi
- Narana Erdyneeva as Consort Su Daji — the concubine of Yin Shou, whose body is possessed by a nine-tailed fox
- Chen Muchi as Prince Yin Jiao — Yin Shou's only son and crown prince of Shang dynasty
- Xia Yu as Shen Gongbao — a rival monk to Jiang Ziya who came to serve King Shou as a magical strategist
- Yuan Quan as Queen Jiang — Yin Shou's wife and queen consort, and Yin Jiao's mother
- Wang Luoyong as Bi Gan — Yin Shou's uncle and the High Priest of Shang dynasty
- Yang Le as Bo Yikao — the eldest son and heir of Ji Chang, and brother to Ji Fa
- Ci Sha as Yang Jian — a nephew-disciple to Jiang Ziya, who specializes in water magics
- Wu Yafan as Nezha — a nephew-disciple to Jiang Ziya, who specializes in fire magics
- Hou Wenyuan as Chong Yingbiao — the hostage-son of the Duke of the North, and fellow royal guard and bitter rival to Ji Fa
- Huang Xiyan as Jiang Wenhuan — the hostage-son of the Duke of the East, a fellow royal guard to Ji Fa
- Li Yunrui as E Shun — the hostage-son of the Duke of the South, a fellow royal guard to Ji Fa
- Xu Huanshan as King Yi — Yin Shou's estranged royal father
- Gao Shuguang as Yin Qi — Yin Shou's estranged elder brother and the previous crown prince of Shang dynasty

== Production ==
=== Development ===
The project officially began in June 2014.

In initial planning meetings, anthropologists, historians, and folklore experts discussed the fundamental elements of the Creation of the Gods story that could resonate with reality and maintain relevance in contemporary society. The director eventually concluded that the themes he wished to convey included the enduring struggle between good and evil and the development of heroes, believing that these narratives «will never lose their significance and relevance».

=== Pre-production ===
During pre-production, which began in September 2016, the director went to America and New Zealand to visit notable special effects companies and post-production companies, including Industrial Light & Magic, Weta Digital, Weta Workshop and Park Road Post Production. Wuershan also consulted creative experiences with producers such as Peter Jackson, Barrie M. Osborne, and Grant Hill, and finally formed an international production team.

=== Casting ===
The cast of Kingdom of Storms was selected from more than 1,400 people from 15,000 global auditions, and then interviewed by the director Wuershan himself, and finally selected more than 20 young actors to enter the performance camp for six months of training.

The training camp is based on the “Theory of Liuyi (Six Skills)” of "manners, music, shooting, rein, books and mathematics", offering courses such as acting, martial arts, equestrian, shooting, drum music, Chinese cultural history, body shaping, film viewing and analysis, and so on. And they were supplied by scientific nutrition, the training camp effectively builds actors' strong bodies and muscle lines in line with ancient warriors' bodies.

Yu Shi, who plays Ji Fa, was not a trained actor, and participated in the training and shooting of the “Creation of the Gods I: Kingdom of Storms” is the beginning for Yu Shi as an actor. In the cast, he received comprehensive training in performance, equestrian, movement, etiquette, drum music, cultural history, etc. The shots of Ji Fa riding a horse and turning around and shooting, and riding his horses across the fire wall were all acted by him without substitute. Ci Sha had to copy lines from the Dao De Jing as part of his own training.

Wuershan said, “All the difficult equestrian moves are done by the actors themselves. They started training from scratch for 6 months. It is amazing to be able to complete such a complicated performance."

=== Filming ===
Principal photography for the film started on September 9, 2018, and took place in Qingdao, Shandong, primarily in the studios of the Oriental Movie Metropolis.

The film features 2,400 shots, including 1,800 VFX shots, and was filmed back-to-back with the rest of the trilogy over 438 days with A/B units.

=== Soundtrack ===
The soundtrack for the film was created by BAFTA-nominated and Grammy Award-winning composer Gordy Haab. It contains 30 tracks, with a total of 1 hour and 33 minutes.

At the opening of the 10th Silk Road International Film Festival, the artist Dadawa sang the main theme of the film.

=== Post-production ===
The final project used an important amount of computer-generated visual effects. It was made with a team of over 8000 people for pre-production and filming, followed by 1500 people for post-production and visual effects.

== Release ==
=== Theatrical ===
Creation of the Gods I: Kingdom of Storms was released on July 20, 2023 in China.

Following its success in China, the film was released in the United States by Well Go USA on September 22, 2023, and internationally from 2023 to 2024.

=== Home media ===
The film was released for digital download on Amazon Prime Video, iTunes and Vudu, and on Blu-ray and DVD, by Well Go USA Entertainment on May 28, 2024. It was also released on Netflix in certain regions.

== Sequels ==
The two sequel films of the trilogy, Demon Force and Creation Under Heaven, were due to be released in 2024 and 2025, but the release of Demon Force was delayed due to the complexity of the visual effects.

The second film was released on January 29, 2025 and focusses on Xiqi's defense against Shang's attack, while the third film features Xiqi's counterattack, eventual victory and establishment of the Zhou dynasty.

== Reception ==
=== Box office ===
On the opening weekend, its box office was ranked as No.1 in the Chinese market. By the 6th day, its gross reached $70 million. After its worldwide release, the film grossed $373.9 million out of a $110.3 million budget.

=== Critical response ===
The film received 8.0 out of 10 points on the Chinese review website Douban.com.

On the review aggregator website Rotten Tomatoes, 60% of 10 critics' reviews are positive, with an average rating of 6.3/10.

Ryan Gilbey from The Guardian gave the film three stars out of five and wrote "Director Wuershan’s ambitious adaptation of Xu Zhonglin’s 16th-century novel has too much highly variable CGI but its idiosyncrasies set it apart". Abhishek Srivastava from The Times of India also gave it three stars out of five, calling it a "missed opportunity" and saying that it "fails to deliver anything epic beyond its visual grandeur". James Marsh from the South China Morning Post gave it four out of five stars, writing "Wuershan’s film is a ravishing romp through Chinese folklore that bursts with sumptuous production design, breathless action, and some surprisingly racy scenes of forbidden passion between Lord Yin and his supernatural consort".

== Accolades ==
Year	Ceremony	Award	Result	Ref
2023	2023 Weibo Night	Movie of the Year	Won	
2023	The 18th China Changchun Film Festival	'Golden Deer Award' for Best Film	Nominated	
2023	The 18th China Changchun Film Festival	‘Golden Deer Award’ for Best Editing	Won	
2023	2023 Filming Italy	Best Film Award for Best Genre - Artistic Contribution	Won	
2023	36th Golden Rooster Awards	Best Feature Film	Won	
