= Kongtong Mountains =

Mountain in Gansu, China

Kongtong Mountains (Chinese: 崆峒山; pinyin: Kōngtóng Shān) is one of the sacred mountains of Taoism. It is located in Pingliang City, Gansu Province, People's Republic of China. It is the mythical meeting site between the Yellow Emperor (also known as Huangdi or by his given name 'Xuan Yuan') and Guangchengzi.

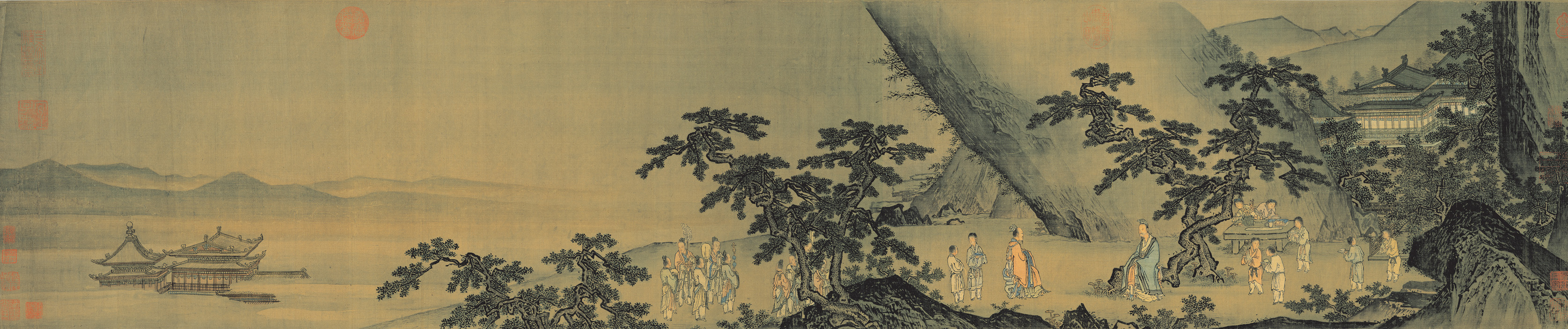
Shi Rui, Xuan Yuan Inquires of the Dao, National Palace Museum, Taipei

== See also ==
- Kongtong Sect
