= Tai Sui =

Star opposite Jupiter in Chinese zodiac

- Traditional Chinese: 太歲
- Simplified Chinese: 太岁
- Literal meaning: great years
Transcriptions
Standard Mandarin
- Hanyu Pinyin: tài suì
Yue: Cantonese
- Jyutping: taai3 seoi3
Southern Min
- Hokkien POJ: Thài-sòe
- Tâi-lô: Thài-suè
Middle Chinese
- Middle Chinese: tʰɑi^{H} siuᴇi^{H}

Tai Sui is a Chinese name for stars directly opposite the planet Jupiter (Chinese: 木星; pinyin: Mùxīng) in its roughly 12-year orbital cycle. Personified as deities, they are important features of Chinese astrology, Feng Shui, Taoism, and to a lesser extent Chinese Buddhism.

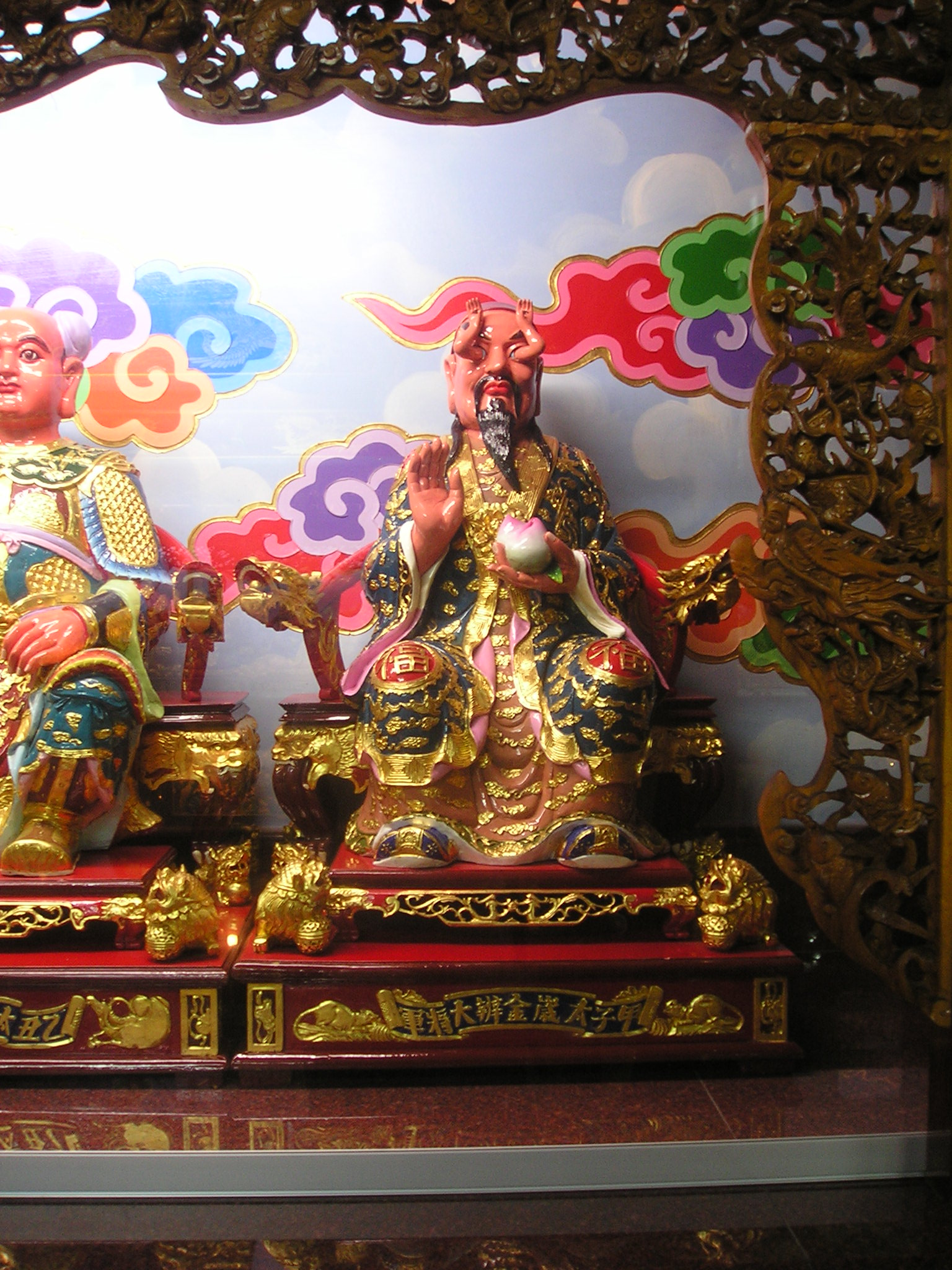
Tai Sui General #1 (甲子太歲金辨大將軍)

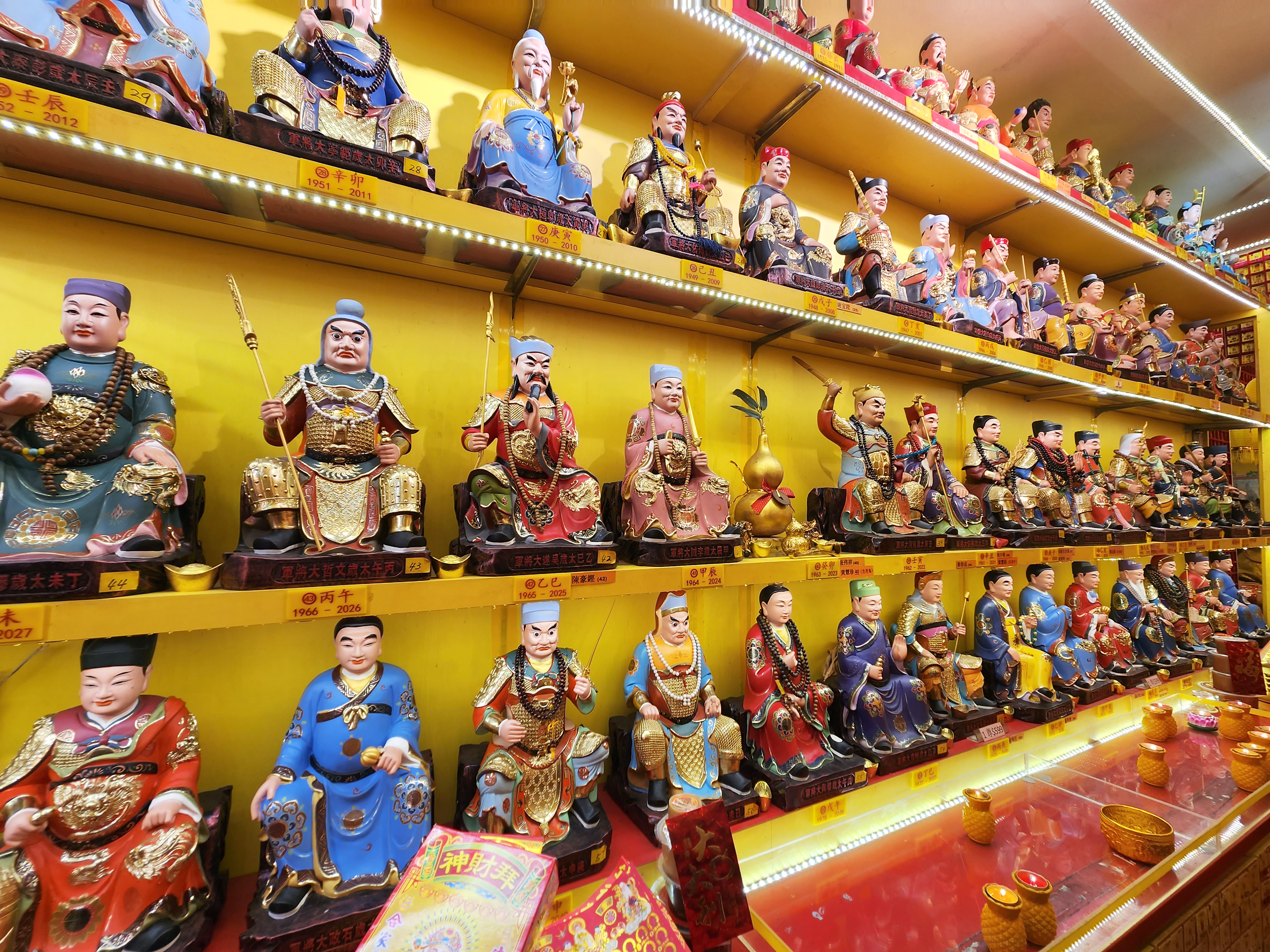
Tai Sui altar in Singapore.

The 12 signs of the Chinese zodiac were based on divisions of the Jovian orbital cycle, rather than as in the western zodiac—the apparent motion of the sun relative to the celestial sphere. The star thought to oppose Jupiter during each year of the cycle was personified as a heavenly general or cycle god and was believed to help the Jade Emperor control the mortal world.

By the Warring States period, the Tai Sui had become gods in the popular astrology; but no written records have been found of their worship prior to the Han dynasty. The earliest such record is found in Wang Chong's first-century Lunheng. There are several legends related to the Tai Sui, usually about people suffering disaster after disrespecting or ignoring them.

Their number later quintupled to sixty based on combinations of the twelve divisions (reckoned using the earthly stems) with the five Chinese elements of fire, earth, metal, water, and wood. Each of the gods' features and attributes signifies the well-being or mishap of that year. For example, if the Tai Sui of a year holds a pen, this signifies political unrest for that particular year. On the other hand, a Tai Sui of the year who holds a spear or sword, signifies a need to work hard and excel in that year.

Yin Jiao, leader of the sixty Taisui Xingjun (太歲星君) gods, doesn't govern any specific year in the 60-year cycle, and all of them were governed by one of the 60 subordinate Taisui. Yin Jiao in this context is called Taisui Tongling Yin Yuanshuai (太歲統領殷元帥, lit. Commander of the Tai Sui, General Yin). In Japan and Japanese folklore, however, "Taisui Xingjun" is just one singular god.

== Practices ==
In Taoism, those whose birth signs or other features clash with the Tai Sui of the year face misfortunes or disturbances for that year. This applies in each year to people born under four of the twelve animal zodiac signs. In 2017 for example, it applied to people born in the years of the rat, rabbit, horse and rooster. In Taiwan, as the lunar year begins, people go to temples to seek peace and protection and drive away bad influences. This ceremony is known as "An Tai Sui" (安太歲) or pacifying the Tai Sui of the Year. In return, worshipers will receive a protective talisman from the temple which will give the person one year's spiritual protection. This tradition is also practiced by other overseas Chinese communities.

In Chinese culture it has been traditionally considered taboo to build a house facing Taisui (or in the directly opposite direction) in the corresponding year of the Chinese zodiac. A similar belief is associated with moving houses and the line drawn through the old and new dwellings.

No./ Order/ Year	Yang/ Yin Years (30 Yang + 30 Yin Years)	Secret Name Talisman of the Tai Sui (the Balance and Order of the current Yang/ Yin Years)		Sexagenary Year of Tài-Suì (Star God-Deity Presiding Over The Year)			Name of Dà-Jiāng-Jūn (Heavenly Guardian General)		Associations (Five Elements)	AD	BC	Current Cycle
No./ Order/ Year	Yang/ Yin Years (30 Yang + 30 Yin Years)	Yin Talismans – Name used those born in Yang Years (in black)	Yang Talismans – Name used those born in Yin Years (in red)	Ten Heavenly Stem	Twelve Earthly Branch (Chinese Zodiac)	Heavenly Stem-Earthly Branch Combination (Mandarin Pinyin)	Mandarin Chinese	Pinyin (Surname – Birth Name)	Associations (Five Elements)	AD	BC	Current Cycle
1	陽 Yang			甲	子 (Rat)	甲子太歲 Jiǎ-Zǐ Tài-Suì	金辨大將軍	Jīn Biàn Dà-Jiāng-Jūn	Yang Wood Rat	4	57	1984
2	陰 Yin			乙	丑 (Ox)	乙丑太歲 Yǐ-Chǒu Tài-Suì	陳材大將軍	Chén Cái Dà-Jiāng-Jūn	Yin Wood Ox	5	56	1985
3	陽 Yang			丙	寅 (Tiger)	丙寅太歲 Bǐng-Yín Tài-Suì	耿章大將軍	Gěng Zhāng Dà-Jiāng-Jūn	Yang Fire Tiger	6	55	1986
4	陰 Yin			丁	卯 (Rabbit)	丁卯太歲 Dīng-Mǎo Tài-Suì	沈興大將軍	Shěn Xīng Dà-Jiāng-Jūn	Yin Fire Rabbit	7	54	1987
5	陽 Yang			戊	辰 (Dragon)	戊辰太歲 Wù-Chén Tài-Suì	趙達大將軍	Zhào Dá Dà-Jiāng-Jūn	Yang Earth Dragon	8	53	1988
6	陰 Yin			己	巳 (Snake)	己巳太歲 Jǐ-Sì Tài-Suì	郭燦大將軍	Guō Càn Dà-Jiāng-Jūn	Yin Earth Snake	9	52	1989
7	陽 Yang			庚	午 (Horse)	庚午太歲 Gēng-Wǔ Tài-Suì	王濟大將軍	Wáng Jì Dà-Jiāng-Jūn	Yang Metal Horse	10	51	1990
8	陰 Yin			辛	未 (Goat)	辛未太歲 Xīn-Wèi Tài-Suì	李素大將軍	Lǐ Sù Dà-Jiāng-Jūn	Yin Metal Goat	11	50	1991
9	陽 Yang			壬	申 (Monkey)	壬申太歲 Rén-Shēn Tài-Suì	劉旺大將軍	Liú Wàng Dà-Jiāng-Jūn	Yang Water Monkey	12	49	1992
10	陰 Yin			癸	酉 (Rooster)	癸酉太歲 Guǐ-Yǒu Tài-Suì	康志大將軍	Kāng Zhì Dà-Jiāng-Jūn	Yin Water Rooster	13	48	1993
11	陽 Yang			甲	戌 (Dog)	甲戌太歲 Jiǎ-Xū Tài-Suì	施廣大將軍	Shī Guǎng Dà-Jiāng-Jūn	Yang Wood Dog	14	47	1994
12	陰 Yin			乙	亥 (Pig)	乙亥太歲 Yǐ-Hài Tài-Suì	任保大將軍	Rèn Bǎo Dà-Jiāng-Jūn	Yin Wood Pig	15	46	1995
13	陽 Yang			丙	子 (Rat)	丙子太歲 Bǐng-Zǐ Tài-Suì	郭嘉大將軍	Guō Jiā Dà-Jiāng-Jūn	Yang Fire Rat	16	45	1996
14	陰 Yin			丁	丑 (Ox)	丁丑太歲 Dīng-Chǒu Tài-Suì	汪文大將軍	Wāng Wén Dà-Jiāng-Jūn	Yin Fire Ox	17	44	1997
15	陽 Yang			戊	寅 (Tiger)	戊寅太歲 Wù-Yín Tài-Suì	魯先大將軍	Lǔ Xiān Dà-Jiāng-Jūn	Yang Earth Tiger	18	43	1998
16	陰 Yin			己	卯 (Rabbit)	己卯太歲 Jǐ-Mǎo Tài-Suì	龍仲大將軍	Lóng Zhòng Dà-Jiāng-Jūn	Yin Earth Rabbit	19	42	1999
17	陽 Yang			庚	辰 (Dragon)	庚辰太歲 Gēng-Chén Tài-Suì	董德大將軍	Dǒng Dé Dà-Jiāng-Jūn	Yang Metal Dragon	20	41	2000
18	陰 Yin			辛	巳 (Snake)	辛巳太歲 Xīn-Sì Tài-Suì	鄭但大將軍	Zhèng Dàn Dà-Jiāng-Jūn	Yin Metal Snake	21	40	2001
19	陽 Yang			壬	午 (Horse)	壬午太歲 Rén-Wǔ Tài-Suì	陸明大將軍	Lù Míng Dà-Jiāng-Jūn	Yang Water Horse	22	39	2002
20	陰 Yin			癸	未 (Goat)	癸未太歲 Guǐ-Wèi Tài-Suì	魏仁大將軍	Wèi Rén Dà-Jiāng-Jūn	Yin Water Goat	23	38	2003
21	陽 Yang			甲	申 (Monkey)	甲申太歲 Jiǎ-Shēn Tài-Suì	方傑大將軍	Fāng Jié Dà-Jiāng-Jūn	Yang Wood Monkey	24	37	2004
22	陰 Yin			乙	酉 (Rooster)	乙酉太歲 Yǐ-Yǒu Tài-Suì	蔣崇大將軍	Jiǎng Chóng Dà-Jiāng-Jūn	Yin Wood Rooster	25	36	2005
23	陽 Yang			丙	戌 (Dog)	丙戌太歲 Bǐng-Xū Tài-Suì	白敏大將軍	Bái Mǐn Dà-Jiāng-Jūn	Yang Fire Dog	26	35	2006
24	陰 Yin			丁	亥 (Pig)	丁亥太歲 Dīng-Hài Tài-Suì	封濟大將軍	Fēng Jì Dà-Jiāng-Jūn	Yin Fire Pig	27	34	2007
25	陽 Yang			戊	子 (Rat)	戊子太歲 Wù-Zǐ Tài-Suì	鄒鐺大將軍	Zōu Dāng Dà-Jiāng-Jūn	Yang Earth Rat	28	33	2008
26	陰 Yin			己	丑 (Ox)	己丑太歲 Jǐ-Chǒu Tài-Suì	傅佑大將軍	Fù Yòu Dà-Jiāng-Jūn	Yin Earth Ox	29	32	2009
27	陽 Yang			庚	寅 (Tiger)	庚寅太歲 Gēng-Yín Tài-Suì	鄔桓大將軍	Wū Huán Dà-Jiāng-Jūn	Yang Metal Tiger	30	31	2010
28	陰 Yin			辛	卯 (Rabbit)	辛卯太歲 Xīn-Mǎo Tài-Suì	范寧大將軍	Fàn Níng Dà-Jiāng-Jūn	Yin Metal Rabbit	31	30	2011
29	陽 Yang			壬	辰 (Dragon)	壬辰太歲 Rén-Chén Tài-Suì	彭泰大將軍	Péng Tài Dà-Jiāng-Jūn	Yang Water Dragon	32	29	2012
30	陰 Yin			癸	巳 (Snake)	癸巳太歲 Guǐ-Sì Tài-Suì	徐單大將軍	Xú Dān Dà-Jiāng-Jūn	Yin Water Snake	33	28	2013
31	陽 Yang			甲	午 (Horse)	甲午太歲 Jiǎ-Wǔ Tài-Suì	章詞大將軍	Zhang Cí Dà-Jiāng-Jūn	Yang Wood Horse	34	27	2014
32	陰 Yin			乙	未 (Goat)	乙未太歲 Yǐ-Wèi Tài-Suì	楊仙大將軍	Yáng Xiān Dà-Jiāng-Jūn	Yin Wood Goat	35	26	2015
33	陽 Yang			丙	申 (Monkey)	丙申太歲 Bǐng-Shēn Tài-Suì	管仲大將軍	Guǎn Zhòng Dà-Jiāng-Jūn	Yang Fire Monkey	36	25	2016
34	陰 Yin		Yang Year	丁	酉 (Rooster)	丁酉太歲 Dīng-Yǒu Tài-Suì	唐傑大將軍	Táng Jié Dà-Jiāng-Jūn	Yin Fire Rooster	37	24	2017
35	陽 Yang			戊	戌 (Dog)	戊戌太歲 Wù-Xū Tài-Suì	姜武大將軍	Jiāng Wǔ Dà-Jiāng-Jūn	Yang Earth Dog	38	23	2018
36	陰 Yin			己	亥 (Pig)	己亥太歲 Jǐ-Hài Tài-Suì	謝太大將軍	Xiè Tài Dà-Jiāng-Jūn	Yin Earth Pig	39	22	2019
37	陽 Yang			庚	子 (Rat)	庚子太歲 Gēng-Zǐ Tài-Suì	盧秘大將軍	Lú Bì Dà-Jiāng-Jūn	Yang Metal Rat	40	21	2020
38	陰 Yin			辛	丑 (Ox)	辛丑太歲 Xīn-Chǒu Tài-Suì	楊信大將軍	Yáng Xìn Dà-Jiāng-Jūn	Yin Metal Ox	41	20	2021
39	陽 Yang			壬	寅 (Tiger)	壬寅太歲 Rén-Yín Tài-Suì	賀諤大將軍	Hè È Dà-Jiāng-Jūn	Yang Water Tiger	42	19	2022
40	陰 Yin			癸	卯 (Rabbit)	癸卯太歲 Guǐ-Mǎo Tài-Suì	皮時大將軍	Pí Shí Dà-Jiāng-Jūn	Yin Water Rabbit	43	18	2023
41	陽 Yang			甲	辰 (Dragon)	甲辰太歲 Jiǎ-Chén Tài-Suì	李誠大將軍	Lǐ Chéng Dà-Jiāng-Jūn	Yang Wood Dragon	44	17	2024
42	陰 Yin			乙	巳 (Snake)	乙巳太歲 Yǐ-Sì Tài-Suì	吳遂大將軍	Wú Suì Dà-Jiāng-Jūn	Yin Wood Snake	45	16	2025
43	陽 Yang			丙	午 (Horse)	丙午太歲 Bǐng-Wǔ Tài-Suì	文哲大將軍	Wén Zhé Dà-Jiāng-Jūn	Yang Fire Horse	46	15	2026
44	陰 Yin			丁	未 (Goat)	丁未太歲 Dīng-Wèi Tài-Suì	繆丙大將軍	Miào Bǐng Dà-Jiāng-Jūn	Yin Fire Goat	47	14	2027
45	陽 Yang			戊	申 (Monkey)	戊申太歲 Wù-Shēn Tài-Suì	徐浩大將軍	Xú Hào Dà-Jiāng-Jūn	Yang Earth Monkey	48	13	2028
46	陰 Yin			己	酉 (Rooster)	己酉太歲 Jǐ-Yǒu Tài-Suì	程寶大將軍	Chéng Bǎo Dà-Jiāng-Jūn	Yin Earth Rooster	49	12	2029
47	陽 Yang			庚	戌 (Dog)	庚戌太歲 Gēng-Xū Tài-Suì	倪秘大將軍	Ní Bì Dà-Jiāng-Jūn	Yang Metal Dog	50	11	2030
48	陰 Yin			辛	亥 (Pig)	辛亥太歲 Xīn-Hài Tài-Suì	葉堅大將軍	Yè Jiān Dà-Jiāng-Jūn	Yin Metal Pig	51	10	2031
49	陽 Yang			壬	子 (Rat)	壬子太歲 Rén-Zǐ Tài-Suì	丘德大將軍	Qiū Dé Dà-Jiāng-Jūn	Yang Water Rat	52	9	2032
50	陰 Yin			癸	丑 (Ox)	癸丑太歲 Guǐ-Chǒu Tài-Suì	朱得大將軍	Zhū Dé Dà-Jiāng-Jūn	Yin Water Ox	53	8	2033
51	陽 Yang			甲	寅 (Tiger)	甲寅太歲 Jiǎ-Yín Tài-Suì	張朝大將軍	Zhāng Cháo Dà-Jiāng-Jūn	Yang Wood Tiger	54	7	2034
52	陰 Yin			乙	卯 (Rabbit)	乙卯太歲 Yǐ-Mǎo Tài-Suì	萬清大將軍	Wàn Qīng Dà-Jiāng-Jūn	Yin Wood Rabbit	55	6	2035
53	陽 Yang			丙	辰 (Dragon)	丙辰太歲 Bǐng-Chén Tài-Suì	辛亞大將軍	Xīn Yà Dà-Jiāng-Jūn	Yang Fire Dragon	56	5	2036
54	陰 Yin			丁	巳 (Snake)	丁巳太歲 Dīng-Sì Tài-Suì	楊彥大將軍	Yáng Yàn Dà-Jiāng-Jūn	Yin Fire Snake	57	4	2037
55	陽 Yang			戊	午 (Horse)	戊午太歲 Wù-Wǔ Tài-Suì	黎卿大將軍	Lí Qīng Dà-Jiāng-Jūn	Yang Earth Horse	58	3	2038
56	陰 Yin			己	未 (Goat)	己未太歲 Jǐ-Wèi Tài-Suì	傅黨大將軍	Fù Dǎng Dà-Jiāng-Jūn	Yin Earth Goat	59	2	2039
57	陽 Yang			庚	申 (Monkey)	庚申太歲 Gēng-Shēn Tài-Suì	毛梓大將軍	Máo Zǐ Dà-Jiāng-Jūn	Yang Metal Monkey	60	1	2040
58	陰 Yin			辛	酉 (Rooster)	辛酉太歲 Xīn-Yǒu Tài-Suì	石政大將軍	Shí Zhèng Dà-Jiāng-Jūn	Yin Metal Rooster	1	60	2041
59	陽 Yang			壬	戌 (Dog)	壬戌太歲 Rén-Xū Tài-Suì	洪充大將軍	Hóng Chōng Dà-Jiāng-Jūn	Yang Water Dog	2	59	2042
60	陰 Yin			癸	亥 (Pig)	癸亥太歲 Guǐ-Hài Tài-Suì	虞程大將軍	Yú Chéng Dà-Jiāng-Jūn	Yin Water Pig	3	58	2043

Images of the Deities of the 60 Heavenly General of Tai Sui in correspondence to the previous detailed table above (refer to the Year number to Tai Sui and Heavenly General, e.g.: Year 1 – 甲子太歲 Jiǎ-Zǐ Tài-Suì 金辨大將軍 Jīn Biàn Dà-Jiāng-Jūn).

	60 Heavenly Generals of Tai Sui									
Year	1	2	3	4	5	6	7	8	9	10
Name of Tai Sui (太歲)/ Name of Heavenly General (大將軍)	甲子太歲 金辨大將軍	乙丑太歲 陳材大將軍	丙寅太歲 耿章大將軍	丁卯太歲 沈興大將軍	戊辰太歲 趙達大將軍	己巳太歲 郭燦大將軍	庚午太歲 王濟大將軍	辛未太歲 李素大將軍	壬申太歲 劉旺大將軍	癸酉太歲 康志大將軍
Year	11	12	13	14	15	16	17	18	19	20
Name of Tai Sui (太歲)/ Name of Heavenly General (大將軍)	甲戌太歲 施廣大將軍	乙亥太歲 任保大將軍	丙子太歲 郭嘉大將軍	丁丑太歲 汪文大將軍	戊寅太歲 魯先大將軍	己卯太歲 龍仲大將軍	庚辰太歲 董德大將軍	辛巳太歲 鄭但大將軍	壬午太歲 陸明大將軍	癸未太歲 魏仁大將軍
Year	21	22	23	24	25	26	27	28	29	30
Name of Tai Sui (太歲)/ Name of Heavenly General (大將軍)	甲申太歲 方傑大將軍	乙酉太歲 蔣崇大將軍	丙戌太歲 白敏大將軍	丁亥太歲 封濟大將軍	戊子太歲 鄒鐺大將軍	己丑太歲 傅佑大將軍	庚寅太歲 鄔桓大將軍	辛卯太歲 范寧大將軍	壬辰太歲 彭泰大將軍	癸巳太歲 徐單大將軍
Year	31	32	33	34	35	36	37	38	39	40
Name of Tai Sui (太歲)/ Name of Heavenly General (大將軍)	甲午太歲 章詞大將軍	乙未太歲 楊仙大將軍	丙申太歲 管仲大將軍	丁酉太歲 唐傑大將軍	戊戌太歲 姜武大將軍	己亥太歲 謝太大將軍	庚子太歲 盧秘大將軍	辛丑太歲 楊信大將軍	壬寅太歲 賀諤大將軍	癸卯太歲 皮時大將軍
Year	41	42	43	44	45	46	47	48	49	50
Name of Tai Sui (太歲)/ Name of Heavenly General (大將軍)	甲辰太歲 李誠大將軍	乙巳太歲 吳遂大將軍	丙午太歲 文哲大將軍	丁未太歲 繆丙大將軍	戊申太歲 徐浩大將軍	己酉太歲 程寶大將軍	庚戌太歲 倪秘大將軍	辛亥太歲 葉堅大將軍	壬子太歲 丘德大將軍	癸丑太歲 朱得大將軍
Year	51	52	53	54	55	56	57	58	59	60
Name of Tai Sui (太歲)/ Name of Heavenly General (大將軍)	甲寅太歲 張朝大將軍	乙卯太歲 萬清大將軍	丙辰太歲 辛亞大將軍	丁巳太歲 楊彥大將軍	戊午太歲 黎卿大將軍	己未太歲 傅黨大將軍	庚申太歲 毛梓大將軍	辛酉太歲 石政大將軍	壬戌太歲 洪充大將軍	癸亥太歲 虞程大將軍

== See also ==
- Doumu (斗母元君)
- Sexagenary cycle
- Heavenly stems & Earthly branches
- Chinese folk religion
