= Zhuangzi =

Zhuangzi may refer to:

- Zhuangzi (book) (莊子), an ancient Chinese collection of anecdotes and fables, one of the foundational texts of Taoism
  - Zhuang Zhou (莊周), the historical figure known as "Master Zhuang" ("Zhuangzi") and traditional author of the eponymous book
- Old Zhuang script (古壮字, the script used by the Zhuang people in ancient times, also known as Sawndip
- "Zhuangzi", the fifth episode of season 4 of science fiction television series Westworld
