= Fei Xiang =

Taiwanese-born American singer (born 1960)

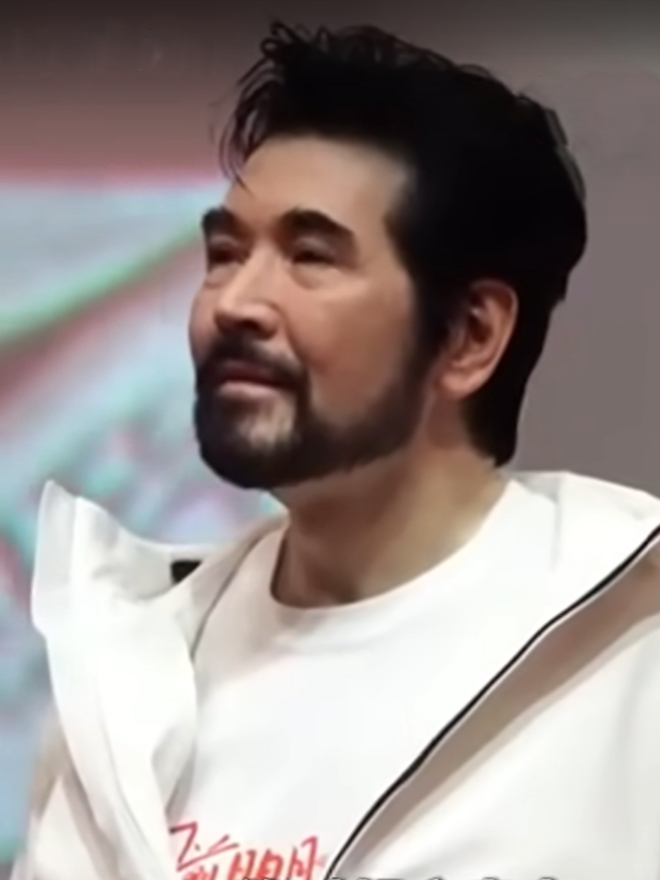
- Fei Xiang in 2024
- Born: Bart Hsiao Luan Phillips; December 24, 1960 (age 65); Taipei County, Taiwan
- Other name: Kris Phillips
- Education: Stanford University
- Occupations: Singer; actor; producer
- Years active: 1981–present
- Family: Anya Phillips (sister)

Fei Xiang
- Traditional Chinese: 費翔
- Simplified Chinese: 费翔
Transcriptions
Standard Mandarin
- Hanyu Pinyin: Fèi Xiáng
- Wade–Giles: Fei^{4} Hsiang^{2}
- IPA: [fêɪ ɕjǎŋ]

Fei Xiang (born Bart Hsiao Luan Phillips, known as Kris Phillips; traditional Chinese: 費 翔; simplified Chinese: 费翔; pinyin: Fèi Xiáng; Pe̍h-ōe-jī: Hùi Siông) is a Taiwanese-born American pop icon and singer both in Mandapop and English language music theater, who was also one of the biggest popular music stars in China during the 1980s.

He is Anya Philips's younger brother.

== Early life and education ==
Fei was born Bart Hsiao Luan Phillips on December 24, 1960, in Taipei, Taiwan. His father was an American and his mother was from Beijing, China. Fei spent his childhood in Taipei and was the younger maternal half-brother of Anya Phillips. Fluent in both English and Mandarin Chinese, he graduated from Taipei American School and entered Stanford University in 1978 on a full scholarship, but he later dropped out. After moving to New York City and attending the Neighborhood Playhouse School of the Theatre, he returned to Taiwan in 1981 to pursue an acting career.

== Professional career ==
=== Taiwan and Southeast Asia: 1981–1986 ===
Fei Xiang made his first television appearance at the end of 1981 in a Taiwanese TV drama. He was then signed by EMI and released his debut album Lingering in May 1982. The title track of the album was an instant hit that spent four weeks at number one. The album was certified gold and Fei Xiang won the award for Best New Artist of the year.

Seven subsequent albums produced during the early 1980s for EMI and PolyGram launched hit singles in Taiwan and Southeast Asia.

=== Mainland China: 1986–1990 ===
In 1986 Fei Xiang went with his mother to visit his grandmother in Beijing. In late 1986, Fei Xiang became the first pop singer from Taiwan to visit across the strait and perform in Mainland China. His first album produced and release in Mainland China, A Voice on the Ocean was recorded in Guangzhou and his rise to fame on Mainland China came almost instantaneously from his performance on the 1987 CCTV New Year's Gala, an action that was met with great protest by the Taiwan government. Due to the reaction and subsequent fall out, Fei then abandoned his career in Taiwan and solely focused on developing his music in Mainland China. The two songs he performed on the Gala, Winter Fire (the Chinese adaptation of Sexy Music) and Clouds of My Homeland became smash hits in the 80s. Many of the songs from the beginning of his career were also re-released in the Mainland during this period.

A Voice on the Ocean was Fei's highest-selling Chinese language album and has sold over 20 million copies in Mainland China and, combined with four subsequent albums, made Fei Xiang one of China's all-time best-selling recording artists. His 1989 Concert Tour of 63 consecutive sold-out stadium concerts in 12 major cities set a record in China that stands unsurpassed to this day.

=== Musical theatre: 1990–1996 ===
In 1990 Fei Xiang moved to New York and underwent formal vocal training, hoping to extend the range of his performances to Broadway theatre. Under his English name Kris Phillips, he won a role in the Original Broadway Cast of the musical Miss Saigon (1991). Later that same year, he was seen in the Original Broadway Cast of yet another musical, the short-lived Nick and Nora.

As Kris Phillips, Fei Xiang subsequently performed as a featured soloist with Sarah Brightman in The Music of Andrew Lloyd Webber, a concert with full orchestra that was presented in over 40 American cities, including two performances at New York's Radio City Music Hall. In this concert, Fei Xiang performed highlights from The Phantom of the Opera, Jesus Christ Superstar, and Sunset Boulevard.

=== Return to Asia: 1997–2010 ===
In 1997 Fei Xiang returned to China after a seven-year absence to take part in China Central Television's gala live telecast commemorating the Hong Kong handover. He resumed his recording and concert work, combining his biggest Chinese pop music hits with his newly developed musical theatre repertoire. He signed a new recording contract with Forward Music and released two new Chinese language pop albums: Having Loved You (2000) and Wildflower (2002).

In 2001, Andrew Lloyd Webber produced and personally supervised a major new production of The Music of Andrew Lloyd Webber starring Elaine Paige and Fei Xiang. Andrew Lloyd Webber attended the Beijing performance of this Concert, which was staged in The Great Hall of The People and filmed for DVD release and worldwide telecast. Through repeated broadcasts on China Central Television, this concert was instrumental in introducing musical theatre to a nationwide Chinese audience.

To further promote musical theatre among his Chinese-speaking audience, Fei Xiang released The Broadway Album in 2005, a double-CD recorded with a 36-piece orchestra in New York. One CD contains Broadway standards sung in English and a second CD presents other standards performed in Mandarin Chinese. The official Chinese-language version of several songs from The Phantom of The Opera were included on this album and Fei Xiang sang The Music of the Night at the Taipei premiere of the film version of The Phantom of the Opera.

In 2006, Fei Xiang was invited to star as the Emcee in Toy Factory's production of the musical Cabaret in Singapore. The sold-out production was a commercial and critical success, with Fei Xiang's performance and "electrifying presence" garnering rave reviews.

Fei Xiang released a theme song for the 2008 Summer Olympics in Beijing and sang on China Central Television telecasts celebrating the Beijing Olympics in Los Angeles and London. In 2009, he performed in Australia for the first time, presenting two sold-out concerts at Sydney's Lyric Theatre.

=== Entertainment Icon: 2011–present ===
Fei Xiang is widely recognized as an icon of Chinese entertainment and enjoys enormous popularity among multiple generations of Chinese audiences. He continues to perform his repertoire of Chinese pop standards throughout China and around the world.

In January 2015, Fei Xiang released his 17th studio album, Human. Described as "a perfect synthesis of electronic orchestration and lush vocal performance", Human received multiple nominations at the 16th Chinese Music Media Awards (Best Male Artist, Best Producer) and won the jury's award for Album of the Year.

== Acting ==
Fei Xiang made a surprise guest appearance in 2012, starring as the chief villain Tian Lang Sorcerer, in the Chinese fantasy film Painted Skin: The Resurrection. He appeared on the red carpet at the 2012 Cannes Film Festival and the film went on to smash China's domestic film box-office record.

In 2016, Fei Xiang made another rare film appearance, co-starring with the legendary Chinese actress Gong Li in The Monkey King 2. The film was a major hit, earning over US$185 million at the Chinese box office.

In 2019, it was announced that Fei Xiang will play King Zhou of Shang in the upcoming epic fantasy film series Fengshen Trilogy directed by Wuershan, based on the Ming dynasty novel Investiture of the Gods. The first film of the trilogy, Creation of the Gods I: Kingdom of Storms was released on July 20, 2023.

== Names ==
Kris Phillips is his actual birth name. He was named "Kris" as he was born on Christmas Eve. His Chinese name was formed from the Chinese pronunciation of the first syllable in Phillips, "Fei" and choosing Xiang as his given name, taken from a homophone of the Chinese for 'soaring' or 'taking flight' (飛翔; fēi xiáng). Other variations due to different transliteration practices are Fei Tsiang, Fei Cheung and Fei Hsiang.
