= Chijingzi =

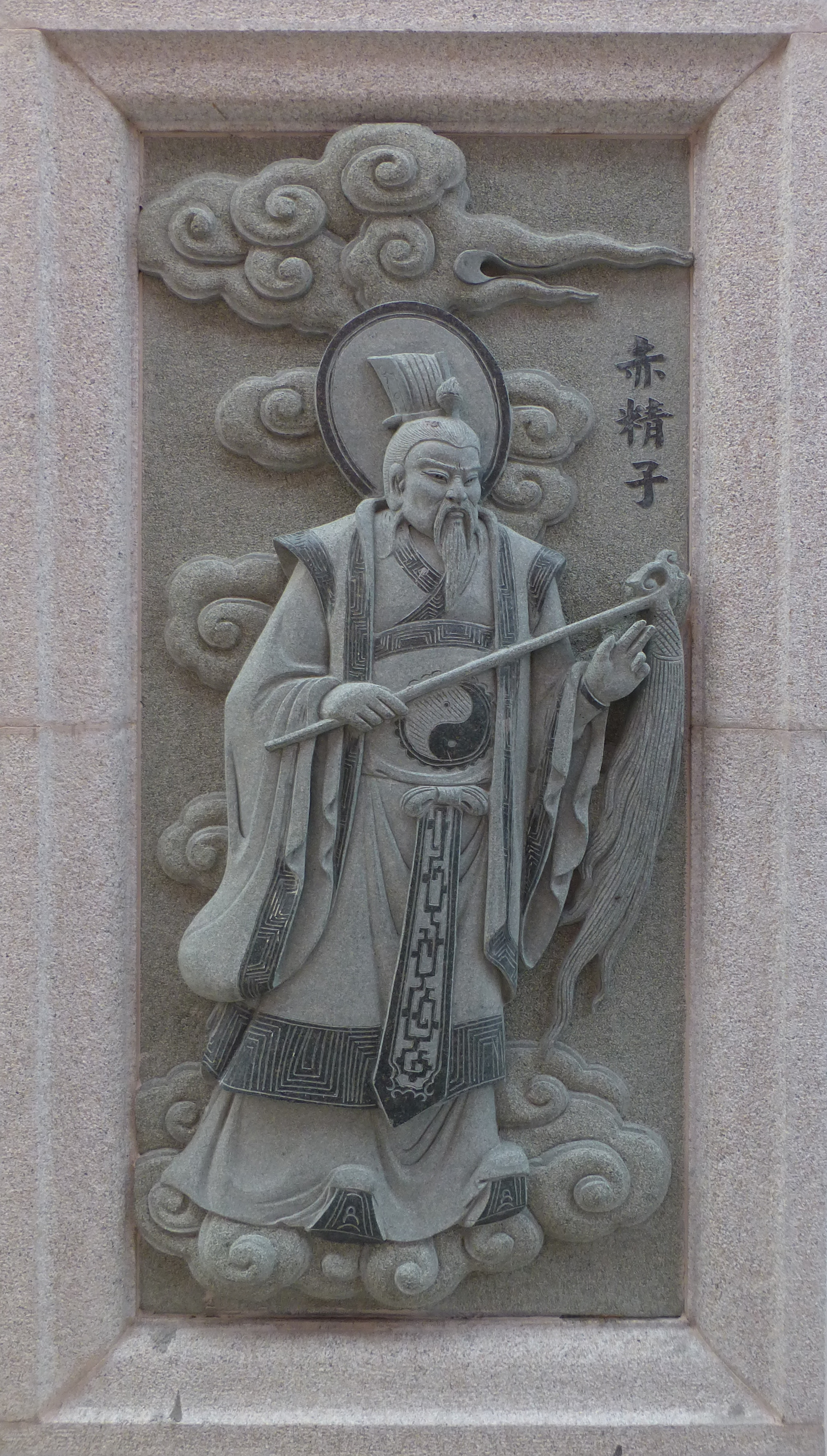
Relief of Chijingzi

Chijingzi (Chinese: 赤精子; pinyin: Chìjīngzǐ; lit. "Master of the Red Essence") is a figure in Chinese mythology who appears in two distinct contexts: as an ancient immortal (guxian) in early Daoist hagiographies, and as one of the "Twelve Golden Immortals" in the 16th-century Ming dynasty novel Investiture of the Gods (Fengshen Yanyi).

== Daoist and historical traditions ==
Chijingzi appears in Chinese texts written long before Investiture of the Gods. He is mentioned in the Soushen Ji (搜神記) and the Yuan-dynasty Lishi Zhenxian Tidao Tongjian (歷世真仙體道通鑑). The latter says that Chijingzi lived during the time of the legendary Emperor Zhuanxu. He taught people the Weiyan Jing (微言經; Scripture of Subtle Words) and told them to be loyal and obedient. It also quotes the Nanyue Zongsheng Ji (南岳總聖集), which says there was a place called the Scripture-Transmitting Altar (傳經壇) on Furong Peak. During the Jin dynasty, people were said to have seen several children and white cranes flying near the mountain.

The same book also gives Chijingzi another name, Xie Yizi (燮邑子). It says he came down to Mount Qi and taught people to be kind and honest. The Lord of the West, later known as King Wen of Zhou, heard about him and invited him to serve as Keeper of the Archives. In this account, Chijingzi also taught a text called the Chijing Jing (赤精經).

Chijingzi is also mentioned in the Book of Han (Han Shu). During the reign of Emperor Cheng of Han (33–7 BCE), a man named Gan Zhongke (甘忠可) claimed that Chijingzi had come down from heaven to teach him. Gan said the Han dynasty was nearing the end of a heavenly cycle and needed to receive a new mandate from heaven. He wrote a text called the Tianguanli Baoyuan Taiping Jing (天官曆包元太平經) and taught these ideas to his followers. Liu Xiang accused Gan of using spirits to deceive the emperor and the people. Gan was sent to prison, where he died before his case was settled. His followers later continued to teach his ideas.

Historian Jiang Sheng writes that this story became known as the "Chijingzi prophecy" (赤精子之讖). He links it to the belief that Emperor Gaozu of Han, the founder of the Han dynasty, was born from the Red Emperor (Chidi). The prophecy was used to argue that the Han dynasty needed a new mandate from heaven. Jiang also traces these ideas to early Taiping (Great Peace) teachings and the Han belief in Fire Virtue (火德).

Chijingzi is sometimes confused with Chisongzi (赤松子), another ancient immortal. Chisongzi is described in the Liexian Zhuan (列仙傳) as a Rain Master who lived during the time of Shennong. He also appears in a commentary on the Classic of Mountains and Seas (Shan Hai Jing). Chijingzi and Chisongzi are different figures.

== In Investiture of the Gods ==
In the novel Investiture of the Gods (Fengshen Yanyi), Chijingzi is one of the Twelve Golden Immortals and a senior disciple of Yuanshi Tianzun. He resides at Cloud-Rising Cave (雲霄洞; Yunxiao Dong) on Mount Taihua and serves as the master of the Shang prince Yin Hong. Chijingzi gives Yin Hong several powerful treasures, including the Yin-Yang Mirror (陰陽鏡), which can kill or revive a person depending on how it is used, and the Bagua Purple-Ribbon Immortal Garment.

Despite his master's guidance, Yin Hong is persuaded by Shen Gongbao to betray the Zhou cause and return to the Shang side. Before accepting him as a disciple, Chijingzi had made Yin Hong swear a blood oath that he would die by fire if he ever broke his promise. After Yin Hong betrays the oath, Chijingzi reluctantly uses the Taiji Diagram (太極圖) to fulfill the vow and execute his own disciple.
