= Shi Rui =

Chinese landscape and building painter

Shi Rui (simplified Chinese: 石锐; traditional Chinese: 石銳; pinyin: Shí Ruì; Wade–Giles: Shih Jui), courtesy name also Shi Rui, was a Chinese landscape and building painter in the early Ming dynasty. His birth and death years are unknown. He was a native of Qiantang (錢塘, modern day Hangzhou in Zhejiang Province) and was active during the Xuande era (1426–1435) up to the Jingtai era (1449–1457). He served as an official at the Hall of Benevolence and Wisdom (仁智殿)

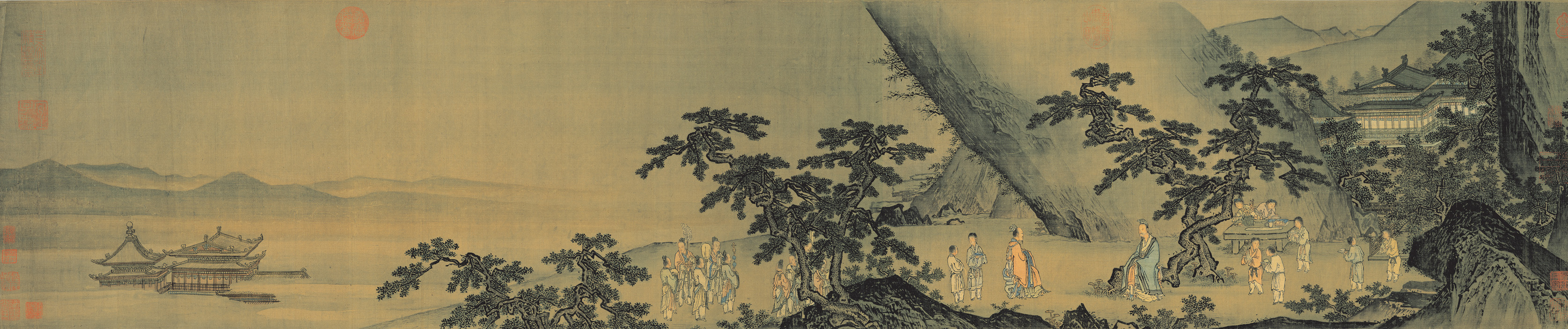
Shi Rui, Xuan Yuan Inquires of the Dao, National Palace Museum, Taipei
