= Ne Zha 2 =

2025 animated fantasy action adventure film by Jiaozi

- Theatrical release poster
- Simplified Chinese: 哪吒之魔童闹海
- Traditional Chinese: 哪吒之魔童鬧海
- Literal meaning: Nezha: The Demon Boy Churns the Sea
- Hanyu Pinyin: Nézhā zhī Mó tóng nào hǎi
- Directed by: Jiaozi
- Screenplay by: Jiaozi
- Based on: Investiture of the Gods by Xu Zhonglin
- Produced by: Liu Wenzhang; Wang Jing
- Starring: Lü Yanting; Han Mo; Lu Qi; Zhang Jiaming; Wang Deshun; Zhuo Yongxi
- Cinematography: Shi Chaoqun
- Edited by: Lin Qiuying
- Music by: Wan Pin Chu; Rui Yang; Roc Chen
- Production companies: Chengdu Coco Cartoon; Beijing Enlight Media; Beijing Enlight Pictures; Chengdu Zizai Jingjie Culture Media; Beijing Coloroom Technology
- Distributed by: Beijing Enlight Pictures; A24; CMC Pictures (United States)
- Release date: 29 January 2025 (China)
- Running time: 144 minutes
- Country: China
- Language: Mandarin
- Budget: US$80 million (¥600 million)
- Box office: US$2.270 billion

Ne Zha 2 (Chinese: 哪吒之魔童闹海; pinyin: Nézhā zhī Mótóng nào hǎi; also known as 哪吒2; Nézhā èr) is a 2025 Chinese animated fantasy adventure film written and directed by Jiaozi based on the titular mythic figure of Chinese legend and Xu Zhonglin's 16th-century novel Investiture of the Gods (Fengshen Yanyi). It is the direct sequel to Ne Zha (2019). The film takes up the story of Chinese mythological character Ne Zha and his friend Ao Bing. After a sacrifice, only Ne Zha's body can be recreated, although he carries Ao Bing's spirit within. Ne Zha calls on this spirit in his fight against Master Shen.

Ne Zha 2 was released in theaters across China on 29 January 2025, coinciding with the first day of the Chinese New Year. Like its predecessor, the film received highly positive reviews from critics, and achieved even greater commercial success at a gross of $2.2 billion worldwide against a production budget of US$80 million. Ne Zha 2 broke numerous box office records inside and outside China, including becoming the highest-grossing film in a single box office territory, the highest-grossing animated film, being the first adult animated film in this position, the highest-grossing non-English language film and the first animated film in history to cross the $2 billion mark, as well as being the highest-selling animated film based on ticket sales, overtaking The Jungle Book (1967). It also became the highest-grossing film of 2025 and the fourth-highest-grossing film at the time of its release. A sequel is in development.

== Plot ==
After Ne Zha and Ao Bing are struck by godly lightning together, their bodies are destroyed. (Note: As depicted in Ne Zha (2019)) To prevent their souls from dying, Master Taiyi Zhenren exhausts his Seven-Colored Sacred Lotus to regenerate their physical bodies, though they are still fragile. Ao Bing's father Ao Guang, the Dragon King of the East Sea, believing his son is dead, orders Master Shen Gongbao to attack Chentang Pass with the demons imprisoned under his palace and the other three Dragon Kings of the Four Seas. Ao Bing defends Chentang Pass, but his new body disintegrates due to the effort exerted.

Ao Guang makes a ceasefire deal: Ao Bing and Ne Zha will share Ne Zha's body for seven days, complete three trials to become a xian (immortal) and win a potion that can restore the Sacred Lotus and create a new body for Ao Bing, upon which Ao Guang's forces will retreat. The trials are set by Immortal Wuliang, leader of the heavenly Chan sect. During the trials, candidates complete missions, which were normally performed by the sect's demon hunters, while supervised by Wuliang's disciples Deero and Crana.

Ne Zha takes sleeping pills to hide his demon nature during the trials, allowing Ao Bing to fully control his body temporarily. Together, Ne Zha and Ao Bing complete the first two trials: defeating a village of marmot demons and a master who trains demons to prepare for the xian trials, respectively.

In the meantime, Ao Guang tasks Shen Gongbao with guarding the Chentang Pass. Gongbao is temporarily reunited with his younger brother Shen Xiaobao. Xiaobao then witnesses Ne Zha's second trial where the master Shen Zhengdao, the Shen family's patriarch, is violently captured by the sect's forces. He returns to tell Gongbao of the sect's siege and plunder of their family's village, but is fatally wounded by Deero, dying from his injuries.

Before Ne Zha sets off on his third trial, he is informed that Chentang Pass was destroyed. Enraged, Ne Zha completes the third trial without Ao Bing's help, defeating the stone spirit Shi Ji, becoming xian and obtaining the potion. While Taiyi restores the Sacred Lotus with the potion and regenerates Ao Bing's body, Ne Zha joins Wuliang's forces to trap the dragons in Wuliang's giant cauldron, planning to forge the dragons and demons into Pills of Immortality. However, the other three dragon kings turn against Ao Guang by collaborating with Wuliang to escape the cauldron.

However, Li Jing and Lady Yin arrive at the cauldron unharmed with Ao Bing and Taiyi to explain the truth: Wuliang ordered the destruction of Chentang Pass and framed the dragons for it; he even convinced the other dragon kings to betray Ao Guang and frame him for the attack, all part of Wuliang's true plot to ensure the heavenly sect's domination. Nezha's parents escaped the destruction while Shen, who knew the truth of the attack, took a last stand to defend the city.

Exposed, Wuliang casts Ne Zha's group into the cauldron. As the heat of the cauldron rises, the prisoners are transformed into Pills of Immortality, including Lady Yin. A grieving Ne Zha absorbs the cauldron's samadhi fire, solidifying his new body, and thus is reborn. Alongside the dragons and demons, Ne Zha and Ao Bing break the cauldron and force Wuliang and his cohorts to retreat. In the aftermath, Ao Guang leads the remaining dragons and demons into hiding in the seas while allowing Ao Bing to stay behind and help Ne Zha expose Wuliang's nature.

Wuliang, Deero, and Crana head to a secret prison where Wuliang negotiates with the captive Shen Gongbao and Shen Zhengdao, hoping to recruit them, only to be trapped after Wuliang cursed a warden to sleep for 10 years for mocking his injuries, and that his registered injuries have healed. Ne Zha's older xian brothers Jinzha and Muzha are summoned to meet with Wuliang, but cannot find him when they arrive. Deero and Crana work to get Wuliang's injuries back to match the registered picture.

== Voice cast ==
| Character | | Voice actor | |
| Name | Description | Mandarin Chinese | English |
|---|---|---|---|
| Ne Zha | Reincarnation of the Demon Orb, son of Li Jing and Lady Yin. | Lü Yanting (child) Joseph Cao (囧森瑟夫) (adolescent) | Crystal Lee (child) (Note: Ne Zha's child form was previously voiced by Jordan Cole in the last film.) Griffin Puatu (adolescent) |
| Ao Bing | Reincarnation of the Spirit Pearl and the third son of Ao Guang, Dragon King of the East Sea. | Han Mo | Aleks Le |
| Lady Yin | Ne Zha's mother and the chieftess who governs Chentang Pass with her husband. | Lü Qi | Michelle Yeoh (Note: Lady Yin was previously voiced by Stephanie Sheh in the last film.) |
| Li Jing | Ne Zha's father who governs Chentang Pass with his wife. | Chen Hao | Vincent Rodriguez III |
| Taiyi Zhenren | Ne Zha's master, a Taoist xian who lives on the Kunlun. He serves as the film's comic relief. | Zhang Jiaming | Rick Zieff (Note: Taiyi Zhenren was previously voiced by Mike Pollock in the last film.) |
| Master xian Wuliang | The ruthless and cunning leader of the Taoist Chan sect. | Wang Deshun | William Utay (true form) Robert Clotworthy (disguised form) |
| Ao Guang | The Dragon King of the East Sea. | Li Nan Yu Chen (human) | Christopher Swindle |
| Ao Run | The Dragon Queen of the West Sea. | Zhou Yongxi | Kari Wahlgren |
| Shen Gongbao | An Indochinese leopard demon who has ascended to xian, Taiyi's martial brother, and Ao Bing's master. | Yang Wei | Daniel Riordan |
| Deero | A deer demon and the leader of the Demon Hunters who is one of Wuliang's disciples. | Yunqi Zhang | Damien Haas |
| Crana | A crane demon and one of Wuliang's disciples. | Xinglinr | Grace Lu |
| Ao Qin | The Dragon King of the South Sea. | Nan Yu | Fred Tatasciore |
| Ao Shun | The Dragon King of the North Sea. | Yuze Han | Michael Yurchak |
| Shen Zhengdao | The father of Shen Gongbao who trains animal demons. | Zhang Ji | Richard Epcar |
| Shen Xiaobao | A leopard demon who is Shen Gongbao's younger brother and Shen Zhendao's son. | Wang Zhixing | Aidyn Ahn |
| Sea Yaksha | A monster who can turn into water that Ne Zha and Ao Bing previously defeated. | Junpeng Reng | Fred Tatasciore (Note: The Sea Yaksha was previously voiced by Adam Sietz in the last film.) |
| Boundary Beasts | Two barrier-emitting creatures. | Joseph Cao Li Zing | Eric Bauza (Note: Boundary Beast #1 was previously voiced by Matthew Moy in the last film.) |
| Marmot Boss | The leader of a gang of marmots. | Liang Shen | Aaron LaPlante |
| Marmot Second-in-Command | The second-in-command of a gang of marmots. | Liang Shen | Eric Bauza |
| Lady Shi Ji | A powerful stone spirit. | Xiao V | Candi Milo |
| Mirror | A magic mirror owned by Lady Shi Ji. | Huang Ting | Erika Ishii |
| Boss of Kids | The leader of the kids that used to pick on Ne Zha. | —N/a | Kari Wahlgren |
| Jinzha | The older xian brother of Ne Zha. | Kai Cui | Eric Bauza |
| Muzha | The older xian brother of Ne Zha. | Yuze Han | David Cui Cui |

Additional English dub voices by Aidyn Ahn, Steve Allerick, Eric Bauza, Brook Chalmers, David Cui Cui, Richard Epcar, Damien Haas, Erika Ishii, Aaron LaPlante, Grace Lu, Candi Milo, Vincent Rodriguez III, Sean Rohani, Fred Tatasciore, Kari Wahlgren, Michael Yurchak, and Rick Zieff

== Production ==
Before the release of Ne Zha (2019), director Jiaozi said that the production team intended to develop a sequel if the film performed well at the box office. Ne Zha was commercially successful, and five days after it was released, the production team stated that a sequel was in development. The sequel was named "Nezha: The demon child churns the sea", or Ne Zha 2 in English. For this movie, the total cost for production reached 600 million yuan, breaking the 200 million yuan record of Deep Sea (2023) to become China's most expensive animated film. The film was also supported by Sichuan Province's funds for major cultural projects, which have an annual budget of 300 million yuan.

Ne Zha and Ne Zha 2 each took five years to produce. More than 4,000 people across 138 animation companies participated in the creation of the film, more than double the 1,600 people in the first film. Producer Liu Wenzhang said that the number of characters in this film is three times that of the previous film, which had more than 1,800 shots, while the sequel had more than 2,400 shots, including more than 1,900 special effects shots.

A documentary, Bùpò-bùlì (不破不立; 'No innovation without destruction') was released online on 10 February 2025, which describes the process of making Ne Zha 2.

=== Character design ===
The character design in the film had been upgraded from the original designs. For the human characters, a layer of fine white hair was added to their faces and tweaked to make them appear more natural and realistic.

Director Jiaozi hoped that all the characters in this film would incorporate elements of Chinese aesthetics. The design of the character "Deer Child" combines elements related to deer, with the patterns on their clothing inspired by traditional folk jade carving art. For the East Sea Dragon King Ao Guang, the production team initially planned to reference the image of the fierce and brutish Prince Kang from the 1992 film Royal Tramp. However, after listening to audience feedback, they decided to change it to a more mature image. Ao Guang's costume, the Dragon Scale Armor, features traditional Chinese tattoo-style dragon patterns to convey a sense of heaviness and strength, aligning with his "lofty" image. Additionally, the design of the "Lingzhu Version Nezha" character pays homage to the image of Nezha from the 1979 Shanghai Animation Film Studio animated feature Nezha Conquers the Dragon King.

The designs of the secondary characters, the underwater demon beasts, were inspired by early Chinese depictions of mythical creatures, incorporating features such as curved tusks, typical of Eastern monsters, which differ from Western monster imagery. To make each demon beast unique, their skin blends various materials, including fish scales and the skin of elephants, crocodiles and turtles.

=== Differences from novel ===
Although the films are based on the 16th-century Chinese novel Investiture of the Gods, the production team made significant changes and incorporated family and friendship elements, resulting in differences between the films and the original novel. In a sense, it is its own story featuring the mythological figure Nezha as the protagonist based on the assumption that the mythological character Nezha is the reincarnation of a demon. The Chinese original name of this series includes the word "Mo Tong"(魔童; 'Demon Child') . To distinguish it from other works featuring Nezha as the protagonist, sometimes the series are also known as "Demon Child" or "Demon Child: Ne Zha" in China.

In the original work, there is no concept of Chaos Pearl and Demon Orb. Ne Zha was the reincarnation of Spirit Pearl. However, he was portrayed as a naïve child with strong murderous intent, this became the inspiration for setting it as a demon reincarnation in this series. In the original work, one of Ne Zha's main deeds included randomly killing Ao Bing, the third son of the Dragon King of East Sea, and intimidating the Dragon King who was preparing to go to heaven to file a complaint. As a result, the Dragon King of the East Sea led the other Dragon Kings to threaten to slaughter Chentang Pass. Nezha had to commit suicide to quell the situation, but later resurrected with the help of his master Taiyi Zhenren. His also has a difficult relationship with his parents. His father Li Jing once obstructed his resurrection, which caused Nezha to become enraged and tried to hunt down and kill Li Jing after resurrection.

In addition, the main antagonist in this film, Master Xian Wuliang, and supporting characters such as Shen Xiaobao, are all original characters, and do not exist in the Investiture of the Gods.

== Music ==
The film's music, which was composed by Wan Pin Chu, Rui Yang and Roc Chen, combines orchestra-style scoring recorded at the Vienna Synchron Stage in Vienna with traditional folk music from the various regions in China. The cue for the Tianyuan Ding slowly sinking is Mongol Tuvan throat singing; the final battle combines suona and orchestral instruments. In addition, in order to express different scenes and characters, the film also uses pipa, xiao, Tianjin folk art tunes, thumb piano, Peking opera gongs and drums, Baroque instruments, synthesizers, and erhu, among other instruments. The opening passage adopts the Grand song of the Dong ethnic group, which was inscribed on the UNESCO Intangible Cultural Heritage List since 2009. It is performed by ensemble Wuyue Chan'ge, which consists of ten Dong women from Qiandongnan, Guizhou.

== Marketing ==
On 7 January 2025, the film's first trailer was released. A second trailer was released on 26 January 2025.

== Release ==
=== Theatrical ===
On 10 December 2024, the film was officially announced. It was released in mainland China on 29 January 2025 (the first day of the Chinese New Year) in 2D, 3D, IMAX, CINITY, CGS, Dolby Cinema, 4DX and other formats. The film was released in Australia, New Zealand, and other countries on 13 February 2025; in the United States (on limited release) and Canada on 14 February; and in Hong Kong and Macau on 22 February. In Southeast Asia, the film releases on dates ranging from 6 March (in Singapore) to 21 March (in Indonesia) with Encore Films handling distribution in Singapore and co-distributed with Warner Bros. Pictures in the rest of Southeast Asia. The film's opening date in the UK and Ireland was on 21 March, following previews on 14 March, by Trinity CineAsia. Additional European markets including France, Germany, Spain, Italy, Benelux and Scandinavian territories, followed soon afterwards, and opening date for Japan was 4 April. Encore Films and Warner Bros. Discovery India announced its Indian theatrical release on 25 April.

The film's English dub was released in the United States on 22 August 2025 by A24, with Michelle Yeoh (playing Lady Yin) leading a new cast of voice actors including Crystal Lee, Griffin Puatu, Aleks Le, Vincent Rodriguez III, Rick Zeiff, and William Utay among others.

=== Home media ===
The film began streaming on Chinese online streaming platforms from 2 August 2025. A24 released the English dub of the film for VOD on 16 September 2025.

== Reception ==
=== Box office ===
In three days after its release in China, the film's box office reached 1.1 billion yuan, the first movie to reach 1 billion yuan (US$137 million) at the box office during the Chinese New Year in 2025. On the fourth day of release, the box office exceeded 2 billion yuan. On the fifth day of release, it exceeded 3 billion yuan. It exceeded 4 billion yuan on only the sixth day of release, breaking the record for the fastest to reach 4 billion yuan set by Detective Chinatown 3 in 2021 (it took nine days and nine hours). The box office exceeded 5 billion (US$684 million) on the eighth day of release, breaking the record of 5 billion set by The Battle at Lake Changjin, the box office champion in mainland China in 2021 (it took 19 days and 9 hours), and surpassed the total box office of the first Ne Zha film, becoming the highest grossing animated film in mainland China. The Ne Zha film series also became the second film series to exceed 10 billion yuan (US$1.37 billion) with just two movies, and the box office exceeded 6 billion on the ninth day of release.

As of 8 February 2025, the box office has exceeded 7.2 billion yuan, ranking first in the Chinese New Year period, surpassing Wolf Warrior 2 (2017) and The Battle at Lake Changjin (2021) to become the highest-grossing Chinese film of all time. On 8 February, the box office exceeded 7 billion yuan (US$958 million), becoming the 63rd film to cross the 7 billion yuan mark worldwide, and the first non-Hollywood film to do so. It also surpassed the single territory box office record of US$936.7 million set by Star Wars: The Force Awakens (2015), 11 days into its release. It became the highest-grossing animated film, surpassing Inside Out 2 (2024) in less than three weeks after its initial release. It marks the first non-American, non-English-language animated film to achieve this milestone and the second non-Disney animated film to be labeled as such after Shrek 2 (2004). Ne Zha 2 passed the $2 billion mark on 9 March 2025, becoming the first animated and non-American film to have done so, and the seventh overall. It is estimated the film sold over 327.5 million tickets at the global box office, including 325 million in China alone, making it the most-attended animated film in movie theaters in film history.

At its premiere in Los Angeles on 12 February, Grauman's Chinese Theatre sold out of tickets immediately upon release. The film grossed $7.2 million in its opening weekend in the United States, compared with its predecessor's $1.2 million opening weekend there.

Released in Singapore on 6 March, the film earned $300,000 Singapore dollars (US$225,000) on its first day. By the seventh day of release, the box office had surpassed $2.5 million Singapore dollars (US$1.875 million), breaking the records for the highest first-day and total box office earnings for a Chinese film in Singapore. On 29 March, the distributor, Clover Films, announced on social media that the total box office in Singapore had exceeded $6 million Singapore dollars (US$4.5 million).

=== Critical response ===
==== China ====
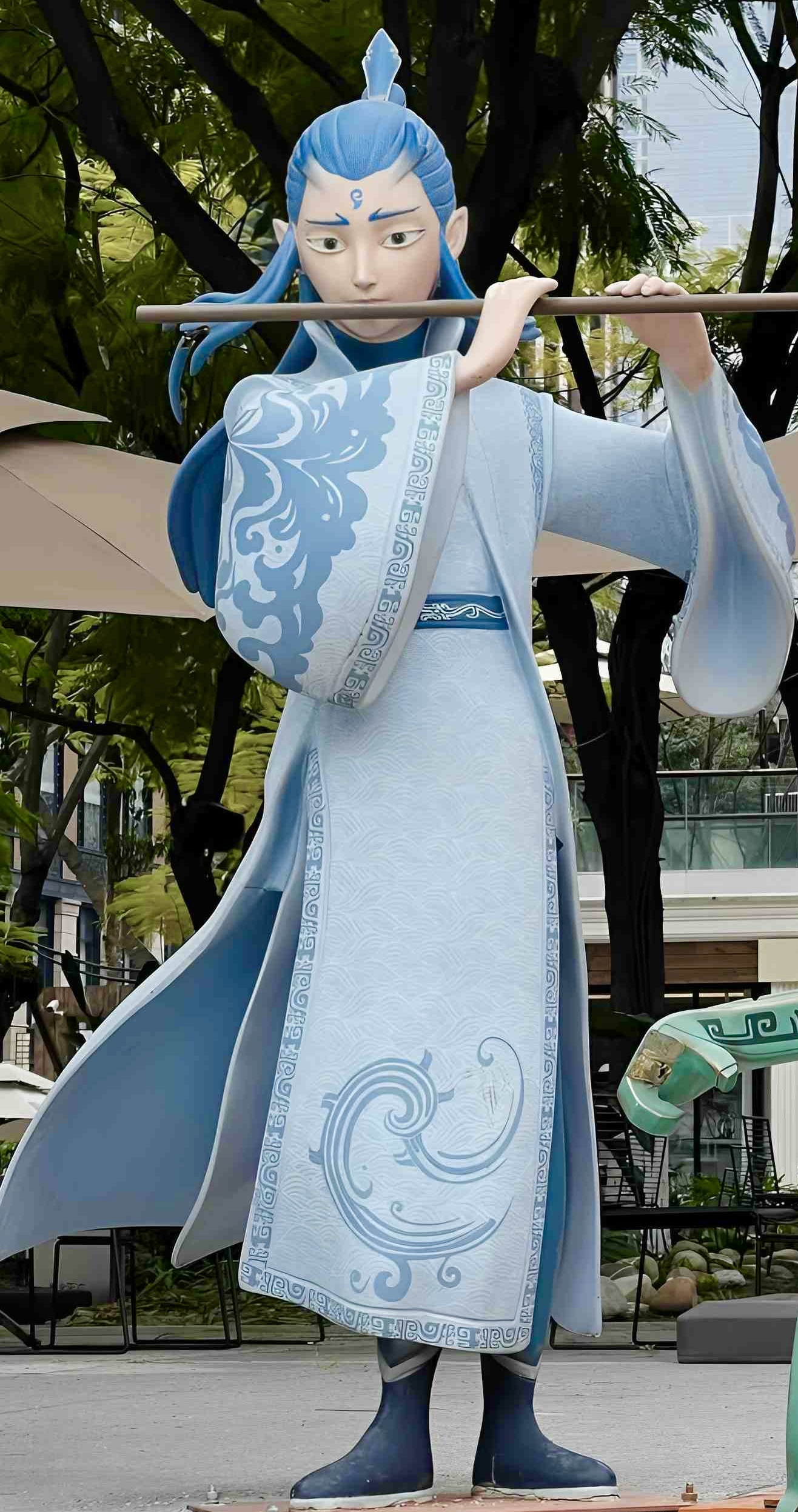
Sculpture of Ao Bing at the Chengdu Hi-tech Zone

Red Star News praised its special effects, script, and concept, and said that the film "uses a solid script and accurate expression of values, proving that 'respect for the audience' is the real box office password." Shangguan News praised the film for continuing the style and rhythm of the previous film, and the further improvement of the battle and special effects scenes, but criticized the lack of suspense in the plot.

The Macau Post Daily published an interview with Harald Brüning about the film. He commented:

On an international level, as far as the growing importance of China’s soft power is concerned, I believe that one day, Ne Zha can globally play an iconic role similar to the United States’ Mickey Mouse – a cartoon character and mascot co-created by Walt Disney in 1928.

Potentially, the many legends, novels and stories about Ne Zha offer an abundance of conceptional material to create many more movies for cinema release, TV and streaming – animated or live action – in the years to come to promote Chinese culture worldwide.

Besides, Ne Zha as a legendary, mystical and even spiritual figure has much more historic depth than Mickey Mouse, an anthropomorphic mouse characterised as an empathetic but fumbling underdog.

China needs to further strengthen its soft power efforts, considering the rise of the Global South and the West’s ambiguous response to it. Our mighty Ne Zha could certainly help.

==== Western ====
On the review aggregator website Rotten Tomatoes, 91% of 80 critics' reviews are positive. The website's consensus reads: "Visually spectacular with a hyperactive sense of humor, Ne Zha II is a sequel that supercharges the original's charms while still being accessible for the uninitiated." Metacritic, which uses a weighted average, assigned the film a score of 68 out of 100, based on 21 critics, indicating "generally favorable" reviews.

Danae Stahlnecker of Common Sense Media gave the film four out of five, saying: "stunning animated action adventure is an inspiring, heart-wrenching tale about how we all have the power to change our circumstances and make a better world". She praised the characters and story, and she concluded "Refreshingly, this sequel isn't just a franchise cash-grab. It's a thoughtful, well-crafted installment in an ongoing epic that deserves its global success."

=== Audience response ===
Ne Zha 2 was widely praised by Chinese audiences. Douban Movies scored the film 8.4/10, and the film also had an average rating of 9.7 out of 10 on Maoyan and 9.8 out of 10 on Taopiaopiao. The Atlantic, quoting Jenny Zhang of Slate, noted the wide range in reception from Chinese audiences.

=== Accolades ===
| Award | Date of ceremony | Category | Recipient(s) | Result | Ref. |
|---|---|---|---|---|---|
| Golden Rooster Awards | November 15, 2025 | Best Animation Film | Ne Zha 2 | Won | |
| Houston Film Critics Society | January 20, 2026 | Best Animated Feature | Ne Zha 2 | Nominated | |
| Saturn Awards | March 8, 2026 | Best International Animated Film | Ne Zha 2 | Nominated | |
| St. Louis Film Critics Association | December 14, 2025 | Best Animated Feature | Ne Zha 2 | Nominated | |

== Impact ==
The film's overwhelming success was widely noted by a variety of media outlets as unprecedented for Chinese and non-Hollywood cinema, several noting its implications for the movie industry as a whole. Many noted the success for the film was due to a variety of factors, such as fanfare and anticipation from fans due to the first film, its release timing around the holiday, word of mouth from the general public, and pride over the development and subsequent successes of Chinese animated blockbusters over the years, as exemplified by recent films such as Monkey King: Hero Is Back, Big Fish & Begonia, White Snake, Ne Zha, (both 2019) Jiang Ziya, I Am What I Am, Deep Sea, Chang'an (both 2023) Boonie Bears: Time Twist, Nobody, The Girl Who Stole Time, A Story About Fire (both 2025) All Wishes Come True! and Niu Lai (both 2026). After the film was released, its box office continued to rise due to excellent word of mouth. Many took to social media to voice that it was difficult to get tickets to the film. Netizens took to the producers' social media to call for more showings to be scheduled to meet the audience's viewing needs. In some areas, midnight showings were completely full, which was noted as a rare phenomenon.

The success of Ne Zha 2 led several commentators calling it a milestone for international cinema. Many netizens took to social media to voice pride for the film's success. Simultaneously, the film inspired direct comparisons between it and Captain America: Brave New World (2025), which was released in China around the same time. The latter's negative word-of-mouth from ticket buyers on ticketing websites caused it to massively decline in box office performance in the country. The dissident website China Digital Times claims that negative articles and reporting toward Ne Zha 2 have been heavily censored in mainland China.

As of 6 March 2025, less than two percent of ticket sales had come outside mainland China with the movie's opening in five markets. Ne Zha 2 has seen particular popularity among the Chinese diaspora in various countries such as Australia, New Zealand, and North America. It was reported the film inspired New Zealand viewers to visit China, with many lauding the film's presentation and depictions of Chinese culture.

Due to the film's box office performance, the film's producer and distributor, Enlight Media, saw its shares rise by the daily limit after the Chinese New Year.

=== Merchandise ===
Official merchandise associated with the film became best-selling across stores in China; many stores reported that Ne Zha 2 products completely sold out. After the film's release, sales of Ne Zha merchandises exceeded 50 million yuan online on e-commerce platform Taobao. Within two weeks of the film's release, over 400 million yuan in sales were generated from branded merchandise.

== Sequel ==
Wang Changtain, chairman of Beijing Enlight Pictures, has confirmed that a direct sequel is currently in development, describing it as "more ambitious" and estimating that it could take 5 years to complete.
