= Lady Yin =

- Investiture of the Gods character
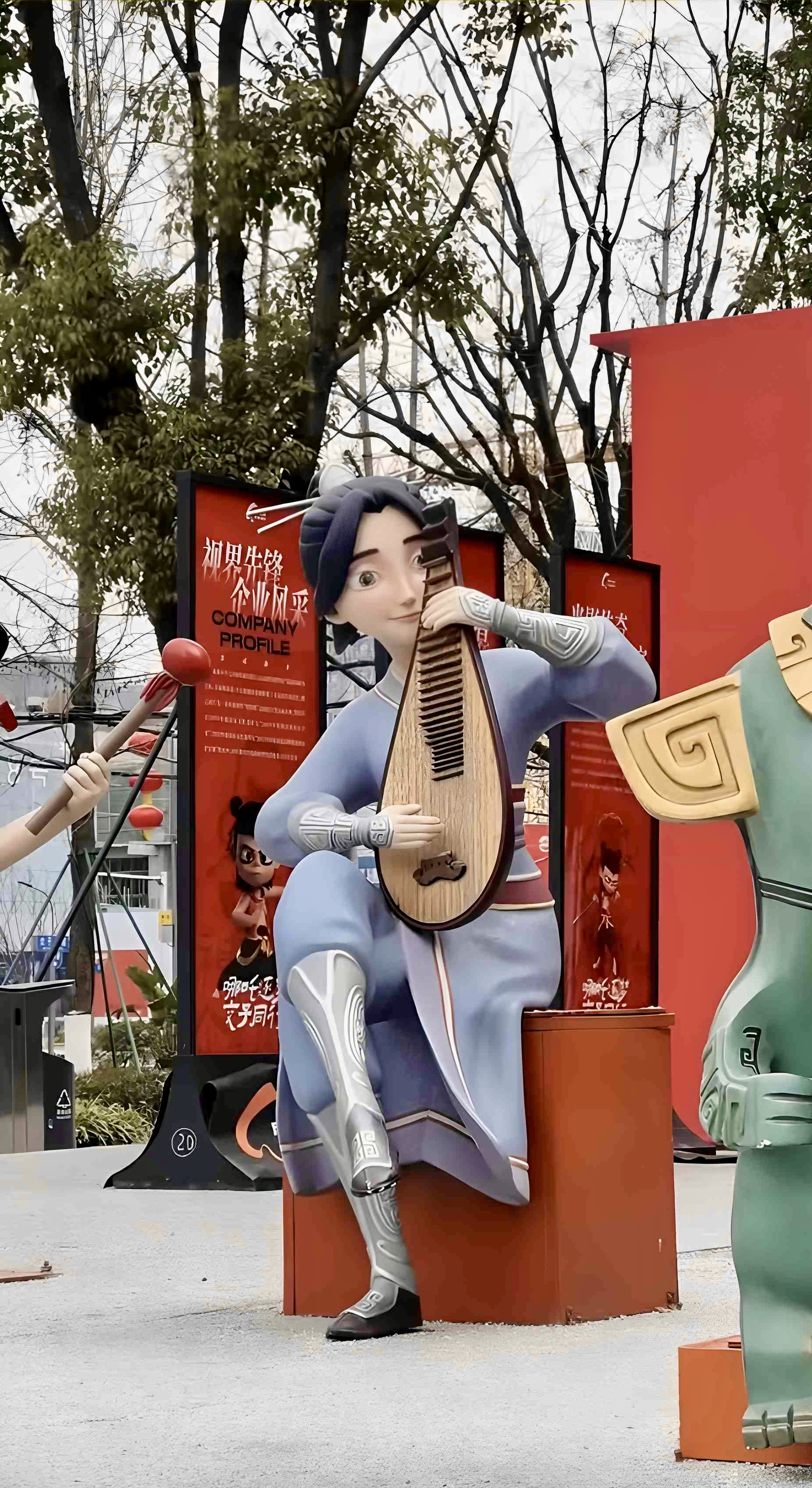
- A sculpture of Lady Yin as depicted in Ne Zha, located in the Chengdu Hi-tech Zone

In-universe information
- Species: Human (in Investiture of the Gods); Deity (in Xinchu Erlang Pishan Jiumu Quanduan)
- Gender: Female
- Family: Jade Emperor (father) (in Xinchu Erlang Pishan Jiumu Quanduan)
- Spouse: Li Jing
- Children: Jinzha, Muzha, Nezha, Li Zhenying (in Journey to the west)
- Home: Chentangguan

Lady Yin (Chinese: 殷夫人; pinyin: Yīn Fūrén) is a character in the Chinese novel Fengshen Yanyi. She is the wife of Li Jing and the mother of Jinzha, Muzha, and Nezha. She loves Nezha and tries to protect him when he gets into trouble.

In the Qing dynasty folk text Xinchu Erlang Pishan Jiumu Quanduan (新出二郎劈山救母全段), Lady Yin is the second daughter of the Jade Emperor. In Fengshen Yanyi, however, she is a human woman living near the end of the Shang dynasty.

The novel does not give her personal name and calls her only Lady Yin. In the Ming dynasty text The Collection of Gods in Three Religions, Nezha's mother is called Suzhi Furen (素知夫人).

== Origin ==
In early Buddhist texts, Nezha is a son of Vaiśravaṇa, the Northern Heavenly King. Vaiśravaṇa later became the model for the Chinese Pagoda-Bearing Heavenly King Li Jing. Some Buddhist traditions name Jixiang Tiannü (吉祥天女) as Vaiśravaṇa's wife, while others call her his sister.

An earlier account of Nezha's mother appears in the Yuan dynasty text Xinbian Lianxiang Soushen Guangji (新編連相搜神廣記), which calls her Suzhi Furen (素知夫人). The same name appears in the The Collection of Gods in Three Religions.

In Investiture of the Gods, she is called Lady Yin (殷氏). She is Li Jing's first wife and has two sons, Jinzha and Muzha, before giving birth to Nezha. Her personal name is not given. In Journey to the West, Li Jing has three sons and a daughter named Li Zhenying (李貞英), but the novel does not name their mother.

In a Qing dynasty folk song, Xinchu Erlang Pishan Jiumu Quanduan (新出二郎劈山救母全段), the Jade Emperor has nine daughters. His second daughter marries Li Jing and gives birth to Jinzha, Muzha, and Nezha. His third daughter marries Yang Tianyou and becomes the mother of Erlang Shen.

Another version appears in the Jinhu folk play Guanyang Dudou (关杨赌斗). It calls Li Jing's wife Jinhua Gongzhu (金花公主, "Princess Golden Flower"), the eldest daughter of the Jade Emperor and the Queen Mother of the West. Her younger sister Yinhua Gongzhu (银花公主) marries the Dragon King of the Eastern Sea. Their sister Baihua Gongzhu (白花公主) marries Yang Tianyou and gives birth to Erlang Shen.

In the traditional errenzhuan (二人转) play Pishan Jiumu (劈山救母), Li Jing's wife is called Qinglian Gongzhu (青莲公主, "Princess Green Lotus"). She is the Jade Emperor's second daughter and gives birth to Jinzha, Muzha, and Nezha. Her younger sister, Bailian Gongzhu (白莲公主), is the mother of Erlang Shen.

== In Fengshen Yanyi ==
In the Ming dynasty novel Fengshen Yanyi, Lady Yin is the wife of Li Jing and the mother of Jinzha, Muzha, and Nezha. The story takes place near the end of the Shang dynasty. Lady Yin is pregnant with Nezha for three years and six months. One night, she dreams of a Taoist priest who places something in her arms. She wakes up and soon gives birth to a ball of flesh in the incense chamber. Li Jing cuts open the ball with his sword, and a child comes out. The child is later named Nezha by Taiyi Zhenren.

Lady Yin loves Nezha and tries to protect him when Li Jing becomes angry with him. After Nezha kills Ao Bing, the third son of Ao Guang, the Dragon Kings threaten his family. Nezha kills himself to save his parents. His spirit later appears to Lady Yin in her dreams and asks her to build a temple on Cuiping Mountain so that he can receive offerings. At first, she does not agree, but Nezha continues to appear in her dreams. She eventually pays for the temple and a statue of Nezha without telling Li Jing. When Li Jing discovers the temple, he destroys the statue and burns the building.

== Later traditions ==
In Xixia County, Henan, a local legend says that Lady Yin asked for a temple to be built for her son Nezha. After Nezha gave his flesh and bones back to his parents, Taiyi Zhenren brought him back to life with a body made from lotus flowers. Lady Yin then proposed building the Great Compassion Temple (大悲寺, Dabei Si) in his honour. The temple stood near Kuiwen Village (奎文村) and later became known as the Great Wealth Temple (大貴寺, Dagui Si).

Nezha Palace (哪吒行宮) stands on Cuiping Mountain in Yibin, Sichuan. According to local tradition, Lady Yin built a temple there for her son Nezha. The present temple was rebuilt in 1991 and attracts worshippers from China and overseas.

Zhang Zhihe and Yuan Yuhan suggest that Lady Yin may have belonged to the Shang royal family. They note that the name Yin (殷) also appears in the names of King Zhou's sons, Yin Jiao and Yin Hong. They believe she may have been a Shang princess. However, Fengshen Yanyi does not name her parents or say that she is related to King Zhou.

== Interpretations ==
Zhang Yan and Wang Min argue that in Fengshen Yanyi, Lady Yin supports Li Jing when Nezha angers the Dragon King. Both parents expect Nezha to obey them. The scholars also compare Lady Yin with Nüwa in the 2003 animated series The Legend of Nezha. Nüwa cares for humanity, while Lady Yin cares for her son. They see both as mother figures who help Nezha grow up.

Wang Zheng describes Lady Yin as a loving mother who has little power in Li Jing's household. She cares for Nezha but is also expected to obey her husband. Wang argues that she is caught between her love for her son and her duty to Li Jing. He sees the family in the novel as one in which the father holds most of the authority.

Chen Hong argues that Li Jing's treatment of Nezha helps explain why Nezha later turns against his father. Lady Yin builds a temple for Nezha after his death, but Li Jing destroys it because he fears losing his official position. Chen sees this as an important reason for Nezha's anger. He argues that the novel is more sympathetic to Nezha than to his father.

Zhang and Wang also discuss changes in Lady Yin's character in modern animation. In the 2019 film Ne Zha, she is more outspoken and independent. She sometimes loses her temper and makes mistakes, but still loves her son. The scholars argue that this version is closer to an ordinary mother than the ideal mother found in older stories.

== Worship ==
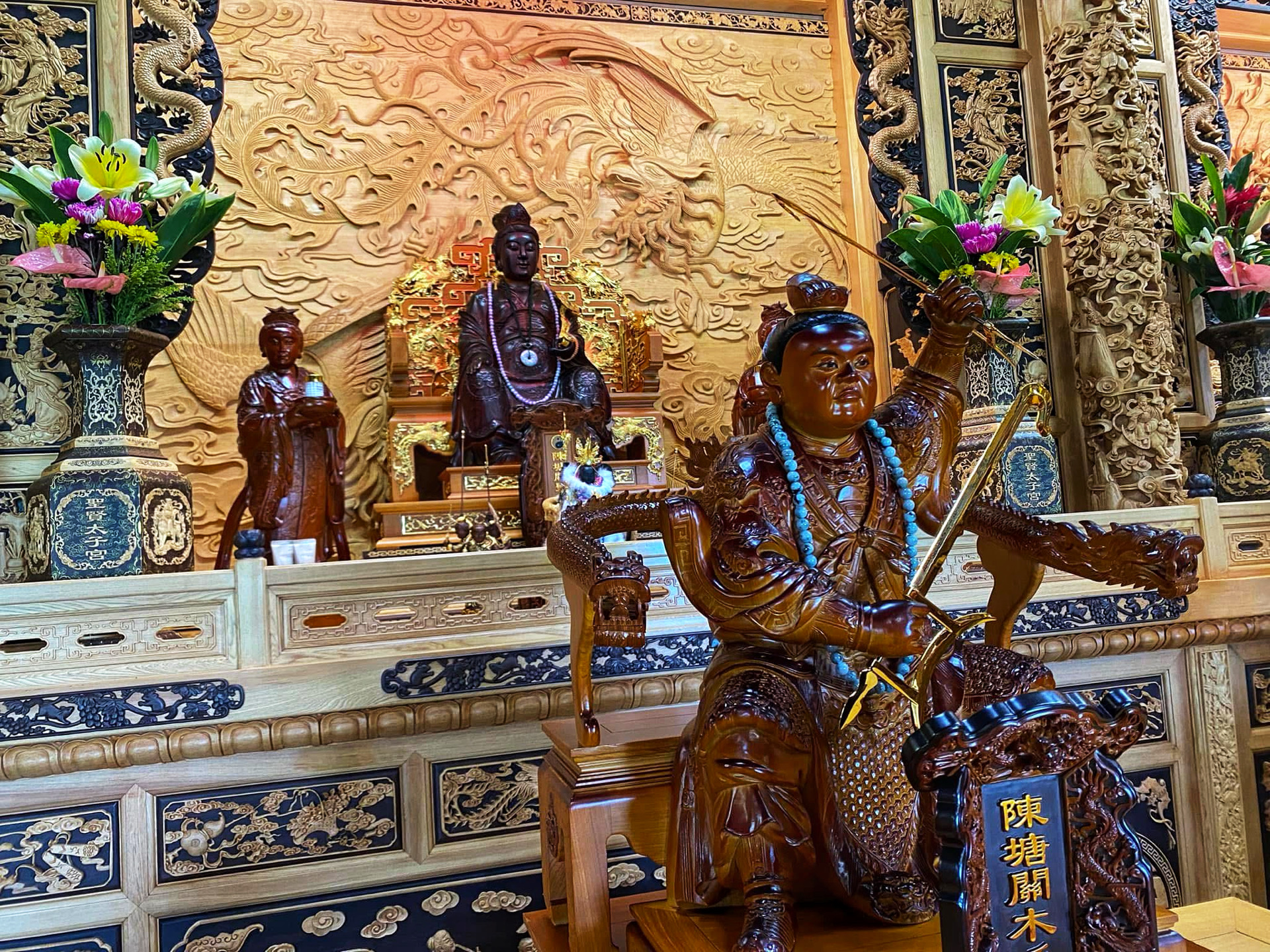
Lady Yin statue (behind) at Shengxian Taizi Temple in Puli, Taiwan.

Lady Yin is worshipped in some Taiwanese temples alongside Li Jing and their sons, Jinzha, Muzha, and Nezha. Jinlong Temple (金龍宮) in Taitung City worships Jinzha as its main deity. The temple also enshrines his parents, Lady Yin, known there as Yin Nai Furen (殷奶夫人), and the Pagoda-Bearing Heavenly King Li Jing. The temple was founded among the local Amis community and has both Indigenous and Han Chinese religious traditions.

Shengxian Taizi Temple (聖賢太子宮) in Puli, Nantou County, also worships Lady Yin. She is called Cimu Yin Furen (慈母殷夫人, "Compassionate Mother Lady Yin"). The temple's main hall enshrines her with Li Jing and several forms of Nezha. Other deities worshipped there include Taiyi Zhenren, Jinzha, and Muzha.

Lady Yin is also said to be worshipped as Yin Furen of Cuiping Mountain (翠屏山殷夫人) at Yangshan Buddhist Hall (陽山佛堂) in Liuying District, Tainan.

== In popular culture ==
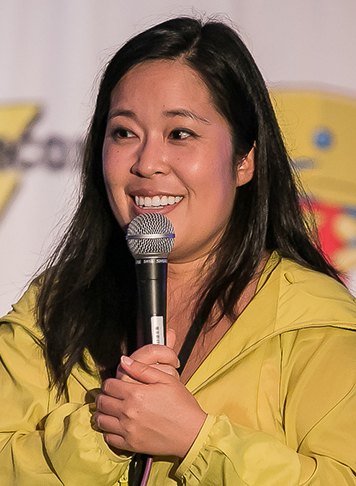
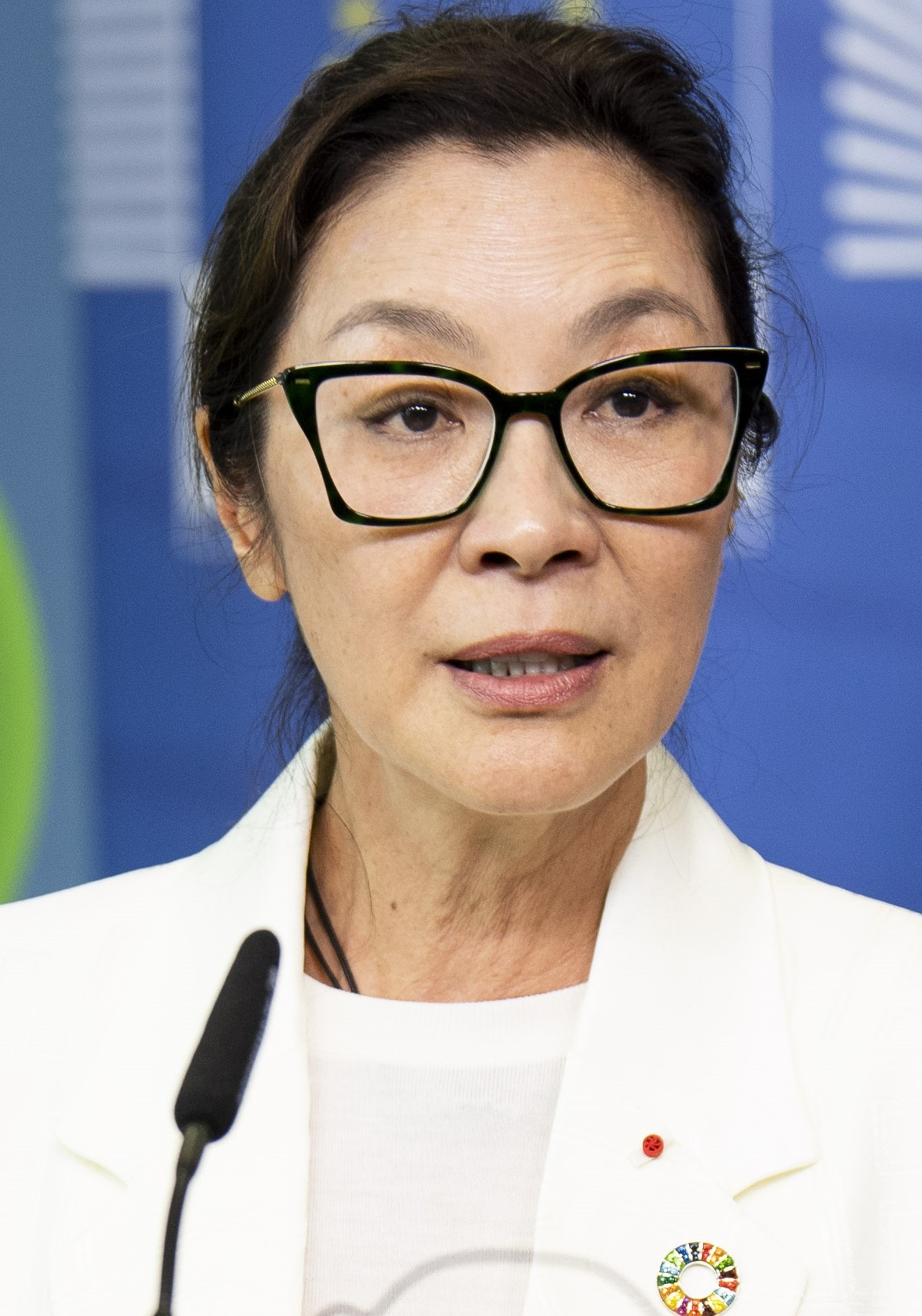
Stephanie Sheh (left) and Michelle Yeoh (right) voiced Lady Yin in the English dubs of Ne Zha and Ne Zha 2, respectively.

Lady Yin has appeared in several television adaptations of the Nezha story. In the 1999 television series Lianhua Tongzi Nezha (莲花童子哪吒), she was played by Ding Lan (丁岚). In this version, she dies while protecting Nezha from Li Jing.

In the 2001 Hong Kong television series Gods of Honour (封神榜), Yuen King-tan played Lady Yin under the name Yin Shiniang (殷十娘). Her relationship with Nezha, played by Benny Chan Ho Man, is an important part of the series. Yuen's performance became well known among Hong Kong audiences. In 2022, she recreated a scene from the series in which Yin Shiniang slaps the Pipa Spirit.

Tang Dehui (唐德惠) also played Yin Shiniang in the 2014 Chinese television series Fengshen Yingxiong Bang (封神英雄榜).

Lady Yin is a major supporting character in the animated film Ne Zha (2019) and its sequel Ne Zha 2 (2025). In these films, she helps Li Jing defend Chentang Pass and tries to protect their son from the people who fear him. She is voiced by Lü Qi (绿绮) in the original Chinese versions of both films.

Stephanie Sheh voiced Lady Yin in the English dub of Ne Zha. Michelle Yeoh took over the role in the English dub of Ne Zha 2, released in August 2025. Both films broke box-office records. Ne Zha became the highest-grossing Chinese animated film at the time of its release, while Ne Zha 2 became the highest-grossing animated film worldwide.

A character named Lady Yin Saikhara also appears in R. F. Kuang's fantasy novel The Dragon Republic (2019), the second book in The Poppy War trilogy. She is the wife of Yin Vaisra and the mother of four children named Jinzha, Muzha, Nezha, and Mingzha. The first three names also belong to Lady Yin's sons in Fengshen Yanyi, although Muzha is a daughter in Kuang's novel.
