= Shiji Niangniang =

Goddess in Chinese religion and Taoism

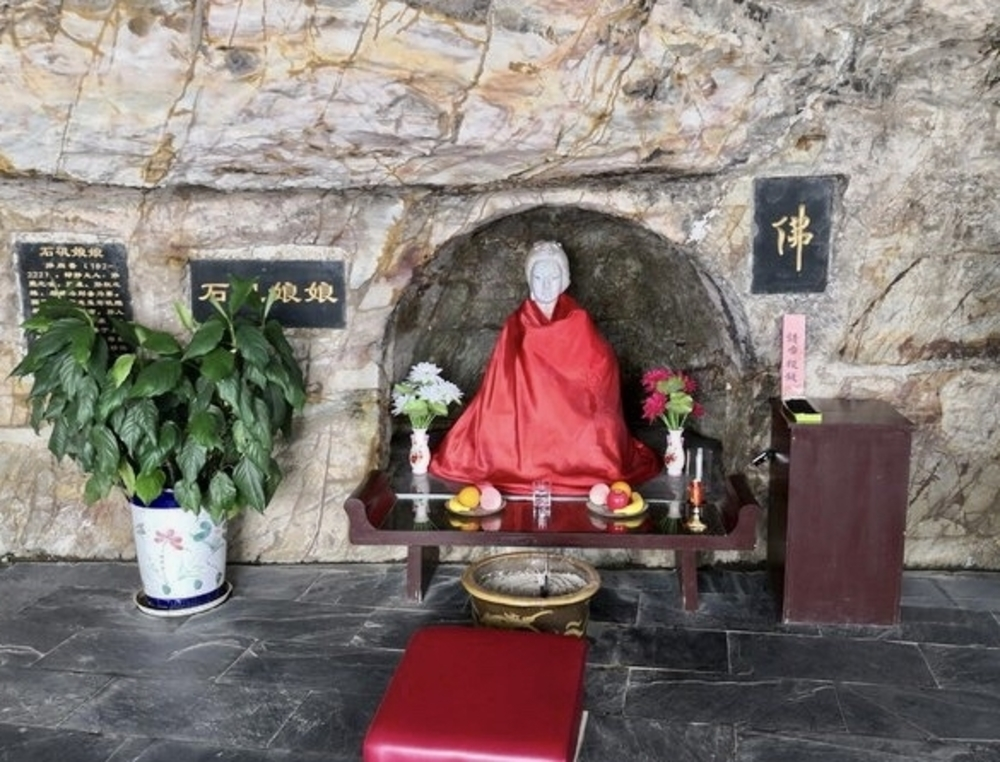
- Statue of Shiji Niangniang at the Sanyuan Cave Temple
- Traditional Chinese: 石磯娘娘
- Simplified Chinese: 石矶娘娘
- Literal meaning: Lady Rock
Transcriptions
Standard Mandarin
- Hanyu Pinyin: Shíjī Niángniáng
- Wade–Giles: Shih^{2}-chi^{1} Niang^{2}-Niang^{2}
Yue: Cantonese
- Jyutping: Sek6 Gei1 Noeng4 Noeng4

Shiji Niangniang (Chinese: 石磯娘娘; lit. 'Lady Rock') is a character in the 16th-century Chinese novel, Fengshen Yanyi. She was a 10,000-year-old yaoguai, originally a stone, born outside the heavens and the earth during the Chaos and Xuanhuang eras. Shiji is worshipped as a deity in Chinese folk religion.

She also appeared in the religious compendium Sanjiao Soushen Daquan (Compendium of Information on the Gods of the Three Religions, 三教搜神大全).

== Origin ==
In the Southern Song dynasty text Yijianzhi by Hong Mai, there is a record of the deity Nezha subduing a stone spirit. This stone spirit is likely the earliest prototype and origin of Shiji.

In the religious compendium Sanjiao Soushen Daquan from the Yuan and Ming dynasties, it is indirectly renamed "Shiji", while "Shiji" is the name used in the Ming and Qing dynasty novel Fengshen Yanyi. In other words, the original prototype of Shiji was a stone spirit.

In Yijianzhi, a Taoist priest killed her using Nezha's fire spell. This is why later authors linked Shiji with Nezha, indirectly leading to the creation of derivative fan fiction works. In film and television series featuring Nezha as the protagonist, Shiji is portrayed as a demonic figure based on the depiction in the Sanjiao Soushen Daquan.

== In Fengshen Yanyi ==
The Chinese classical novel Fengshen Yanyi states that Shiji was originally a natural stone that received the essence of the sun and the moon. Shiji is said to have been born beyond the cosmos and became a divine spirit by undergoing the conditions of earth, water, fire and air. After 10,000 years of cultivation, this stubborn stone is said to have finally become a human figure by spiritual processes.

Shiji was later accepted by the heavenly master Tongtian Jiaozhu as a student. After attaining Taoism, it still took thousands of years to practice. Although the speed of her practice was very slow, because of countless years of efforts, Shiji developed a profound understanding of Tao. As far as her comprehensive strength is concerned, it is still above Taiyi Zhenren.

Shiji lives in the White Bone Cave of Skull Mountain, and she had two apprentices under the gate, namely, Biyun Tongzi (碧雲童子) and Caiyun Tong'er (彩雲童兒). One day, Nezha shot an arrow and unintentionally killed the gatekeeper Biyun Tongzi. Shiji came to seek revenge for the death of Biyun Tongzi by killing Nezha and his father Li Jing. Nezha could not beat Shiji and his master Taiyi Zhenren came to protect him. Taiyi attacked Shiji and burned her with Nine-dragon-fire-net (九龍神火罩). While trapped in this net, Taiyi summoned several dragons which unleashed a large volley of fire into the net; instantly killing Shiji and turning her back into her original form as a molten rock. She was appointed as the Yue Youxingjun (月遊星君 "Moon-Wandering Star Lord") in the end.

== Overview ==
Shiji, although on the side of law and order, is depicted as rigid and lacking compassion. Moreover, although divine, both Ao Guang and Shiji are demonic figures in the Fengshen Yanyi. Nezha's crimes against them are accidental, and he defends himself—albeit excessively—from their aggressive attempts to punish him. In line with preceding argument, one might also view these circumstances as contributing to the author's careful construction of a sympathy path for Nezha.

Shiji is also related to the stones born from the heaven and earth of Sun Wukong or Jia Baoyu.

== Worship ==
Shiji is worshipped in Chinese folk religion and is called "Shiji Niangniang" or Yue Youxingjun (月遊星君 "Moon-Wandering Star Lord")

Located in Caishiji, five miles southwest of Ma'anshan City, the Sanyuan Dong Cave Temple (三元洞) is enshrined the statue of Shiji.

== In popular culture ==
- Portrayed by Stephanie Hsu in 2023 television series American Born Chinese Here, her name is spelled as Shu Ji.
- In the 2003 Chinese animated fantasy television series The Legend Of Nezha, she is depicted as one of the main antagonists of the series.
- In the sequel Ne Zha 2, she is eventually defeated by Nezha as the completion of the third trial set up by Wuliang Tianzun.
- She is also a playable character in the game Dislyte, Extraordinary ones, Fantastic beast legend and Idle arena: Chaos impact.
