= Ne Zha (2019 film) =

2019 Chinese animated film by Jiaozi

Ne Zha (哪吒)
- Theatrical release poster
- Chinese: 哪吒之魔童降世
- Literal meaning: Nezha: The Demon Boy Descends to Earth
- Hanyu Pinyin: Nézhā zhī Mó tóng Jiàngshì
- Directed by: Jiaozi
- Screenplay by: Jiaozi
- Story by: Yi Qiao; Wei Yunyun
- Based on: Investiture of the Gods by Xu Zhonglin
- Produced by: Wei Yunyun; Liu Wenzhang
- Starring: Lü Yanting; Joseph Cao; Han Mo; Chen Hao; Lü Qi; Zhang Jiaming; Yang Wei
- Music by: Wan Pin Chu
- Production companies: Chengdu Coco Cartoon; Beijing Enlight Pictures
- Distributed by: Beijing Enlight Pictures(China); Well Go USA Entertainment (United States)
- Release dates: 11 July 2019 (Beijing); 13 July 2019 (IMAX, CFGS); 26 July 2019 (China)
- Running time: 110 minutes
- Country: China
- Language: Mandarin
- Budget: $22 million
- Box office: $742.7 million

Ne Zha (/ˈneɪ.ʒə/; (Note: As pronounced in the official English dub.) Chinese pronunciation: [nɤ˧˥.ʈʂa˥]; (Note: As pronounced in the original movie.) Chinese: 哪吒之魔童降世; pinyin: Nézhā zhī Mótóng Jiàngshì), also spelled Nezha, (Note: The title is romanized as Ne Zha on the film's title card but as "Nezha" in the official English subtitles when referring to the character, and also on the U.S. poster and in the U.S. trailer.) is a 2019 Chinese animated fantasy adventure film directed and written by Jiaozi. Produced by the director's own Chengdu Coco Cartoon, it features the popular Chinese mythological character Nezha. The plot is loosely based on the 16th-century novel Investiture of the Gods by Xu Zhonglin. In the film, a young boy named Ne Zha is the reincarnation of the demon orb, which is separated from the chaos pearl by the Primeval Lord of Heaven, Yuanshi Tianzun. Born with the destructive powers of a demon orb, he finds himself as an outcast who is hated and feared by the townsfolk in Chengtang Pass. Destined by prophecy to bring destruction to the world, the young lad must choose between good and evil in order to break the shackles of fate and become the hero.

Ne Zha was released in China exclusively in IMAX and China Film Giant Screen theatres on 13 July 2019, followed by other theatres on 26 July, distributed by Beijing Enlight Pictures. It is the first Chinese-produced animated feature released in IMAX format, and, despite being the debut feature of its director and animation studio and having no widely known actors in its voice cast, the film gained critical acclaim and has been one of the biggest commercial successes in Chinese cinema, setting numerous records for box office grosses, including becoming the highest-grossing animated film in China, the highest-grossing film of 2019 in China (also the first animated film to achieve this milestone), the worldwide highest-grossing non-U.S. animated film, and the worldwide second-highest-grossing non-English-language film of all time at the time of its release. With a gross of over $742 million, it was that year's fourth-highest-grossing animated film and China's all time fifth-highest-grossing film.

It began a North American release on 29 August in select IMAX 3D theatres, before a nationwide rollout on 6 September. It was selected as the Chinese entry for Best International Feature Film at the 92nd Academy Awards, becoming the first animated film from China to ever do so, but it was ultimately not nominated.

A second film set in the same universe, titled Jiang Ziya, was released on 1 October 2020, during National Day in China. A direct sequel, Ne Zha 2, was released on 29 January 2025, which broke multiple box-office records and stands as the highest-grossing animated film of all time.

== Plot ==
A Chaos Pearl, birthed from the primordial essences of heaven and earth, begins siphoning energies gluttonously. The Supreme Lord Yuanshi Tianzun dispatches his disciples Taiyi Zhenren and Shen Gongbao to subdue the sentient pearl, but they are unable to due to its ability to absorb energy. Using the Seven-Colored Sacred Lotus, Tianzun separates the pearl into two opposite components: the Spirit Pearl and the Demon Orb. He then places a heavenly curse of lightning upon the Demon Orb that will destroy it in three years time, and instructs Taiyi to take the Spirit Pearl to be reincarnated as the third son of Li Jing in the town of Chentang Pass; the son will be named Ne Zha.

Motivated by jealousy, Shen steals the Spirit Pearl and causes Li Jing's pregnant wife Lady Yin to give birth to Ne Zha as the reincarnation of the Demon Orb. Taiyi tells them that Ne Zha's fate is sealed: in three years' time the heavenly curse placed upon the Demonic Orb will kill him, so Li travels to Heaven with Taiyi in an attempt to plead for Ne Zha's life, but is told the curse is irremovable.

Meanwhile, Shen brings the stolen Spirit Pearl to the Dragon King of the East Sea. The Dragon King infuses the Spirit Pearl into an egg, giving birth to his third son Ao Bing whom the Dragon King allows Shen to take as a disciple. The dragons resent how they are confined to the ocean floor by the Heavenly Court, and hope that because Ao Bing is born from the Spirit Pearl, they will be allowed to leave.

To tame his demonic nature and make him happy, Ne Zha's parents lie to him, telling him he was born of the Spirit Pearl and is destined to be a great demon hunter, while enlisting two boundary beasts to keep him from leaving their property. Ne Zha studies under Taiyi and acquires great skills, but is still not allowed to hunt demons. Becoming impatient, he escapes his confines to hunt demons on his own. While chasing an aquatic yaksha trying to devour a little girl, Ne Zha burns down a fishing village. Ao Bing joins Ne Zha's fight but is petrified by the yaksha. Ne Zha cleverly defeats the yaksha and rescues both Ao Bing and the little girl, and he and Ao Bing become friends. However, his actions are misunderstood by the townsfolk of the destroyed village, who attack Ne Zha until Ne Zha's parents and Tai Yi arrive to stop the fight. After Li learns it was all just a misunderstanding, he plans to prove Ne Zha's innocence on his upcoming birthday party.

Ten days later, the Li household organizes a lavish birthday party for their son, inviting the townsfolk to attend while the boundary beasts keep an eye on the captive yaksha. Shen visits Ne Zha before the party and reveals the truth of Ne Zha's nature to him. Furious at his parents' deception, Ne Zha unleashes his true demonic form and nearly kills his father until Ao Bing intervenes. Feeling betrayed, Ne Zha leaves to await his fate.

While thanking Ao Bing, Li discovers he is a dragon and the reincarnation of the Spirit Pearl. Knowing that if this is revealed, all of dragon kind will be condemned forever, Ao Bing acts on Shen's command, creating a massive sheet of ice above the town, intending to bury the town and eliminate all witnesses. Meanwhile, Ne Zha learns that when his father visited Heaven to plead for his life, he accepted an enchantment that would allow him to trade his life for Ne Zha's. Moved by his father's sacrifice, Ne Zha returns to the village to stop Ao Bing. Unleashing his full demonic form, Ne Zha defeats Ao Bing, but spares his life for being his only friend.

When the heavenly lightning approaches, Ne Zha surrenders to his fate but is unexpectedly joined by Ao Bing. Linking hands, they unleash the Chaos Pearl's ability to absorb energy. Their mortal bodies cannot withstand the full energy of the strike and are destroyed, but with Taiyi's help, they survive as spirits. The citizens of Chentang Pass approach and kneel in gratitude to the two for saving them.

In the mid-credits scene, the Dragon King vows vengeance on Chentang Pass for what happened to Ao Bing. The other three Dragon Kings of the Four Seas appear and use this as an opportunity to make a deal with him. Meanwhile, in an unknown location, a sneak peek of the movie Jiang Ziya is introduced.

== Voice cast ==
=== Mandarin Chinese ===
- Lü Yanting as child Ne Zha, son of Li Jing and Lady Yin
  - Joseph Cao (囧森瑟夫) as adolescent Ne Zha
- Han Mo as Ao Bing, the Dragon King's third son
- Chen Hao as Li Jing, Ne Zha's father and the village chief who governs Chentang Pass
- Lü Qi as Lady Yin, Ne Zha's mother and the chieftess who also governs Chentang Pass
- Zhang Jiaming as Taiyi Zhenren, Ne Zha's master, a Taoist immortal who lives on the Kunlun
- He Yuxiang as Yuanshi Tianzun, the Supreme Lord of Heaven who Taiyi and Shen work for
- Yang Wei as Shen Gongbao, an Indochinese leopard spirit who is Taiyi's brother and Ao Bing's master
- Li Nan as Ao Guang, the Dragon King of the East Sea
- Mo Qian as Chang Shengyun, a cloud spirit who works for Yuanshi
- Ren Jungpeng as the Sea Yaksha, a monster who can turn into water and shoot petrifying bubbles
- Joseph Cao as Boundary Beast #1, one of two barrier-controlling creatures enlisted by Taiyi to protect Li Jing's house and keep Ne Zha in
- He Yuxiang as Boundary Beast #2, one of two barrier-controlling creatures enlisted by Taiyi to protect Li Jing's house and keep Ne Zha in
- Tao Yuan as Li Xing, a servant of Li Jing and Lady Yin
- Liu Menghan as Bully #1, the leader of the bullies that try to cause trouble for Ne Zha
- Slayerboom (Da Hai) as Ao Shun, the Dragon King of the North Sea
- Zhu Zhen as Ao Qin, the Dragon King of the South Sea
- Xing Liner as Ao Run, the Dragon Queen of the West Sea

=== English ===
- Jordan Cole as Ne Zha
  - Griffin Puatu as adolescent Ne Zha
  - Lexi Foley as infant Ne Zha
- Aleks Le as Ao Bing
- Vincent Rodriguez III as Li Jing
- Stephanie Sheh as Lady Yin
- Mike Pollock as Taiyi Zhenren
- Daniel Riordan as Shen Gongbao
- Lexi Foley as Yaya
- Matthew Moy as Boundary Beast #1
- Jamieson Price as Yuanshi Tianzun
- Adam Sietz as the Sea Yaksha
- Dana Snyder as Cheng Shengyun
- Christopher Swindle as Ao Guang

=== Cantonese ===
- Stella Fung as Ne Zha
  - Alex Ho Wai Shing as adolescent Ne Zha
- Ryan Kan as Ao Bing
- Ray Yuen Tak Kei as Li Jing
- Chin Wai-ling as Lady Yin
- Rocky Lee as Shen Gongbao
- Tam Hon Wa as Taiyi Zhenren
- Li Ka Fai as Yuanshi Tianzun
- Alex Ho Wai Shing as the Dragon King

== Crew work ==
=== English dub ===
- Stephanie Sheh - Voice Director

== Production ==
=== Inspiration ===
The film tells the mythological origins of Nezha, who is a protection deity in Chinese folk religion, and its story is loosely based on the literary version of the myth that forms two chapters of Investiture of the Gods, a Ming-dynasty shenmo novel, traditionally attributed to Xu Zhonglin, which incorporates various existing myths into a wider narrative.

The story has been adapted for the screen many times before, at least as early as 1927 or 1928, whether on its own (as in the 1979 traditionally-animated film Nezha Conquers the Dragon King) or as part of adaptations of the whole of Investiture of the Gods (such as the 2016 live-action film League of Gods).

=== Pre-production ===
Director Jiaozi spent two years in total to write the screenplay, and the film was in production for three years.

=== Animation production ===
The film has more than 1,318 special effects shots, and it took over 20 Chinese special effects studios, employing more than 1,600 people, to realize the film's fairy tale setting, the mysterious Dragon King's Palace, and a complex fight between fire and water. One scene alone took two months to complete. Digital tools such as Autodesk Maya, Adobe software, and Nuke were used.

== Release ==
=== Theatrical ===
==== Domestic ====
Executive production company and distributor Beijing Enlight Pictures premiered Ne Zha on 11 July 2019 in Beijing, followed by an encore on 12 July. The film was given a limited release in IMAX and China Film Giant Screen premium large format theatres on 13 July, and was released nationwide on 26 July.

==== International ====
The film was released in cinemas in English-speaking regions in Mandarin with English subtitles around the end of August and beginning of September 2019.

It was released in Australia on 23 August and in New Zealand on 29 August, distributed by CMC Pictures. It was released in the United States and Canada in select IMAX 3D venues on 29 August, followed by other cinemas on 6 September, distributed by Well Go USA Entertainment. It was released in the United Kingdom and Ireland, including in select IMAX 3D venues, on 30 August, distributed by CMC Pictures in collaboration with Cine Asia.

== Reception ==
=== Box office ===
The film grossed 600 million yuan (est. $84 million) in its first three days alone. It broke local records with a $91.5 million opening, the highest ever for an animated film in China.

On 2 August 2019, Ne Zha became the highest-grossing animated film of all time in China, a record held by Zootopia ($235.6 million) since 2016. On 7 August 2019, Ne Zha became the fastest animated film to reach $400 million (in 12 days). It is currently the highest-grossing animated film of all time in a single market ($703.71 million in China) overtaking Incredibles 2 ($608.5 million in North America), the highest-grossing non-Disney or Pixar animated film in a single market, overtaking Shrek 2 ($441.2 million in North America), and the highest-grossing non-English spoken animated film, overtaking Spirited Away ($361.1 million worldwide). Upon reaching $700 million (in 46 days), it became the first animated feature film in film history to reach that milestone in a single market.

=== Critical response ===
The film gained highly positive reviews from critics. Douban, a Chinese media rating site, gave the film 8.4 out of 10. The review aggregator Rotten Tomatoes reported that 88% of critics have given the film a positive review based on 17 reviews, with an average rating of 7.2/10. On Metacritic, the film has a weighted average score of 56 out of 100 based on 6 critics, indicating "mixed or average reviews".

=== Scholarly reception ===
According to Yoo Sumin, the film is popular because it made Nezha meaningful to contemporary Chinese audiences by adapting the character's story to their emotional concerns and social context. Wei Mengxue similarly argues that the film resonates strongly with young audiences because it explores questions of identity, self-development, and personal choice. Rather than accepting predetermined roles, the characters struggle to define themselves and make independent decisions.

From a semiotic perspective, Wang Yingli, Nadzri Hj Mohd Sharif, and Liza Marziana Mohammad Noh argue that the film continues the inheritance of Chinese cultural symbols from the 1979 film Nezha Conquers the Dragon King. The film retains core elements such as Nezha's mythological image, magical weapons, and spirit of resistance, and reshapes them through contemporary values and modern aesthetics.

In 2022, Liu Yuling argued that Ne Zha demonstrates how Chinese animated films adapt traditional folktales for contemporary audiences. The film preserves recognizable mythological elements while changing character motivation, narrative structure, and themes of self-development. That year, You Changcheng added that the film maintains elements of collectivism, filial piety, and social responsibility.

In their 2025 analysis of the film, Peng and Zhang argue that elements of Chan philosophy contribute to its narrative structure and artistic expression.

=== Domestic audience reception ===
Having overtaken Monkey King: Hero Is Back as the top-grossing Chinese animated film of all time and Zootopia as the highest-grossing animation of all time at the Chinese box office, Ne Zha is popular amongst Chinese audiences, especially the youth. Scholars Thomas Whyke, Joaquin Mugica, and Melissa Brown (2021) argue that the 'nuanced, implying mutual friendship' relationship between the character Nezha and Aobing "anticipates and caters to the prevalence of BL (Boy’s Love) fandom within China - with numerous online discussions and fan art interpreting them as a potential romantic couple." Despite general popularity, the response from domestic audiences varies, with some appreciating its innovative story-telling and some criticizing it as merely a ‘recasting of ‘tired’ modern tropes.’

== Sequels ==
It was confirmed that Ne Zha would be the first instalment in a cinematic universe based on Investiture of the Gods. A second film, Jiang Ziya was slated for release on 25 January 2020 in China, but following the COVID-19 pandemic, all Chinese New Year releases were cancelled. It was released on 1 October 2020, which aligned with China's national day, in both China and the U.S.

A direct sequel to the film, Ne Zha 2, was released on 29 January 2025.

== See also ==
- List of submissions to the 92nd Academy Awards for Best International Feature Film
- List of Chinese submissions for the Academy Award for Best International Feature Film
