= Yan Gong =

Chinese water deity

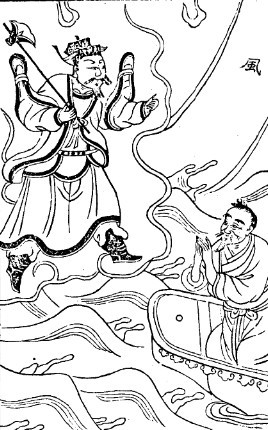
Yan Gong in the Sanjiao Yuanliu Soushen Daquan

Yan Gong (Chinese: 晏公; pinyin: Yàn Gōng), also known as Lord Yan, is a water god in Chinese folk religion. His worship began in Jiangxi and spread to other parts of China during the Ming dynasty, especially along the Yangtze River. Fishermen, sailors, and merchants prayed to him for safe journeys on the water.

== Legends ==
According to the Sanjiao Yuanliu Soushen Daquan, Yan Gong was a man named Yan Shuzai (晏戍仔) from Qingjiang in Jiangxi. He worked as an official during the early Yuan dynasty. He became ill and died on a boat while returning home. Before his body arrived, people in his hometown claimed to have seen him alive. When his coffin was opened, it was empty. The villagers believed he had become a god and built a temple for him. He was later said to protect boats from storms.

In another tradition, Yan Gong was a water demon who caused trouble for boats. The goddess Mazu defeated him and made him one of her attendants. This account appears in the Tianfei Xiansheng Lu (天妃顯聖錄).

== Worship ==
Yan Gong was widely worshipped during the Ming dynasty. Temples dedicated to him were built in Hubei and other areas along the Yangtze River. His worship spread through merchants, migrants, and local officials.

The worship of Yan Gong declined during the Qing dynasty, when Jinlong Sida Wang became more widely worshipped with support from government officials. Yan Gong was still worshipped, but often alongside other gods rather than as the main deity.

Yan Gong is also worshipped in Taiwan, often as an attendant of Mazu. The National Museum of Taiwan History holds a wooden statue of him dating from the Qing dynasty. It shows him wearing armor and sitting with one foot on a boat and the other on a wave.
