= DMAX =

DMAX may refer to:

- D_{max}, Maximum point dose to an organ or tumor target in radiotherapy cancer treatment.
- In densitometry of optics and imaging "D-max" refers to maximum optical density: The greatest achievable opaqueness or optical absorbency. D-min (Minimum density) is the corresponding expression of the lowest achievable density.
- Isuzu D-Max, a pickup truck produced by Isuzu
- DMAX (engines), of Moraine, Ohio, a joint venture between General Motors and Isuzu Motors, a manufacturer of Diesel engines for trucks
- DMAX (TV channel), a German TV channel focused on men, owned by Warner Bros. Discovery International
  - DMAX (British TV channel), a British TV channel owned by Warner Bros. Discovery International
  - DMAX (Italian TV channel), an Italian TV channel owned by Warner Bros. Discovery International
  - DMAX (Spanish TV channel), a Spanish TV channel owned by Warner Bros. Discovery International
  - DMAX (Asian TV channel), an Asian TV channel owned by Warner Bros. Discovery International
  - DMAX (Middle East and North Africa), a pan-Arabic TV channel owned by Warner Bros. Discovery International
  - DMAX (Turkey), a Turkey TV channel owned by Warner Bros. Discovery International
- China Film Giant Screen - a premium large film format company, previously known as DMAX
