= The Girl Who Stole Time =

2025 Chinese animated film

- International release poster
- Simplified Chinese: 时间之子
- Traditional Chinese: 時間之子
- Literal meaning: Child of Time
- Hanyu Pinyin: Shíjiān zhīzǐ
- Directed by: Yu Ao; Zhou Tienan
- Screenplay by: Yu Ao; Zhou Tienan
- Produced by: Sun Lingyu
- Starring: Karry Wang; Liu Xiaoyu; Zhou Shen; Huang Bo
- Cinematography: Liu Xizhi; Yuan Yuan; Zeng Jialin
- Music by: Luan Hui
- Production companies: Maoyan Pictures; Bu Xi Animation
- Distributed by: Tianjin Maoyan Weiying Culture Media
- Release date: May 30, 2025 (China)
- Running time: 107 minutes
- Country: China
- Language: Mandarin
- Box office: US$27.9 million (¥189 million)

The Girl Who Stole Time, also known as Endless Journey of Love (Chinese: 时间之子; pinyin: Shíjiān zhīzǐ; lit. 'Child of Time') is a 2025 Chinese animated fantasy adventure film written and directed by Yu Ao and Zhou Tienan. The story follows Qian Xiao, a young girl who accidentally obtains an artifact giving her the ability to control time, making her the new target of a powerful criminal organization determined to take it back.

== Premise ==
Qian Xiao, a cheerful girl from a fishing village, gets a mysterious pendant called the Time Dial, which gives her the power to control time. That power draws danger, including Seventeen, a cold-faced assassin, and when their paths collide, an adventure begins.

== Voice cast ==
Voice actor	Character	Notes
Karry Wang	Seventeen	Cold-faced assassin
Liu Xiaoyu	Qian Xiao	Fishing village girl
Zhou Shen	Amu	Aspiring director
Huang Bo	Guardian of the Time Wheel	
Jia Bing	Boss Wan	Crime boss
Ma Dong	Master Jiu	
Jin Jing	Mama Jin / Elderly woman from the fishing village / Clothing shop owner	
Zhou Tienan	Crime boss	
Yan Peilun	Grandpa Yan / Second-in-command of the Alley / Ice cream shop owner / Mermaid captor	
Zhang Xiaowan	Nine	Assassin
Liu Yang	Ten	Assassin
Luo Shengdeng	Brother Deng of the Metropolis / Champion of Justice	
Xuan Xiaoming	Master Scar	Fishing village arts and culture worker
Cao Xue	Heartthrob	Movie star of the Metropolis
Peng Enyi	Unscrupulous paddle steamer merchant	
Liang Sheng	Saeki	Leader of the assassin organization
He Ziqian	Little boy with ice cream	

== Production ==
Endless Journey of Love claims to be the industry’s first fully cloud-produced animated film, using Maoyan’s cloud production platform; the producers said more than 70% of the production workload, and 100% of rendering and data storage, were completed in the cloud. Cloud workflows reduced setup time for outside vendors and made it possible to do many more visual iterations on scenes such as lighting changes, the whale sequence, and the ship-through-waves shot.

The project took about five years from scriptwriting through dubbing, and was built across more than 2,000 shots.

=== Animation ===
The film was produced by Maoyan Pictures and co-produced by Bu Xi Animation. It was created through a distributed production model involving over 70 collaborating teams and more than 1,000 artists, all connected through the same cloud-based pipeline.

=== Music ===
The original score was composed by Beijing-based composer Luan Hui, while two original songs were written by the pop music composer and producer Qian Lei.

Dreaming of You (梦见你), sung by Zhou Shen (who also voices the character Amu), was the film’s theme song, released on May 26, 2025. I Only Wish (我只愿), sung by Liu Yuning, was released 4 days later.

== Release ==
The film was released theatrically in China on May 30, 2025.

In February 2025, ahead of the Chinese release, Fortissimo Films acquired worldwide sales rights for the film (excluding China), launching sales at the European Film Market. The film was released in several film festivals, including the Annecy International Animation Film Festival, yet never received a standard release outside of China.

The film's lack of a major overseas release coincided with the international success of Ne Zha 2, another animated family film, which became the highest-grossing film of 2025 and the fifth-highest-grossing film of all time.

== Reception ==
=== Box office ===
The film grossed a total of US$27.9 million (¥189 million) in 62 days.

=== Accolades ===
At the 2025 Fantasia International Film Festival, the film won a Satoshi Kon Award for Excellence in Animation for Best Animated Feature. In September 2025, it was nominated for the Best Animated Film award by the jury at the 38th China Film Golden Rooster Awards. In October, it won the Silver Award for Best Animated Feature Film (Domestic) at the 17th Xiamen International Animation Festival's "Golden Dolphin Award".

It was also part of the Annecy International Animation Film Festival 2025 lineup.
