= Jiaozi (director) =

Chinese animation director

- 饺子
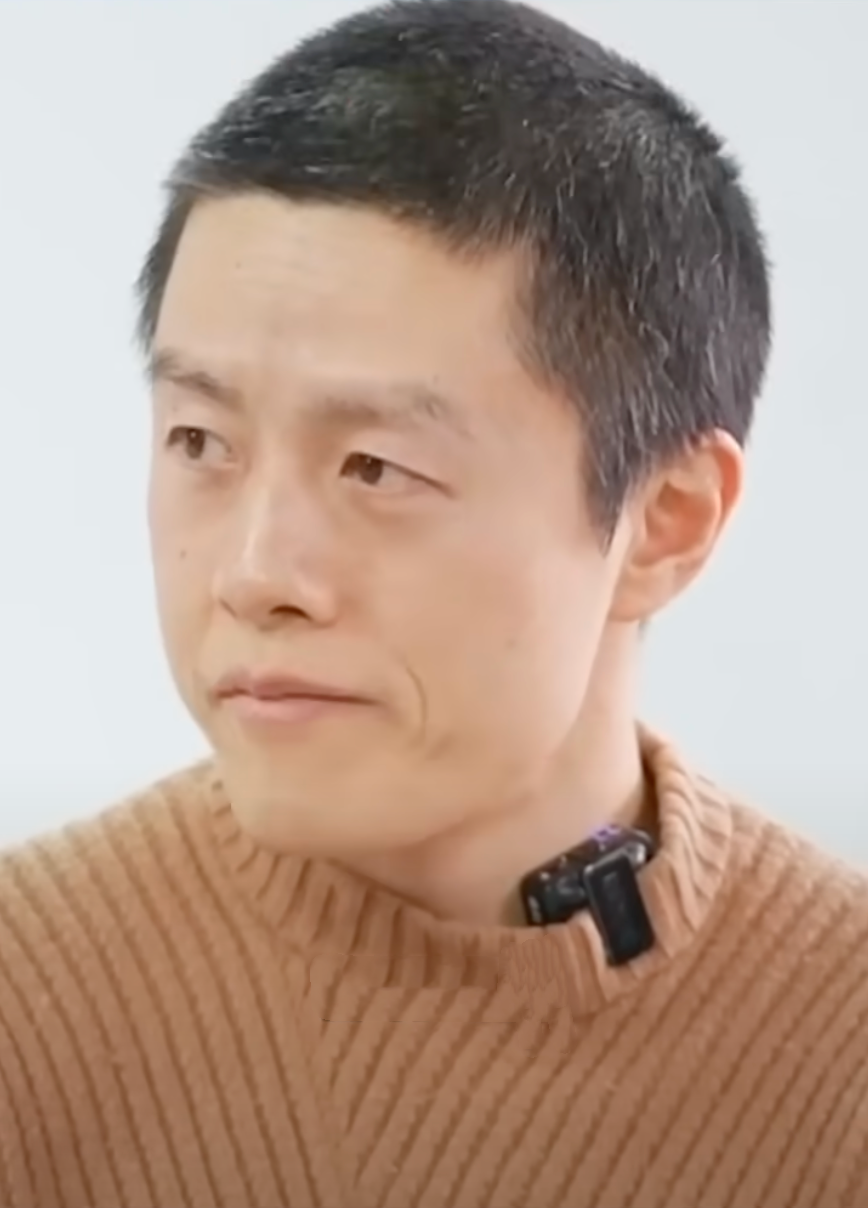
- Jiaozi in 2025
- Born: Yang Yu (杨宇); 1980 (age 45–46); Luzhou, Sichuan, China
- Education: Sichuan University (BS)
- Occupation: Animation director
- Notable work: Ne Zha; Ne Zha 2

Yang Yu (Chinese: 杨宇; born 1980), known professionally as Jiaozi (饺子), is a Chinese animation director, screenwriter, and producer. He graduated from Sichuan University with a bachelor's degree in pharmacy. His work as director and screenwriter includes the animated feature films Ne Zha and Ne Zha 2. His film Ne Zha 2 has made him the first non-Hollywood director to produce a movie earning US$1 billion and US$2 billion, and the first animation director to earn US$2 billion.

== Biography ==
Jiaozi was born in 1980 in the city of Luzhou, Sichuan, China. Both of his parents were medical doctors. He graduated from Sichuan University with a bachelor's degree in pharmacy. After graduation, with enthusiasm for animation and production work, he joined a local advertising company, but he quit the job after a year. Later, he was unemployed for six years. After his father died, he lived with his mother on her CN¥1,000 (US$120) monthly retirement pension for three years.

Jiaozi's December 2008 debut short film, See Through (打，打个大西瓜), won multiple domestic and international awards, including the Special Jury Prize in the International Competition section of the 26th Berlin International Short Film Festival and the Gold Award at the 12th Japan TBS DigiCon6 Grand Final. However, he still remained unknown until the release of his first feature film in 2019.

In July 2019, Jiaozi released his first animated feature film, Ne Zha (哪吒之魔童降世), serving as both its director and screenwriter. The global box office totaled US$726 million. The film became the highest-grossing film in mainland China in 2019 and is the fifth highest-grossing film in Chinese cinema history as of 2025.

In January 2025, Jiaozi released the animated feature film sequel, Ne Zha 2 (哪吒之魔童闹海), serving once again as both director and screenwriter. The film achieved both critical and commercial success, becoming the highest-grossing film in Chinese history on 6 February 2025, the highest-grossing animated film worldwide on 18 February 2025, and the fifth highest-grossing film of all time worldwide on 15 March 2025. On 15 February 2025, with just two distributed films, Jiaozi became China's highest-grossing film director of all time, with a Chinese box office revenue of CN¥20.48 billion and a worldwide box office of US$2.96 billion.

== Filmography ==
Year	English Name	Chinese name	Type
2008	See Through	打，打个大西瓜	Short film
2013	The Boss's Woman	老板的女人	Short film
2019	Ne Zha	哪吒之魔童降世	Feature film
2025	Ne Zha 2	哪吒之魔童闹海	Feature film
