= Jinlong Sida Wang =

Chinese water deity

Jinlong Sida Wang (simplified Chinese: 金龙四大王; traditional Chinese: 金龍四大王; pinyin: Jīnlóng Sì Dàwáng), also known as Jinlong Dawang (金龍大王), is a water god in Chinese folk religion. He was worshipped along the Yellow River and the Grand Canal, where boatmen and merchants prayed to him for safe journeys.

== Legend ==
Jinlong Sida Wang is believed to have been Xie Xu (謝緒), a man from Qiantang, Zhejiang, who lived near the end of the Southern Song dynasty. According to old accounts, he lived on Jinlong Mountain and drowned himself after the fall of the Song dynasty. He was the fourth son in his family, which gave him the title Jinlong Sida Wang. Some legends say that he appeared as a small golden snake.

== Worship ==
Temples dedicated to Jinlong Sida Wang began to appear along the Yellow River and the Grand Canal during the Ming dynasty. From the 16th century, officials also prayed to him for protection against floods and problems with river transport, and his cult gradually overtook that of Yan Gong.

In 1646, the Qing dynasty government gave him the title Xianyou Tongji Jinlong Sida Wang (顯佑通濟金龍四大王) and recognized him as a god of the Yellow River.

The National Museum of History in Taiwan holds woodblock prints of Jinlong Sida Wang from the late Qing period. They show him dressed as a military officer with four attendants. One attendant carries a banner bearing the words Huanghe Fuzhu (黃河福主; "Blessed Lord of the Yellow River").
