= Muzha (mythology) =

Character in Chinese mythology

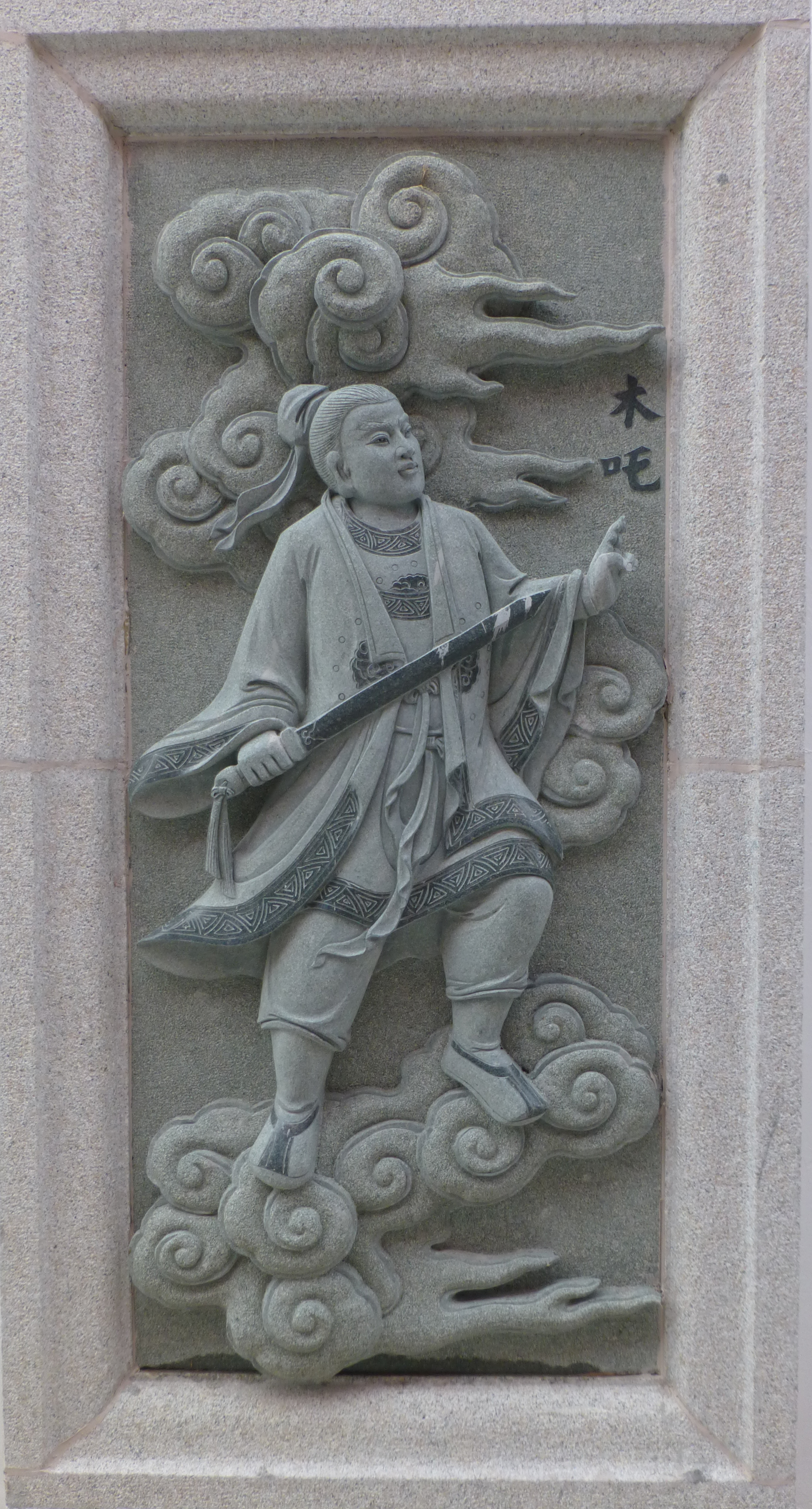

Chinese name
- Traditional Chinese: 木吒
- Simplified Chinese: 木吒
Transcriptions
Standard Mandarin
- Hanyu Pinyin: Mùzhā
- Bopomofo: ㄇㄨˋㄓㄚ
- Wade–Giles: Mu^{4}-cha^{1}
Southern Min
- Hokkien POJ: Bo̍k-chhia
- Tâi-lô: Bo̍k-tshia

木叉
Transcriptions
Standard Mandarin
- Hanyu Pinyin: Mùchā
- Wade–Giles: Mu^{4}-ch'a^{1}
Southern Min
- Hokkien POJ: Bo̍k-chhe
- Tâi-lô: Bo̍k-tshe

Japanese name
- Kanji: 木吒
- Hiragana: もくたく
- Katakana: モクタク
Transcriptions
- Romanization: Moku Taku

Muzha (Chinese: 木吒; pinyin: Mùzha) is a folk character in Chinese mythology. Muzha appears in many classical literary works including Fengshen Yanyi, The Collection of Gods in Three Religions and Journey to the West. According to folklore, Muzha was born a human during the end of the Shang dynasty to General Li Jing. He is a disciple of the Bodhisattvas Samantabhadra and Guanyin. He had two brothers, Nezha and Jinzha. Muzha is worshipped as a deity in Chinese folk religion, known as Muzha Tianzun. His birthday is the eighth day of the fourth month in the lunar calendar.

== Historicity ==
Mucha (Chinese: 木叉; pinyin: Mùchā; Wade–Giles: Mu^{⁴}-ch'a^{¹}), short for Pratimokṣa in Chinese (Chinese: 波羅提木叉; pinyin: Bólúotímùchā; Wade–Giles: Po^{¹}-lo^{²}-t'i^{²}-mu^{⁴}-ch'a^{¹}), was a historical figure in Han Buddhism during the era of Tang Empire. He was an apprentice of Master Sangha, along with Hui-an (Note: Chinese: 慧岸; pinyin: Hùiàn; Wade–Giles: Hui^{⁴}-an^{⁴}) and Hui-yen (Note: Chinese: 慧儼; pinyin: Hùiyián; Wade–Giles: Hui^{⁴}-yien^{³}).

As Master Sangha was seen as an avatar of Avalokiteśvara (Kuan Yin), Muzha was later fictionalized as Kuan Yin's apprentice in the Zajü Journey to the West during the Great Yuan period. Afterwards, he was further blend with Hui-an as "Mucha Hui-an" (Chinese: 木叉惠岸; pinyin: Mùchā Hùiàn; Wade–Giles: Mu^{⁴}-ch'a^{¹} Hui^{⁴}-an^{⁴}) in the Chinese classic novel Journey to the West during the Great Ming period.

== Legends ==
Muzha's story is recorded in volume 7 of The Collection of Gods in Three Religions (三教搜神大全). According to Muzha Subdues the Demons and the Great Sage of Sizhou Captures Shuimu (木叉行者降妖泗州大聖鎖水母) from Recording Ghost Book (錄鬼簿), Muzha assists his master Guanyin to transform into Sangha (the Great Sage of Sizhou) and subdue the water monster.

=== Fengshen Yanyi ===
In the classic Chinese novel Fengshen Yanyi, he was born as Li Muzha is the second son of Li Jing and Lady Yin. In appearance, Muzha is seen wearing a small top knot, a silk sash, linen shoes, and a cotton like garment. Thus, Muzha was seen as a celestial being — such as that of a superiorman — in appearance.

For many years, Muzha had left his father, Li Jing, to study under the Superiorman Universal Converter of White Egret Cave. Following the rebirth of Nezha, and the near death of Li Jing, Li Jing would run into Muzha — as to save his life. Muzha would react with great anger towards Nezha and would soon battle it out with his renowned long sword against the fire-tipped spear. Soon enough during their fierce duel, Li Jing would try to make another escape; this was the point in which Muzha would be defeated by Nezha's golden brick — which thrust him to the ground due to its great weight. Following this point, Muzha would later present himself before Li Resounding, one of four superiormen of Nine Dragon Island. Muzha chose to immediately kill Li Resounding at the first sign of defiance towards his words. Muzha would remain as a celestial protector of the Western Foothills, with Nezha and Jinzha following this point.

=== Journey to the West ===
In Journey to the West, Muzha became a disciple of Guanyin in the heavenly court, with the legal name Hui An. When he was ordered to conquer the sand demon, and later Sun Wukong lost to the Red Boy, Hui An borrowed 36 Tian Gang swords from his father Li Jing to help the Guanyin Bodhisattva conquer the Red Boy, making him a good boy under the Guanyin.

== Worship ==
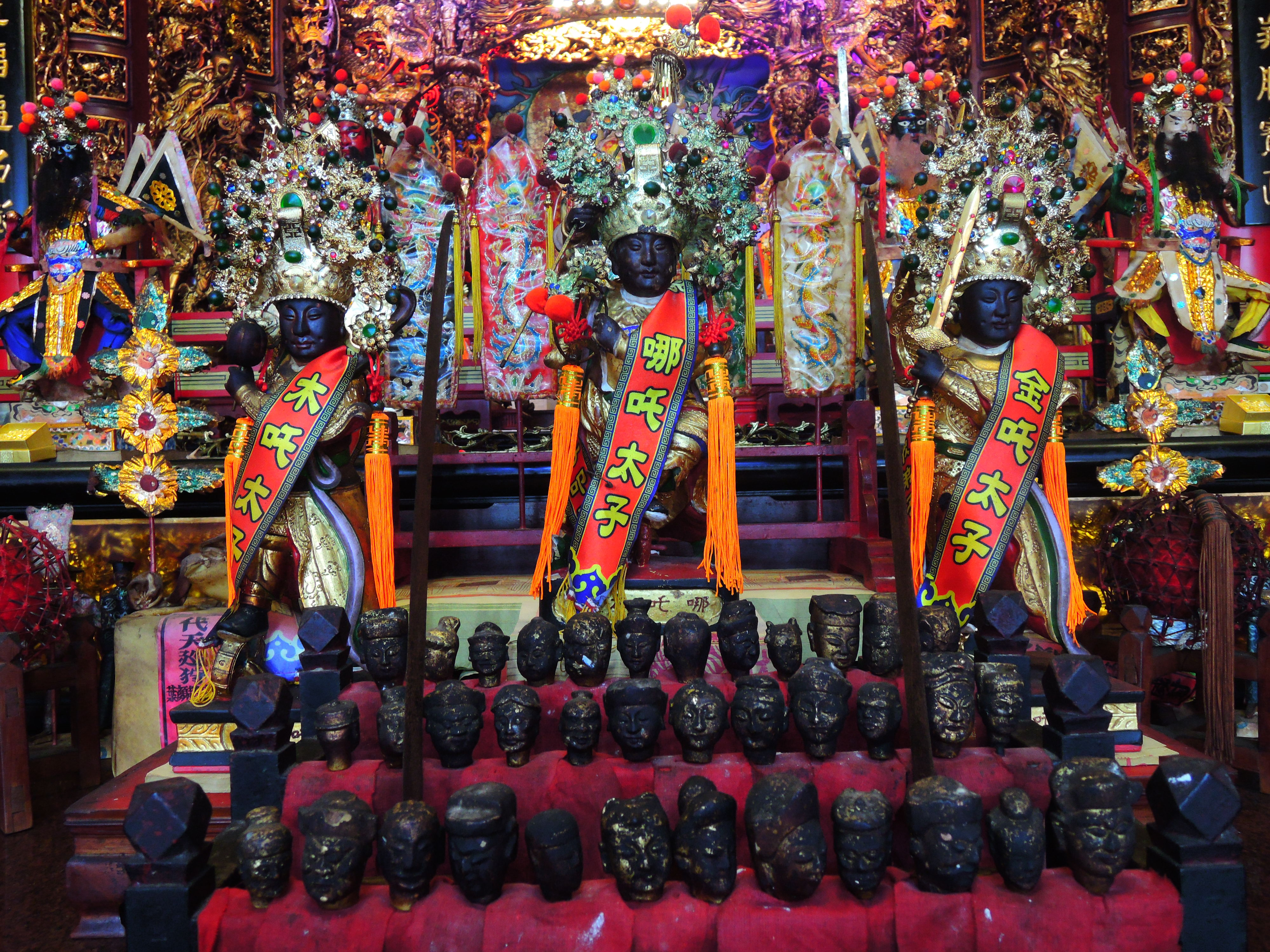
Statues of Nezha, Jinzha and Muzha

Muzha is worshipped as a deity in Chinese folk religion, where he is also known as Muzha Tianzun. His statue often appears in temples dedicated to his father Li Jing and Nezha. He is enshrined as a main deity in Hongfa Palace Temple in Zhubei City, Hsinchu County. His oversea temple "Muzha Palace" was built in Klang, Malaysia in 1988, and is an important landmark in Klang.
