= Jinzha =

Chinese mythological figure

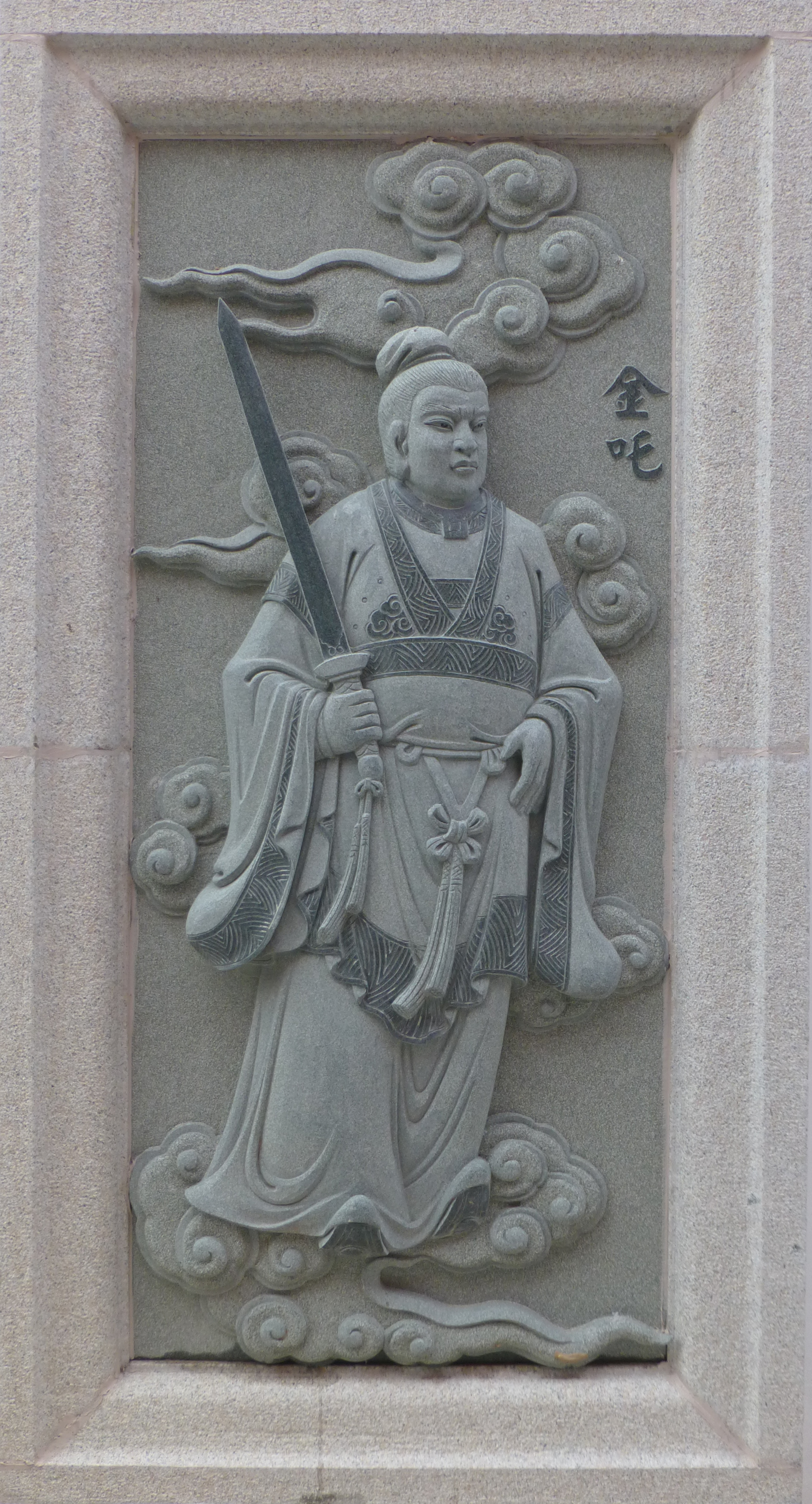
Jinzha

Jinzha (Chinese: 金吒; pinyin: Jīnzhā) is a figure in Chinese mythology, appearing in works such as Investiture of the Gods. A disciple of the superiorman Wenshu Guangfa Tianzun, he is the eldest brother of Nezha and Muzha.

== Belief ==
According to the Dao Fa Hui Yuan, it is stated that Jinzha and Nezha are of the same type of Taoist protective deities and are among the subordinates of Wang Ye.

Originally, Jinzha was one of the Five Great Wisdom Kings in Tibetan Buddhism, also known as Kuṇḍali or sometimes as the Ganlu Mingwang (甘露明王), who was responsible for longevity, healing, purification, and exorcism. However, due to potential influences from folk literature, the name "軍吒" (Junzha or Junzhalili) was changed to "金吒" (Jinzha) to align with the character "木吒" (Muzha).

In folk temple festivals, Jinzha is often referred to as the "Great Crown Prince of Tuotuo Tianwang" and is worshipped in temples along the southern coastal regions alongside his younger brothers, the Second Prince Muzha and the Third Prince Nezha.

In the folklore of southern Fujian, Tong'an, and Kinmen, Jinzha is often portrayed in white attire. In temples and shrines across the Fujian-Taiwan region, Jinzha is commonly depicted riding either a snow lion or a dragon horse. During traditional folk exorcism ceremonies, Jinzha is symbolized as a young man wearing a crown, while Muzha and Nezha have distinctive hairstyles – Muzha with a topknot and Nezha with three buns – distinguishing their respective ages. Jinzha is closely associated with military protection rituals and is revered as a god of war. In ancient legends, Jinzha wields various magical weapons, including the Ruyi Dragon Stake, swords, spears, lances, the Ganlu Treasure Vase, and a spiritual snake, among others.

== Character biography ==
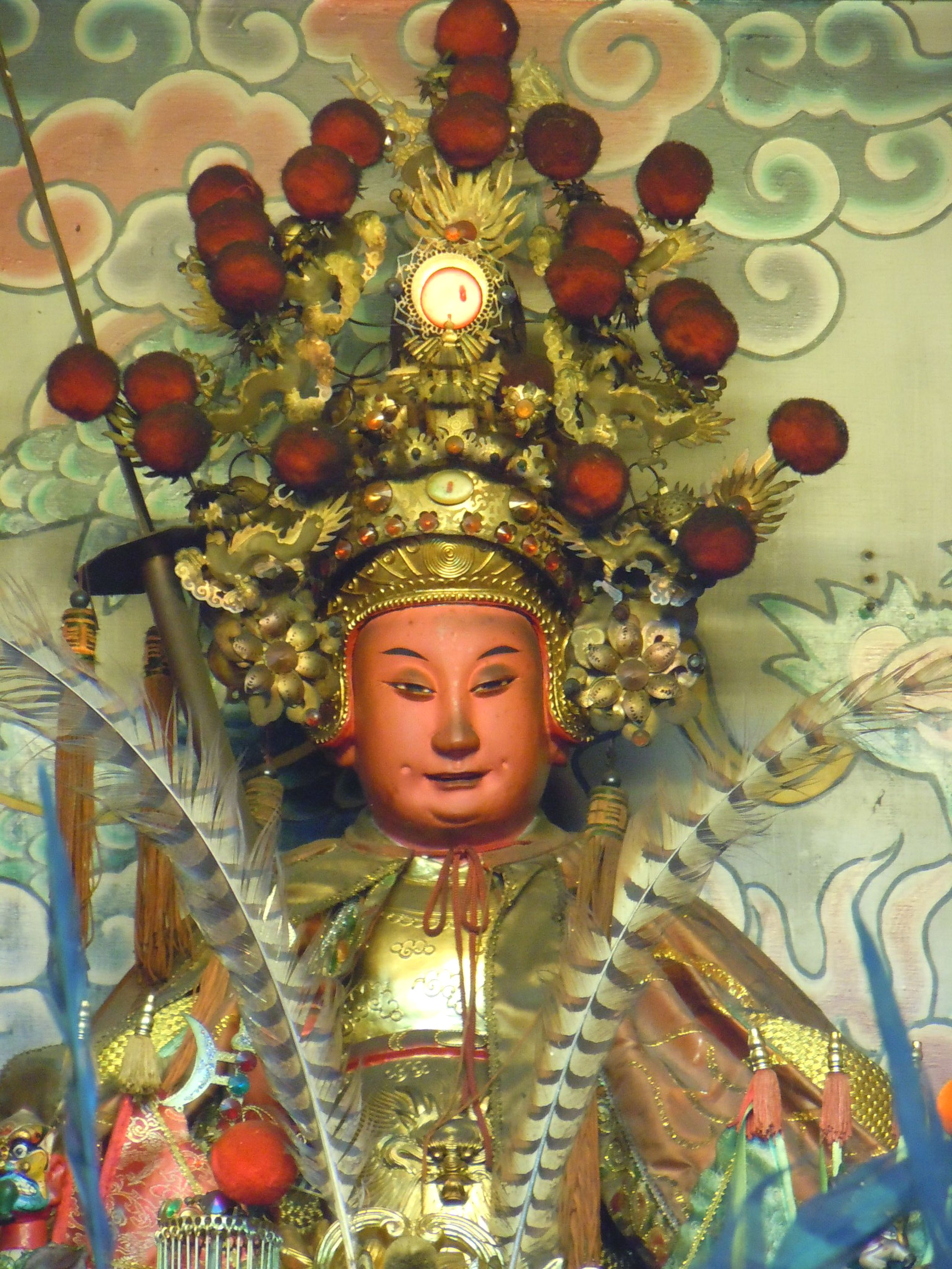
Statue of Jinzha, the Great Crown Prince Marshal in the Gangwei Prince Temple, Taichung City

Jinzha was born to General Li Jing and Lady Yin. The eldest brother of Nezha and Muzha, Jinzha had been a disciple of Wenshu Guangfa Tianzun and Yuanshi Tianzun. He descended from the mountain to assist King Wu in overthrowing Di Xin. His character is characterized as calm and rational, and he displayed military tactics and strategic planning, likely inheriting the wisdom of his master, Wenshu Guangfa Tianzun.

In the book, Jin Zha is described wearing a pale yellow Taoist robe. His magical weapon, the "Dunlong Zhuang" (遁龙桩), also known as the "Qibao Jinlian" (七宝金莲), originates from the image of Ganlu Mingwang holding a spiritual snake. The Dunlong Zhuang was crafted by Wenshu Guangfa Tianzun and appears as a three to four-inch wooden stick with three iron rings when not in use. However, when deployed, it extends to over three zhang (approximately 9 meters) in height. The three iron rings transform into iron hoops that can be fastened around individuals, one around the neck, one around the waist, and the remaining one around the ankles, becoming tighter with movement. It has been used on Nezha, Wang Mo (the Four Saints Grand Marshal), and Qin Wan (Qin Tianjun) before being passed on to Jinzha.

In the novel Journey to the West, Jinzha served on Mount Ling as the chief guardian under the command of Tathagata Buddha.

In the Qing dynasty Ché Wáng Fǔ (车王府) opera script Investiture of the Gods (封神榜), Jin Zha is described as having white teeth, red lips, and a handsome face.

== Bibliography ==
- Chew, Katherine (2002). Tales of the Teahouse Retold: Investiture of the Gods. iUniverse. ISBN 9781462098354.
