= Taiyi Zhenren =

Daoist deity

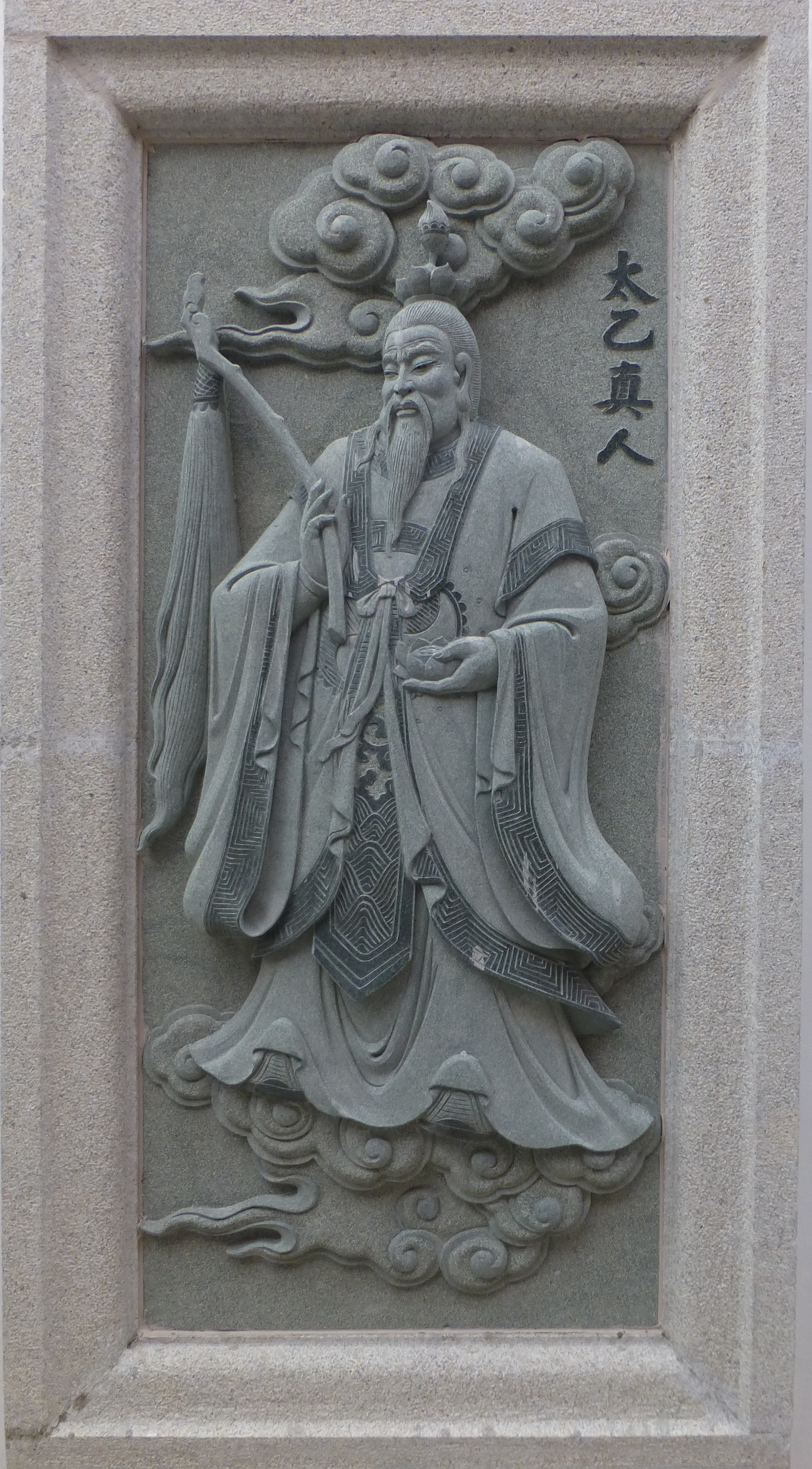
Taiyi Zhenren

Taiyi Zhenren (Chinese: 太乙真人; pinyin: Tàiyǐ Zhēnrén) is a Daoist deity in Chinese religion and Taoism. Taiyi (lit. 'great 2nd Celestial stem') means "primordial unity of yin and yang" and Zhenren (lit. 'true person') is a Daoist term for "Perfected Person". According to the opening of the classical novel Fengshen Bang, he is the reincarnation of the first emperor of the Shang dynasty, Tang of Shang.

Taiyi Zhenren also appears in Qing dynasty novels such as The Story of the Fox (狐狸缘全传), The Story of Ji Gong (济公全传), and the storytelling The Immortals Break Through the Heavenly Gate (群仙破天门). He is one of the Twelve Golden Immortals under Yuanshi Tianzun. Ranked fifth among the Twelve Golden Immortals, the character is based on Taiyi Jiuku Tianzun, the Lord of Suffering, who practices in the Golden Light Cave of Qianyuan Mountain. Taiyi Zhenren is the leader of the Qingwei Sect, and master of Nezha and Jinxia Tong'er.

== Taiyi Jiuku Tianzun ==
Taiyi Zhenren is what the Investiture of the Gods calls him, and he is based on the deity Taiyi Jiuku Tianzun (太乙救苦天尊). In orthodox Taoism, he is the deity of salvation for all sentient beings and has myriad manifestations he can take form in the 10 directions, with a different incarnation for each direction, and can transform into other incarnations for any purpose. He is invoked at funerals and other rituals to send the dead to the Eastern Heavenly Pure land Chang Le, where he resides, and also during the Ghost Festival to save suffering souls from Diyu (hell).

It is generally believed that the Taiyi Jiuku Tianzun is an incarnation of Yuanshi Tianzun. Yuanshi Tianzun used his own Nine-Yang essence to transform into Taiyi Tianzun to save all living beings. Another interpretation suggests that this deity is the same as the King Father of the East (東王公), born from the essence of the sun.

== As a historical figure ==
Taiyi Zhenren, believed to be a historical figure named Yang Su, was born in Shuitou, Nan'an County. He was a renowned physician and Taoist during the late Tang dynasty, well-versed in the techniques of Qihuang (岐黄), a form of traditional Chinese medicine. He famously used "silk pulse diagnosis" to cure Ren Neiming, the wife of the contemporary ruler Wang Shenzhi. In recognition of this, Wang Shenzhi honored him with the title "Taiyi Zhenren".

The benevolent actions of Taiyi Zhenren, providing medical help in Fujian, continue to benefit the people of Nan'an. Therefore, he is also known as the "True Physician Immortal". During the Song dynasty, the Neo-Confucian scholar Zhu Xi is said to have composed a couplet in his honor while lecturing in Nan'an. The couplet, inscribed on the Yang Clan Ancestral Hall in Guanqiao and the Zhenren Temple in Putou, praised Yang Su's virtue, talent, and outstanding medical skills, as well as his contributions to flood control and dam construction for the welfare of the people.

== In Fengshen Yanyi ==
According to Fengshen Yanyi, Taiyi Zhenren is the renowned teacher of Nezha, the celestial being destined to bring peace back to the Zhou dynasty. Taiyi Zhenren is stationed atop Mount Champion and instructed Nezha to stay at Old Pond Pass – the place he had been born. After Nezha experienced great trouble with Ao Guang and went fleeing back to him, Taiyi Zhenren would at first be seen in deep thought; Zhenren would soon draw an "invisible juju" along his back however—as to give him a safe passage to heaven through invisibility.

After Nezha created further issues with stone spirit Shiji Niangniang, Taiyi Zhenren would soon be seen face to face with her in front of Taiyi Zhenren's cave which Nezha retreated into for protection. After having no choice but to be rid of Shiji Niangniang, he would start off by disabling the silk scarf which she stole from Nezha, and then trap her within his Nine-dragon-fire-net. While trapped in this net, Taiyi Zhenren summoned several dragons which unleashed a large volley of fire into the net; instantly killing Shiji and turning her back into her original form as a molten rock.

== In Journey to the West ==
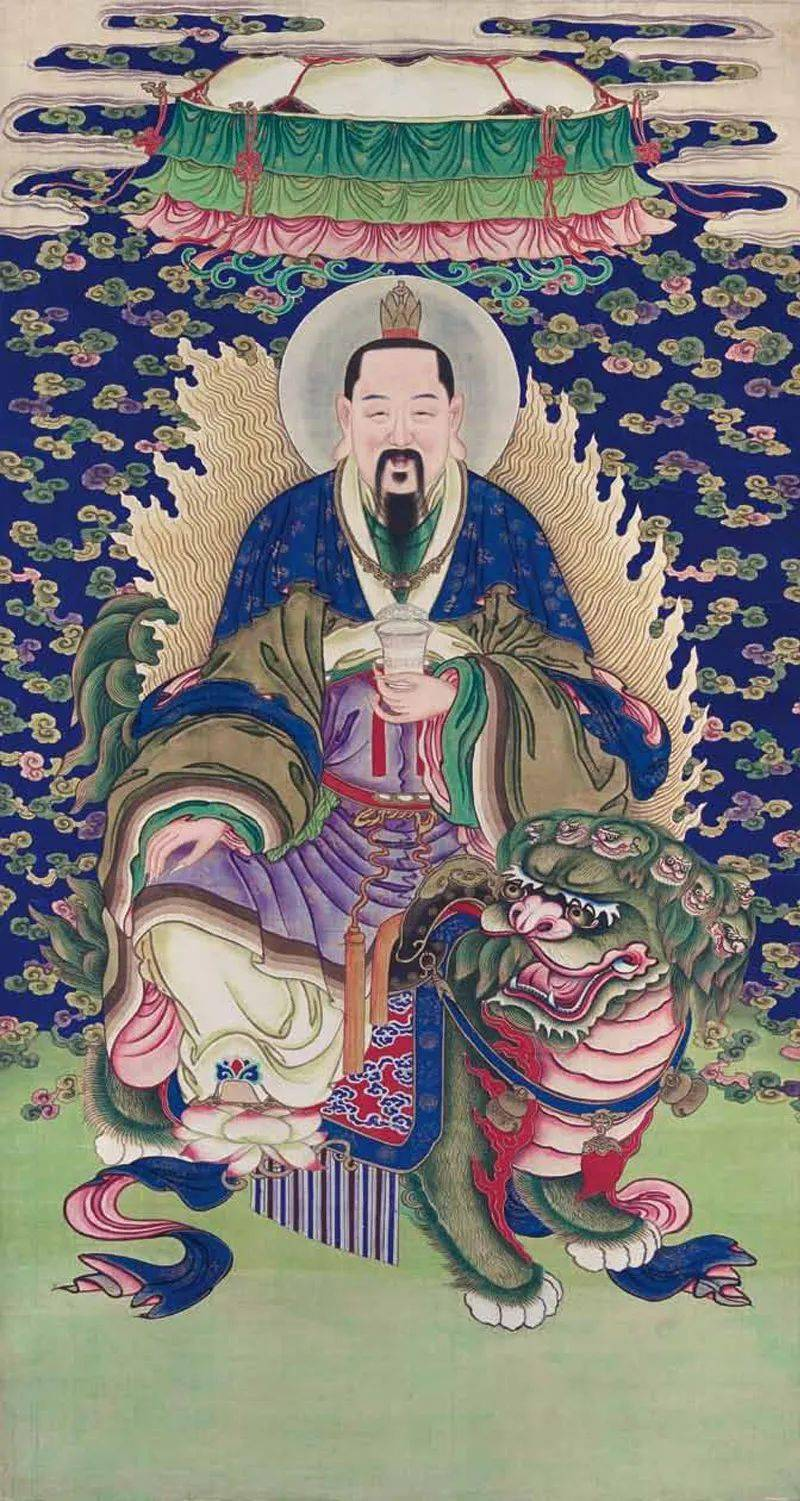
Taiyi Jiuku Tianzun rides on the Nine-Headed Lion

In the Ming dynasty novel Journey to the West, the powerful demon known as the Grand Saint of Nine Spirits (九靈元聖) is actually the Nine-Headed Lion that Taiyi Jiuku Tianzun rides on. The boy in charge of looking after the lion once secretly drank a special potion and fell asleep for three days in Heaven (equivalent to three years in the human world). The lion seizes the opportunity to escape. He builds his base at the Jiuqu Panhuan Cave (九曲盤桓洞) at Bamboo Links Mountain (竹節山) near the Kingdom of Yuhua (玉華國). The clan of lion demons living around that area revere him as their grand spiritual ancestor. The Nine-Headed Lion differs from most other demons in the novel in that he neither harms humans nor seeks to taste Tang Sanzang's flesh. He becomes angered when he learns that his god-grandson, the Tawny Lion Demon, has been killed by Sun Wukong and seeks revenge. He captures Tang Sanzang, Zhu Bajie, Sha Wujing, and the royal family of Yuhua, subjecting them all to whippings. Eventually, he is subdued by his master, Taiyi Jiuku Tianzun, and taken back to Heaven.

== Temple ==
There are many temples dedicated to Taiyi Zhenren as the main deity in China.

Fujian Taiyi Temple is located in Puqi Village, Shuitou Town, Nan'an City, Fujian Province.

The Taiyi Cave Scenic Area is located in Jiangjiadong Village, 5 kilometers south of the hot springs at 106 Chang'an Avenue, Xian'an District, Xianning City, Hubei Province. The cave is believed to have been excavated by Taiyi Zhenren for the welfare of the people and control floods.

Located in the southwestern suburb of Chengdu, Sanqing Hall within Qingyang Palace is a temple dedicated to the supreme Taoist god Sanqing. In the center of the hall sits a statue of Sanqing, and on both sides of the hall are the disciples of Sanqing, including the Twelve Golden Immortals, including Taiyi Zhenren. This historical temple traces its origins back to the Tang dynasty and underwent significant reconstruction during the Kangxi period of the Qing dynasty. The foundation of Sanqing Hall takes the form of a square, covering a total area of 1,600 square meters.

Leshan Zixia Palace, the ancestral temple of the Western Daoist tradition in China, is located at 717 Bishan Road, 130 kilometers southwest of Chengdu City, Sichuan Province. It is 30 kilometers away from Mount Emei. In the Sanqing Hall of Zixia Palace, there are also statues of the Twelve Golden Immortals arranged on both sides.

== In popular culture ==
- Taiyi Zhenren appears as a major supporting character in the animated films Ne Zha (2019) and Ne Zha 2 (2025), voiced by Zhang Jiaming in Chinese, and by Mike Pollock and Rick Zeiff in the English dubs of each film respectively. Both films broke numerous box-office records upon their initial releases, with Ne Zha 2 in particular becoming the highest-grossing film of all time in China, the highest-grossing animated movie of all time, and the fifth highest-grossing movie of all time.

== Sources ==
- Fengshen Yanyi chapter 12
