= China Film Giant Screen =

Chinese film company

China Film Giant Screen (CFGS) is a Chinese premium large film format company. The company was previously known as DMAX, with the name also referring to the film technology. It has been described as a competitor to IMAX Corporation and its IMAX film format. The company is owned by China Film Group Corporation.

== History ==
The CFGS format was apparently developed by the China Research Institute of Film Science & Technology and the China Film Group Corporation. It was created in an attempt to challenge the IMAX film format that dominated the premium large format movie market until that point. The aim was to lower costs and to allow the development of Chinese film projection technology using indigenous Chinese technology and intellectual property.

The format was put into commercial use in 2012.

=== Lawsuit ===
IMAX sued CFGS and related companies for theft of intellectual property; this court action was heard on 18 June 2014. IMAX alleged that Gary Tsui (Chinese name: Cui Xiaoyu, 崔晓宇), a former employee that worked for IMAX from 1999-2009, stole confidential information on proprietary technology and set up competing businesses. Despite a court injunction, it was noted that Gary Tsui had ignored the court orders, and his businesses had evolved into a venture known as DMAX, later to change its name to CFGS. In 2014 IMAX won a court victory in Canada upholding that Tsui had stolen the technology to build up his competing company. IMAX hoped that the Canadian court victory would allow successful legal action in China. IMAX and CFGS's lawsuit finally reached a settlement, and IMAX canceled the lawsuit against the defendant (Gary Tsui).

== See also ==
- IMAX Corporation
- IMAX film format
- China Film Group Corporation
