= Li Jing (deity) =

Figure in Chinese mythology and god in Chinese folk religion

- Chinese: 李靖
Transcriptions
Standard Mandarin
- Hanyu Pinyin: Lǐ Jìng
Yue: Cantonese
- Jyutping: Lei5 Zing6

Pagoda-Bearing Heavenly King Li
- Chinese: 托塔李天王
Transcriptions
Standard Mandarin
- Hanyu Pinyin: Tuō Tǎ Lǐ Tiān Wáng
Yue: Cantonese
- Jyutping: Tok3 Taap3 Lei5 Tin1 Wong4

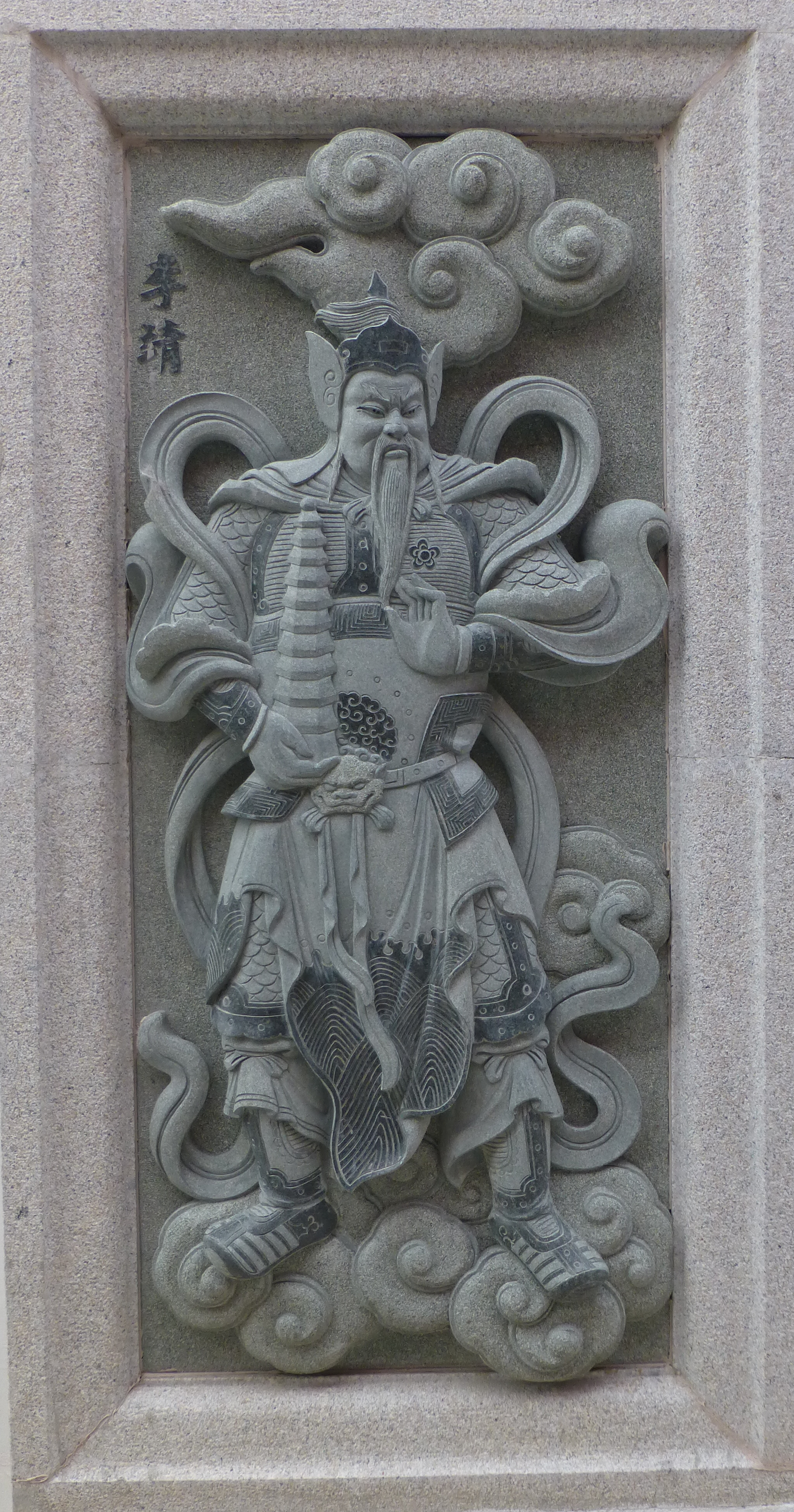
Li Jing

Li Jing, also known as Pagoda-Bearing Heavenly King Li, is a guardian deity in Chinese mythology, who also appears in Japanese and Korean mythology. He is a prominent deity in Chinese Buddhism, Taoism and Chinese folk religion. He is an analogue of the ancient Indian deity Vaisravana or Kubera. Li Jing carries a pagoda that can capture any spirit, demon or god within its walls and appears in the classic Chinese epic novels Journey to the West and Investiture of the Gods (Fengshen Yanyi).

== Origin ==
It is generally believed that Li Jing originates from Vaisravana or Kubera, the Northern Heavenly King and one of the Four Heavenly Kings, the god of wealth who is the prototype of the "Pagoda-Bearing Heavenly King Li". This is because the worship of Vaisravana was prevalent during the Tang dynasty, with the belief that he helped the nation defeat enemy forces. Consequently, temples were built and statues were made everywhere, and he was worshiped during military expeditions.

Furthermore, according to Taoist scriptures, the real person Li Jing, the Duke of Wei during the Tang dynasty, was a general and student of Li Chun and obtained the "Ten Thousand Victory Military Secrets" and the "Mysterious Maiden's Art of War". He held the position of Commander of the Central Mountain, but had no connection with the Pagoda-Bearing Heavenly King. It wasn't until the Ming dynasty novel Journey to the West that the image of Duke Li Jing as the Pagoda-Bearing Heavenly King appeared. Some scholars believe that this image originated from the Li Jing of the Tang dynasty. Additionally, because Li Jing was an outstanding military strategist and had written works on military theory, he was revered as a deity by the Chinese people, and thus became associated with the Pagoda-Bearing Heavenly King.

In Indian mythology, Kubera ruled Lanka but he was betrayed and banished by his sibling Ravana. Later, he became a powerful minister and military general of kingdom Magadha in ancient India under the Solar dynasty. He was later awarded the title of King who then ruled a city named Visana or Alaka in the north, possibly in Tibet, located near the Himalayas. He and his wife had three sons named Manigriva or Varna-kavi (Jinzha), Mayuraja (Muzha), and Nalakubara (Nezha); and a daughter called Minakshi (Li Zhiying).

== In Investiture of the Gods ==
In Investiture of the Gods, Li Jing is a renowned high ranking commander officer of the Old Pond Pass during the Shang dynasty. His wife is Lady Yin, and he has three sons, Jinzha, Muzha, and Nezha also, a youngest daughter named Li Zhiying (in Journey to the West and in Agni Purana as Minakshi). Throughout his past, Li Jing had studied under Du'e Zhenren (度厄真人) of West Mount Kunlun, and had soon become a master of exceedingly fast underground travel (even to the extent of traveling thousands of kilometres without a single individual noticing).

In time, Li Jing would have a third son by the name of Nezha, as destined by the heavens. He and Nezha's relationship began as rocky because Nezha is disobedient and short-tempered. Nezha would cause untold chaos and trouble in the future, such as that with the Eastern Sea Dragon King Ao Guang. Nezha kills the Dragon King's son and gains his wrath. Due to Nezha causing trouble in the Eastern Sea Dragon's Kingdom, Li Jing was required to give his life to Ao Guang if he did not sacrifice Nezha. But Nezha sacrificed himself, handing over his flesh to his parents.

Following the bitter luck attained with his third son, Li Jing burned the sacrificial temple that had been built for Nezha's spirit. However, this made Nezha wish to kill his father. After Nezha was reincarnated, his body remade by his master Taiyi Zhenren, his father saw him and said, "You vermin! When you were my child, you caused untold calamities. Why do you reincarnate and disturb the peace?" Thus, a major conflict between Li Jing and Nezha began to unfold.

Battling Nezha, Li Jing soon realized that his mortal body could not match Nezha's. Fearing for his life, he ran as fast as he could underground, where he ran into his second son, Muzha. Following Muzha's defeat by Nezha's hands, Li Jing tried to commit suicide. Wenshu Guangfa Tianzun interceded, saving Li Jing's life and containing Nezha. Nezha was then forced to submit to his father after being restrained by another deity by the name of Randeng Daoren. To effectively restrain Nezha, Randeng Daoren taught Li Jing how to use the golden tower art to trap Nezha within a burning tower if opposed. Thus, Li Jing became known as Li the Pagoda Bearer.

== Folk festival ==
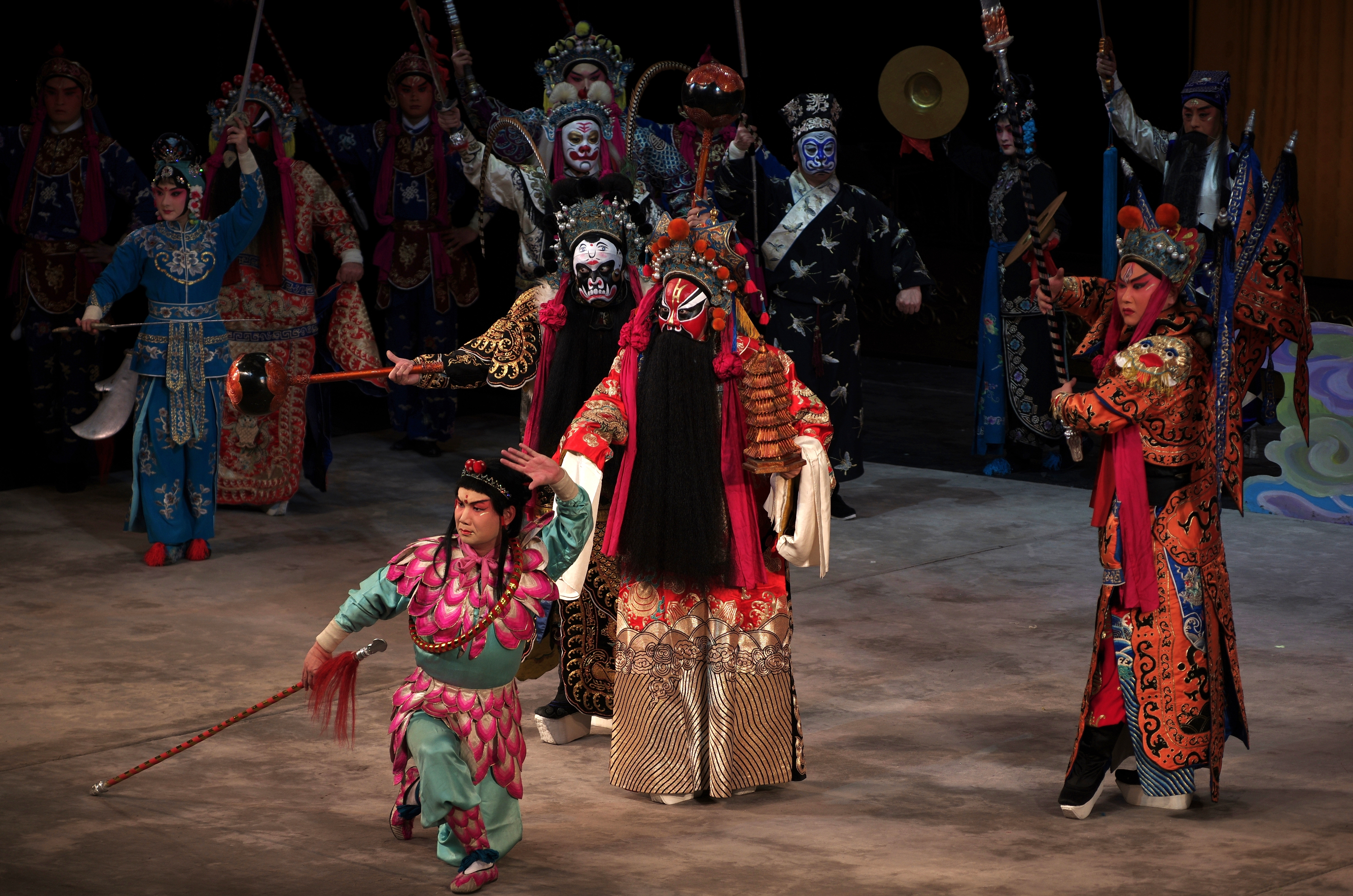
Li Jing in an opera portraying the legend.

After the Tang dynasty general Li Jing was revered as a deity by the people, he became commonly known as the Pagoda-Bearing Heavenly King in folk culture. Simultaneously, a festival named after the Pagoda-Bearing Heavenly King Li Jing, the "Ling Gong Festival" emerged. The Ling Gong Festival originated in the mid-Ming dynasty. Legend has it that in 1528 (according to one account, it was the eleventh year of Yongle, 1413), there was a county magistrate named Zheng Xi from Fujian in Yongfu. His attendant, whose surname was Lin, after settling down in Yongfu, did not return to his hometown. Due to acclimatization and the decline of his family, he returned to his old home in Fujian to invite the deity statue and memorial tablet of Ling Gong, the Pagoda-Bearing Heavenly King Li Jing, back for worship to ward off evil and epidemics. The festival was set on the twenty-first day of the tenth lunar month every year.

The Ling Gong Festival is prevalent in the Lin Village, Gaochong, Chongshan, and other villages in Yongfu County, Guilin City. During the festival, the entire clan gathers in the ancestral hall to hold jìsì (祭祀) rituals. In the rituals, they invite Taoist priests and sorceresses to perform rituals to expel filth and evil spirits. At the same time, activities such as "singing wéndēng (文灯) and performing wǔdēng (武灯)" are carried out to show reverence. Wéndēng can be understood as "civil lantern" or "cultured lantern" and wǔdēng as "martial lantern" or "vigorous lantern," referring to different styles of lantern performances. After the rituals are completed, the whole clan has a dinner together in the ancestral hall. Later, the wéndēng performance in the Ling Gong Festival gradually evolved into the cáidiào (彩调) opera genre, and Lin Village became the birthplace of cáidiào. Cáidiào can be translated as "colorful tune" or "folk opera." The Ling Gong Festival has been included in the list of representative intangible cultural heritage projects in Guilin City.
