= Comprehensive Collection of Deities from the Three Religions =

Biographical work on Chinese deities

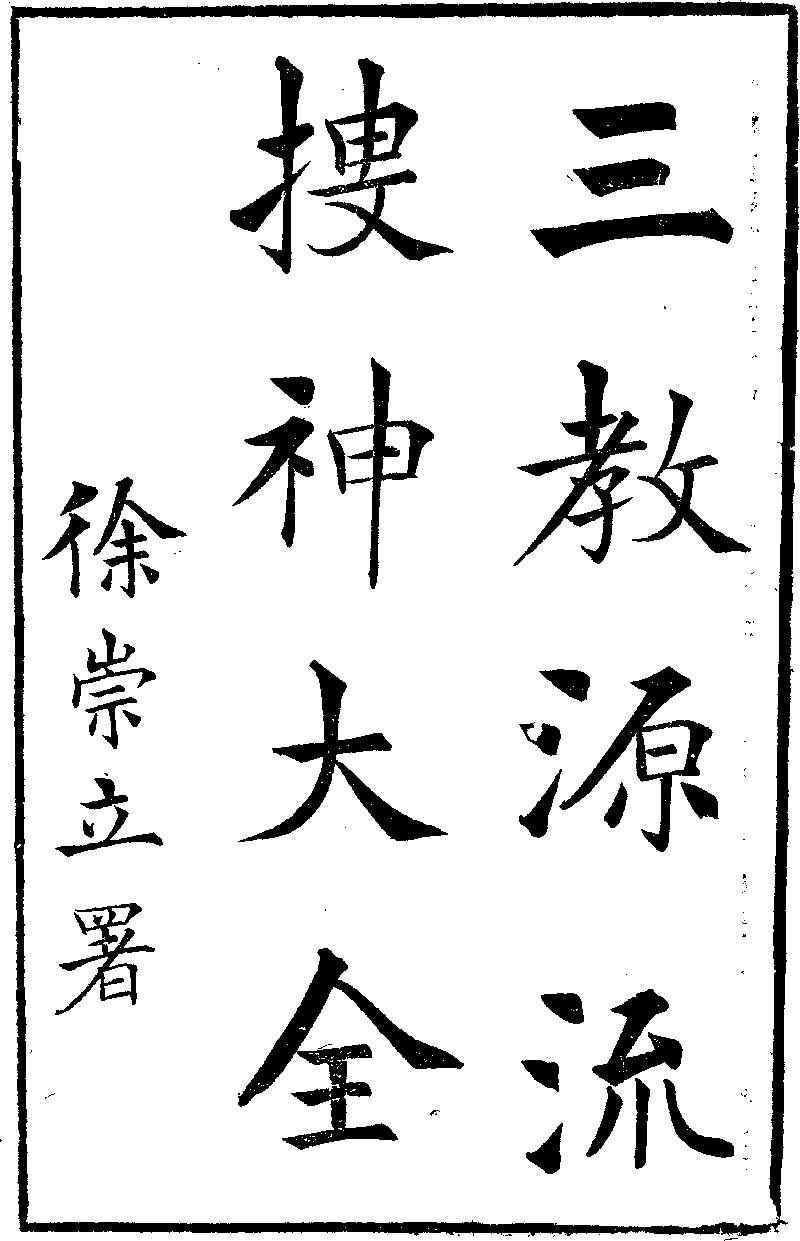
Cover

The Complete Collection of Deities from the Three Teachings (Chinese: 三教源流搜神大全; pinyin: San Jiao Yuan Liu Sou Shen Da Quan) is a biographical work on Chinese deities and immortals, authored anonymously and comprising seven illustrated volumes. Probably completed during the Ming dynasty (1368–1644), it was later reprinted by Ye Dehui during the Qing dynasty (1644–1912) and included in the Lilou Congshu (丽楼丛书) collection. The title reflects its compilation of saints, sages, and deities from Confucianism, Buddhism, and Taoism, making it a valuable reference for studying the Taoist pantheon and folk religious traditions.

The text features over 120 divine portraits, each accompanied by details such as the deity's name, titles, posthumous honors, and accounts of their miracles or deeds. Its content parallels the "Continued Daozang of the Wanli Era: Soushen Ji" (万历续道藏·搜神记 Records of the Search for the Divine), though the latter lacks illustrations but includes more entries, documenting over 160 deities. While Soushen Ji prioritizes breadth, Comprehensive Compilation distinguishes itself with its rich visual depictions and concise annotations, offering unique insights into Ming-era religious syncretism and iconography.
