= Six-tusked White Elephant =

Mythical animal in Chinese Buddhism

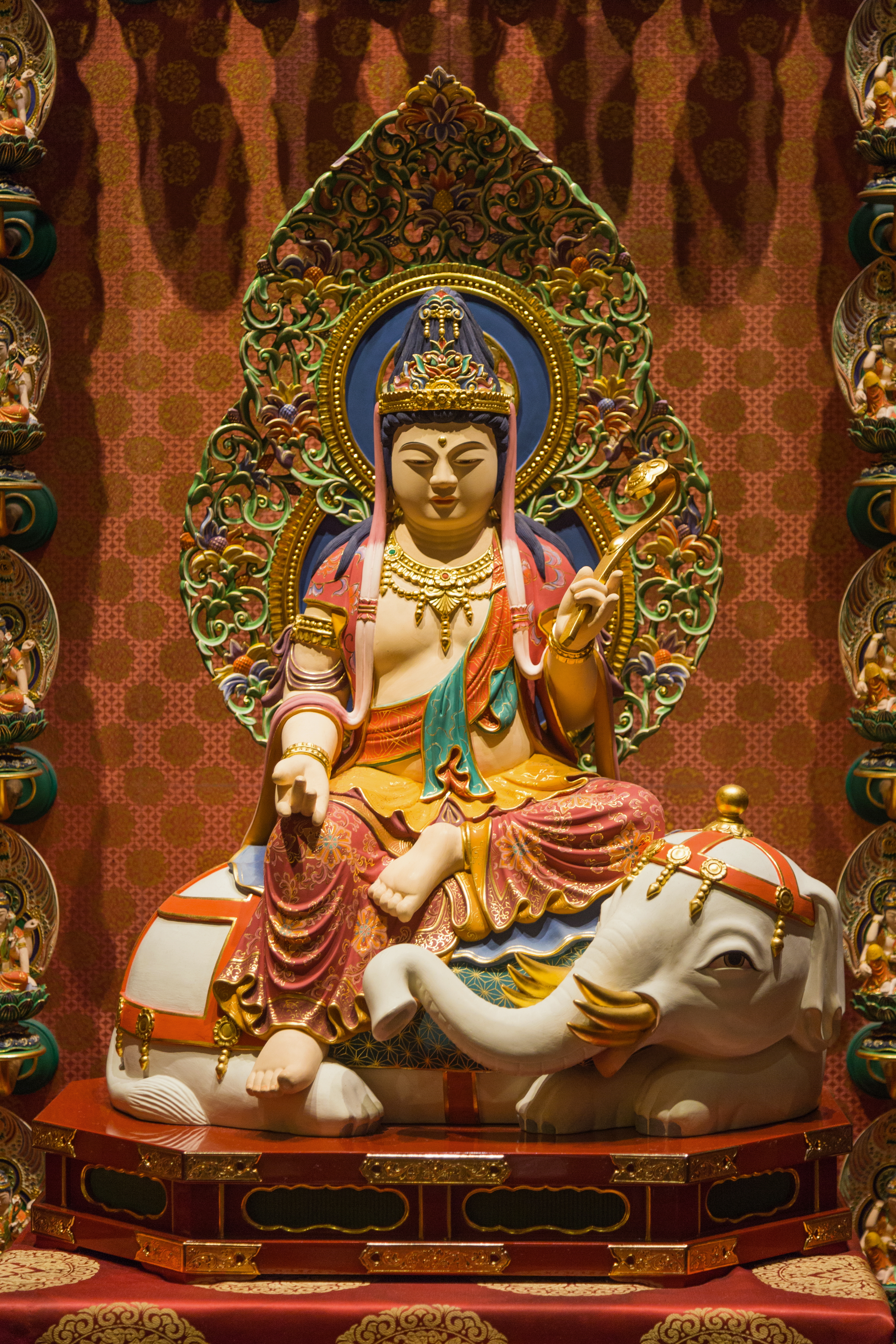
Samantabhadra rides on the six-tusked white elephant.

Six-tusked White Elephant (Chinese: 六牙白象) is the mount of the bodhisattva Samantabhadra (普賢菩薩). It is usually shown as a white elephant with three pairs of tusks, but some artworks show it with one pair. Other depictions show a three-headed elephant or Samantabhadra riding a four-headed white elephant.

== Legend ==
According to texts such as the Karma Sutra (因果经), Śākyamuni Buddha rode a six-tusked white elephant when he descended from the Tuṣita Heaven (兜率天宫) to be born in the human world. Before his birth, his mother, Queen Māyā, dreamed that a six-tusked white elephant entered her womb while she was sleeping at midday. The Abhidharma-mahāvibhāṣā Śāstra (部宗轮论) states that bodhisattvas take the form of a white elephant when entering their mother's womb.

The Samantabhadra Contemplation Sutra (普贤观经) describes the six-tusked white elephant king as the mount of Samantabhadra. It states that Samantabhadra appears riding the elephant to those who sincerely contemplate and repent. The six tusks represent the Six Pāramitās (六度), while its four legs represent the Four Bases of Spiritual Power (四如意). Another interpretation identifies the six tusks with the Six Supernatural Powers (六通).

== Literature ==
In Journey to the West, the White Elephant descends to the mortal world for seven days, which are said to equal thousands of years in the human world, together with Manjusri Bodhisattva's Blue Lion and the Golden-Winged Great Peng. The three become demons and live at Lion-Camel Ridge and Lion-Camel Cave, where they rule over a group of lesser demons. The White Elephant becomes the Yellow-Tusked Old Elephant, the second king. The three demons seek to capture and eat Tang Sanzang in the hope of gaining immortality. They fight Sun Wukong, Zhu Bajie, and Sha Wujing, capturing the latter three while Sun Wukong escapes. Sun Wukong then asks Manjusri Bodhisattva, Samantabhadra Bodhisattva, and Tathagata Buddha (如来佛祖) for help. The three demons are defeated and taken back by the bodhisattvas and Buddha.

In Investiture of the Gods (Fengshen Yanyi), the White Elephant is depicted as Lingya Xian (靈牙仙, "Immortal of Numinous Tusks"), a disciple of the Jie Sect (截教). Due to conflicts between Huoling Shengmu (火靈聖母) and Guang Chengzi, exacerbated by the scheming of Shen Gongbao, tensions escalate between the Jie Sect and the Chan Sect (闡教), ultimately leading to war. During the Battle of the Ten Thousand Immortals Formation (萬仙陣), he commands the Two Forms Formation (兩儀陣) to confront the disciples of the Chan Sect and the Zhou army. However, Puxian Zhenren (普賢真人, the precursor to Samantabhadra Bodhisattva in the narrative) defeats Lingya Xian using the Taiji Talisman Seal (太極符印), forcing him to reveal his true form as a white elephant. Subsequently, the White Elephant becomes the mount of Puxian Zhenren.
