= Samantabhadra (Bodhisattva) =

Bodhisattva

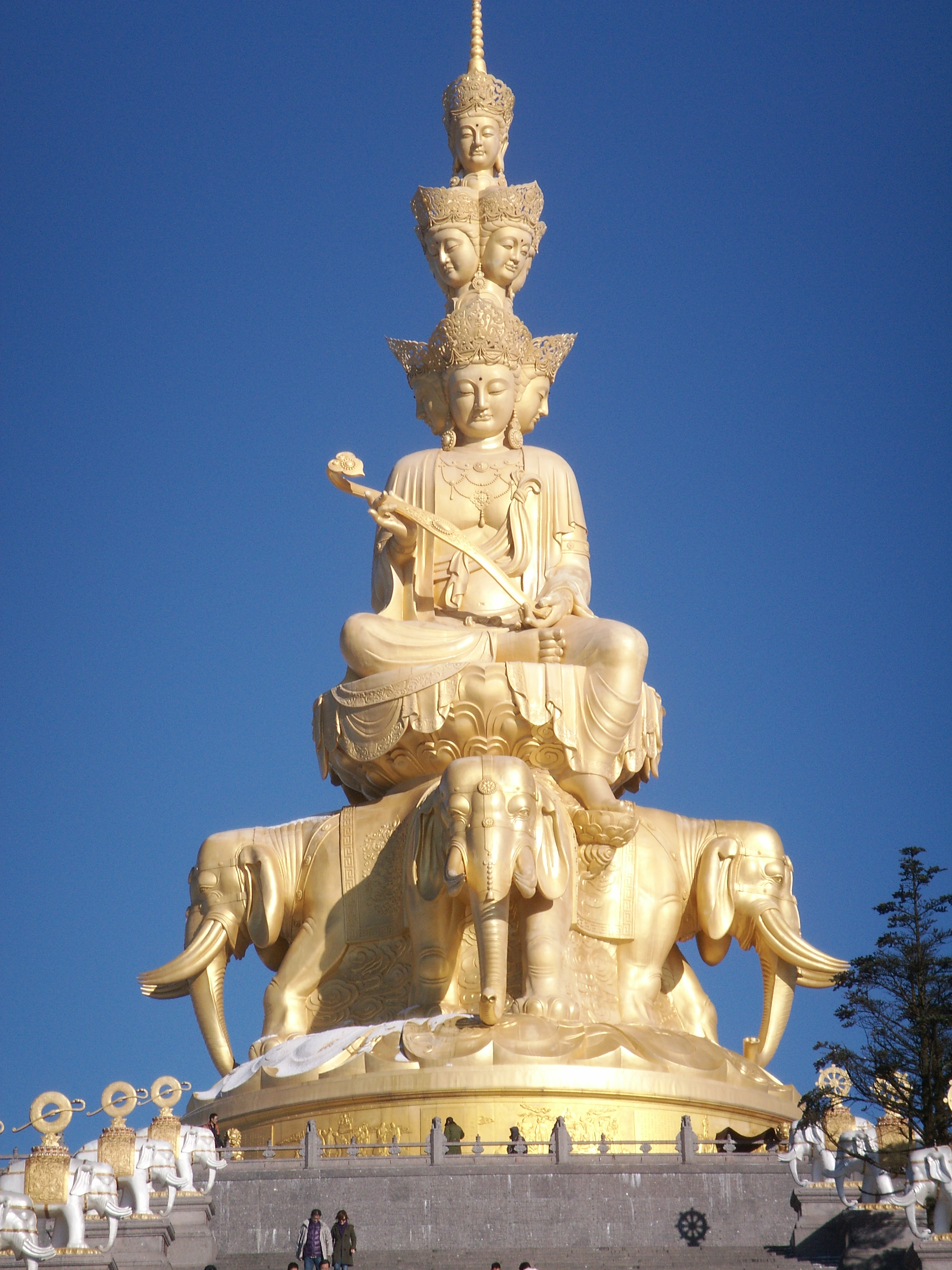
- Statue of Puxian (Samantabhadra) on Mount Emei in Sichuan, China
- Sanskrit: समन्तभद्र; Samantabhadra
- Chinese: 普賢菩薩 普贤菩萨 (Pinyin: Pǔxián Púsà) (Jyutping: pou2 jin4 pou4 saat3) (Southern Min: Phó͘-hiân Phô͘-sat)
- Japanese: 普賢菩薩(ふげんぼさつ) (romaji: Fugen Bosatsu)
- Khmer: សមន្តភទ្រ (sa-mun-ta-phoat)
- Korean: 보현보살 (RR: Bohyeon Bosal)
- Mongolian: Гүндэсамбуу; Самандабадраа; Хотол сайн
- Tagalog: Samantabhadla (Baybayin: ᜐᜋᜈ᜔ᜆᜊᜇ᜔ᜍ)
- Thai: พระสมันตภัทรโพธิสัตว์ Phra Samantaphat Phothisat
- Tibetan: ཀུན་ཏུ་བཟང་པོ་ Wylie: kun tu bzang po THL: küntuzangpo
- Vietnamese: Phổ Hiền Bồ Tát (Chữ Hán: 普賢菩薩)

Information
- Venerated by: Buddhists

Samantabhadra (lit. 'Universal Worthy' or 'All Good') is a great bodhisattva in Buddhism associated with practice and meditation. Together with Shakyamuni Buddha and the bodhisattva Mañjuśrī, he forms the Shakyamuni Triad in Mahayana Buddhism. He is the patron of the Lotus Sutra and, according to the Avatamsaka Sutra, made the ten great vows which are the basis of a bodhisattva.

In Chinese Buddhism, Samantabhadra is known as Puxian and is associated with action, whereas Mañjuśrī is associated with prajñā (transcendent wisdom). As such, his name is often prefixed with the epiphet Daheng (大行; Dàhèng), meaning "He of Great Practice". In the Huayan tradition, he is regarded together with Vairocana Buddha and the bodhisattva Mañjuśrī as one of the "Three Noble Ones of Huayan" (華嚴三聖; Huāyán Sānshèng) due to their preeminence in the Avatamsaka Sutra. In the Chinese Pure Land tradition, the Chapter of the Practices and Vows of Bodhisattva Samantabhadra from the Avatamsaka Sutra where Samantabhadra expounds on his ten vows is often regarded as one of the "Five Pure Land sutras" that are seen as foundational texts. In Japan, Samantabhadra is known as Fugen, and is often venerated in Tendai and Shingon Buddhism. In the Nyingma school of Tibetan Buddhism, Samantabhadra is also the name of the Adi-Buddha, often portrayed in indivisible union (yab-yum) with his consort, Samantabhadrī. In wrathful form he is one of the Eight Herukas of the Nyingma Mahayoga and he is known as Vajramrtra, but this Samantabhadra buddha and Samantabhadra bodhisattva are not the same.

== In Mahayana sutras ==
In the Lotus Sūtra, Samantabhadra is described at length in the epilogue, called the Samantabhadra Meditation Sutra (Chinese: 觀普賢菩薩行法經; pinyin: Guān Pǔxián Púsà Xíngfǎ Jīng), with special detail given to visualization of the bodhisattva, and the virtues of devotion to him.

Samantabhadra is also a key figure in the Āvataṃsaka-sūtra, particularly the last chapter, the Gaṇḍavyūha-sūtra. In the climax of the Gaṇḍavyūha-sūtra, the student Sudhana meets Samantabhadra Bodhisattva who confirms his awakening. Sudhana then merges into Samantabhadra, and Samantabhadra recites a set of popular verses. These verses are known as the Bhadracaripraṇidhāna (Vows of Good Conduct) or Ārya-samantabhadra-caryā-praṇidhāna-rāja (The Royal Vow to follow the Noble Course of Conduct of Samantabhadra). This text which concludes the entire Avatamsaka was very popular in India, East Asia and in Himalayan Buddhism, and it is cited in numerous sources. It was considered to be a dhāraṇī and recited individually as a meritorious text.

=== Ten great vows ===
The core of Samantabhadra's aspirations in the Bhadracaripraṇidhāna are the ten great vows of Samantabhadra. The ten great vows of Samantabhadra are the following:

1. to pay homage to all the buddhas;
2. to glorify the qualities of all the tathāgatas;
3. to make ample offerings to all the buddhas;
4. to confess and repent of all one's misdeeds;
5. to rejoice in the merits of others;
6. to always request the preaching of the dharma;
7. to entreat enlightened beings to remain in the world;
8. to always study the teachings of the buddha;
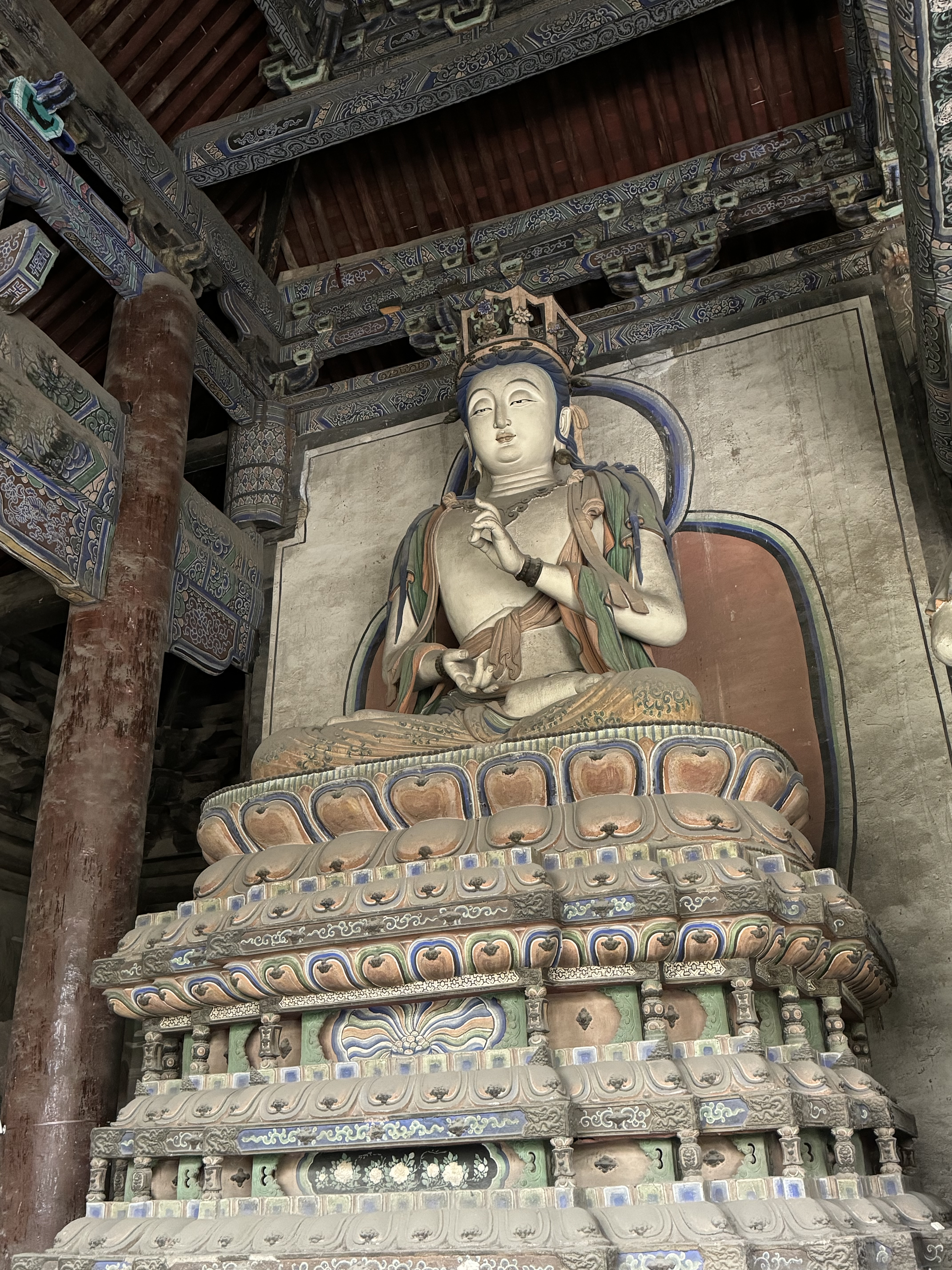
9. Jin dynasty (1115-1234) statue of Puxian as part of a set depicting the Three Noble Ones of Huayan: Piluzhena, Puxian and Wenshu, at Shanhua Temple in Shanxi, China.
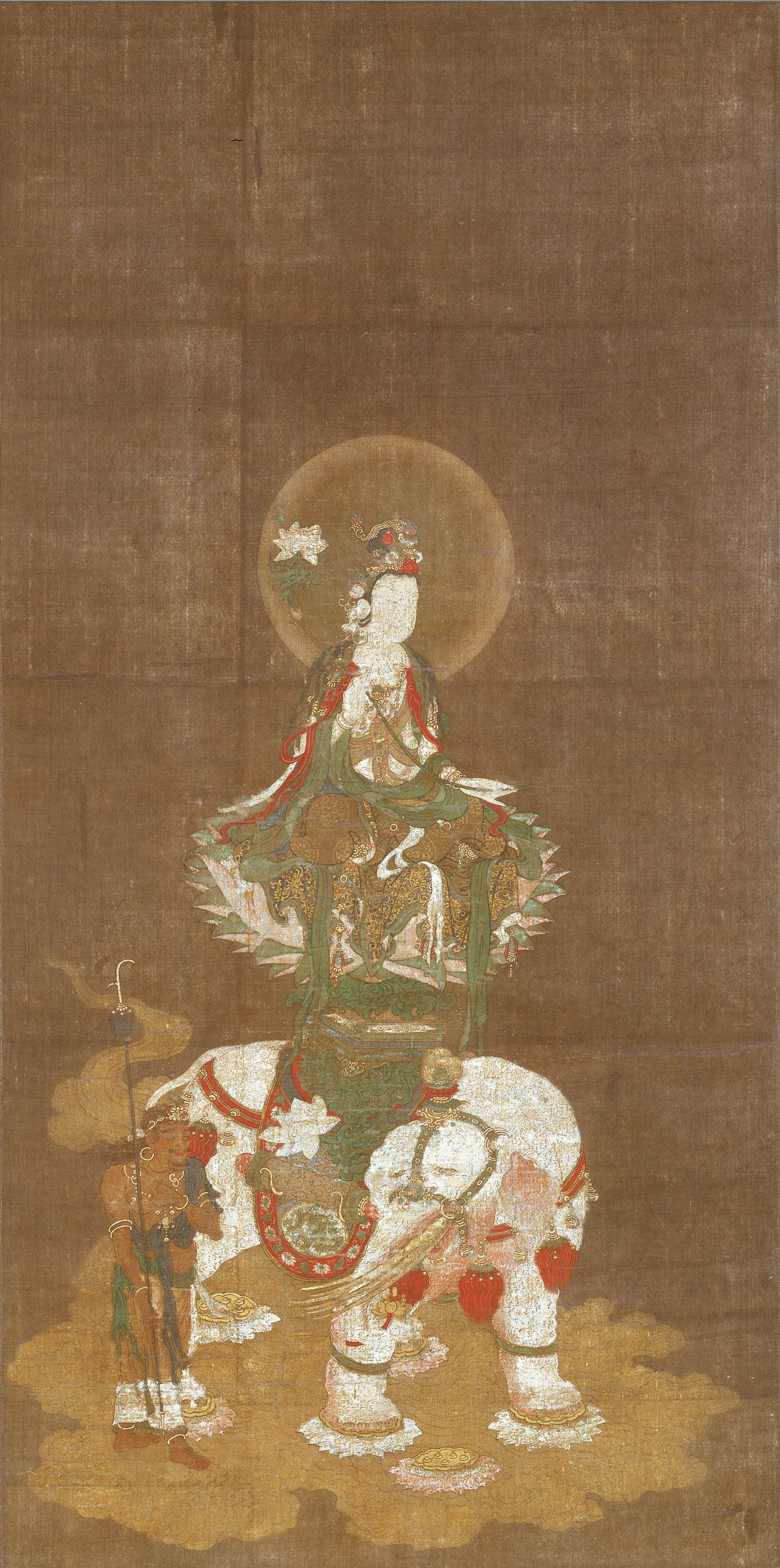
  Kamakura period (1185-1333) painting of Fugen. Held at the Nara National Museum in Nara, Japan.
  to always respond to sentient beings according to their various needs;
10. to dedicate all merits to sentient beings that they may achieve buddhahood.

The ten vows have become a common practice in East Asian Buddhism, particularly the tenth vow, with many Buddhists traditionally dedicating their merit and good works to all beings during Buddhist liturgies.

=== Mantras and dharani ===
In the Lotus Sutra, Samantabhadra teaches a protective dharani:

Adaṇḍe daṇḍapati daṇḍāvartani daṇḍakuśale daṇḍa sudhāri sudhāri sudhārapati buddhapaśyane sarvadhāraṇī āvartani sarvabhāṣyā-vartane su-āvartane saṃghaparīkṣani saṃ gha nirghātani asaṃge saṃgāpa-gate tṛ-adhvasaṃgatulyap rāpte sarvasaṃgasamatikrānte sarvadharma suparīkṣite sarva sattvarutakauśalyānugate siṃhavikrīḍite

Like all important bodhisattvas, several mantras are associated with Samantabhadra. One of these is drawn from a work titled Arya-Buddhoshnisha-Cintamani-Mahadharani:

om̐ samantabhadra sam svāhā

The Sarvadurgatiparishodana tantra contains the following mantra

om̐ samantabhadre hūm̐

Sam is Samantabhadra's seed syllable. The Dharanisamgraha meanwhile contains the following dharani for Samantabhadra:

om̐ namaḥ samantabhadrāya bodhisattvāya mahāsattvāya || tadyathā || om̐ samantabhadre sarvottama-mahāprāgbhārakalyāṇaṁ samprāpaya hūm̐ phaṭ svāhā ||

Meanwhile the Mahavairocana Sutra contains the following mantra:

namaḥ samantabuddhānāṁ saṁ

== In Daoism and folk literature ==
In Chinese folk religion and literature, Samantabhadra is also venerated under the Daoist title Puxian Zhenren (Chinese: 普贤真人; "Perfected Person Puxian"). This dual identity was part of the broader process of sanjiao heyi (the syncretism of the Three Teachings), which became particularly prominent during the Ming and Qing periods. According to research by Chinese Academy of Social Sciences scholar Fang Litian, Samantabhadra's widespread popularity in Chinese Buddhism led to his incorporation into Daoist traditions, where he was given the title of Zhenren. Mount Emei was also associated with this blending of traditions; before becoming the Buddhist bodhimanda of Samantabhadra, it was regarded as a Daoist sacred site with temples and hermits. As a result, local traditions came to associate Puxian with both Buddhist and Daoist attributes.

Puxian Zhenren appears as a major character in the 16th-century Chinese novel Investiture of the Gods (Fengshen Yanyi). In the novel, he is presented as a high-ranking Daoist immortal and one of the Twelve Golden Immortals (十二金仙) under Yuanshi Tianzun. He resides in the White Crane Cave on Jiugong Mountain and is the master of Muzha, the elder brother of Nezha, whom he equips with the Twin Wu Gou Swords (吴钩双剑).

The novel also provides a mythological explanation for Puxian Zhenren's later association with Buddhist iconography. During the Battle of the Myriad Immortal Array (万仙阵), Puxian defeats the Jie Sect immortal Lingya Xian (灵牙仙). After his defeat, Lingya Xian reveals his true form as a six-tusked white elephant (六牙白象), which becomes Puxian's mount. Following the conclusion of the Fengshen campaign, the novel depicts Puxian Zhenren, together with Cihang Daoren and Wenshu Guangfa Tianzun, leaving the Daoist Chan Sect and joining the Western Sect (西方教), where they become the Buddhist figures Samantabhadra, Guanyin, and Manjushri respectively.

== In East Asian Buddhism ==
Unlike his more popular counterpart Mañjuśrī, Samantabhadra is only rarely depicted alone and is usually found in a trinity on the right side of Shakyamuni, mounted on Six-tusked White Elephant. In those traditions that accept the Avatamsaka Sutra as their main text (mainly, the Huayan school), Samantabhadra and Manjusri flank Vairocana Buddha, the central Buddha of this particular sutra.

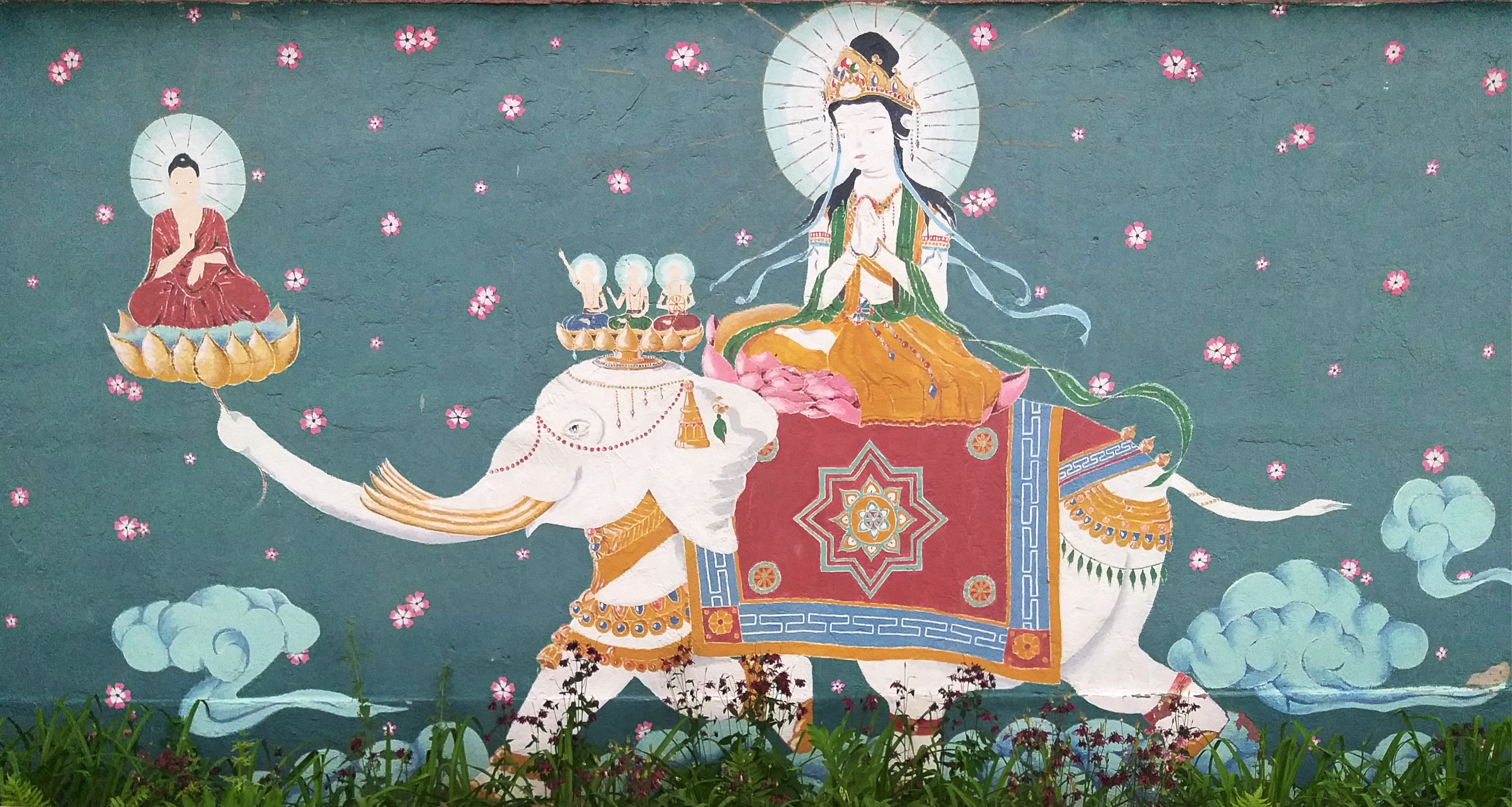

Known as Puxian in Chinese, Samantabhadra is sometimes shown in Chinese art with feminine characteristics, riding an elephant with six tusks while carrying either a lotus leaf 'parasol' (Sanskrit: chatra), ruyi scepter, or sutra scroll, bearing similar dress and features to some feminine depictions of Guanyin. It is in this guise that Samantabhadra is revered as the patron bodhisattva of the monasteries associated with Mount Emei in western China. Some believe that the white elephant mount of Samantabhadra was the same elephant that appeared to Queen Maya, the mother of the Buddha, to herald his birth.

Mahayana esoteric traditions sometimes treat Samantabhadra as one of the 'Primordial' (Sanskrit: Dharmakaya) Buddhas, but the main primordial Buddha is considered to be Mahāvairocana.

== Tibetan Buddhism ==
In Tibetan Buddhism, Samantabhadra (Tibetan: Kuntuzangpo) is a name that refers to two different beings:

- The Bodhisattva Samantabhadra, one of the eight main bodhisattva attendants of Shakyamuni Buddha, i.e. one of the "eight close sons."
- The Primordial Buddha (Adi-Buddha) Samantabhadra (known as Vajradhara in the Sarma traditions). Samantabhadra Buddha appears in the Kunjed Gyalpo Tantra, as the "All-Creating King", the "embodiment" (Sanskrit: kaya) or "field" (kṣetra) of "timeless awareness, gnosis" (Sanskrit: jñāna). This Buddha is ultimate reality, which according to Dzongsar Khyentse Rinpoche is "the unity of awareness and emptiness, the unity of appearances and emptiness, the nature of mind, natural clarity with unceasing compassion." This Buddha appears in various Nyingma sources, like The Mirror of the Mind of Samantabhadra, one of the Seventeen Tantras of Dzogchen.

== Gallery ==
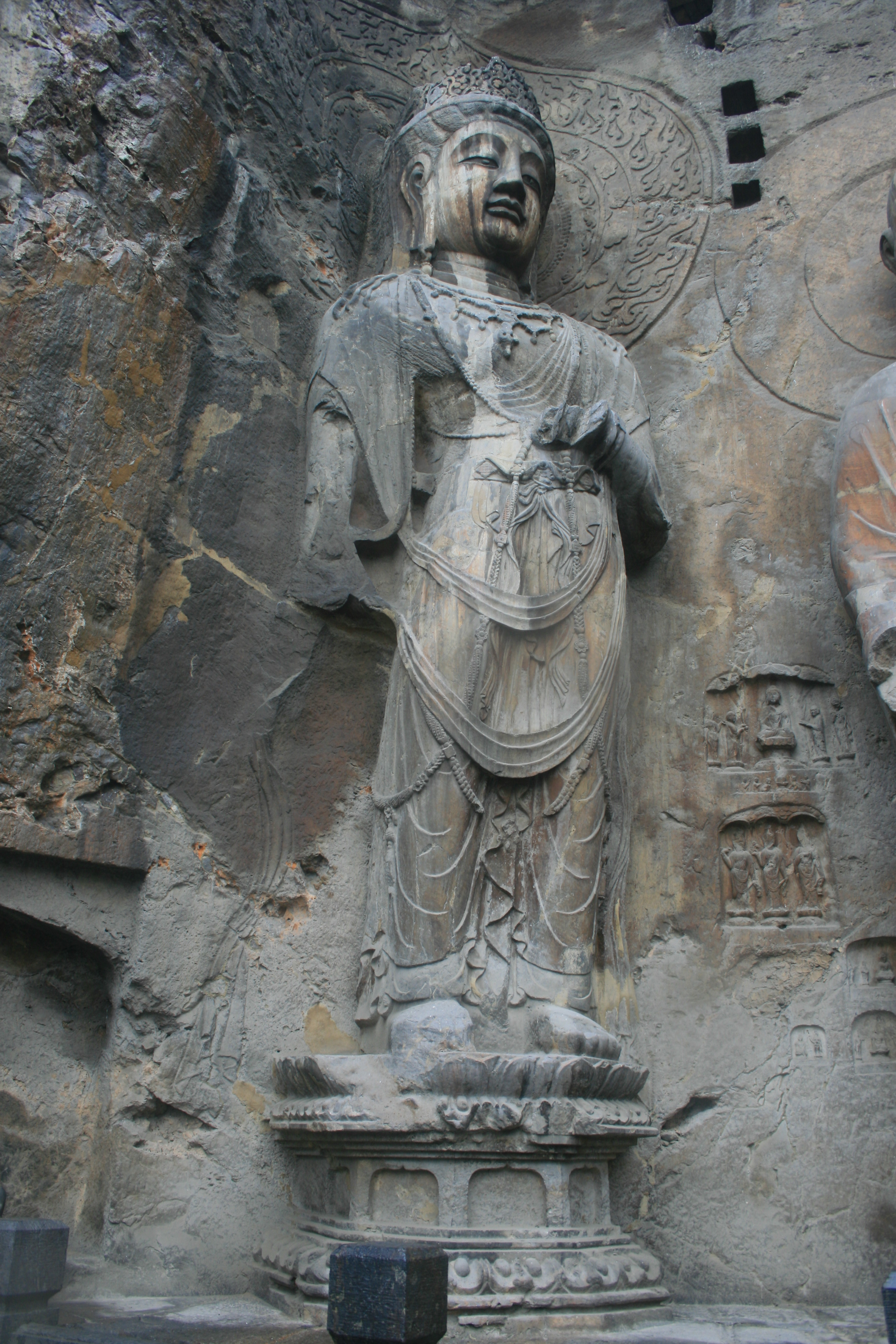
Tang dynasty (618-907) statue of Puxian at Longmen Grottoes in Luoyang, Henan, China.

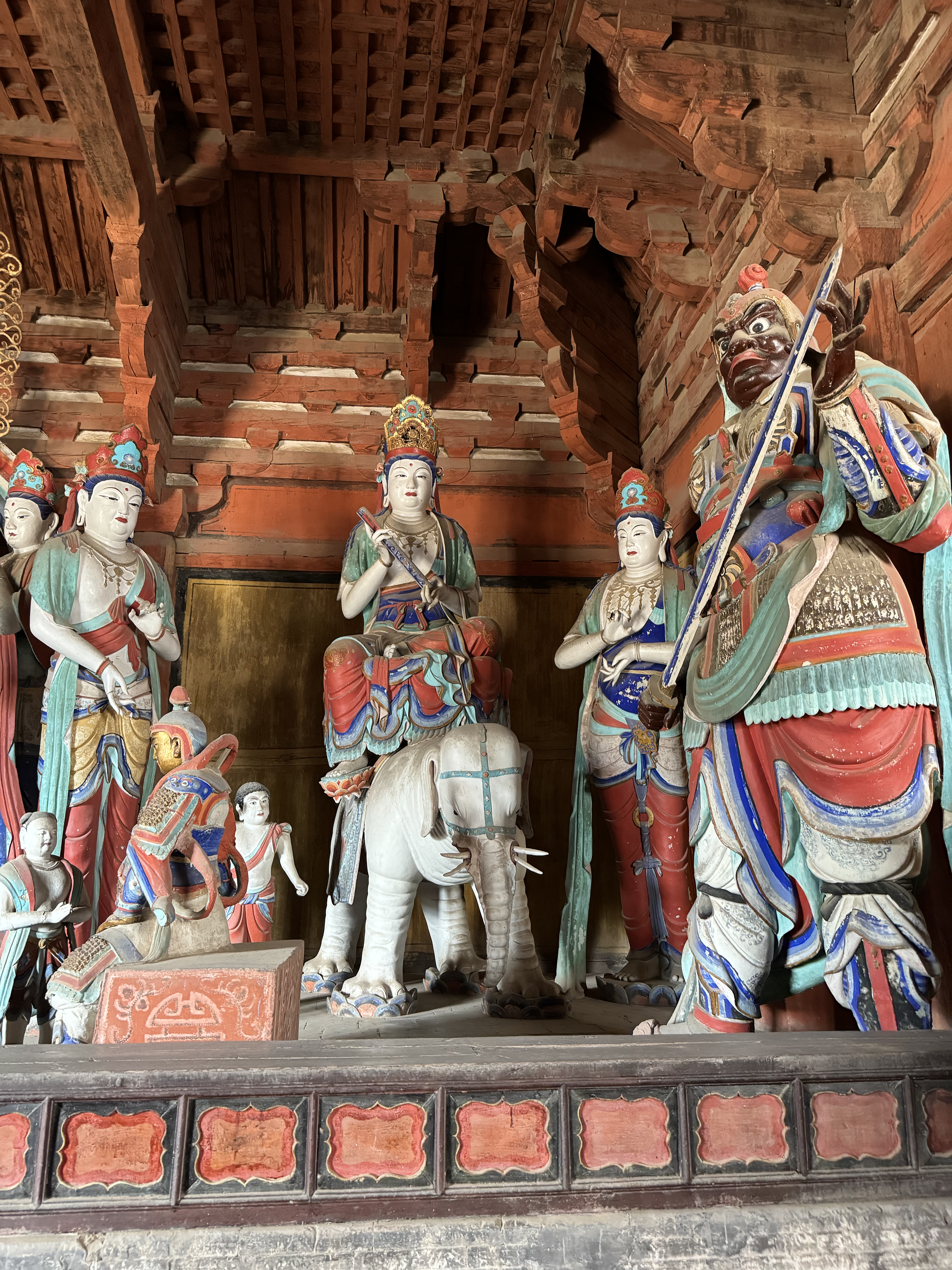
Tang dynasty (618-907) statues of Puxian surrounded by attendant bodhisattvas and a heavenly king at Foguang Temple in Wutai, Shanxi, China.

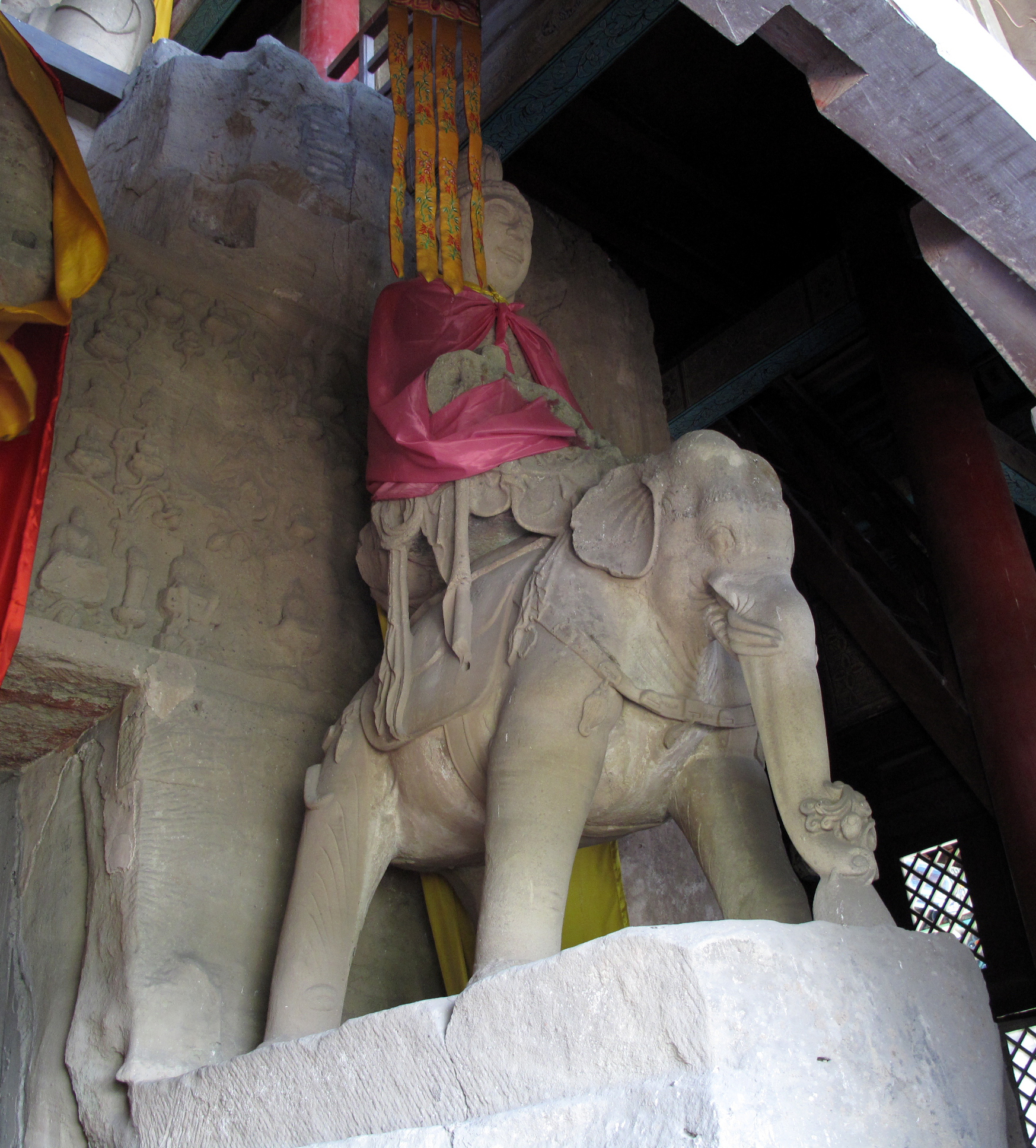
Statue of Puxian at Tianlongshan Grottoes in Shanxi, China. Flanking a central statue of Shiyimian Guanyin together with the bodhisattvas Wenshu.

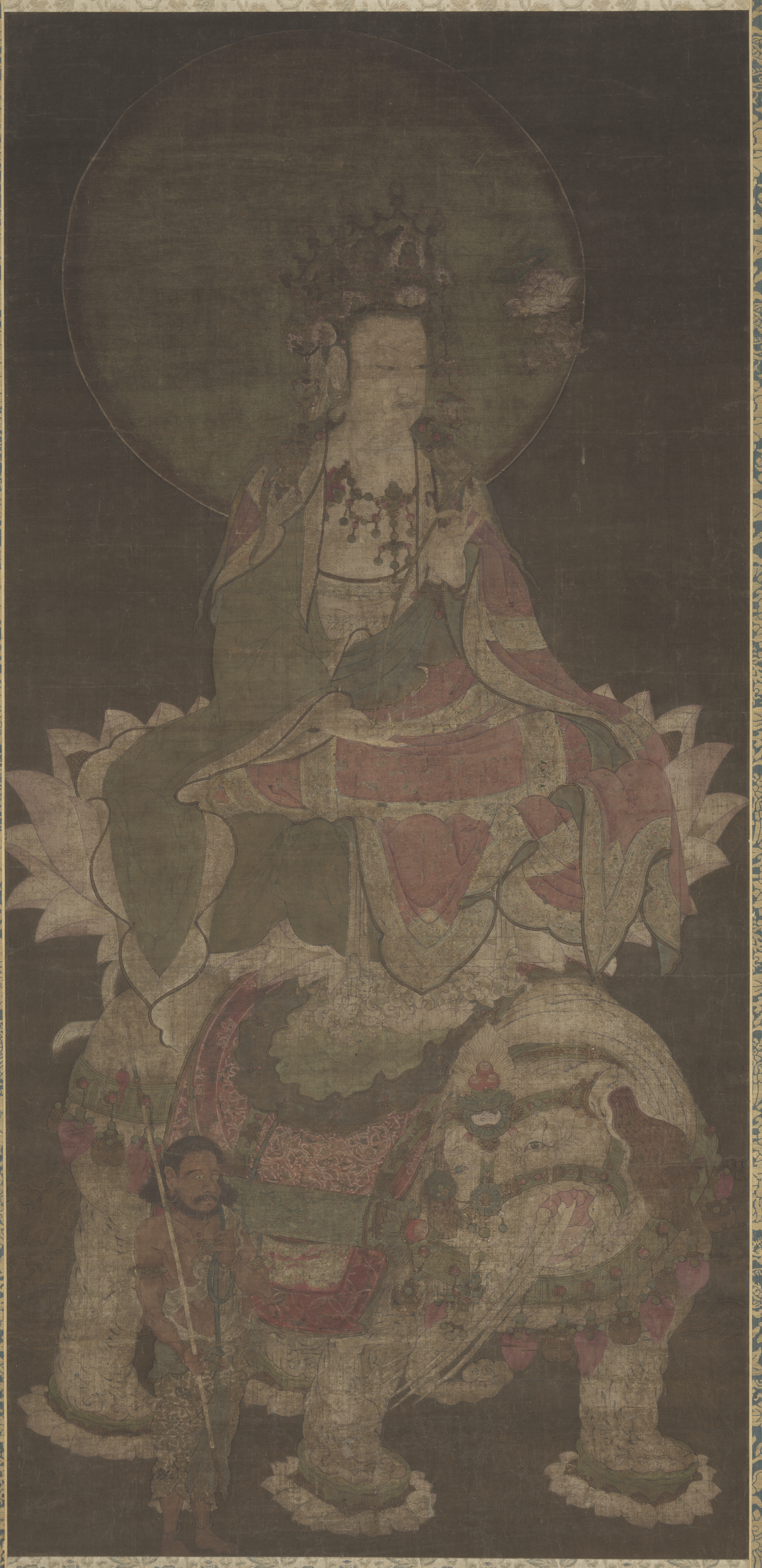
Song dynasty (960-1279) painting of Puxian. Held at the Cleveland Museum of Art in Ohio, USA.

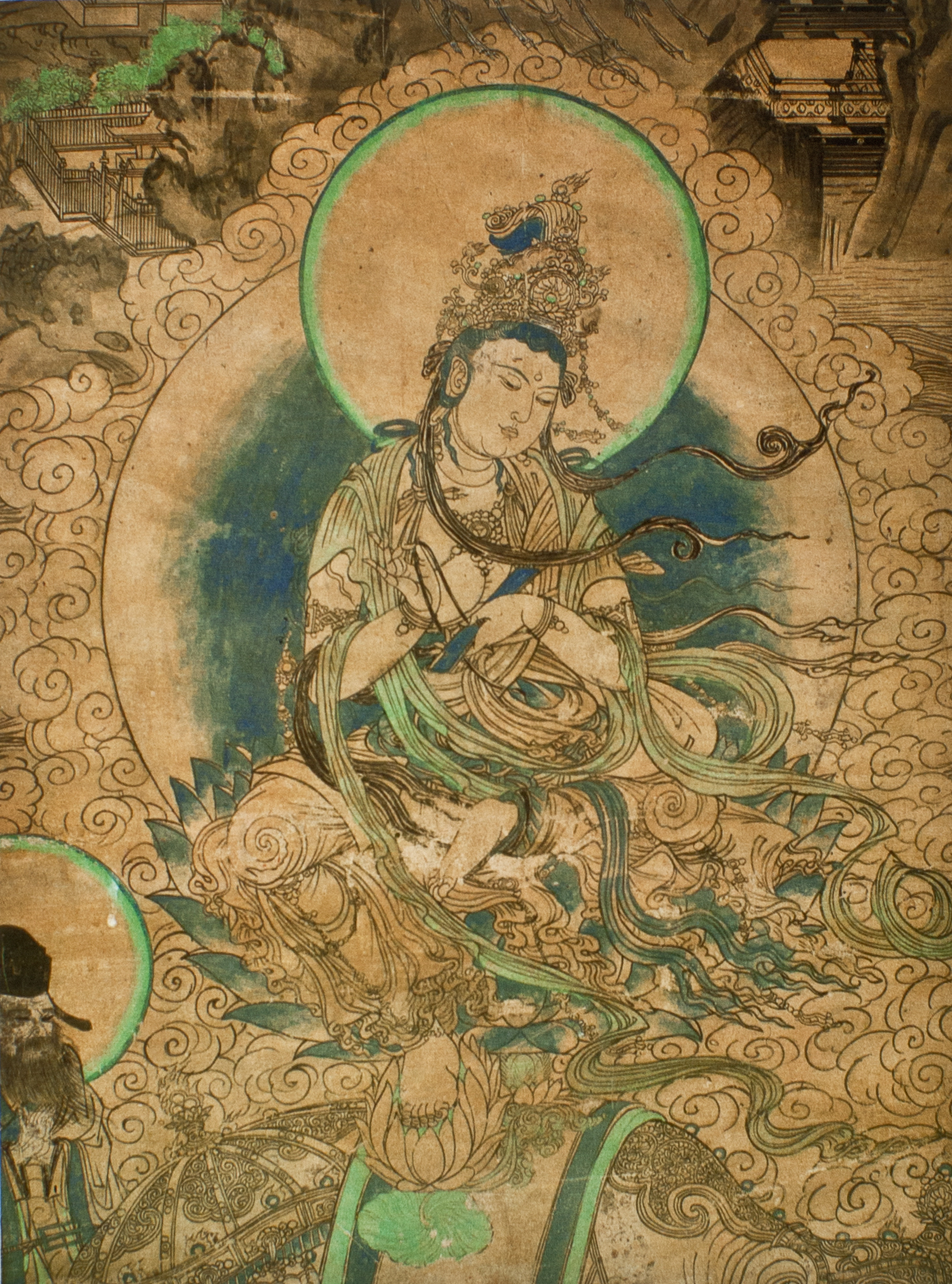
Western Xia (1038-1227) mural of Puxian at the Yulin Cave in Gansu, China.

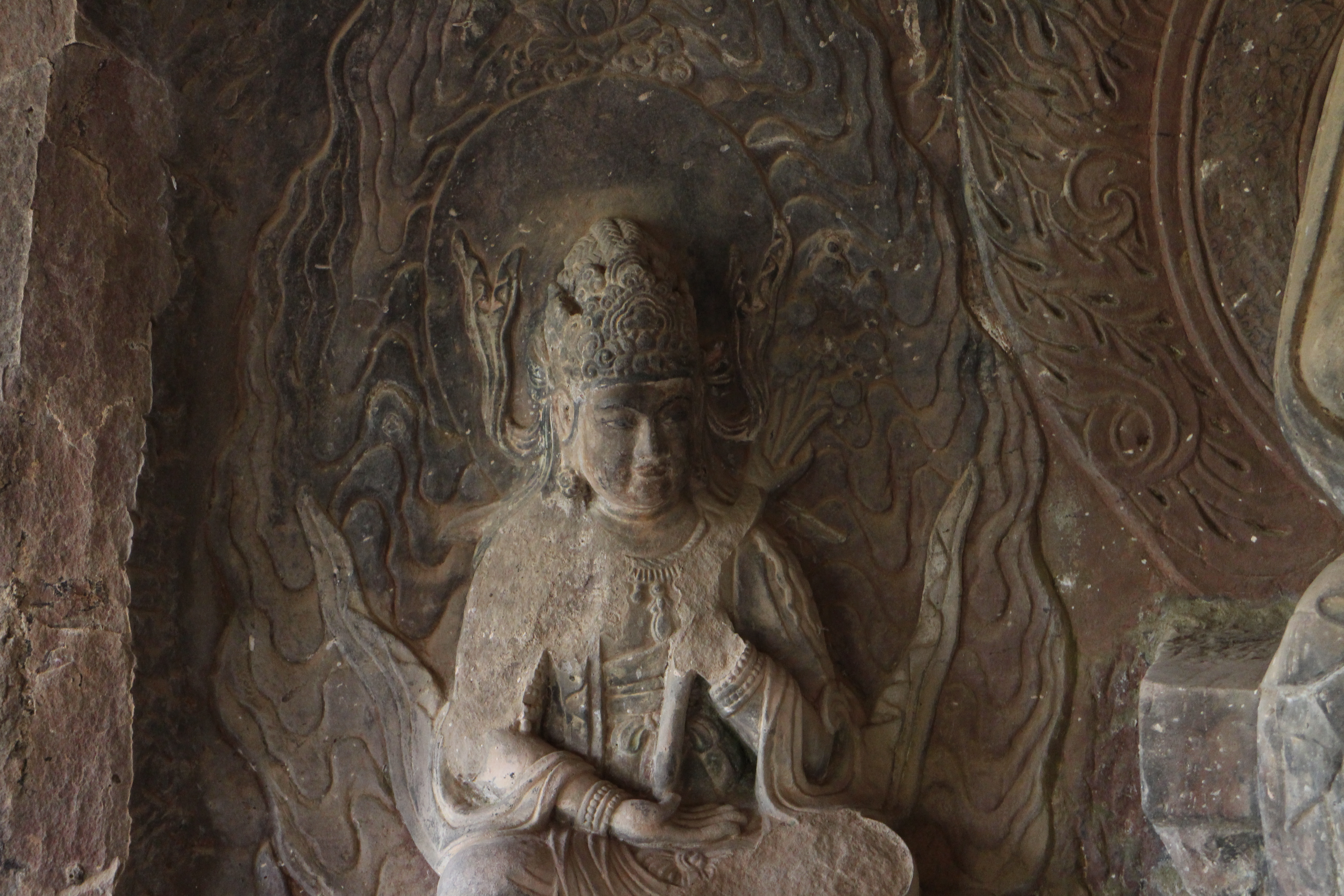
Late Nanzhao (738-902) to early Dali period (937-1253) stone carving of Puxian as part of a triad together with the Buddha Piluzhena and the Bodhisattva Wenshu at the Shizhongshan Grottes in Dali Bai, Yunnan, China.

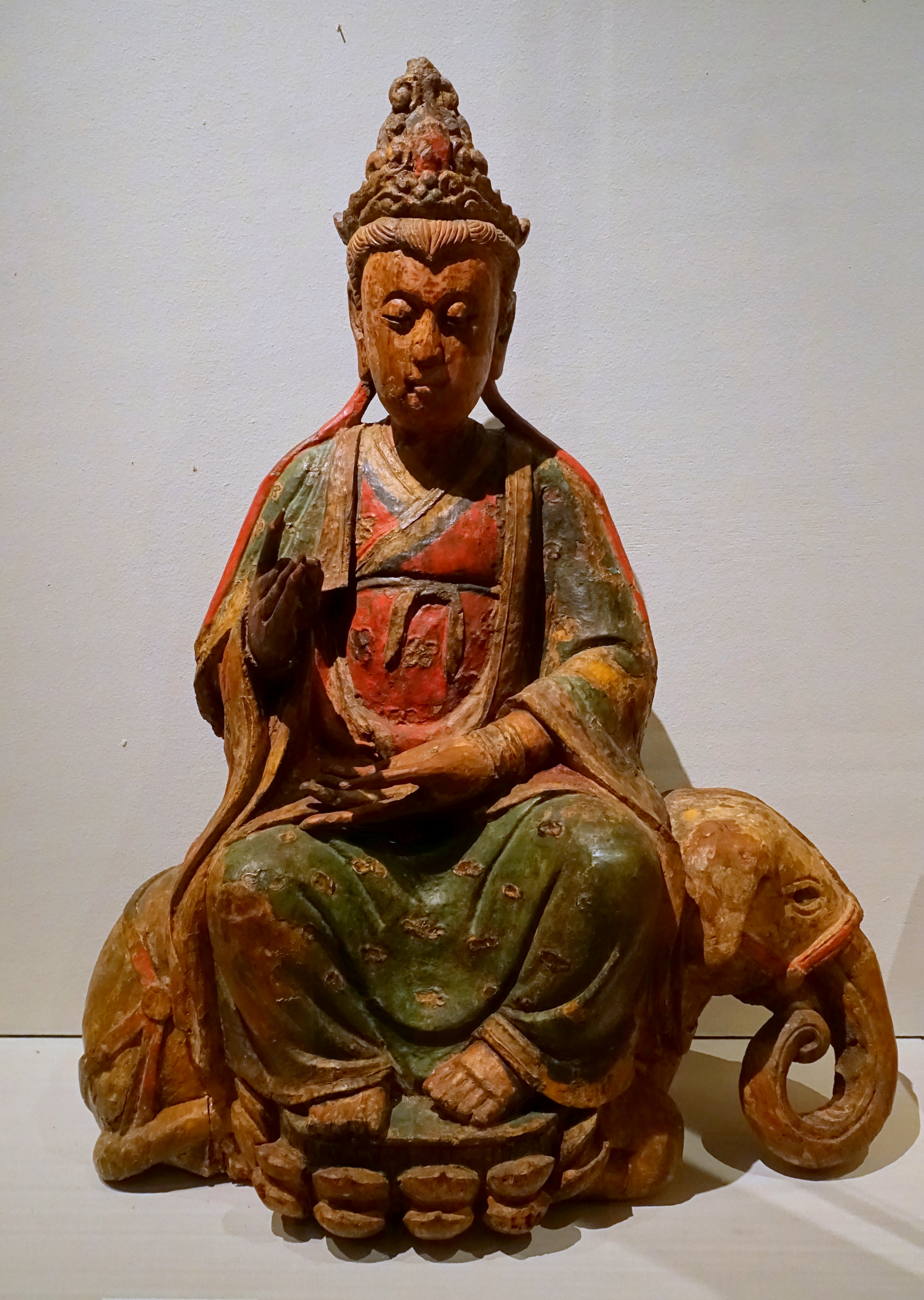
Ming dynasty (1368-1644) statue of Puxian. Held at the Linden Museum in Stuttgart, Germany. Carved around 1500.

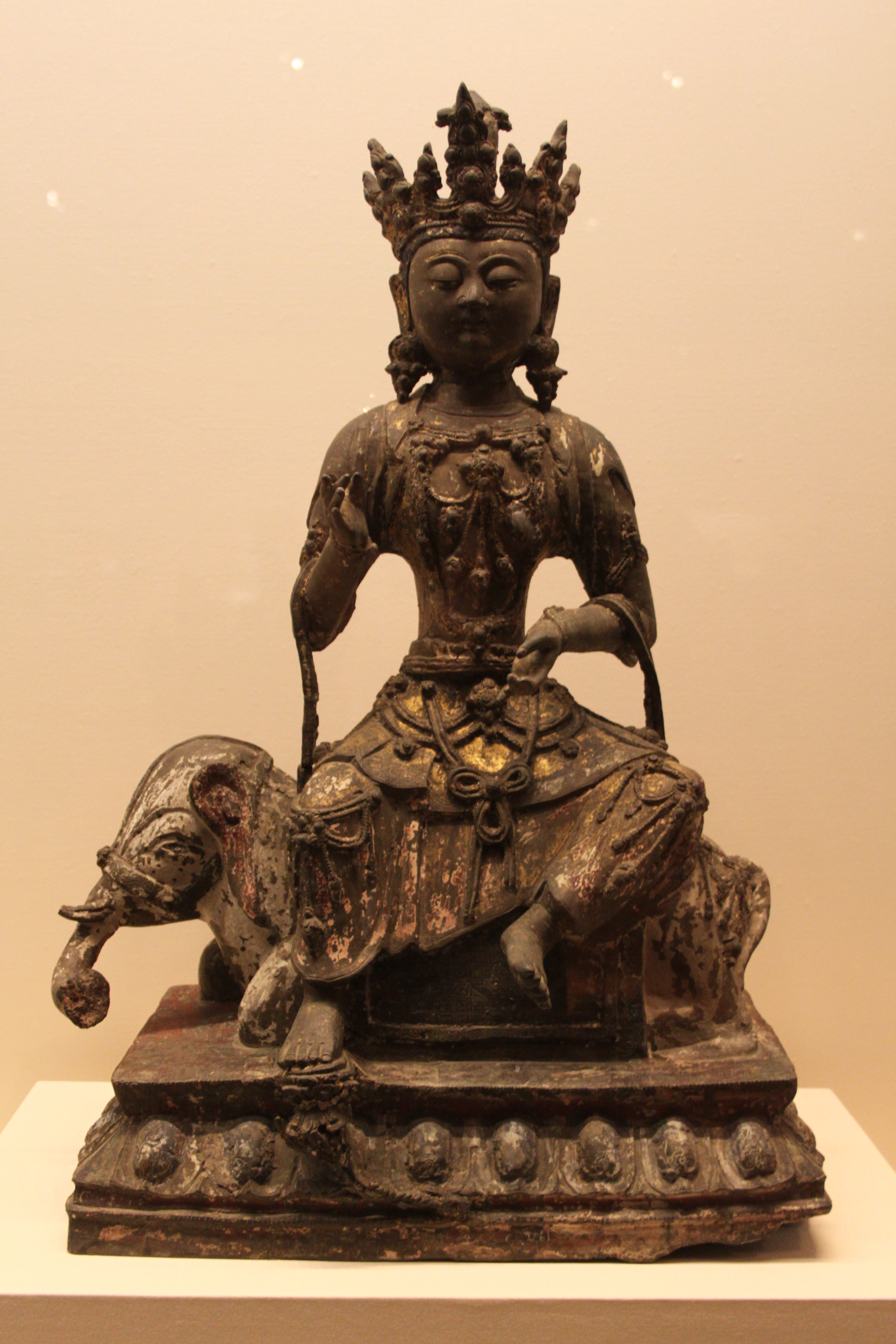
Ming dynasty (1368-1644) statue of Puxian. Held at the National Museum of China in Beijing, China.

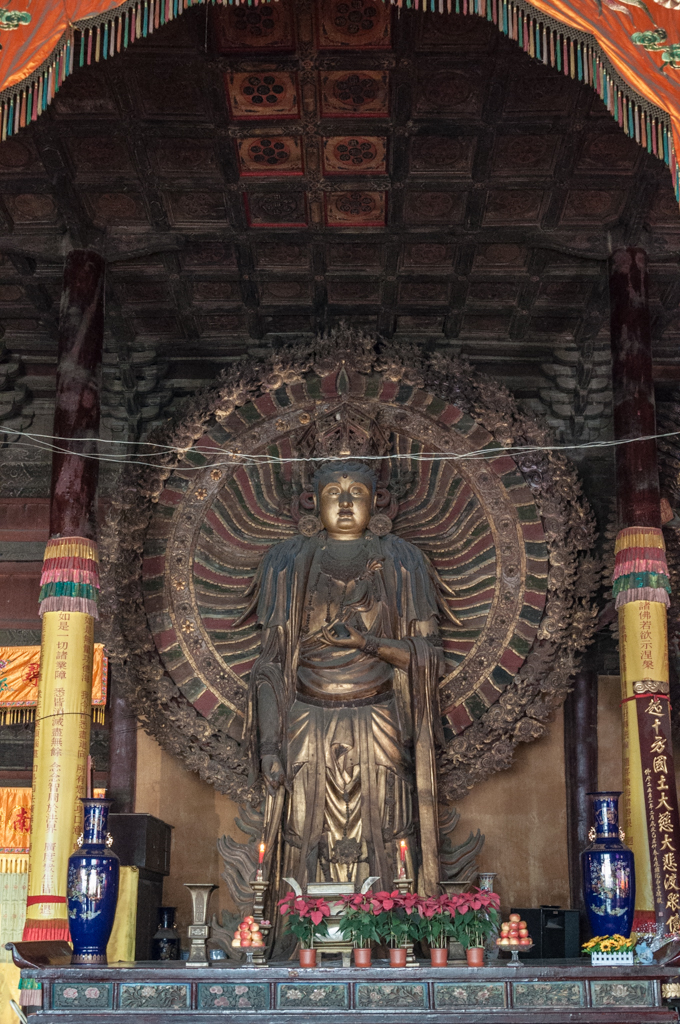
Ming dynasty (1368 - 1644) statue of Puxian in Chongshan Temple, Shanxi, China.

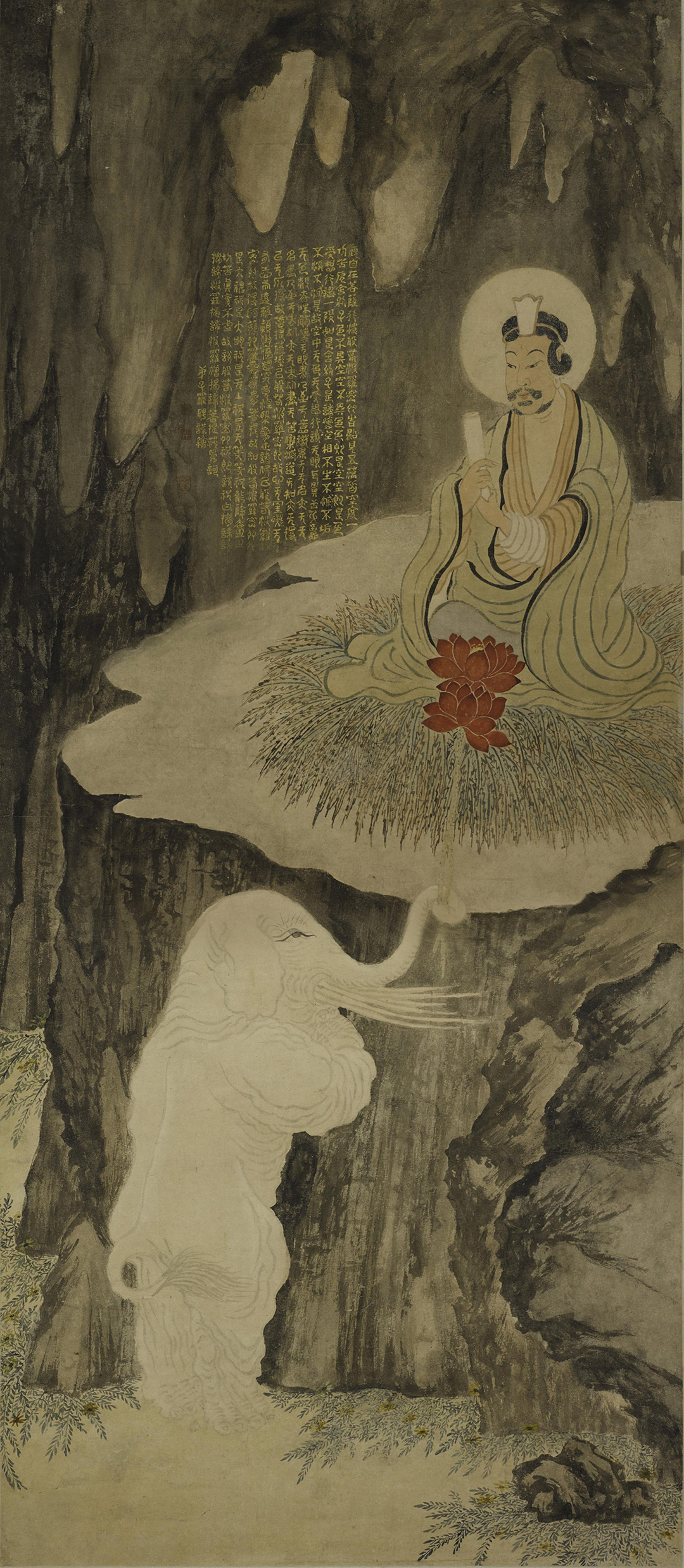
Qing dynasty (1644-1912) painting of Puxian with his six-tusked white elephant mount by Luo Ping. Held at the Shanghai Museum in Shanghai, China.

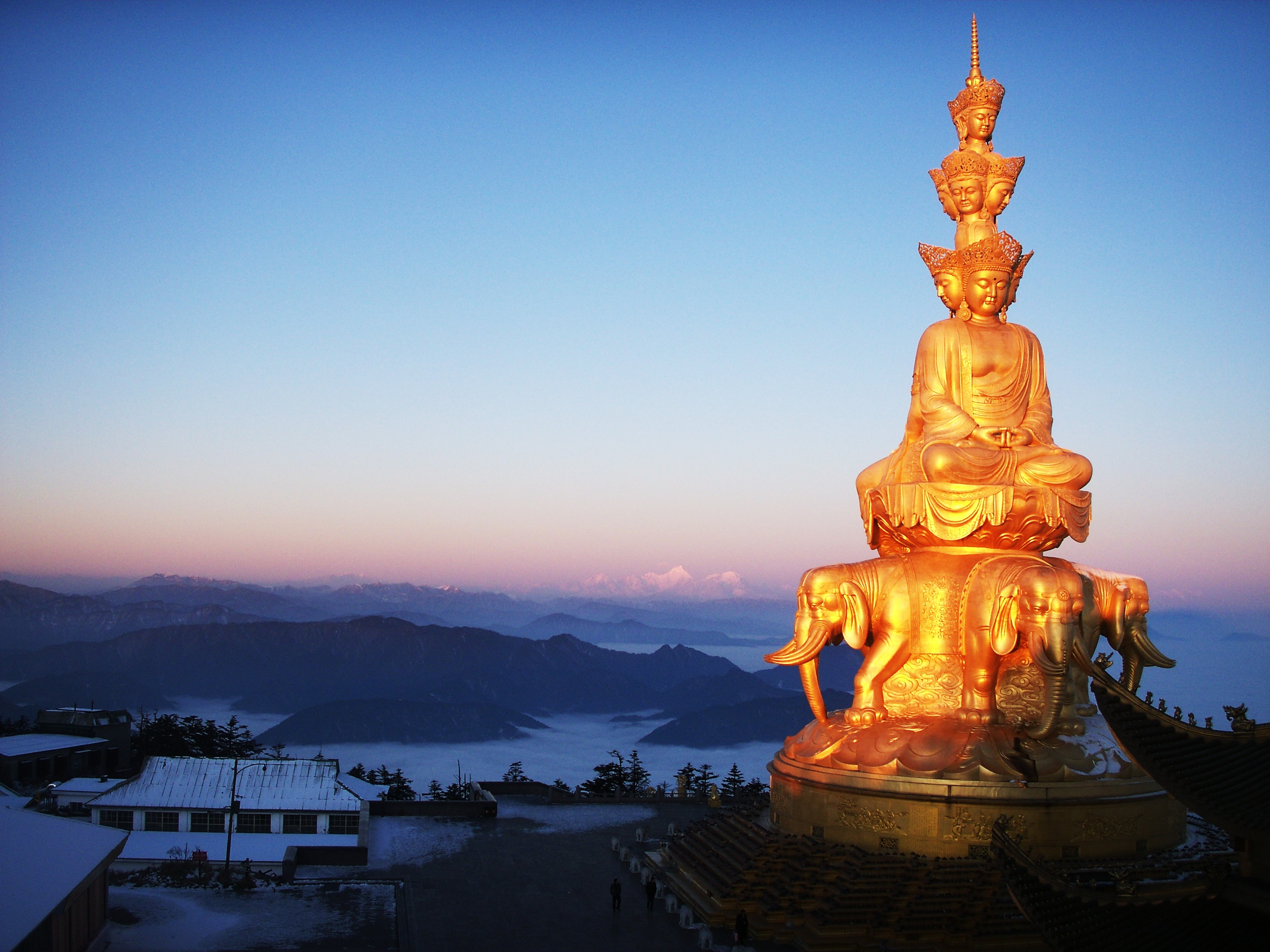
Statue of Puxian on the summit of Mount Emei in Sichuan, China.

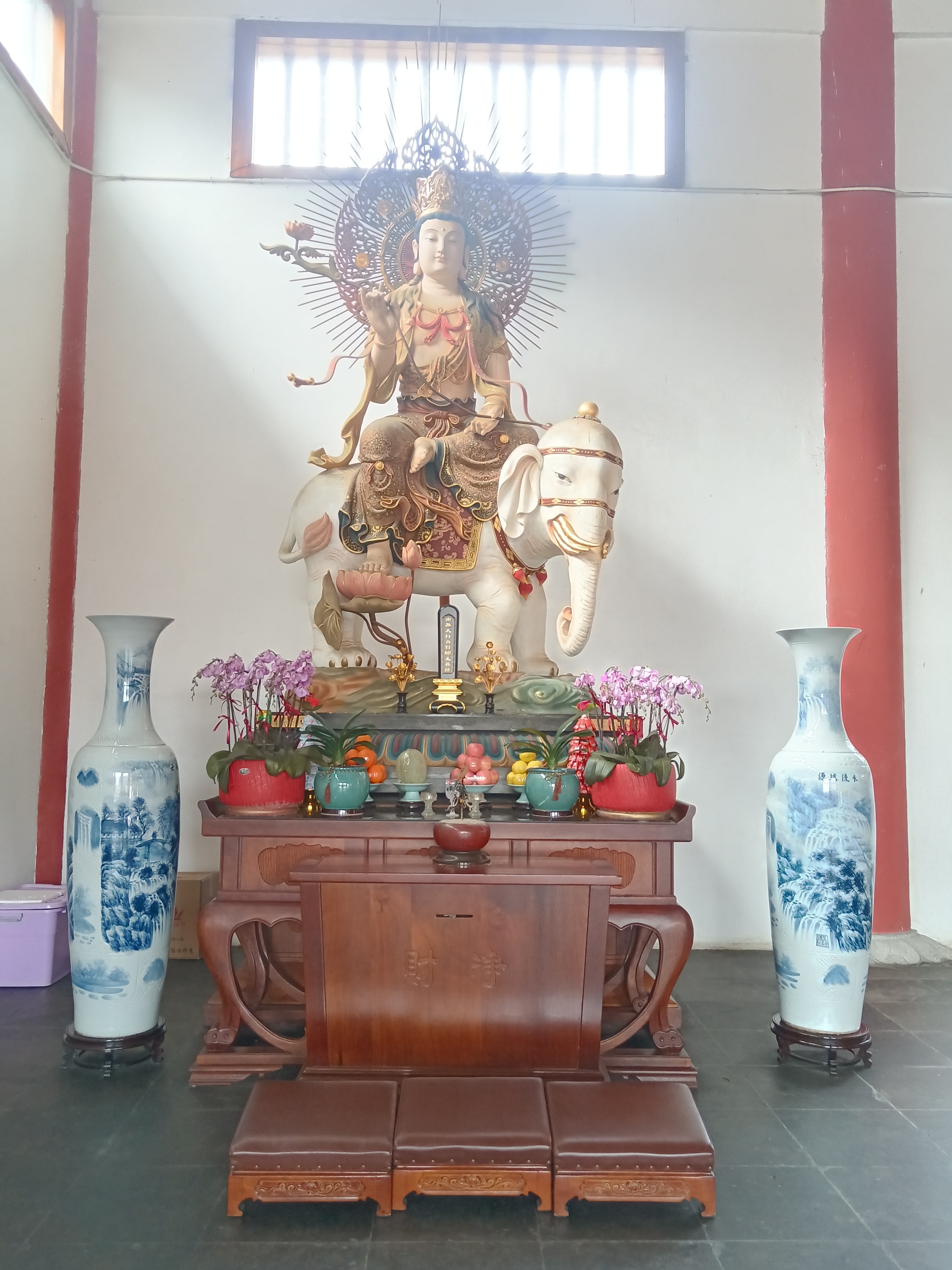
Statue of Puxian in Baoning Temple in Changsha, Hunan, China.

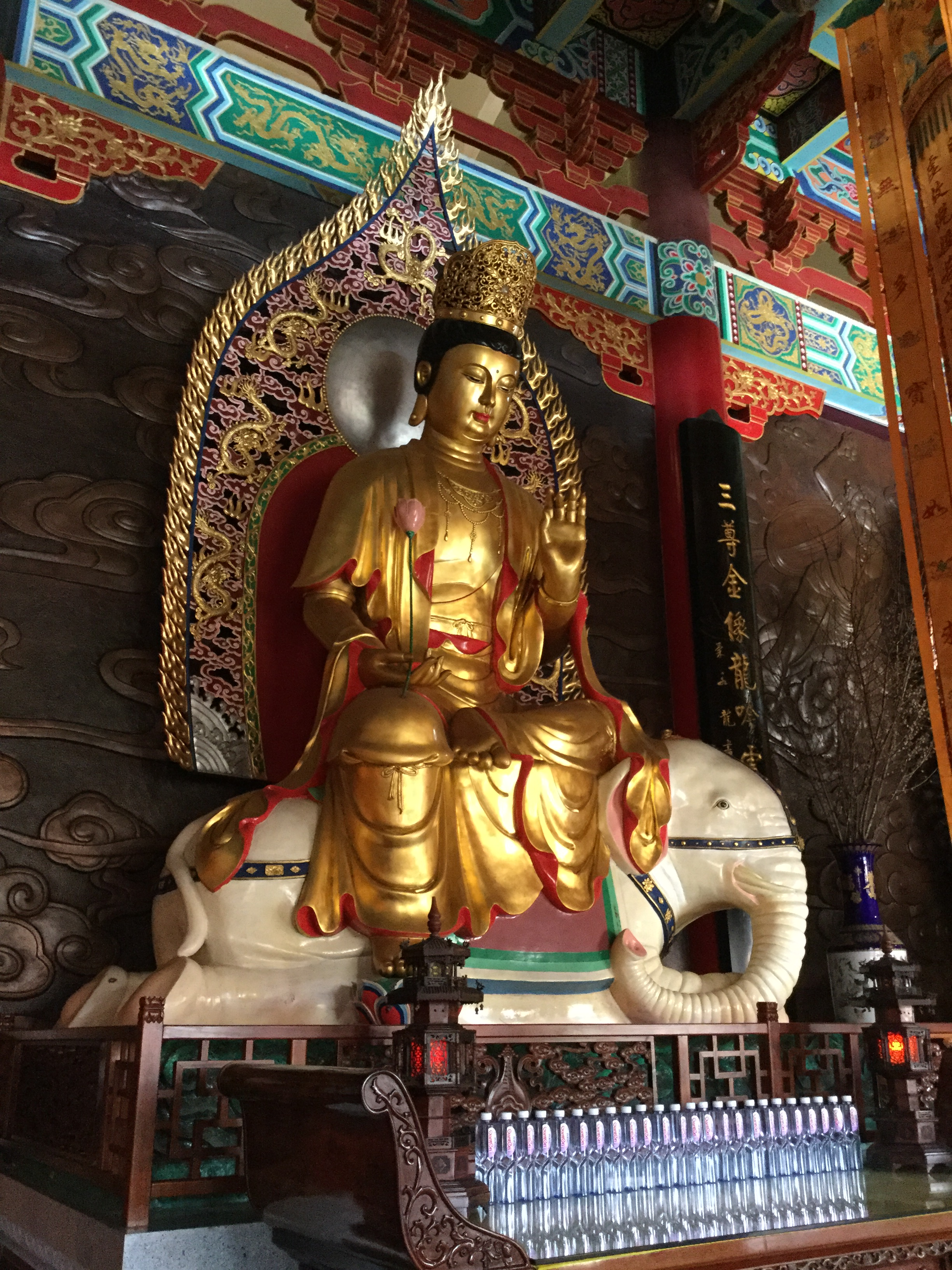
Statue of Puxian at Jiutian Chan Temple in Tiantan Garden in Shantou, Guangdong, China.

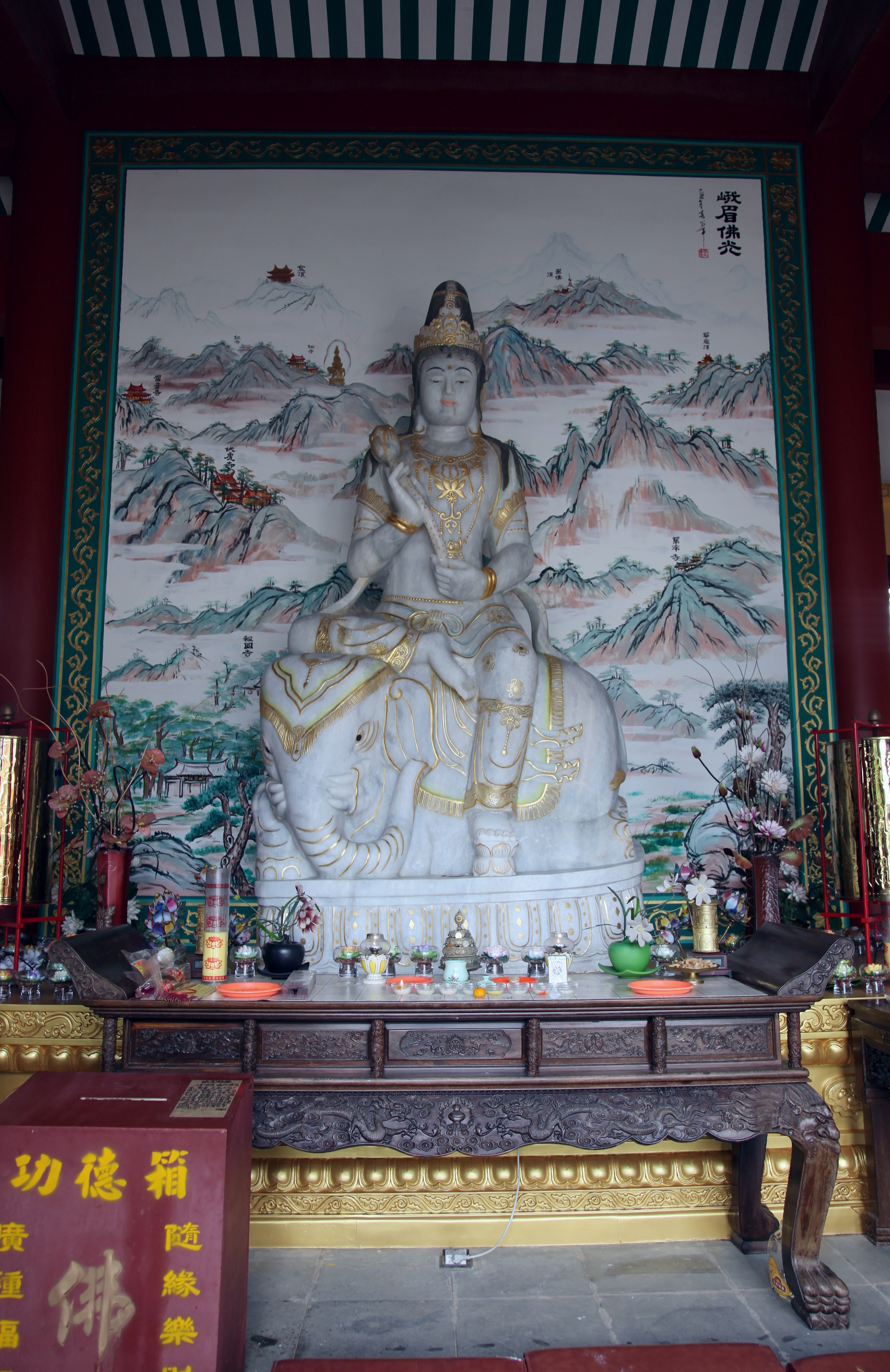
Statue of Puxian at Yongqing Temple in Chengmai, Hainan, China.

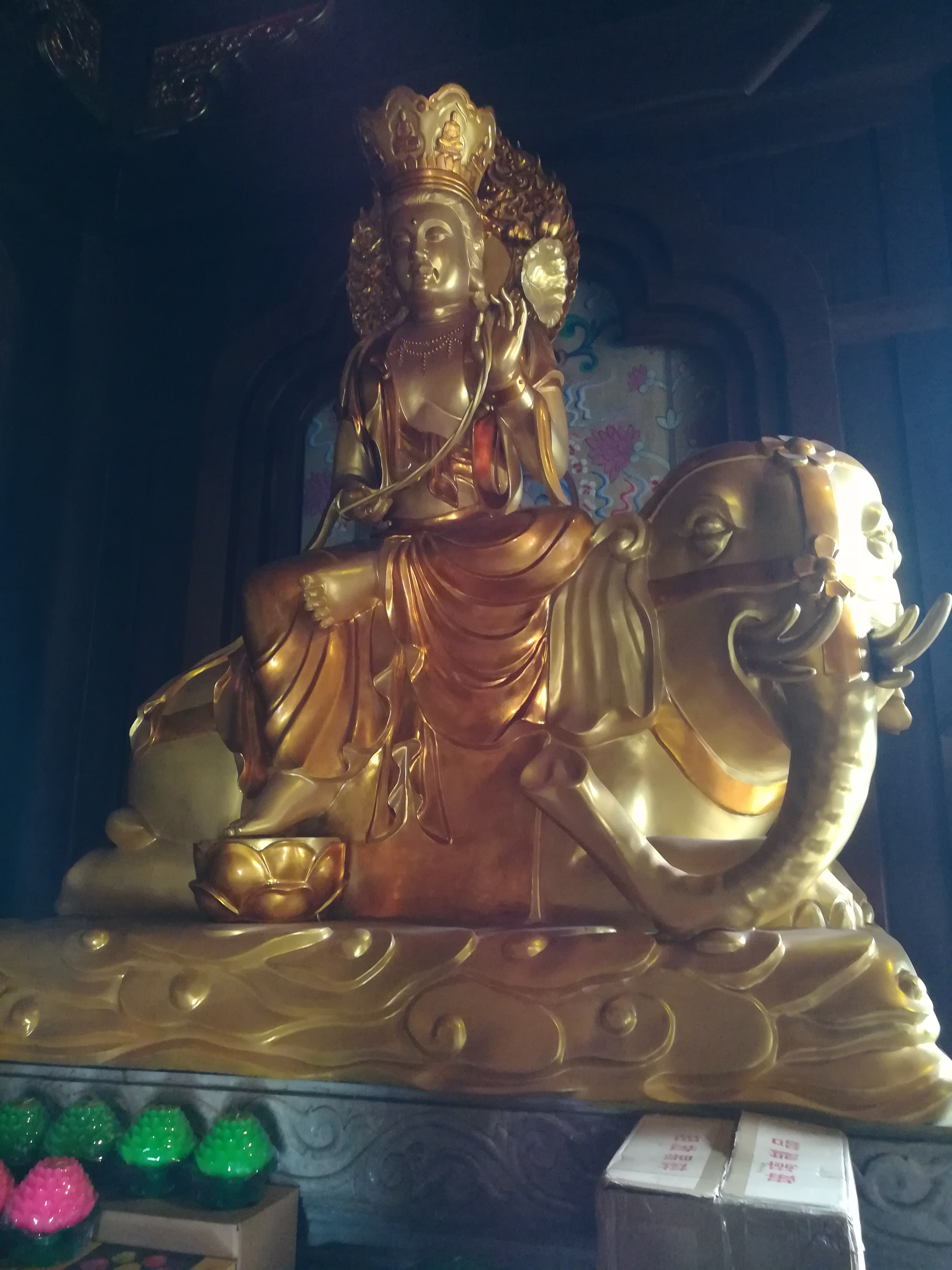
Statue of Puxian at the Daxiong Baodian of Zhaoshan Temple in Xiangtan, Hunan, China.

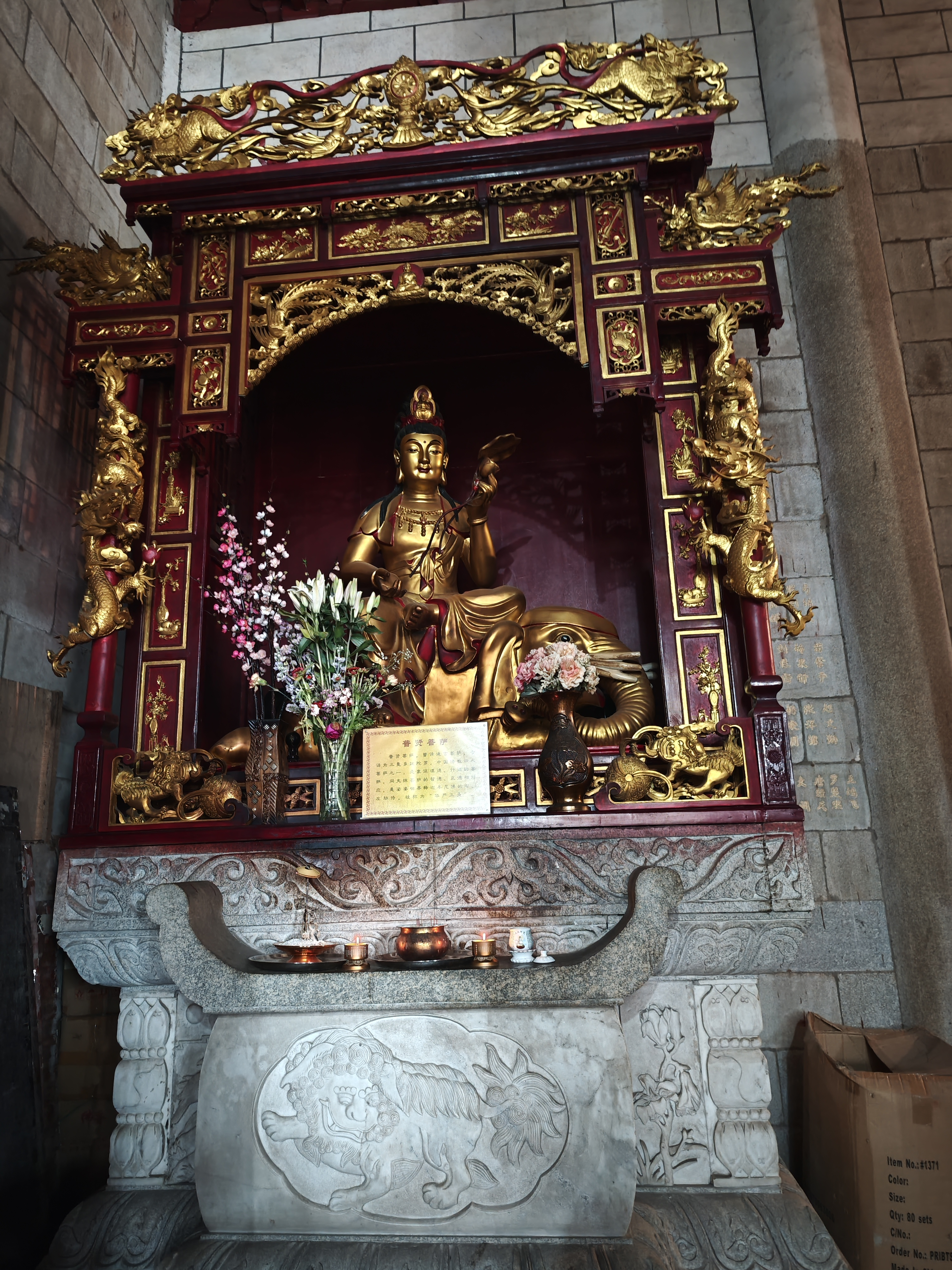
Statue of Puxian at Zifu Temple in Zhuzhou, Hunan, China.

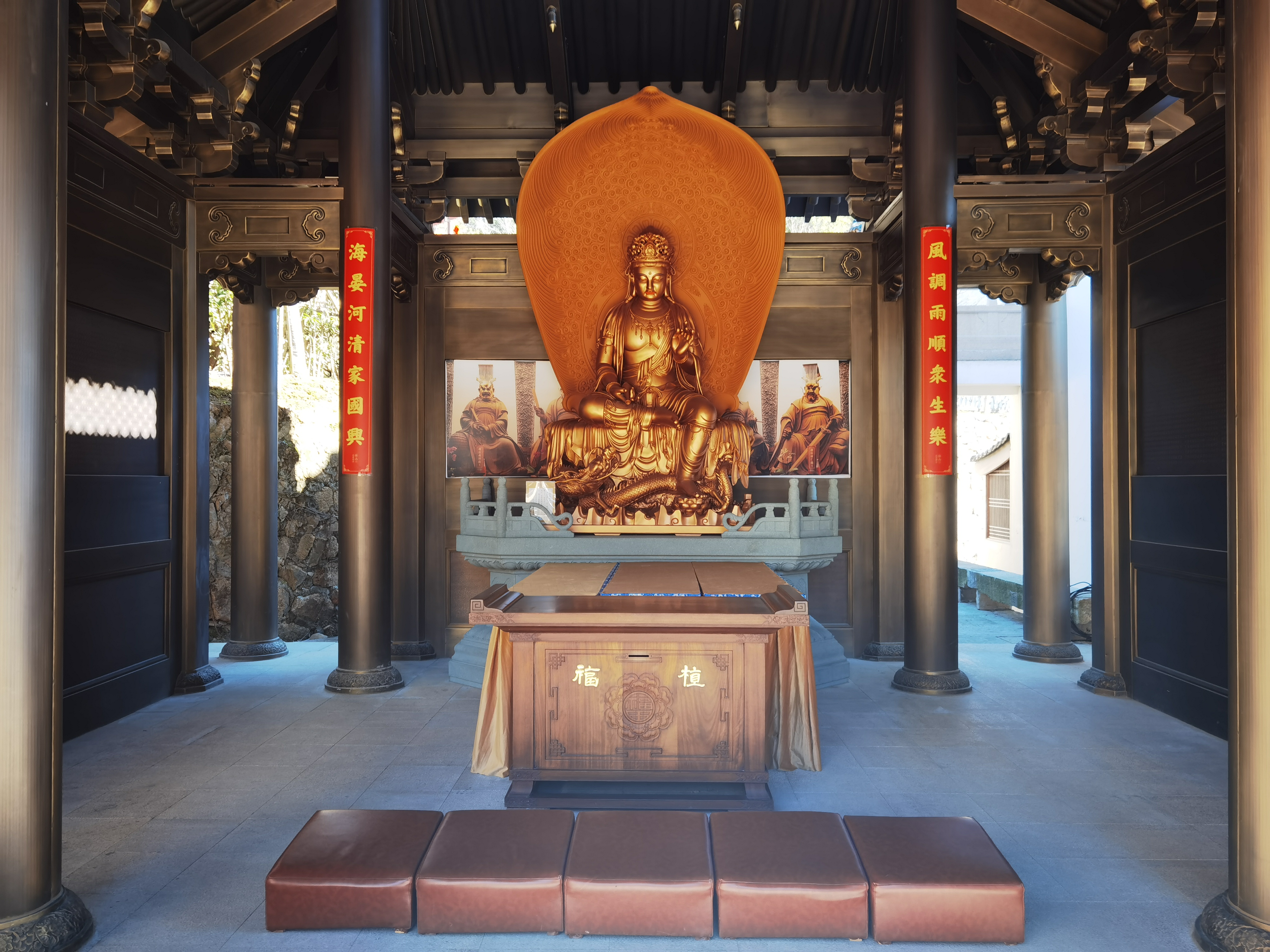
Statue of Puxian at Jingshan Temple in Hangzhou, Zhejiang, China.

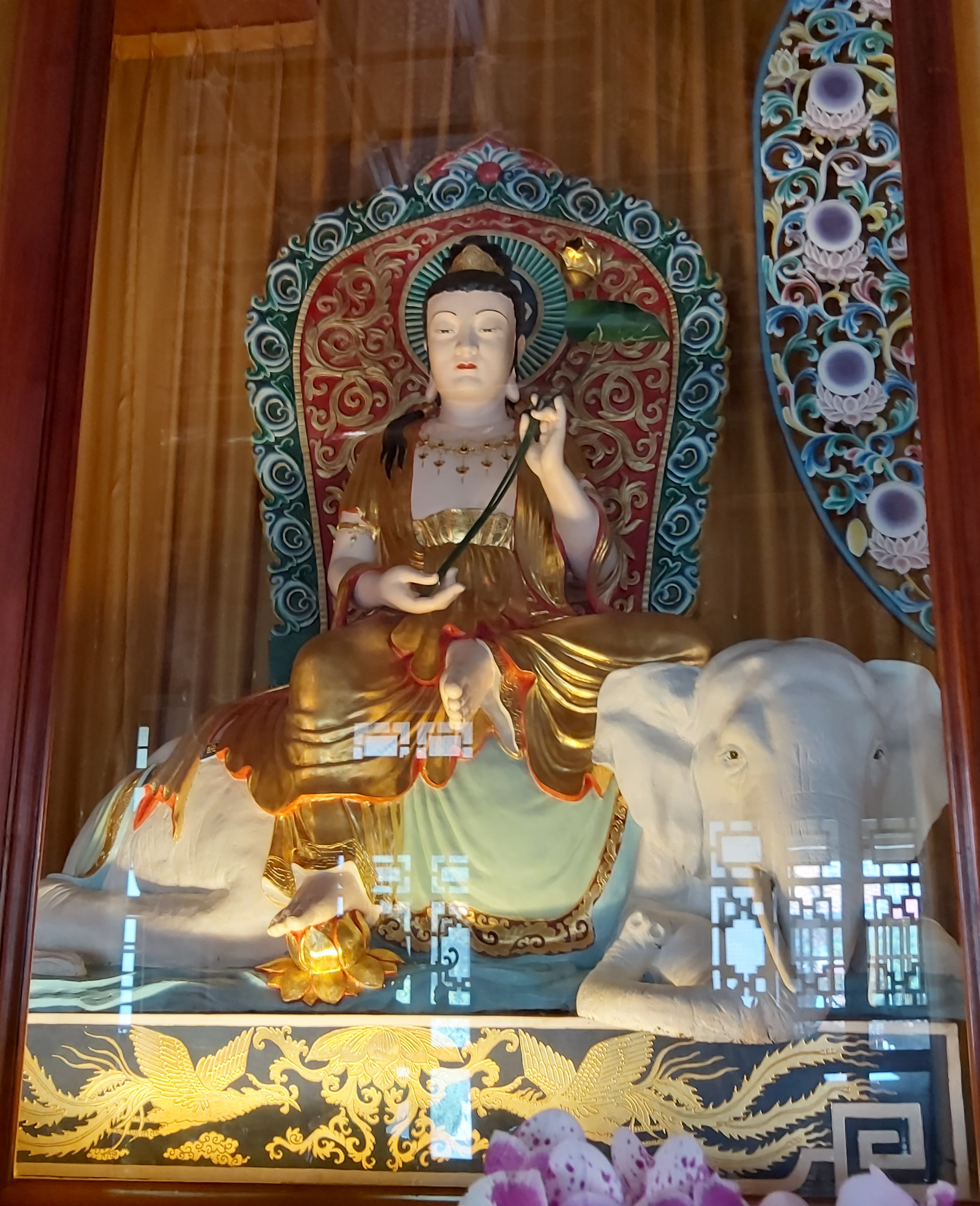
Statue of Puxian at the Daxiong Baodian of Yuanguang Chan Temple in Taoyuan, Taiwan.

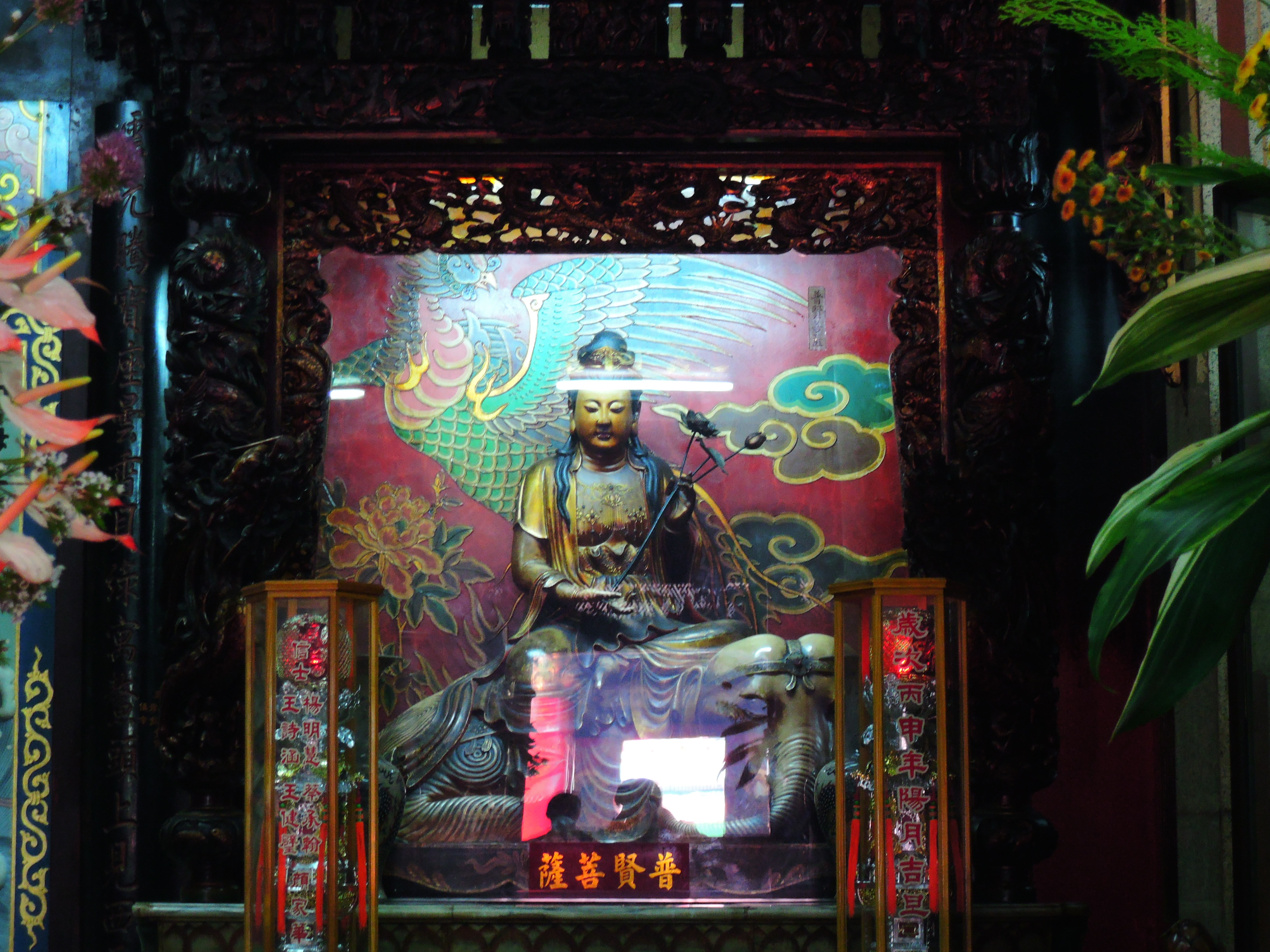
Statue of Puxian at Zi Yun Yan in Taichung, Taiwan.

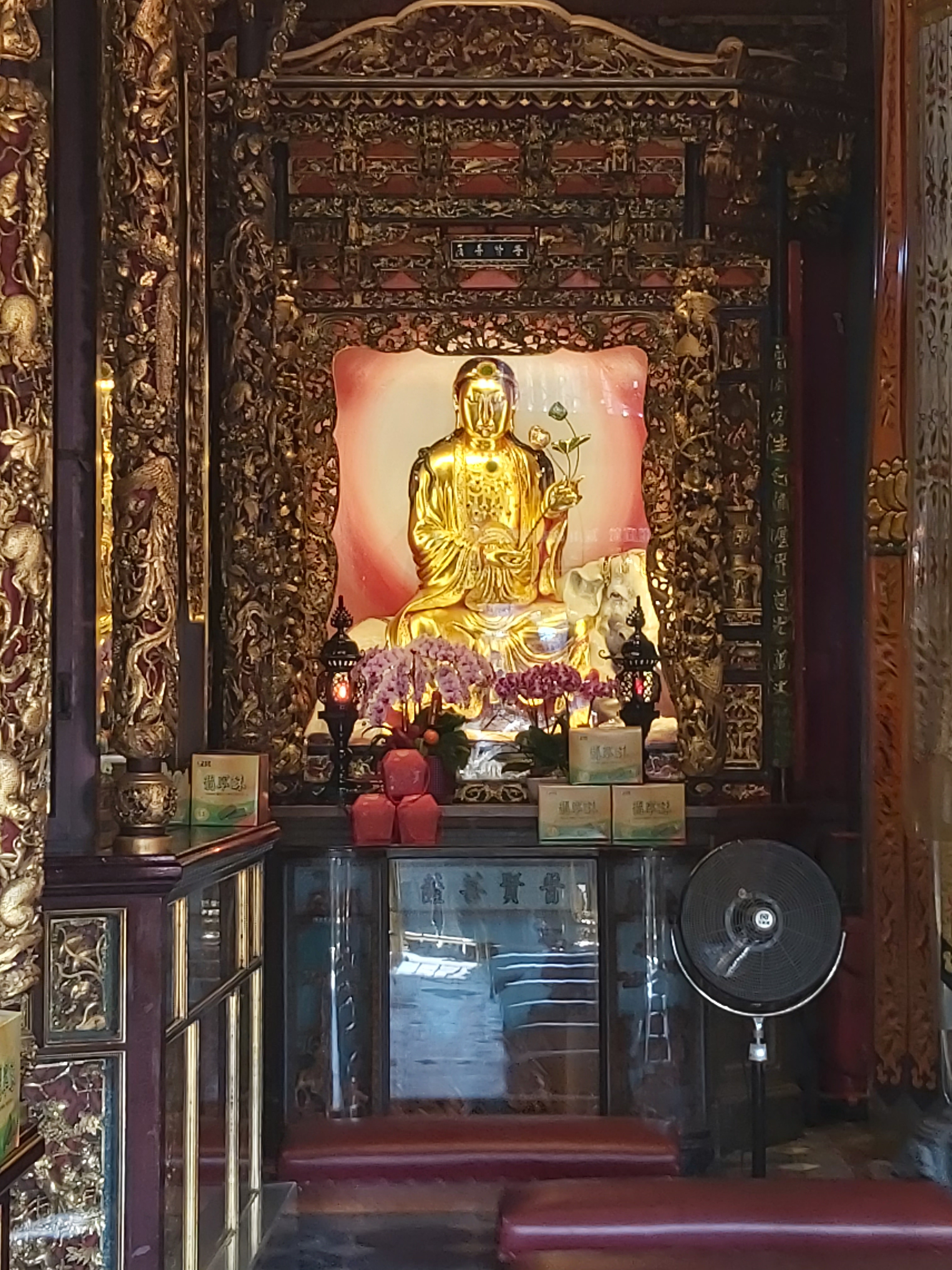
Statue of Puxian at Bangka Lungshan Temple in Taipei, Taiwan.

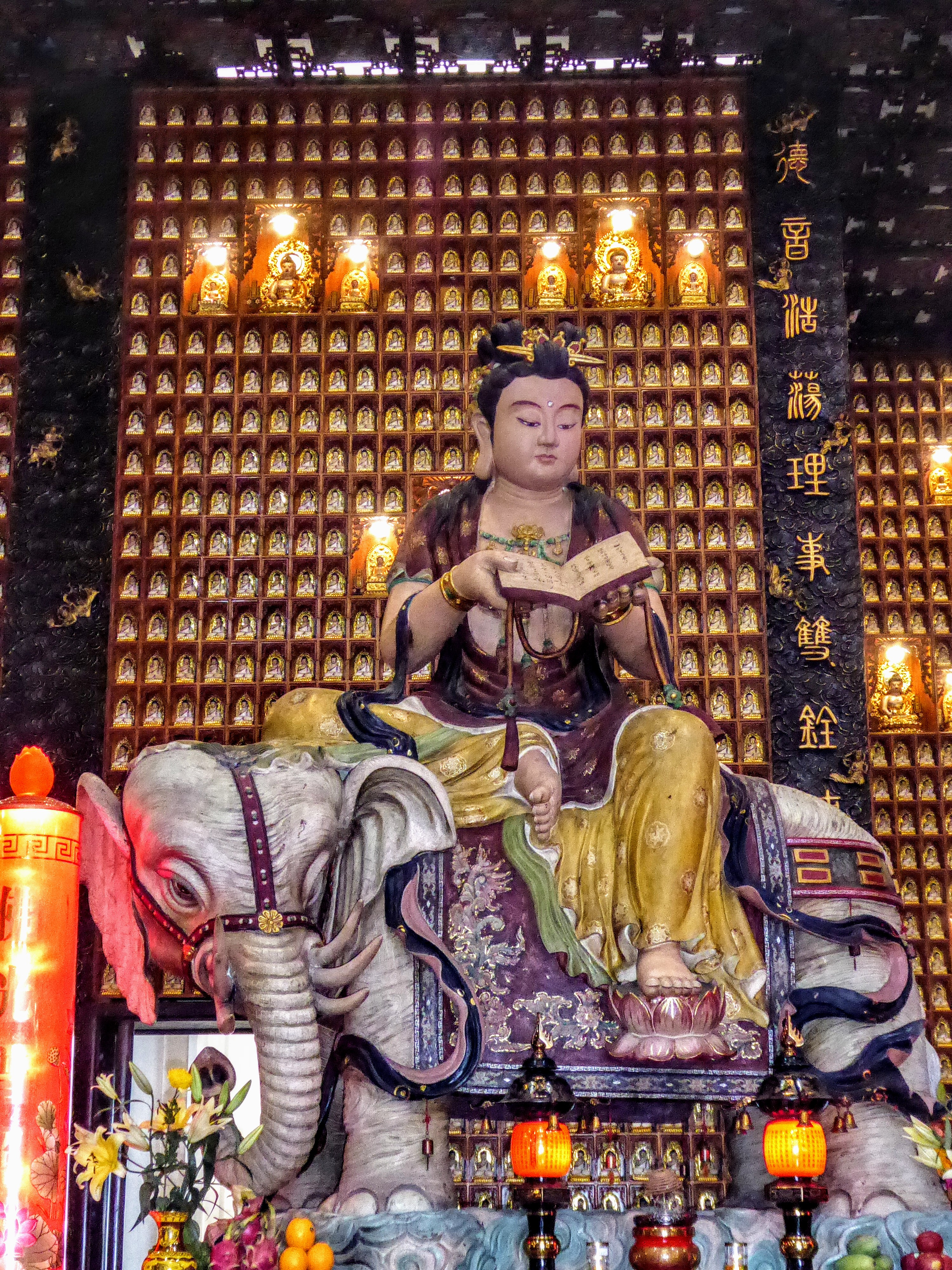
Statue of Pho Hien at Chua Van Phat in Ho Chi Minh City, Vietnam.

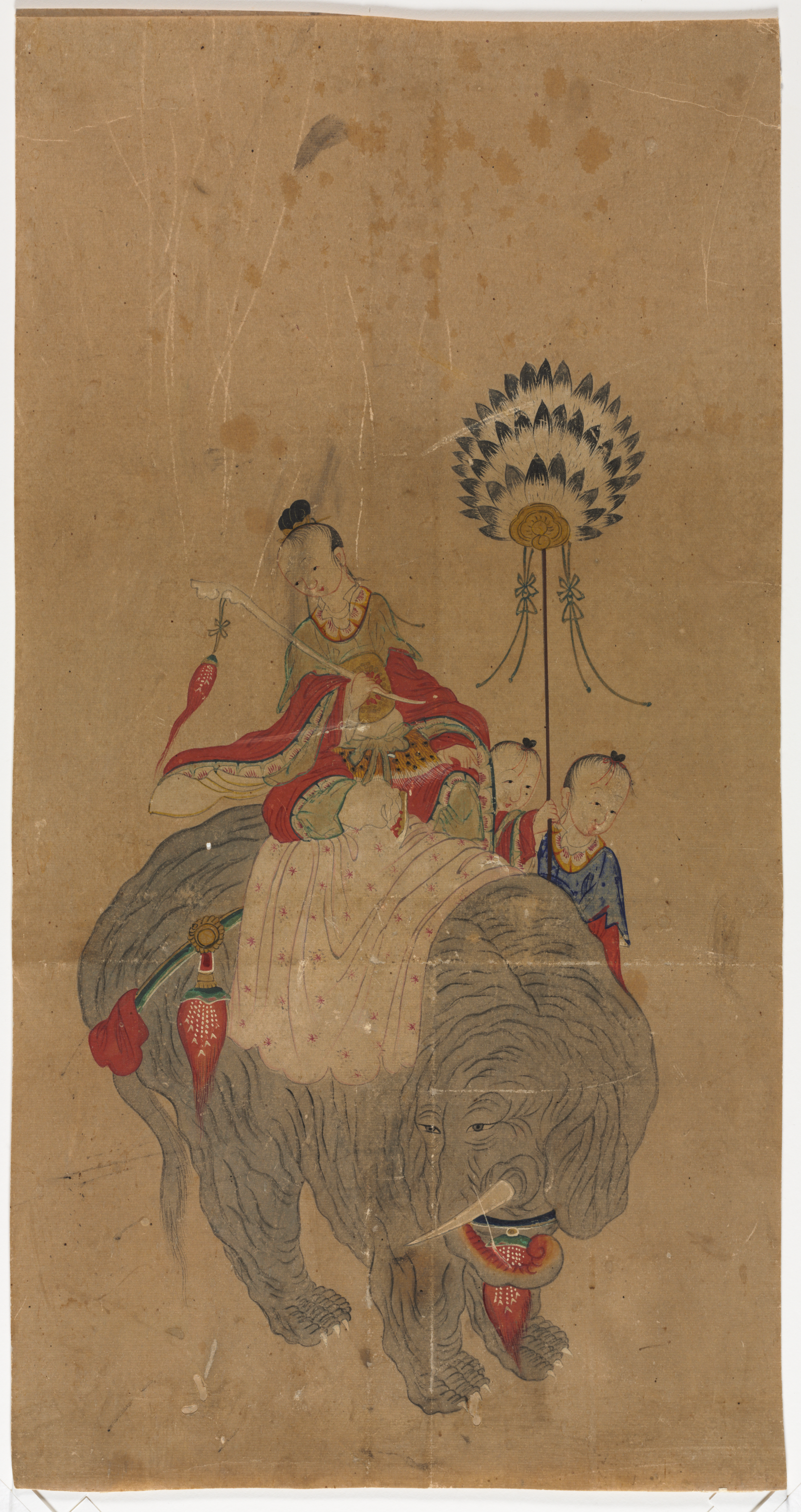
Joseon period (1392-1910) Korean painting of Bohyeon with two attendants. Held at the Cleveland Museum of Art.

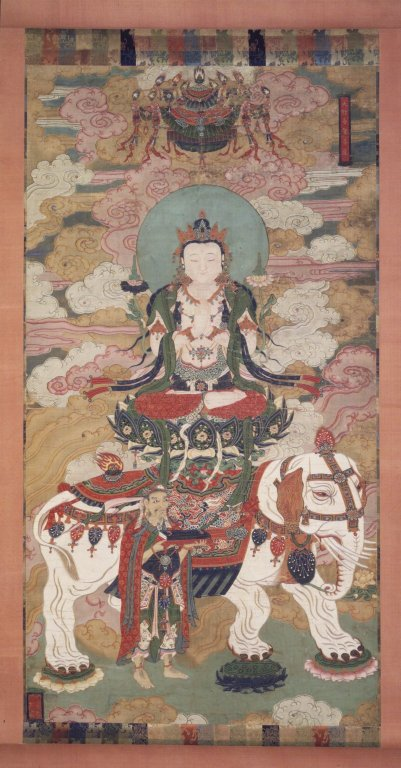
Korean painting of Bohyeon. Dated to between 1768 and 1833. Held at the Brooklyn Museum.

Heian period (794-1331) silk painting of Fugen, pictured in Bodhisattva of Universal Virtue who Prolongs Life, 12th-century.

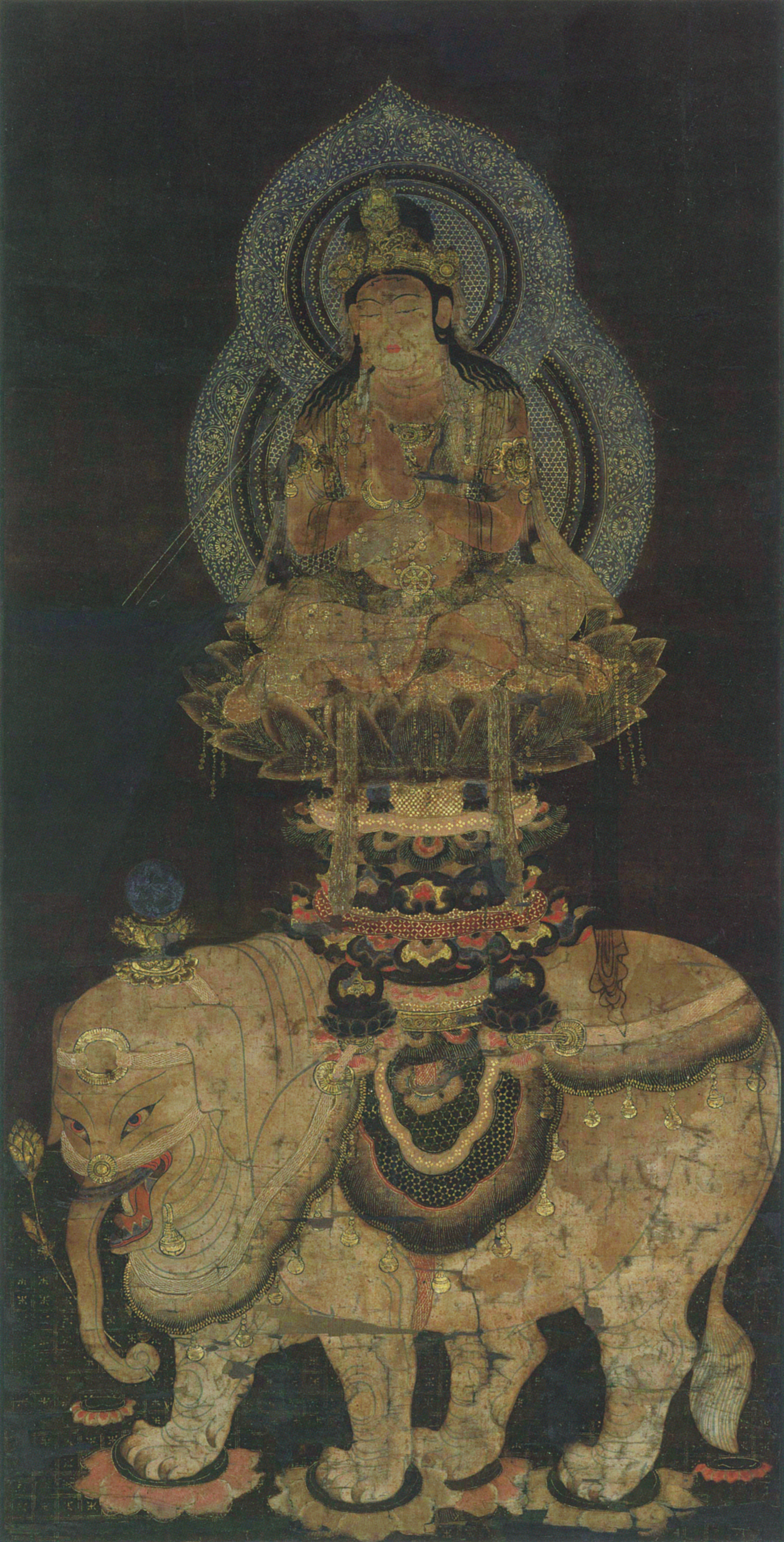
Heian period (794-1331) silk painting of Fugen from Bujō-ji in Tottori, Japan. 12th-century.

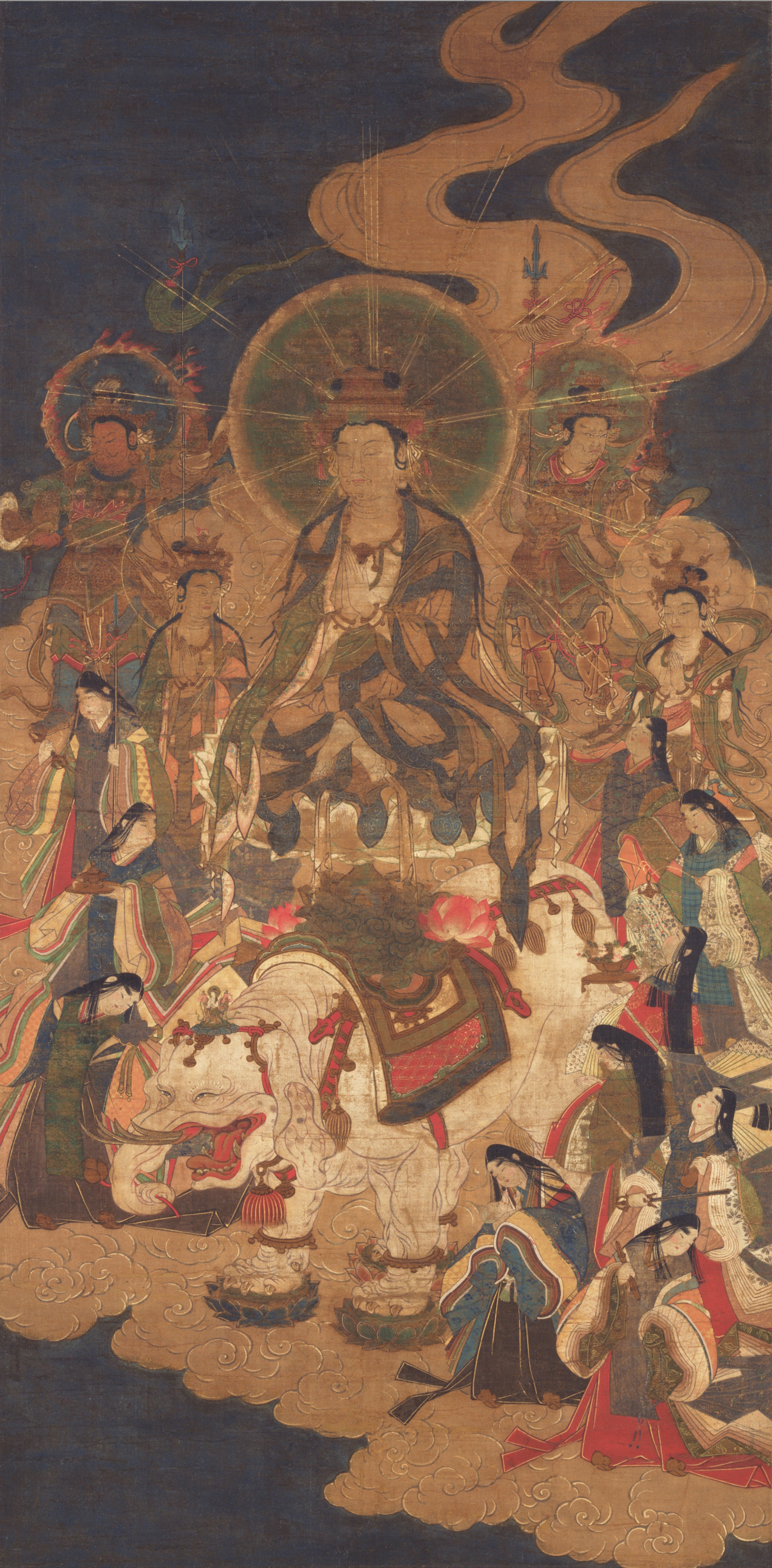
Kamakura period (1185-1333) painting of Fugen with the Ten Rākṣasīs. Held at the Nara National Museum in Nara, Japan.

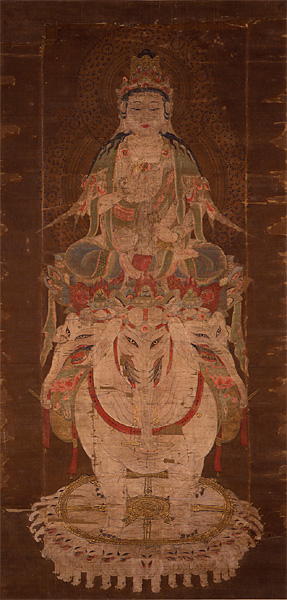
12th century silk painting of Enmei Fugen. Located at Matsunoo-dera in Maizuru, Kyoto, Japan.

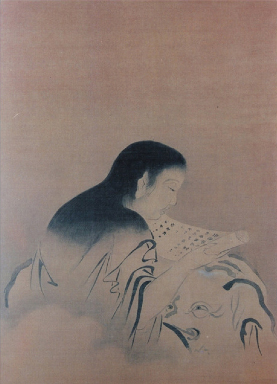
Edo period (1600-1868) painting of Fugen by Kano Tan'yū.

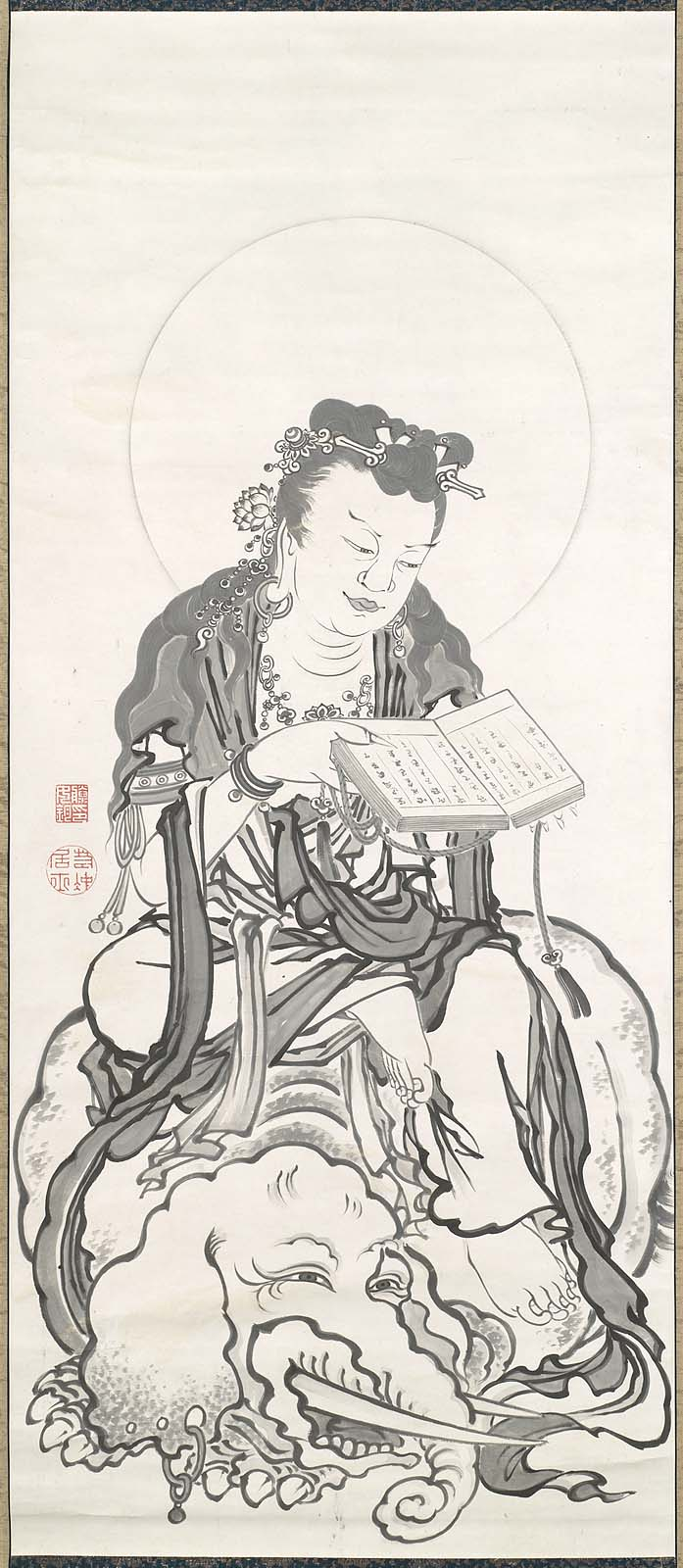
Edo period (1600-1868) painting of Fugen by Itō Jakuchū. Latter half of 18th century.

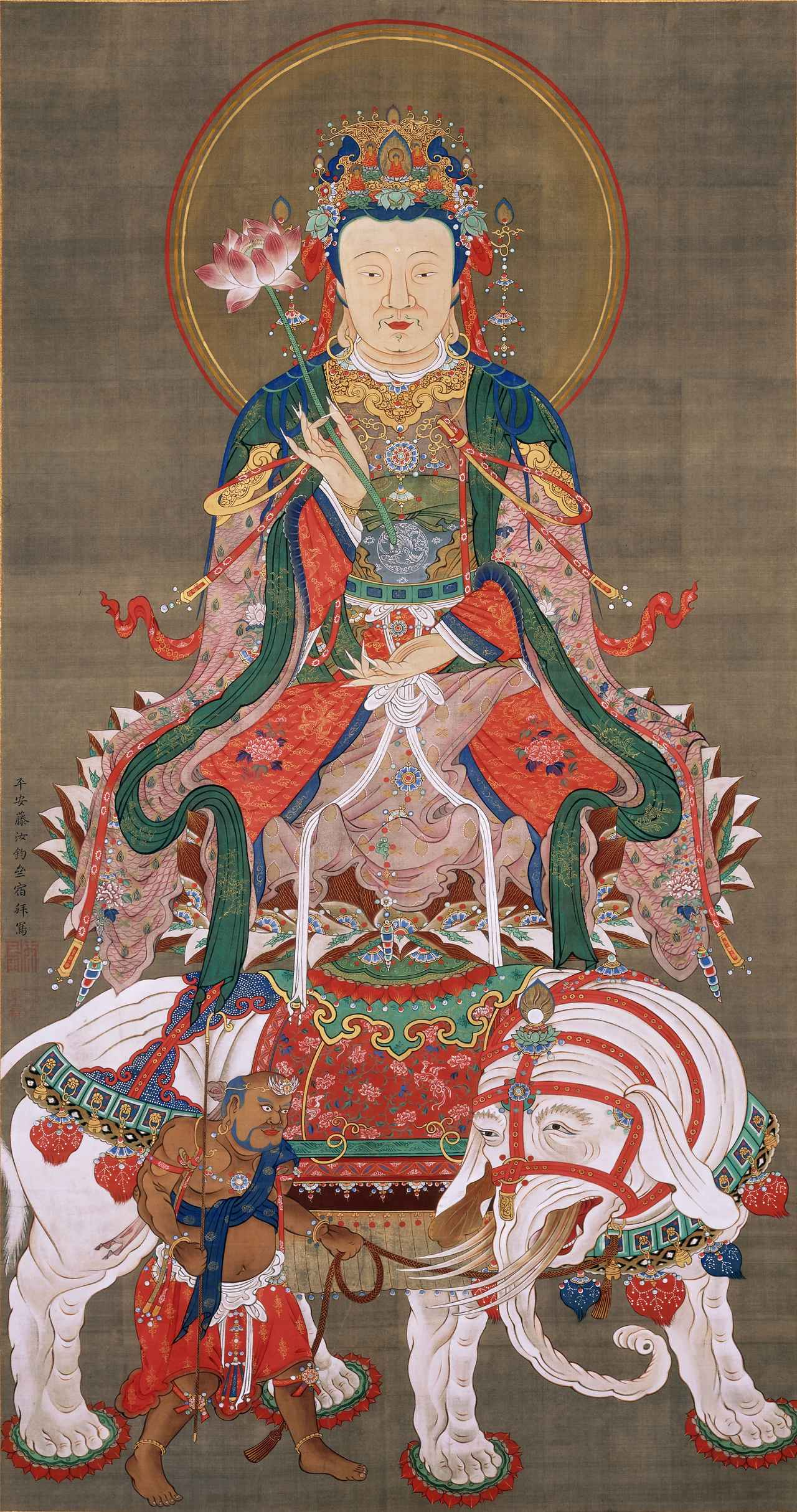
Edo period (1600-1868) painting of Fugen by Itō Jakuchū. From Shōkoku-ji in Kyoto, Japan.

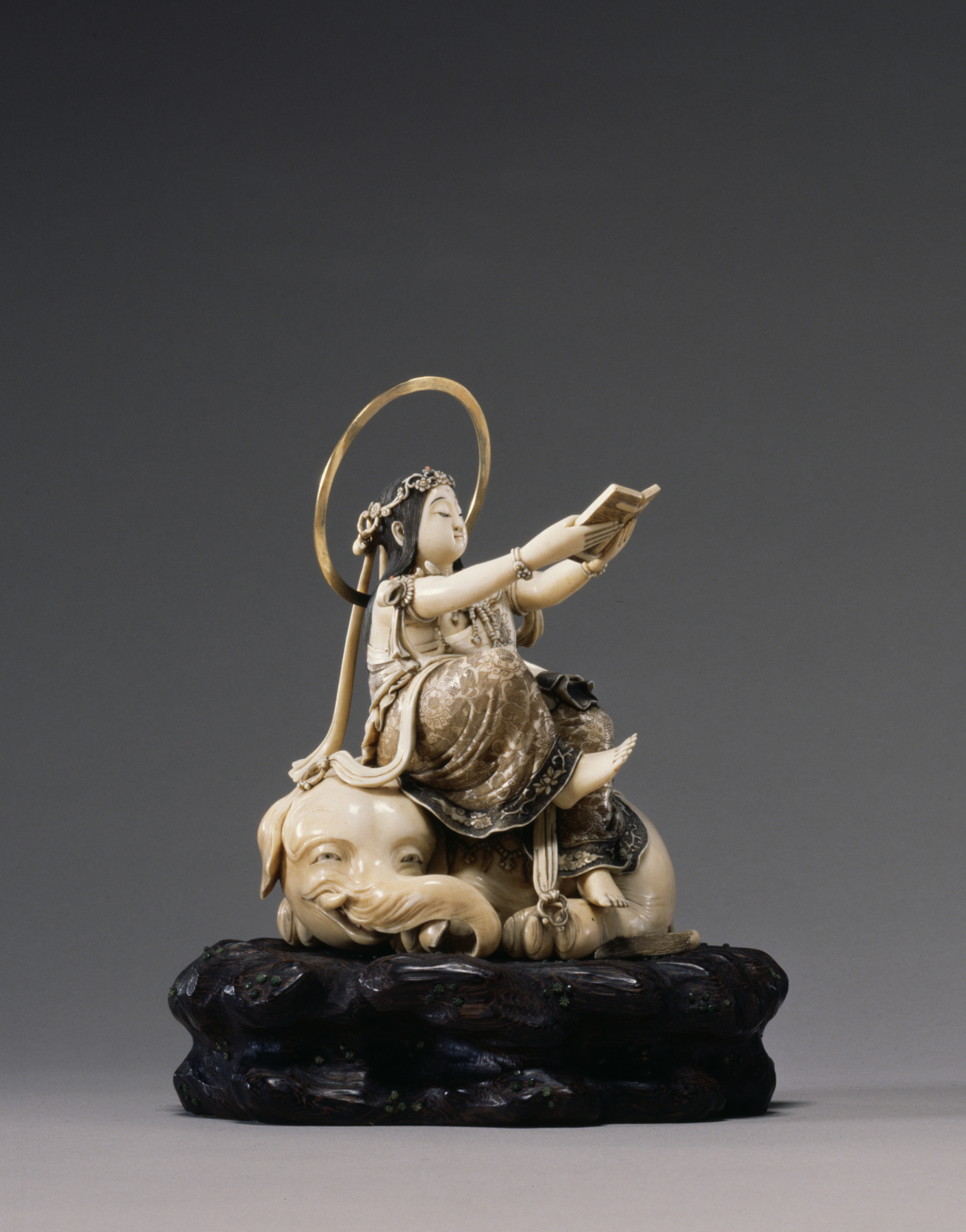
Meiji period (1868-1912) ivory carving of seated Bodhisattva Fugen with book by Shimamura Shunmei. Made between 1853 and 1896.

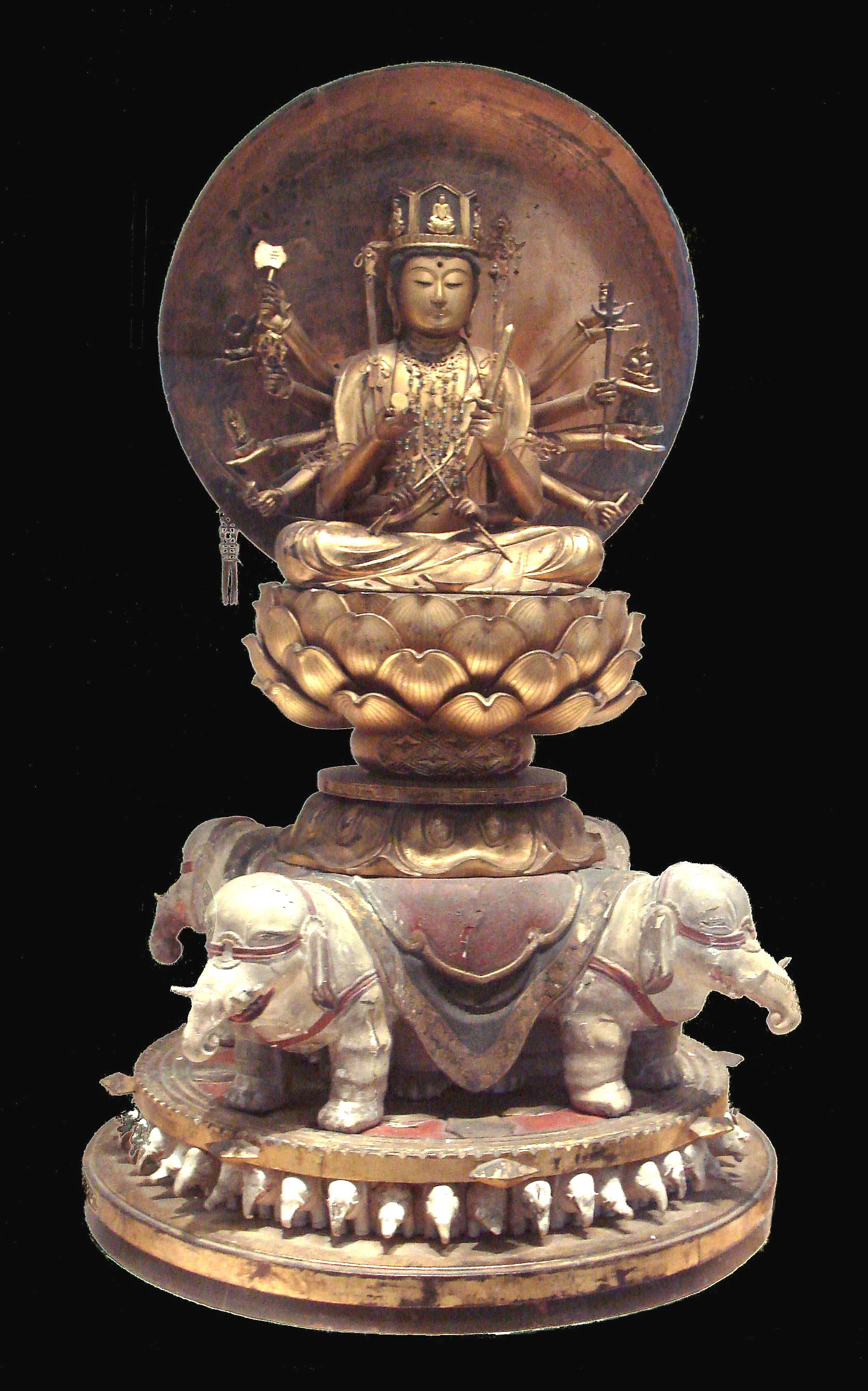
Fugen Enmei (普賢延命菩薩), the Life Preserver. Japan.

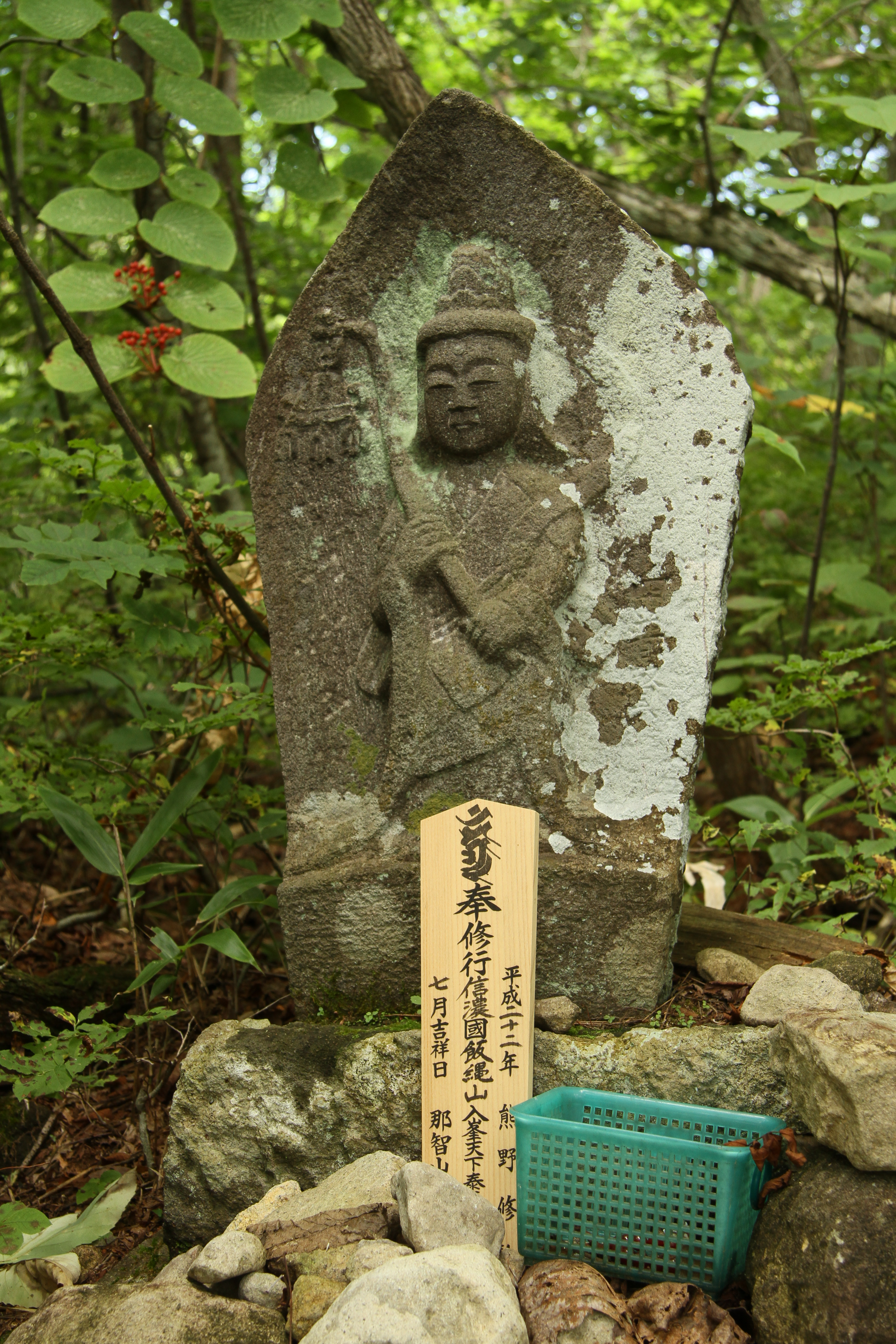
Statue of Fugen, one out of a set depicting Thirteen Buddhas, at Mount Iizuna in Nagano, Japan.

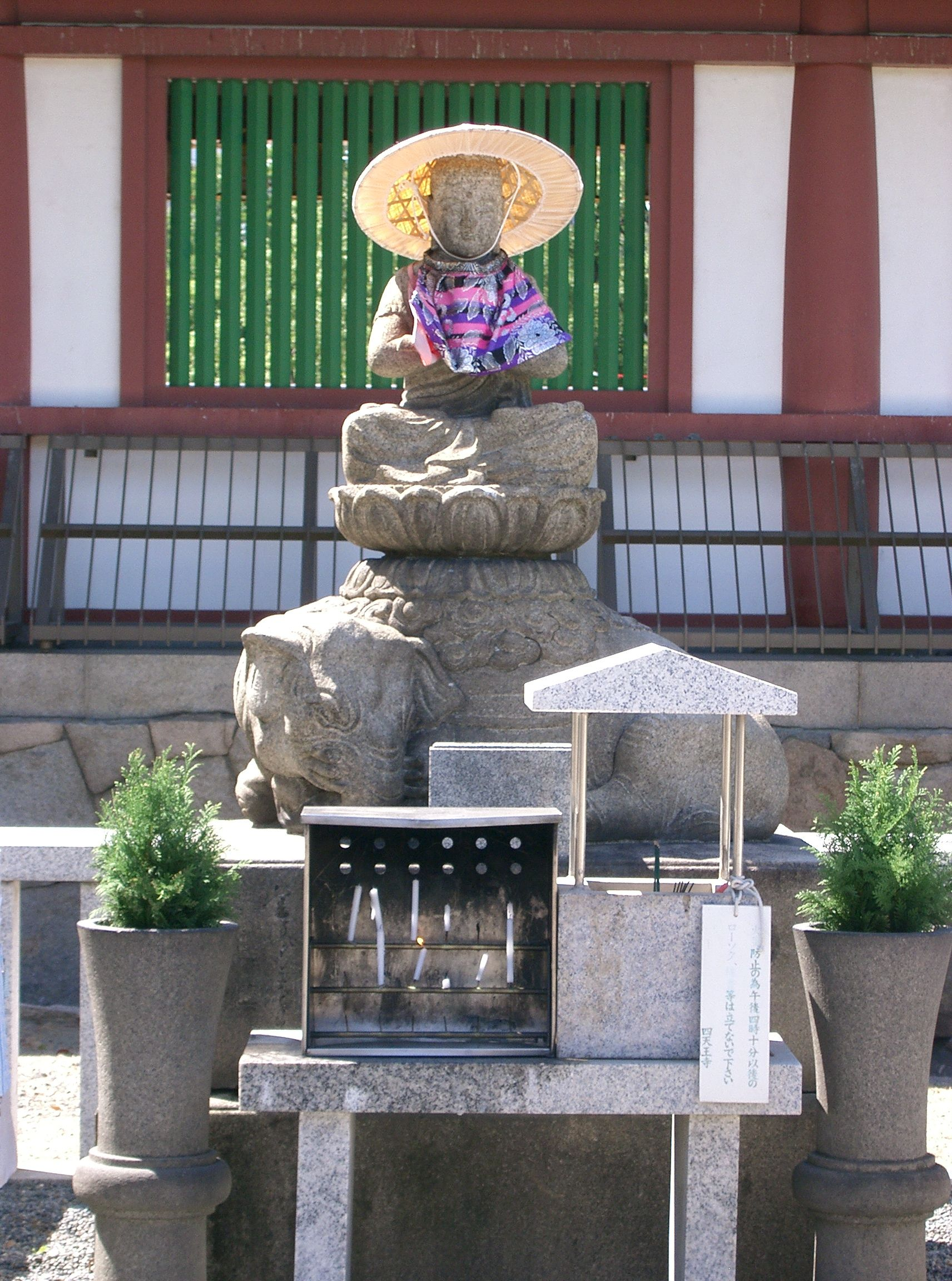
Statue of Fugen at Shitennō-ji in Osaka, Japan.

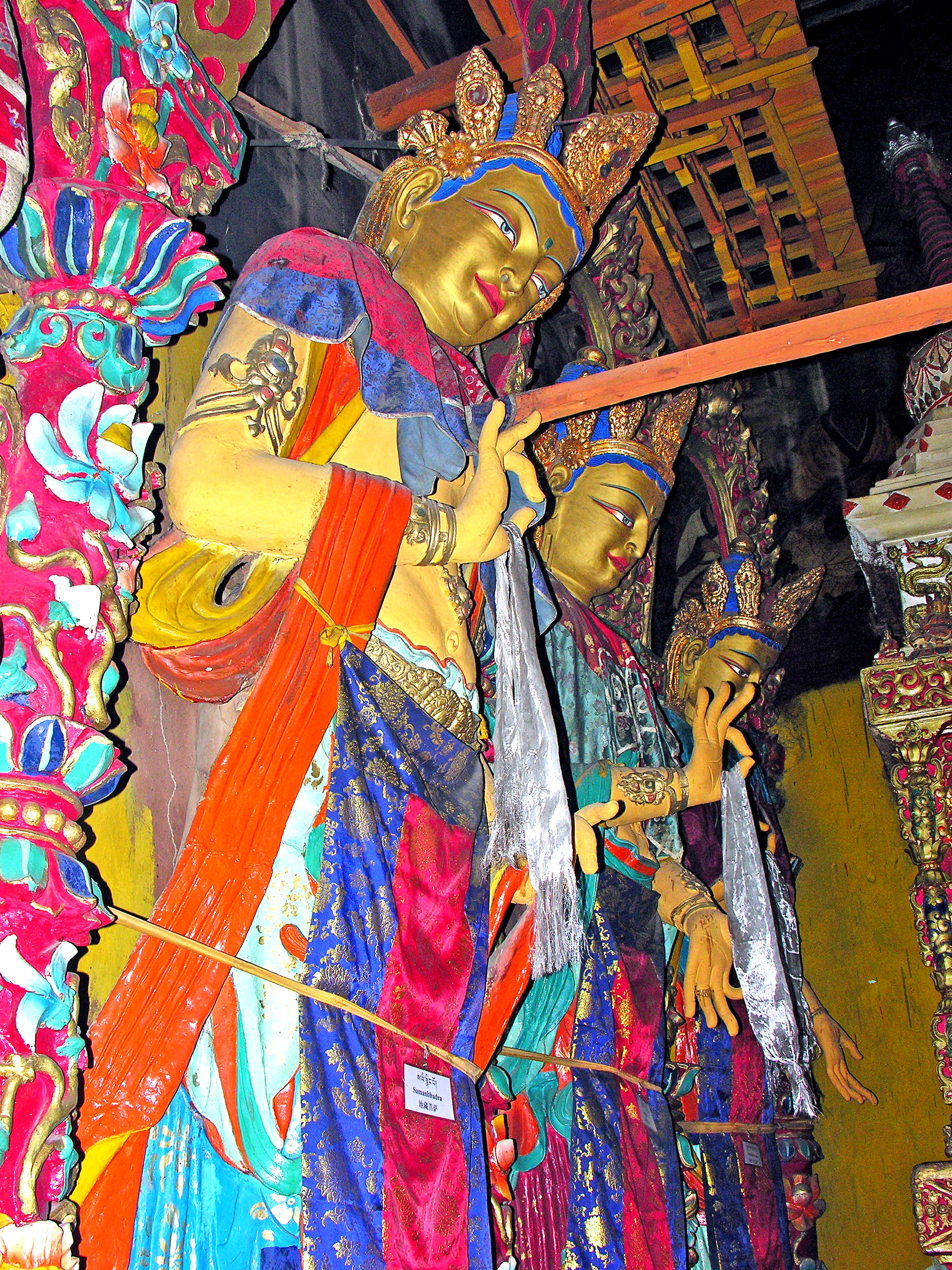
Samanbhadra at the Depung Monastery in Lhasa, Tibet.

== References and further reading ==
- Yeshe De Project (1986). Ancient Tibet: Research materials from the Yeshe De Project. California: Dharma Publishing. ISBN 0-89800-146-3.
- Dudjom Rinpoche; Jikdrel Yeshe Dorje (1991). Translated and edited by Gyurme Dorje with Matthew Kapstein (ed.). The Nyingma School of Tibetan Buddhism: its Fundamentals and History. Vol. Two Volumes. Boston: Wisdom Publications. ISBN 0-86171-087-8.
