= Guiling Shengmu =

Character from Investiture of the Gods

Relief of Guiling Shengmu at Ping Sien Si Temple, Malaysia.

Guiling Shengmu (simplified Chinese: 龟灵圣母; traditional Chinese: 龜靈聖母; pinyin: Guīlíng Shèngmǔ; lit. 'Holy Mother of the Spirit Turtle') is a character in the Chinese Ming dynasty novel Investiture of the Gods (Fengshen Yanyi). She is a disciple of Tongtian Jiaozhu, the leader of the Jie Sect (截教), and one of his four senior disciples. Her original form is a large female turtle.

== In Fengshen Yanyi ==
Guiling Shengmu is one of the four senior disciples of Tongtian Jiaozhu, along with Duobao Daoist, Jinling Shengmu, and Wudang Shengmu. After Huo Ling Shengmu is killed by Guangchengzi, Guiling Shengmu attacks him. Guangchengzi uses the Heaven-Flipping Seal (番天印), forcing her to reveal her original form as a large turtle. Tongtian Jiaozhu then expels her from Biyou Palace and forbids her from attending his lectures. The novel also says that she was originally a female turtle who attained the Dao around the time Cangjie created writing.

Guiling Shengmu later joins Tongtian Jiaozhu in the Ten Thousand Immortals Formation (萬仙陣). She fights Ju Liusun and drives him back with the Sun and Moon Pearl (日月珠). Ju Liusun flees westward, where Guiling Shengmu encounters Jieyin Daoist. Jieyin blocks the pearl with a lotus and strikes her with a rosary, forcing her back into turtle form.

Jieyin stops Ju Liusun from killing her and has the White Lotus Youth (白蓮童子) capture her. The youth releases mosquitoes from a bundle, and they drain Guiling Shengmu's body, leaving only her turtle shell. The mosquitoes then fly west, and one of them eats three of the twelve grades of Jieyin's lotus platform. Later interpretations identify these mosquitoes with Wen Daoren (蚊道人; the mosquitoe immortal). The name Wen Daoren, however, does not appear in the original novel's account of Guiling Shengmu's death.

Guiling Shengmu is not included among the deities given titles by Jiang Ziya in the final investiture.

== Later literature ==
Guiling Shengmu appears in Xiao Fengshen (小封神), a Taiwanese novel written by Xu Bingding and first published in a newspaper between 1931 and 1932. Xu used characters from Investiture of the Gods and placed them in stories set in the temples of Tainan.

In the novel, Guiling Shengmu is the master of Furong Cave (芙蓉洞). She tries to save Kui Xing after the Little Supreme God has captured him. The god sends Leizhenzi to fight her, and she is wounded. She later kills herself at Guoxing Harbor (國姓港) in Anping.

Xu also used a story about a stone turtle at Nanchang Bao'an Temple (南廠保安宮) in Tainan. In his novel, the stone turtle is the body of Guiling Shengmu, which turned to stone after her death.

== Worship ==
Guiling Shengmu was worshipped at a temple in Gegu (葛沽), Tianjin, during the Qing dynasty and the Republican period. The temple worshipped 13 female deities, including Guiling Shengmu, the Three Xiao Goddesses and other goddesses. The temple was demolished in the 1960s.

In Tainan, a stone bixi at Nanchang Bao'an Temple is worshipped as Bailian Shengmu (白蓮聖母). According to local accounts, the stone turtle fell into the sea while being taken to Tainan during the Qing period. Fishermen recovered it in 1911, and local people later worshipped it at the temple. Xu Bingding used this story when writing about Guiling Shengmu in Xiao Fengshen.
