= Golden-Haired Hou =

Chinese mythological figure

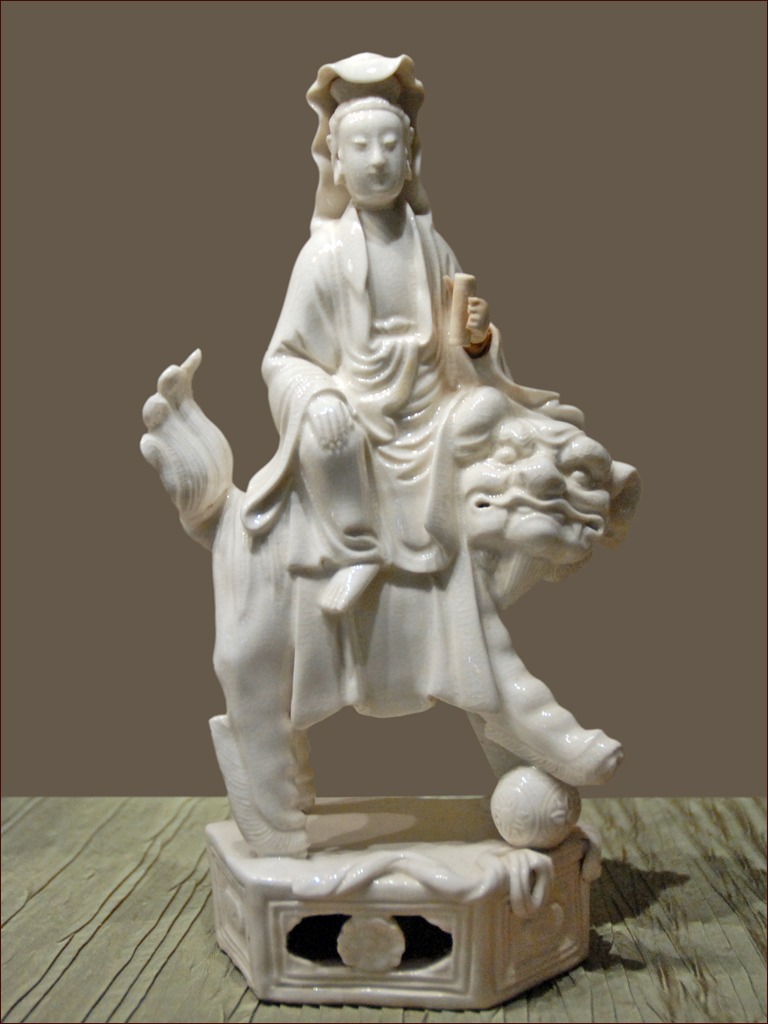
Guanyin rides on the Golden-Haired Hou.

The Golden-Haired Hou (Chinese: 金毛犼), is a mythical creature featured in Chinese mythology and legends. According to legends and literary works, the Golden-Haired Hou serves as the mount of the bodhisattva Guanyin.

== Legend ==
Another folk belief identifies the Golden-Haired Hou (金毛犼) as a type of jiangshi (僵屍, "hopping vampire" or reanimated corpse) rather than a divine creature. According to this belief, a jiangshi first has white hair, which turns black after about 500 years. After another 500 years, its hair turns golden, and it becomes a Golden-Haired Hou.

Some legends describe the Hou as dog-like and as an enemy of dragons that feeds on their brains. Other accounts describe it as resembling a qilin (麒麟), an auspicious creature in Chinese mythology.

=== Journey to the West ===
In Journey to the West, the Golden-Haired Hou is the mount of Guanyin. He overhears that Mahamayuri has cursed a prince of the Kingdom of Purpuria (朱紫國) after the prince accidentally killed two of her followers while hunting. As punishment, the prince is made to suffer from lovesickness for three years.

Years later, after the prince became king, the Golden-Haired Hou escaped while his caretaker was asleep and went to the mortal realm. He became the demon Sai Taisui (賽太歲) and lived at Xiezhi Cave on Unicorn Mountain (麒麟山獬豸洞), where he commanded a group of demons. He abducted the Golden Sage Queen (金聖皇后), one of the king's consorts, and forced her to live with him. The king became ill after her disappearance. The queen wore a magical robe given to her by a deity, which protected her from Sai Taisui, so he demanded palace maids from the kingdom instead.

Sai Taisui possessed the Purple Gold Bell (紫金鈴), a treasure made by Taishang Laojun. The bell had three chimes: the first produced fire, the second produced smoke, and the third produced yellow sand, each extending 300 zhang. Sai Taisui fought Sun Wukong several times. In their final battle, Sun Wukong took the bell from him. Guanyin then subdued Sai Taisui and used the Tight-Fillet Spell (緊箍咒) to make Sun Wukong return the bell after he tried to keep it.

=== Investiture of the Gods ===
In Investiture of the Gods (Fengshen Yanyi), the Golden-Haired Hou appears as Jinguang Xian (金光仙, "Immortal of Golden Light"), a member of the Jie Sect (截教). A conflict between Huoling Shengmu (火靈聖母) and Guang Chengzi, along with the actions of Shen Gongbao, leads to conflict between the Jie Sect and the Chan Sect (闡教). During the Battle of the Ten Thousand Immortals Formation (萬仙陣), Jinguang Xian guards the "Four Symbols Formation" (四象陣) against the Chan Sect and the Zhou army. Cihang Zhenren (慈航道人), who is identified with the later Guanyin in the novel, defeats him and reveals his true form as the Golden-Haired Hou. Cihang Zhenren then takes the Golden-Haired Hou as his mount.
