= Wudang Shengmu =

Character in Investiture of the Gods

Wudang Shengmu (simplified Chinese: 无当圣母; traditional Chinese: 無當聖母; pinyin: Wúdāng Shèngmǔ, also written in Chinese as 武當聖母), is a character in the Chinese Ming dynasty novel Investiture of the Gods (Fengshen Yanyi). She is one of the four senior disciples of Tongtian Jiaozhu, the leader of the Jie Sect (截教). The other three are Duobao Daoren, Jinling Shengmu and Guiling Shengmu.

== Role in the novel ==
Wudang Shengmu is among the disciples who welcome Tongtian Jiaozhu when he arrives at the Immortal-Slaying Array (誅仙陣). She stands with Duobao Daoren, Jinling Shengmu and Guiling Shengmu as her master prepares to fight the followers of Yuanshi Tianzun.

She later takes part in the battle of the Ten Thousand Immortals Array (萬仙陣), where the Jie Sect fights against the followers of Laozi, Yuanshi Tianzun, Jieyin Daoren and Zhunti Daoren. Wudang Shengmu fights alongside the other immortals of her sect. Jinling Shengmu is killed by Randeng Daoren, while many other immortals are killed or captured. When Wudang Shengmu sees that the array can no longer hold, she leaves the battlefield. The novel gives no further account of her fate.

== Other literature ==
In the Ming dynasty novel The Eunuch Sanbao's Journey to the Western Ocean (Sanbao Taijian Xiyang Ji), Lishan Laomu is called Zhishi Wudang Laomu (治世無當老母). She appears in a dispute with the Buddhist monk Jin Bifeng after he traps one of her disciples beneath a magical bowl.

In Xue Dingshan Zhengxi (薛丁山征西), Wudang Shengmu (武當聖母) and Lishan Laomu (黎山老母) appear as separate goddesses. Both take part in a battle against a formation of immortals, but they are given different tasks.

== Worship ==
Wudang Shengmu was worshipped at the Niangniang Temple in Gegu (葛沽), Tianjin, during the Qing dynasty and the Republican period. The temple had 13 goddesses in its main hall. Wudang Shengmu was placed on the left side with Guiling Shengmu, the Smallpox Goddess and the Child-Giving Goddess. The temple was demolished in the 1960s.
