= Ju Liusun =

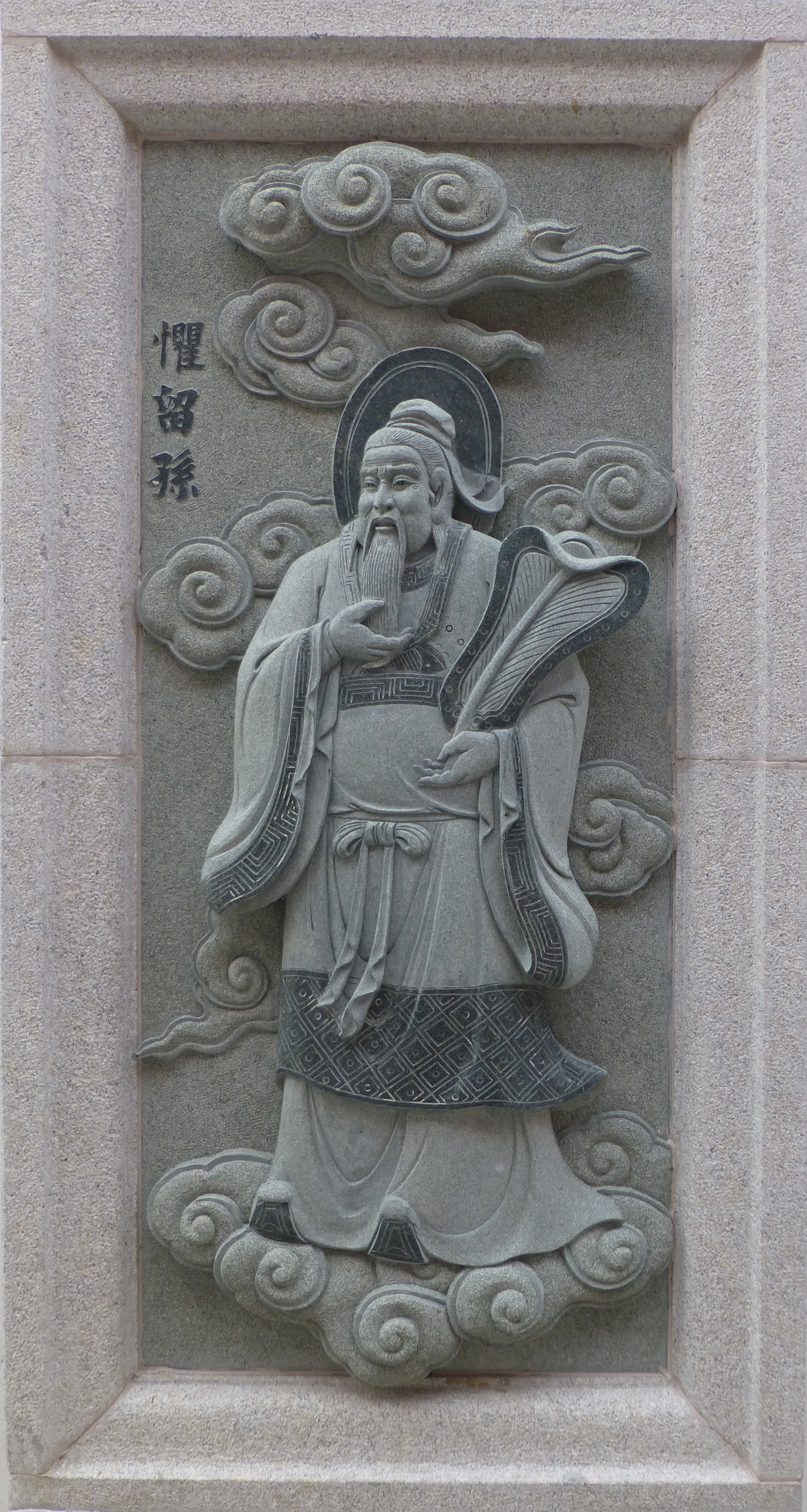
Relief of Ju Liusun

Ju Liusun (Chinese: 懼留孫; pinyin: Jù Liúsūn) is a Daoist immortal in the 16th-century Chinese novel Investiture of the Gods (Fengshen Yanyi). He is one of the Twelve Golden Immortals (十二金仙), disciples of Yuanshi Tianzun, and resides at Feiyun Cave on Jialong Mountain (夾龍山飛雲洞). Ju Liusun is the Daoist counterpart of the acient Buddha Krakucchanda (拘留孫佛).

== In Investiture of the Gods ==
Ju Liusun is one of the Twelve Golden Immortals of the Chan Sect. He helps Jiang Ziya and the Zhou army in their war against Shang. He owns the Immortal-Binding Rope (捆仙繩, Kunxian Sheng), a magical rope used to capture enemies. He uses it to defeat Zhao Jiang (趙江), the master of the Earth-Blazing Array (地烈陣).

His disciple Tu Xingsun (土行孫) can travel underground. After meeting Shen Gongbao, Tu is persuaded to leave his master and seek wealth and a high position in the human world. He steals Ju Liusun's Immortal-Binding Rope and joins the Shang army. With the rope, he captures several Zhou fighters, including Nezha and Huang Tianhua. When Ju Liusun learns what has happened, he comes down from Jialong Mountain to find his disciple. He stops Tu from escaping underground by making the earth as hard as iron, then ties him up with the rope.

Jiang Ziya wants Tu Xingsun put to death for trying to kill him and King Wu. Ju Liusun believes that his disciple can still be useful to Zhou. He also learns that Tu is meant to marry Deng Chanyu (鄧嬋玉), the daughter of the Shang general Deng Jiugong. Ju advises Jiang to arrange the marriage, hoping that it will bring Deng Jiugong over to the Zhou side. Tu Xingsun is spared and later fights for Zhou.

Ju Liusun is also caught in the Nine-Bend Yellow River Array (九曲黃河陣) by the Sanxiao Sisters. Like the other Chan Sect immortals trapped there, he loses his magical powers. He later fights Guiling Shengmu (龜靈聖母) during the battle of the Myriad Immortal Array (萬仙陣). She attacks him with her Sun and Moon Pearl, forcing him to retreat. Jieyin Daoren (接引道人), a leader of the Western Sect, comes to his aid. Ju Liusun then returns with him to the battlefield.

The novel says that Ju Liusun will later enter Buddhism and spread its teachings. He is identified with Krakucchanda Buddha (拘留孫佛), one of the ancient Buddhas in Buddhist tradition. Other Chan Sect immortals also become Buddhist figures, including Cihang Daoren as Guanyin, Wenshu Guangfa Tianzun as Manjushri, and Puxian Zhenren as Samantabhadra.

== Interpretations ==
Writer Huang Jiang reads Ju Liusun as a "boundary-crossing" figure (越界). He writes that the character was based on Krakucchanda Buddha (拘留孫佛), the fourth of the Seven Buddhas of the Past. In Fengshen Yanyi, however, Ju Liusun first appears as a Daoist immortal. Huang says this creates a crossing between Buddhist and Daoist traditions, and he notes that Ju Liusun later goes west and becomes a Buddhist figure.
