= Ma Yuan (deity) =

Character in the Chinese novel Fengshen Yanyi

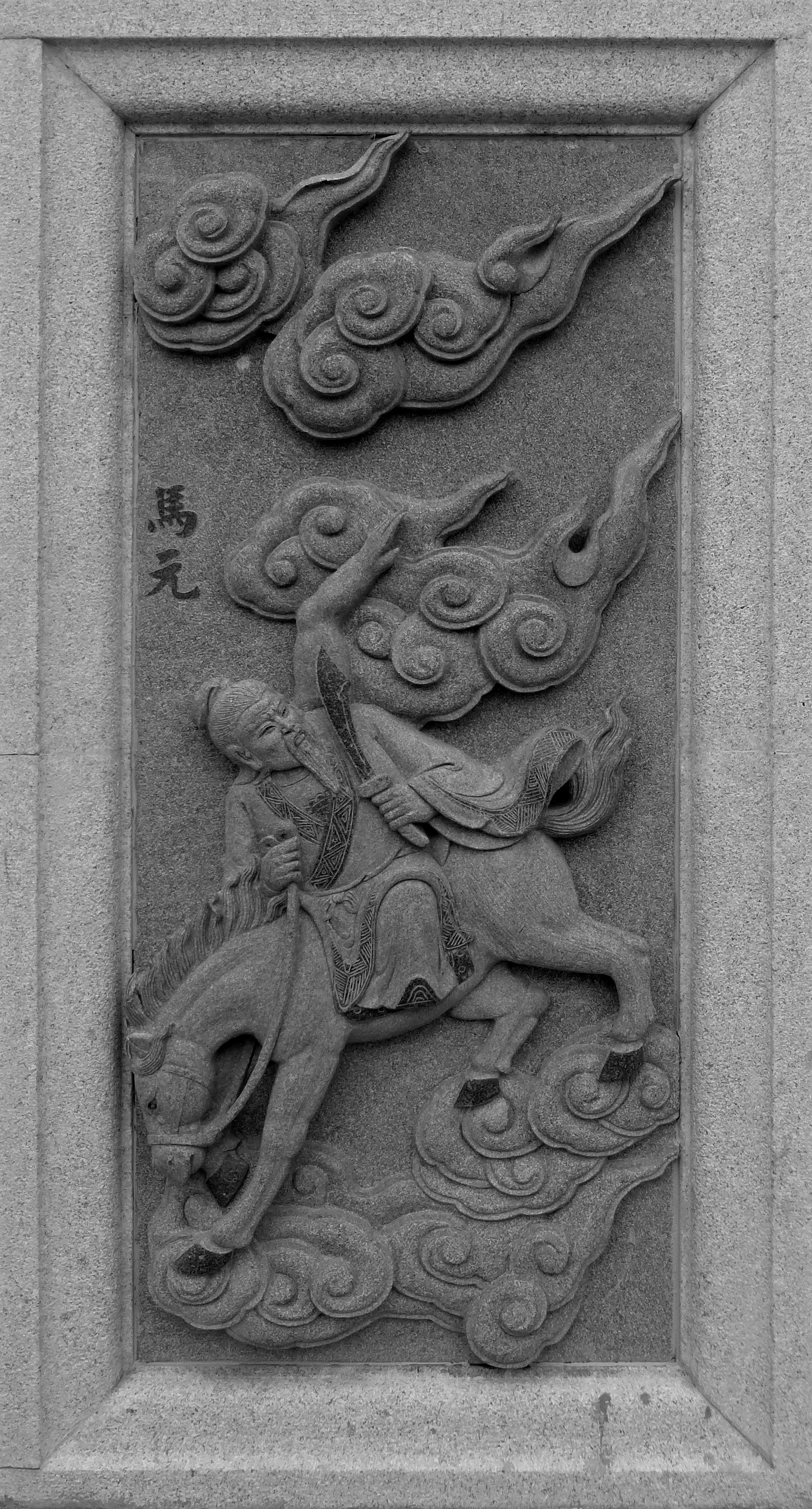
Ma Yuan at Ping Sien Si Temple

Ma Yuan (Chinese: 馬元; pinyin: Mǎ Yuán), also called Yiqi Xian (一氣仙), is a character in the Chinese novel Fengshen Yanyi. He lives in White Bone Cave (白骨洞) on Skull Mountain (骷髏山) and fights for the Jie Sect (截教). He is known for eating human hearts. He is later taken to the West by Zhunti Daoren.

== Role in the novel ==
Ma Yuan is invited by Shen Gongbao to help Yin Hong fight against the Zhou army. He has sharp teeth, wears a necklace made of human skulls, and has flames coming from his eyes, ears, and nose. He can also make a large hand appear behind his neck.

During a battle, Ma Yuan kills Wu Rong (武榮) and eats his heart. He later attacks Yang Jian, but Yang Jian survives by using his magical powers. Ma Yuan also fights Tuxingsun and Jiang Ziya.

Wenshu Guangfa Tianzun later tricks and captures Ma Yuan. Before Wenshu can kill him, Zhunti Daoren arrives and asks to spare his life. Zhunti says that Ma Yuan is not named on the List of Gods and is destined to follow the Western Sect. Wenshu agrees, and Zhunti takes Ma Yuan to the West.

The novel says that Ma Yuan later becomes a Buddha, but does not give him a Buddhist title. Some later accounts call him Ma Yuan Zunwang Fo (马元尊王佛, "Ma Yuan Honored King Buddha").

== Interpretations ==
Yamashita Kazuo discusses Ma Yuan's rescue as part of the novel's portrayal of the Western Sect. Zhunti Daoren saves Ma Yuan because he is not on the List of Gods and has a connection with the West. Yamashita notes that Zhunti also helps other figures in the novel who are destined for the Western Sect.

Hu Wenhui has suggested that the conflict between the Chan and Jie sects reflects disputes between the Quanzhen and Zhengyi schools of Daoism. Ma Yuan's cruelty may have been used to mock the Zhengyi tradition.
