= Ma Yuan =

Ma Yuan may refer to:

- Ma Yuan (Han dynasty) (馬援; 14 BC – 49 AD), general of the Han dynasty
- Ma Yuan (painter) (馬遠; c. 1160–1225), painter of the Song dynasty
- Ma Yuan (judge) (馬原; born 1930), a former Vice President of the Supreme People's Court of China
- Ma Yuan (deity) (馬元), Investiture of the Gods character
