= Heavenly Peach Garden =

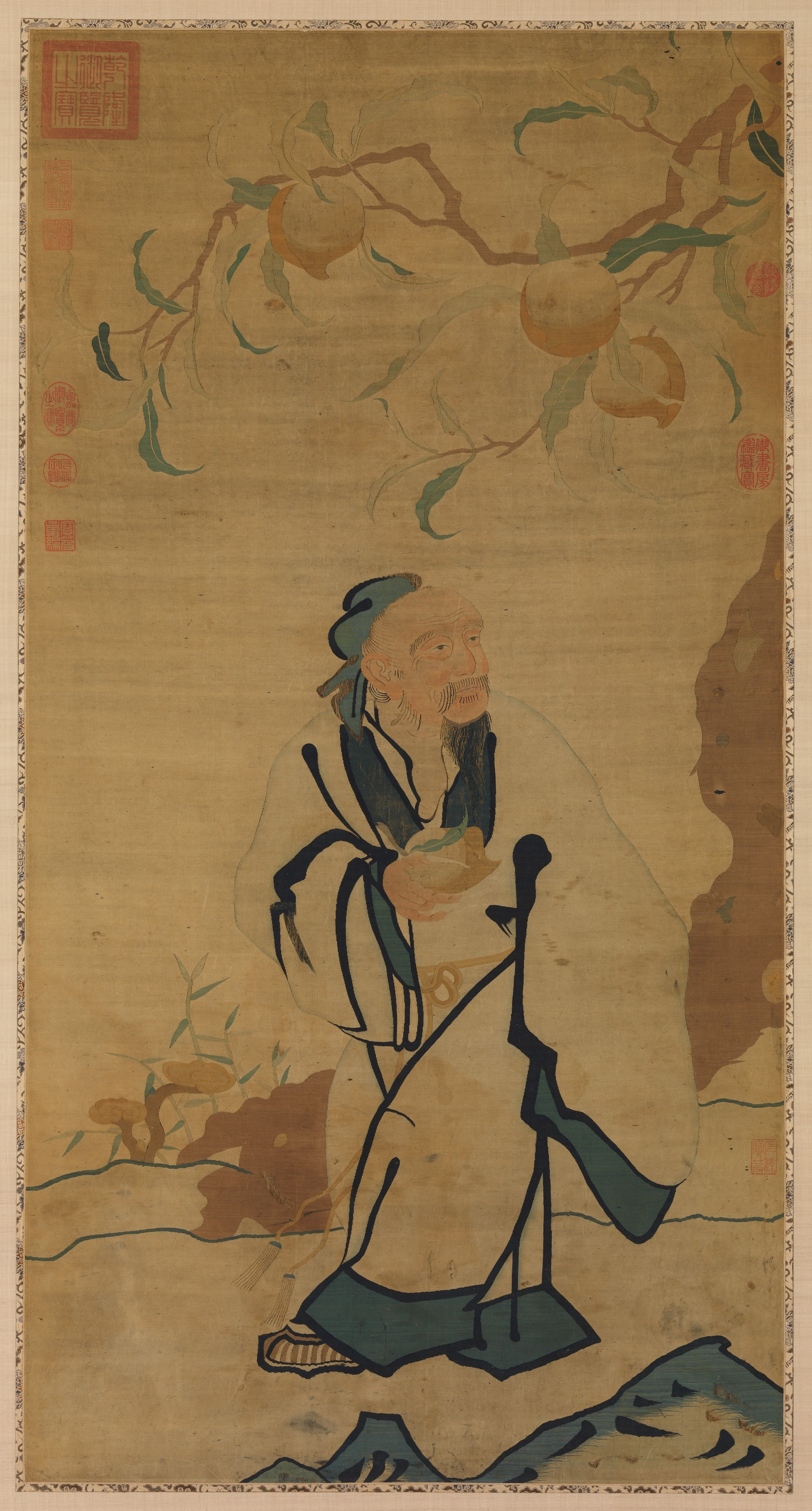
Silk tapestry of Dongfang Shuo stealing a peach from Heavenly Peach Garden, Ming dynasty (Metropolitan Museum of Art)

The Heavenly Peach Garden (蟠桃园) is a mythical location in Chinese mythology and Taoist lore, most famously depicted in the 16th-century classic novel Journey to the West. Situated in Heaven or on Mount Kunlun, the garden is owned by the Queen Mother of the West and contains 3,600 magical peach trees that grant different levels of immortality and spiritual enlightenment to those who consume their fruit.

The Queen Mother hosts an annual "Peach Banquet" (蟠桃盛会) to celebrate and share Peaches of Immortality from this garden.

== Description ==
According to Chinese folklore, the Peach Garden is located in Heaven or, in some versions, on Mount Kunlun. The garden is said to be guarded by Tudigong and many heavenly servants responsible for tending the trees, carrying water, pruning the peaches, and cleaning the garden. The heavenly Peach Garden contains three guarded groups of 1,200 trees. Peaches from the front of the garden ripen every 3,000 years and grant enlightenment and immortality. Peaches from the middle of the garden ripen every 6,000 years and grant eternal youth and the ability to fly among the clouds. Peaches from the back of the garden are the most powerful, ripening every 9,000 years and granting a lifespan equal to Heaven and Earth, lasting as long as the sun and moon.

== Literary and myth ==
In early Chinese mythology, the Queen Mother's immortal peach garden was located on Earth, especially on Mount Kunlun, instead of the heavens. Mount Kunlun was seen as a sacred mountain connecting the human and divine worlds, so the Peach Garden became similar to the "Tree of Life" in Chinese mythology. Scholars believe the immortal peach tree developed from older myths about the "Undying Tree" (不死树) and "Sweet Wood" (甘木), which were recorded in ancient texts such as the Classic of Mountains and Seas and the Huainanzi. In older texts before the Jin dynasty, including the Han Wu Di Nei Zhuan (汉武帝内传), the Queen Mother of the West was still described as living on Earth and growing her peaches at the Kunlun Peach Garden.

As Chinese cosmology evolved, many gods and sacred places were moved from earthly mountains into the heavens. Because of this, the Kunlun Peach Garden was gradually turned into a heavenly garden in later stories. In the Song dynasty text Poetic Tale of Tripitaka of the Great Tang Fetching Scriptures, an early literary prototype of the Monkey King, known as the "Monkey Pilgrim" (Hou Xingzhe), encounters the Queen Mother's earthly pool. In this tale, falling peaches magically transform into children aged up to 7,000 years old. Literary scholars note that centuries later, when the definitive Ming dynasty novel Journey to the West was written, this singular earthly legend had split into two distinct narratives: one branch was elevated into the celestial court to become the "Heavenly Peach Garden", while the other remained on Earth, evolving into the legend of the immortal Ginseng Fruit (人参果) tree owned by Zhenyuan Daxian.

In Journey to the West, the heavenly Peach Garden became the starting point of Sun Wukong’s rebellion against Heaven. After being appointed guardian of the garden by the Jade Emperor, Sun Wukong secretly entered the back of the orchard and ate the rare 9,000-year peaches while using magic to make the caretakers sleep. Later, the Seven Fairies discovered that many of the best peaches prepared for the Pan-Tao Feast had already been eaten, leading to the events that sparked Sun Wukong’s war against Heaven.

In one local version, the Peach Garden was originally managed by Taishang Laojun. After he resigned, the Jade Emperor ordered Li Jing, the Pagoda-Bearing Heavenly King, to find a new guardian within five days. Different gods then recommended their own relatives for the position. Lord Thunder God (雷神侯), the Jade Emperor's brother-in-law, nominated Zhu Bajie, while the Queen Mother of the West nominated the Bull Demon King. Faced with favoritism, bribery, and political pressure, Li Jing struggled to choose a replacement and complained that managing heavenly appointments had become impossible.

According to a folk legend recorded in Legends of the Queen Mother of the West, Princess Longji, the youngest daughter of the Queen Mother of the West, was exiled to the celestial Peach Garden. A mouse spirit once stole her immortal peach from the garden, and later she caused the death of Nüwa's sacred white elephant. After this, the Queen Mother of the West punished Longji and sent her to work in the Peach Garden under supervision.

According to legend, Dongfang Shuo sneaked into the Peach Garden three times to steal the immortal peaches. As punishment, Queen Mother of the West sent him down to the mortal world. Because of this garden heist, Dongfang Shuo became worshiped as a deity of longevity in Chinese folklore.

== Places linked to the legend ==
In Jingchuan County, Gansu, local stories tell of the Queen Mother of the West and her Peach Feast. At the foot of Mount Wangmu is Yaochi Gully (瑶池沟), where a pool called Yaochi (瑶池), or the Jade Pool, is found. Local legend says that the Queen Mother held her Peach Feast there and invited the gods to eat her peaches.

Jingchuan also has a peach farm called the West Queen Mother Peach Garden (西王母蟠桃园). The farm covers 245 mu and grows several kinds of peaches. It is also a place for visitors to pick fruit and enjoy the countryside.

Mount Tai in Shandong is another place where people worship the Queen Mother of the West. At the foot of the mountain is Wangmu Pool (王母池), where a Peach Feast is held every year on the third day of the third lunar month. Peaches also have a long history in the area. The Bencao Gangmu by Li Shizhen quotes an older text, the Mingyi Bielu (名醫別錄), which says that peaches grew in the valleys of Mount Tai.

Literary scholar Du Guichen (杜貴晨) has argued that Mount Tai helped shape some of the places in Journey to the West. He points to places on the mountain, including Wangmu Pool and the Southern Heavenly Gate. He believes that these places helped the author describe Heaven, the human world and the Underworld.

== Interpretations ==
Anthropologist Zhou Xing compares the peaches of immortality with the "Tree of Life" (生命树) found in old myths. He describes the peaches as a kind of "Cosmic Medicine" (宇宙药) that could give people long life. In these myths, the garden is a place where people can escape death and live forever.

The garden and Sun Wukong's actions there have also been read as a story about the human mind (心). In this reading, Wukong is the restless "mind-monkey" (心猿). His stealing of the peaches and his trouble at the Peach Feast show a mind that has not yet learned to control itself.

Daoist writers also used Neidan (internal alchemy) and the Five Elements to explain the garden. In these readings, Sun Wukong's adventures are about the changes that take place during spiritual training.

In his commentary Xiyouji Baihui Xiangzhu (西遊記百回詳注), the Qing dynasty Daoist Liu Yiming explains the garden through Yin and yang and the I Ching. He links its 3,600 peach trees to the Kun (坤) trigram. He also explains the three groups of 1,200 trees and their different ripening times as stages in the change from yin to yang. For Liu, the peaches becoming ripe represent the making of the golden elixir in internal alchemy.

Liu also gives a Daoist meaning to the Peach Feast and the Seven Fairies. He sees their actions, including Wukong stopping the fairies with magic, as signs of changes between yin and yang. The garden story is therefore part of his explanation of how a person may practise internal alchemy.

== Cultural impacts ==
Stories about the Peach Garden influenced Chinese idioms and folk sayings, especially xiehouyu (歇后语). "Sun Wukong guarding the Peach Garden — a ruined affair" (孙悟空看守蟠桃园——坏事) comes from Journey to the West, where Sun Wukong is told to guard the immortal peaches but eats them himself. The saying describes giving responsibility to the wrong or unreliable person. Playwright Tian Han later used the phrase in The Death of a Noted Actor (名优之死) to describe misplaced trust and failure.
