= Hua Giam Si =

Buddhist monastery in Singapore

- Location within Singapore
- Interactive map of Hua Giam Si

Monastery information
- Order: Mahayana (Chan and Shingon)
- Established: 2000

People
- Founder: Venerable Acarya Zhen Ding

Site
- Location: Geylang, Singapore
- Coordinates: 1.3091°N 103.8768°E
- Public access: yes
- Website: hgs.sg

Hua Giam Si (traditional Chinese: 華嚴禪寺; simplified Chinese: 华严禅寺), is a Buddhist monastery in Singapore. The center was originally set up by Venerable Zhen Ding. The present premises are located at Geylang, Singapore.

== Overview ==
Hua Giam Si was founded in 2000 by Venerable Zhen Ding. The temple is inspired by the Huayan school of Chinese Buddhism and the Koyasan Shingon tradition of Japanese Buddhism. It enshrines statues of:

- Mahavairocana
- Mahamayuri
- Guanyin
- Bhaisajyaguru
- The Twelve Heavenly Generals
- Ksitigarbha
- Sūryaprabha
- Candraprabha

== See also ==
- Buddhism in Singapore
