= Kong Xuan =

Character in the Chinese novel Fengshen Yanyi

- 'Investiture of the Gods' character
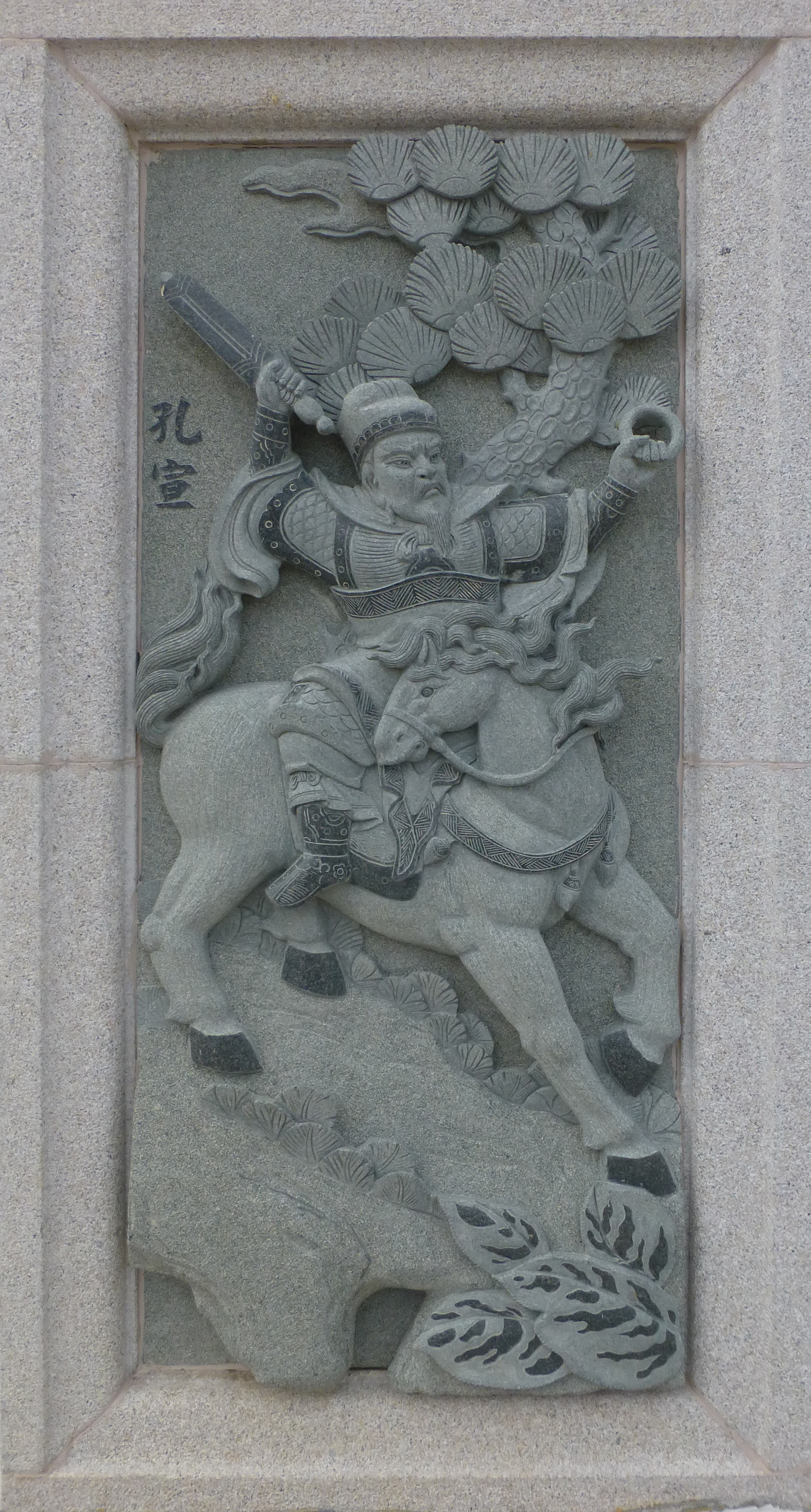
- Kong Xuan at Ping Sien Si Temple in Perak, Malaysia

In-universe information
- Species: Peacock spirit
- Title: Commander of Sanshan Pass (三山关总兵)
- Affiliation: Shang dynasty

Kong Xuan (Chinese: 孔宣; pinyin: Kǒng Xuān) is a peacock spirit in the Chinese novel Fengshen Yanyi. He serves King Zhou of Shang as the commander of Sanshan Pass (三山关). He uses five-colored divine light (五色神光) to capture enemies and magical weapons. He is later defeated by Zhunti Daoren, who takes him to the West.

== Role in the novel ==
Kong Xuan leads the Shang army against King Wu of Zhou and Jiang Ziya. He sets up camp at Jinji Ridge (金鸡岭) to block the Zhou army. His officers include Chen Geng (陈庚), Sun He (孙合), and Gao Jieneng (高继能). After losing several officers, Kong Xuan enters the battle himself.

Kong Xuan can release five-colored light from behind his back. He uses it to capture people and magical weapons. His victims include Hong Jin, Nezha, and Lei Zhenzi. During a night attack, he captures Lei Zhenzi with yellow light and Nezha with white light.

Kong Xuan refuses to surrender to Zhou. He also rejects Jiang Ziya's claim that the fall of Shang is Heaven's will. He continues fighting even after the Zhou army sends more commanders against him.

Kong Xuan later fights Lu Ya Zhenren. When Lu Ya tries to use his Flying Immortal-Slaying Saber, Kong Xuan releases his divine light. Lu Ya escapes by turning into a rainbow.

Randeng Daoren also fails to defeat Kong Xuan. Kong Xuan captures Randeng's twenty-four Dinghai Pearls (定海珠) and golden bowl with his divine light. Randeng then calls on his disciple, a great bird called Dapeng (大鹏), but Kong Xuan defeats him as well.

Zhunti Daoren later arrives from the West and asks Kong Xuan to follow him. Kong Xuan refuses and attacks him. Zhunti uses his Seven Treasures Wonderful Tree (七宝妙树) to knock away Kong Xuan's sword and golden whip.

Kong Xuan then traps Zhunti with his red light. Zhunti breaks free and appears in a form with twenty-four heads and eighteen arms. He subdues Kong Xuan and makes him return to his original form as a peacock. Zhunti rides the peacock back to Jiang Ziya's camp and orders Kong Xuan to release the prisoners. He then takes Kong Xuan to the West.

== Buddhist background ==
Kong Xuan has been identified with the Buddhist Peacock Wisdom King (孔雀明王), or Mahamayuri. In Fengshen Yanyi, he takes the form of a peacock, and a poem calls him a Mingwang (明王).

Gao Zhenhong also identifies Kong Xuan as a form of the Peacock Wisdom King. He notes that Fengshen Yanyi sometimes uses the name Peacock Wisdom King for Zhunti Daoren as well.

== Temple art and theatre ==
A relief at Nanhai Zizhu Temple (南海紫竹寺) in Neimen, Taiwan, shows Kong Xuan blocking the Zhou army at Jinji Ridge. His five-colored light is shown coming from behind him.

Kong Xuan also appears in Chinese opera. In traditional performances recorded in Thailand, he has a green face and a peacock's beak. He wears a prince's crown with feathers, a suit of armour, and carries a guandao.
