= Huo Ling Shengmu =

Fictional character from Investiture of the Gods

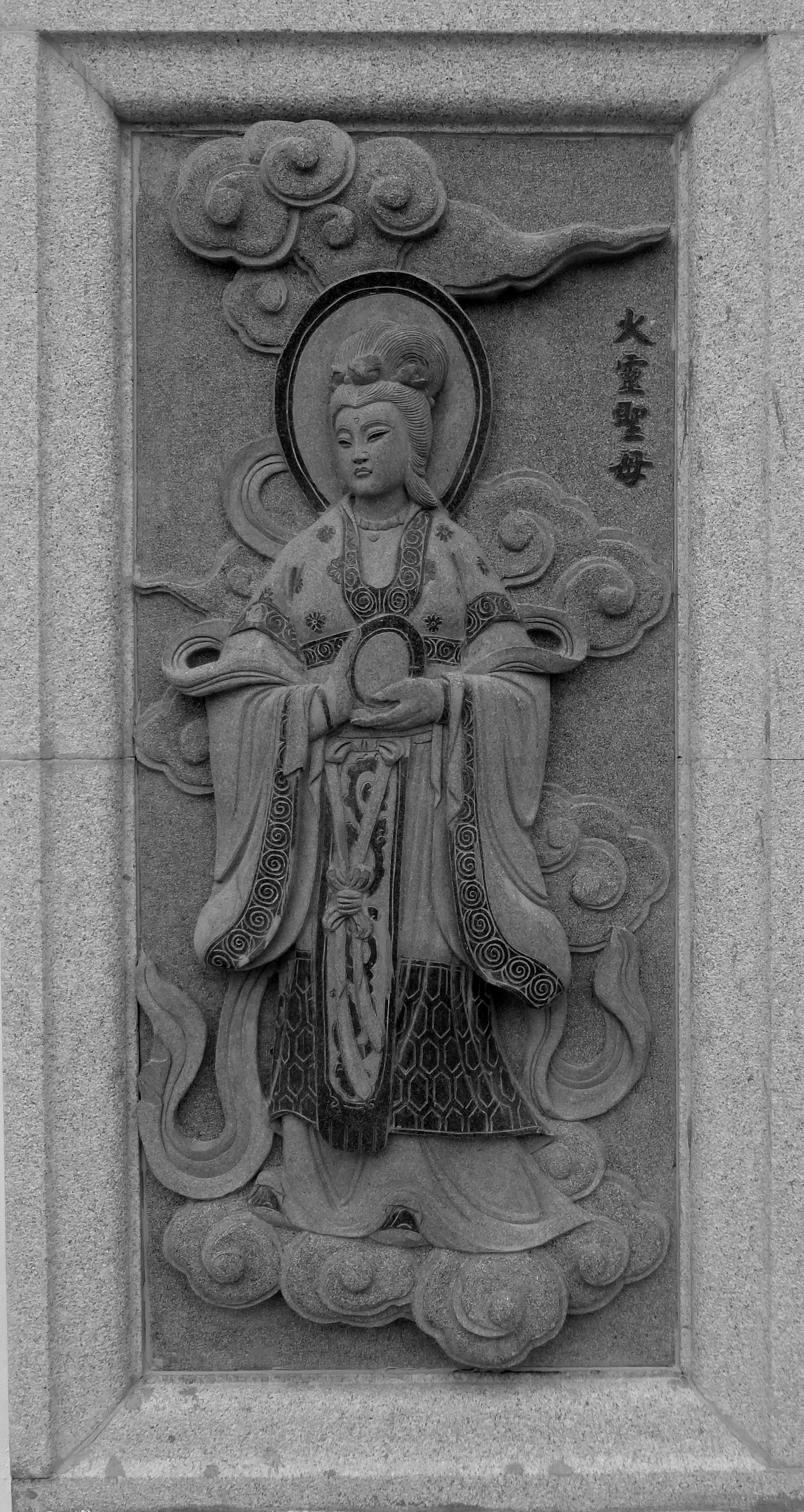
Relief of Huo Ling Shengmu at Ping Sien Si Temple, Malaysia.

Huo Ling Shengmu (simplified Chinese: 火灵圣母; traditional Chinese: 火靈聖母; pinyin: Huǒlíng Shèngmǔ; lit. 'Holy Mother of the Fire Spirit') is a character in the Chinese Ming dynasty novel Investiture of the Gods (Fengshen Yanyi). She is a disciple of Duobao Daoist and a member of the Jie Sect.

== In Fengshen Yanyi ==
Huo Ling Shengmu lives at Qiuming Mountain (邱鸣山). She is the teacher of Hu Lei, who serves as a general at Jiameng Pass. After Hu Lei is killed by Princess Longji, Huo Ling Shengmu goes to Jiameng Pass to avenge him. She wears the Jinxia Crown (金霞冠), whose light prevents her opponents from seeing her, and commands 3,000 Fire Dragon soldiers.

Huo Ling Shengmu defeats Hong Jin and Longji Princess and later wounds Jiang Ziya. Jiang Ziya, Nezha, and Wei Hu attack her together, but she drives them back with the Jinxia Crown and her Fire Dragon soldiers. Guangchengzi then fights her and uses the Heaven-Flipping Seal (番天印) to kill her.

After killing Huo Ling Shengmu, Guangchengzi takes the Jinxia Crown to Tongtian Jiaozhu at Biyou Palace. The death causes several Jie Sect disciples, including Guiling Shengmu, to confront Guangchengzi. The dispute leads to Guangchengzi's repeated visits to Biyou Palace and contributes to the conflict between the Jie and Chan schools.

Huo Ling Shengmu is named the Huofu Star (Chinese: 火府星; lit. 'Fire Palace Star') in the final investiture by Jiang Ziya.

== Worship ==
A field study of folk religion in northern China records Huo Ling Shengmu among the goddesses enshrined at the Niangniang Temple in Gegu, Tianjin. From the Qing dynasty to the Republican period, the temple's main hall contained 13 goddesses, with Huo Ling Shengmu among the four goddesses placed on the right side of the altar.

A Fire God Temple in Yangcheng Village, Jishan, Shanxi, is reported to enshrine Huo Ling Shengmu. A surviving inscription on the temple dates to the Yongzheng period of the Qing dynasty.
