= Mahamayuri =

Bodhisattva and female Wisdom King

Mahāmāyūrī Vidyārājñī
- Painting of Mahāmāyūrī, pigment on silk. Japan, Heian Period, 12th century CE

Chinese name
- Traditional Chinese: 孔雀明王
- Simplified Chinese: 孔雀明王
- Literal meaning: Peacock Wisdom Queen
Transcriptions
Standard Mandarin
- Hanyu Pinyin: Kǒngquè Míngwáng

Vietnamese name
- Vietnamese: Khổng Tước Minh Vương

Korean name
- Hangul: 공작명왕
Transcriptions
- Revised Romanization: Gongjak Myeongwang

Japanese name
- Kanji: 孔雀明王
Transcriptions
- Romanization: Kujaku Myōō

Sanskrit name
- Sanskrit: Mahāmāyūrī Vidyārājñī

Mahamayuri (Sanskrit: महामायूरी Mahāmāyūrī ("great peacock"), Chinese: 孔雀明王 Kǒngquè Míngwáng, Vietnamese: Khổng Tước Minh Vương, Japanese: 孔雀明王, romanized: Kujaku Myōō, Korean: 공작명왕 Gongjak Myeongwang), or Mahāmāyūrī Vidyārājñī is a bodhisattva and female Wisdom King in Mahayana and Vajrayana Buddhism. In the latter tradition, Mahamayuri is a popular practice in both the Chinese and Japanese forms of Vajrayana. She is also the name of one of the five protective goddesses in Buddhism.

In Chinese Buddhism and Shingon Buddhism, it is believed that the Great Peacock King is an incarnation of either Vairocana Buddha or Shakyamuni Buddha. Its main merits include the elimination of poison and disease, the protection of the country, the dispelling of disasters, and the ability to pray for both rain and cessation of rain.

== Name and origin ==
The Sanskrit name Mahāmāyūrī means 'great peahen'. Known as the 'Queen of the secret sciences' and the 'Godmother of Buddha', Mahamayuri is believed to have the power to protect devotees from poisoning, either physical or spiritual. In Buddhism, her demeanor is in contrast to the wrathful attitudes of male personifications of the Wisdom Kings.

The Mahamayuri text is a Buddhist dharani-genre text, containing magical incantations to treat snake bites, poisons and other maladies. Mahamayuri's dharani was translated into Chinese by Kumārajīva between 402 and 412 CE. It contains the only mention of the Rig Veda in the entire Chinese Buddhist canon.

Her origins are said to derive from an Indian goddess of the same name. She is one of the Nepali pañcarakṣā deities, where she is the chief of the five rakṣā (守護) in the five parasol configuration, occupying the northern position. Unlike her four companions of the pañcarakṣā she appears to have had a fairly well-developed cult in India.

== Iconography ==
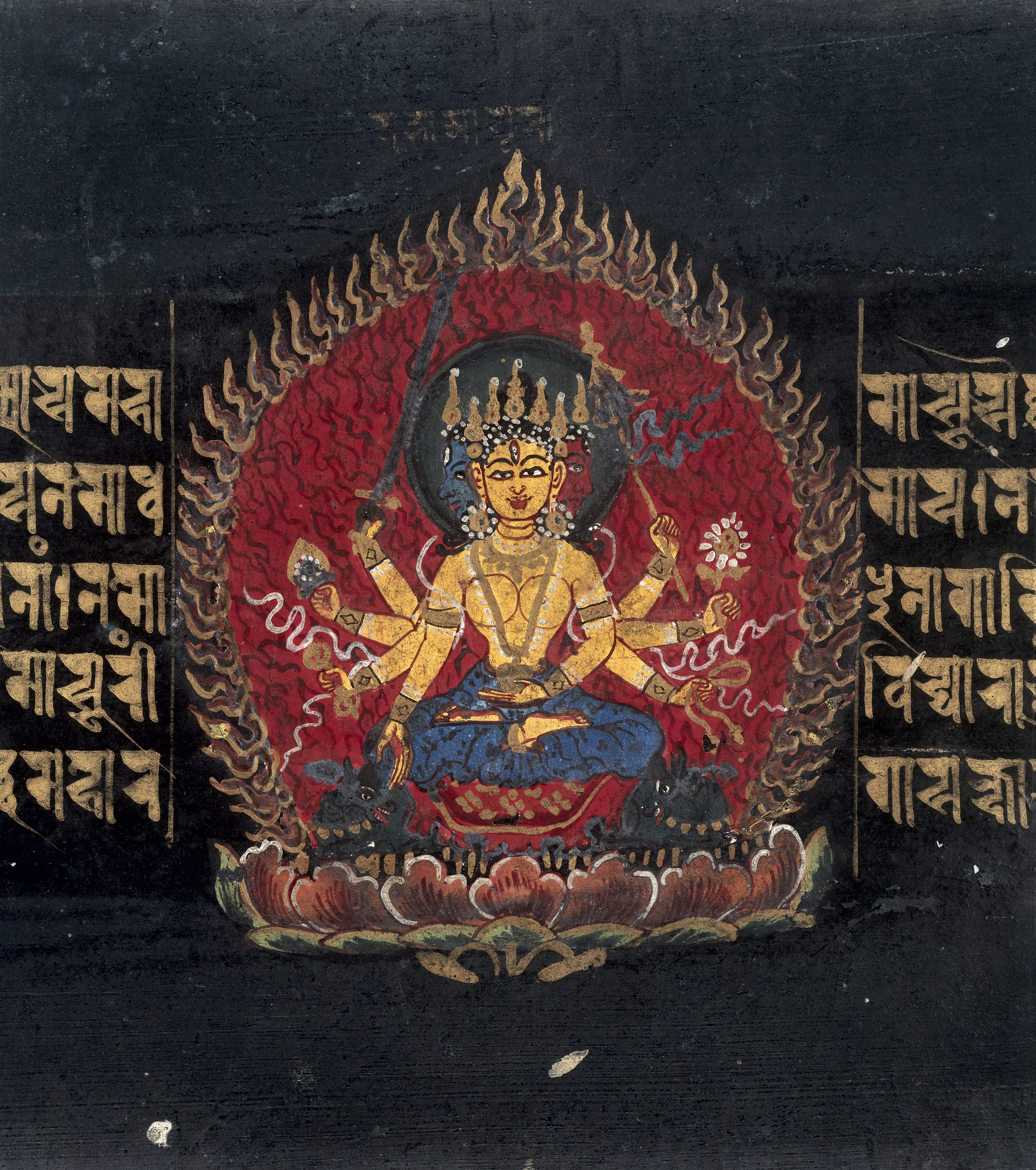
A miniature depicting Mahamayuri from the Pañcarakṣā

Despite being associated with the Wisdom Kings, Mahāmāyūrī tends to be portrayed with a benevolent expression rather than a wrathful one. She has three faces and six hands.

According to the Ritual for Painting the Image and Setting Up the Altar of the Great Peacock King Buddha Mother (大孔雀明王畫像壇場儀軌), Mahamayuri is depicted as a white human-headed peacock with four arms. She is often seated on a lotus flower or a peacock throne. The right hand holds a lotus flower, which represents the purity of his wisdom. The second right hand holds the fruit of all causes, which represents his ability to fulfill all wishes. The left hand holds a wish-fulfilling fruit, which represents his ability to grant all desires. The second left hand holds three or five peacock tails, which represent his power to dispel poison and disease. In the Garbhadhātu Mandala, Mahamayuri is enshrined in the sixth position of the southernmost corner of the Susiddhivīja.

She is often portrayed riding a peacock and commonly sporting four arms. Although the items she holds vary among traditions, common items include a citron, bael fruit, lotus flower, and a peacock tail feather. With the moon as a background, wear peaceful ornaments and garments. Seated in the half (vajrasana) posture.

== Legends ==
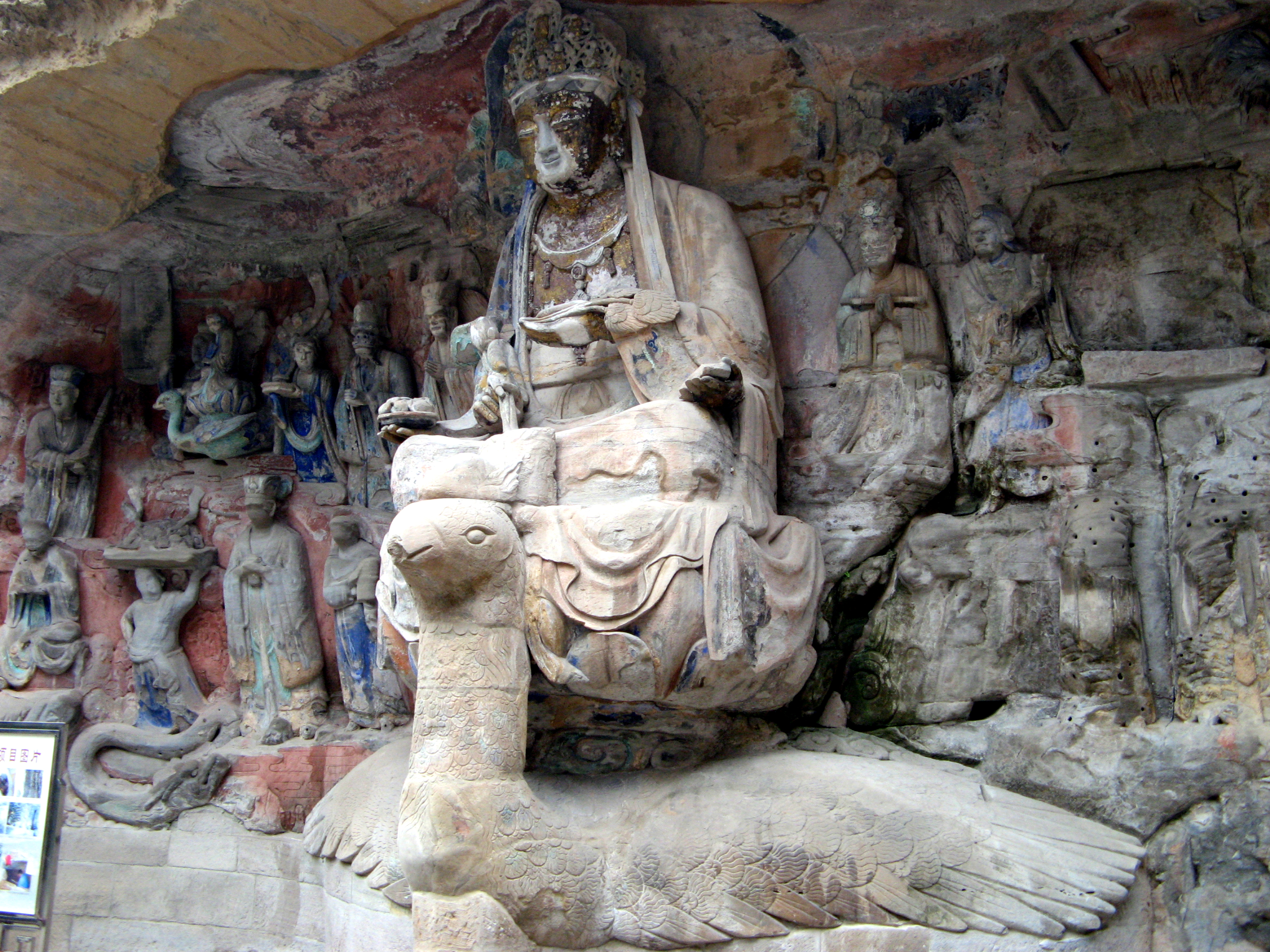
Song dynasty (960 - 1270) statue of Mahāmāyūrī (Kongque Mingwang) at the Dazu Rock Carvings in Chongqing, China

Legend holds that in primordial times, the original Phoenix (Fenghuang), the leader of flying beings, gave birth to the peacock Mahamayuri and to the eagle named the Golden-Winged Great Peng. The peacock once consumed the Buddha in one of his previous lives, who managed to escape by cutting through her stomach. At that time, the peacock preyed on humans, and the Buddha intended to kill it. However, the deities intervened and urged him to stop. In exchange for a promise to renounce its habit of preying on humans, the Buddha elevated the peacock to the status of his godmother, while the eagle became his uncle and was granted a high position in heaven.

In the Mahamayuri Tantra, it is stated that Mahamayuri assumes various forms to assist the Buddha, including taking on the human form of Queen Maya.

Kong Xuan, a peacock spirit in the Ming Dynasty novel Fengshen Yanyi, is based on the figure of Mahamayuri. Kong Xuan appears as a powerful general under Di Xin.

=== Journey to the West ===
The 16th-century Chinese novel Journey to the West includes a story about how the king of the Kingdom of Zhuzi had a hobby of hunting when he was a young prince. One day, he accidentally killed two followers of Mahamayuri. Later on, Mahamayuri said that to pay for this, the prince would suffer a lovesickness for 3 years. At the time, the bodhisattva Guanyin's mount Golden-Haired Hou went across the scene and managed to hear this. Years later, when the prince had grown up and became the king of the kingdom, the Golden Haired Hou took advantage of the child who guards him sleeping, escaped to the mortal realm, became the demon king Sai Tai Sui, and kidnapped the Lady of Jinsheng Palace (金聖宮娘娘), one of the king's favorite consorts, and forced her to marry him. Without the lady, the king got sick for three years.

=== Mahamayuri Vidyarajni Sutra ===
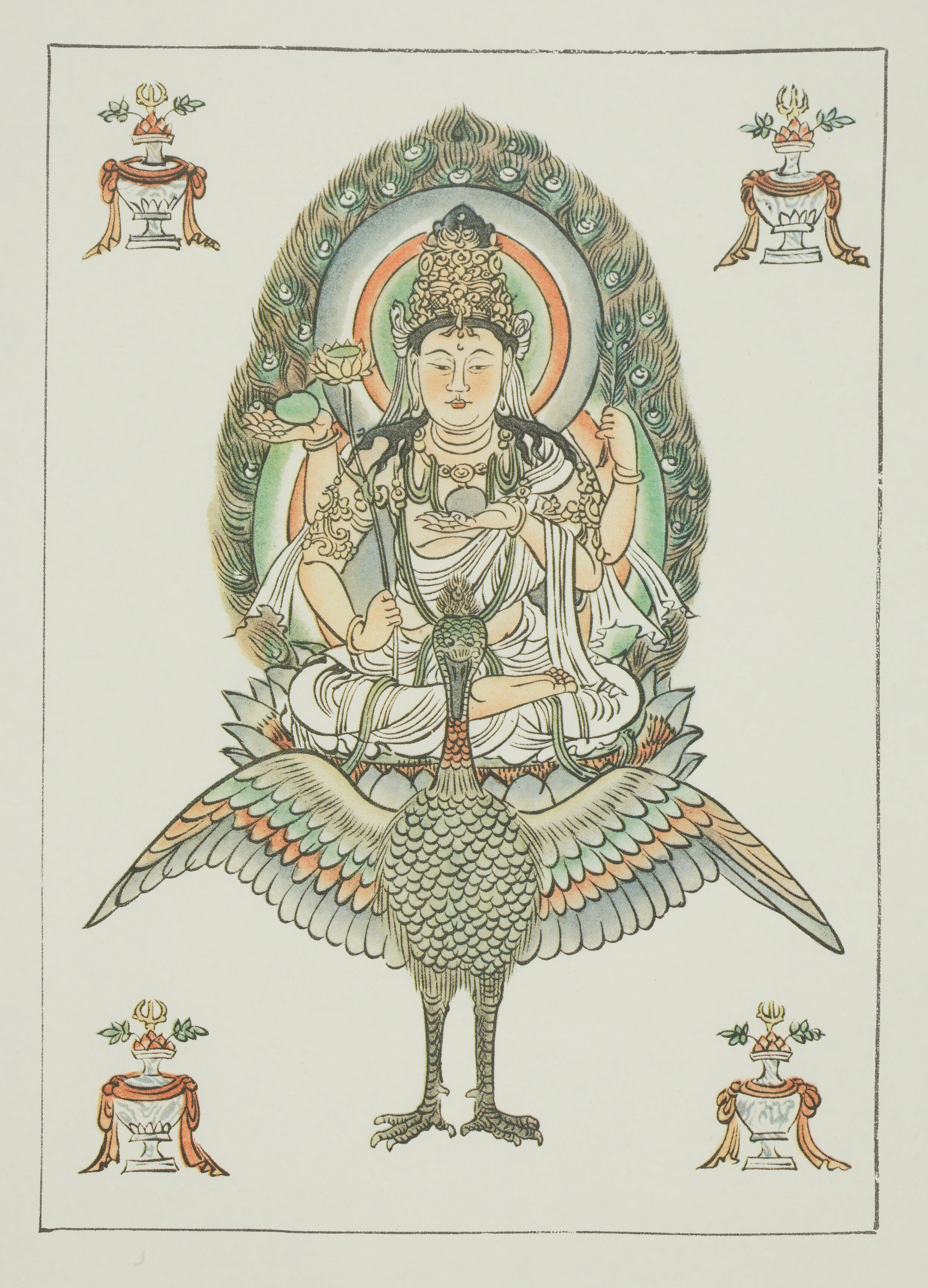
Image of Mahāmāyūrī (Kujaku Myōō) from the Taishō Shinshū Daizōkyō

According to the Mahamayuri Vidyarajni Sutra, during the time of the Buddha, there was a recently ordained monk named Sāḍdhi. Despite his brief time as a monk, he had already received the precepts and was diligently studying the Vinaya rules. While engaged in gathering firewood and preparing a bath for fellow monks, Sāḍdhi encountered a perilous situation when a large black snake emerged from a hole in a decaying tree and bit him on his right big toe. The venom swiftly spread throughout his body, causing him to collapse unconscious on the ground, foaming at the mouth, with his eyes rolled back.

Ananda, witnessing the distressing scene, promptly sought the Buddha's assistance. In response, the Buddha informed Ananda about the potent mantra of the Mahamayuri (Great Peacock) Buddha Mother, emphasizing its ability to counteract poisons, dispel fears, avert calamities, and safeguard and nurture all sentient beings, leading them to happiness. The Buddha proceeded to impart the Mahamayuri Vidyarajni mantra to Ananda, who hastened back to Sāḍdhi and employed the mantra for healing. Through the power of the mantra, the poison was eradicated, and Sāḍdhi regained consciousness, fully restored to health. Expressing the significance of the mantra, the Buddha instructed Ananda to propagate it among all sentient beings, offering protection from harm and the opportunity to attain happiness. The Mahamayuri Vidyarajni Sutra is a Mahayana Buddhist scripture that imparts the mantra of the Mahamayuri Buddha Mother. This mantra is reputed for its ability to safeguard against harm, alleviate ailments, and usher in happiness. Widely embraced by Mahayana Buddhism practitioners, the mantra is frequently chanted as a means of spiritual practice.

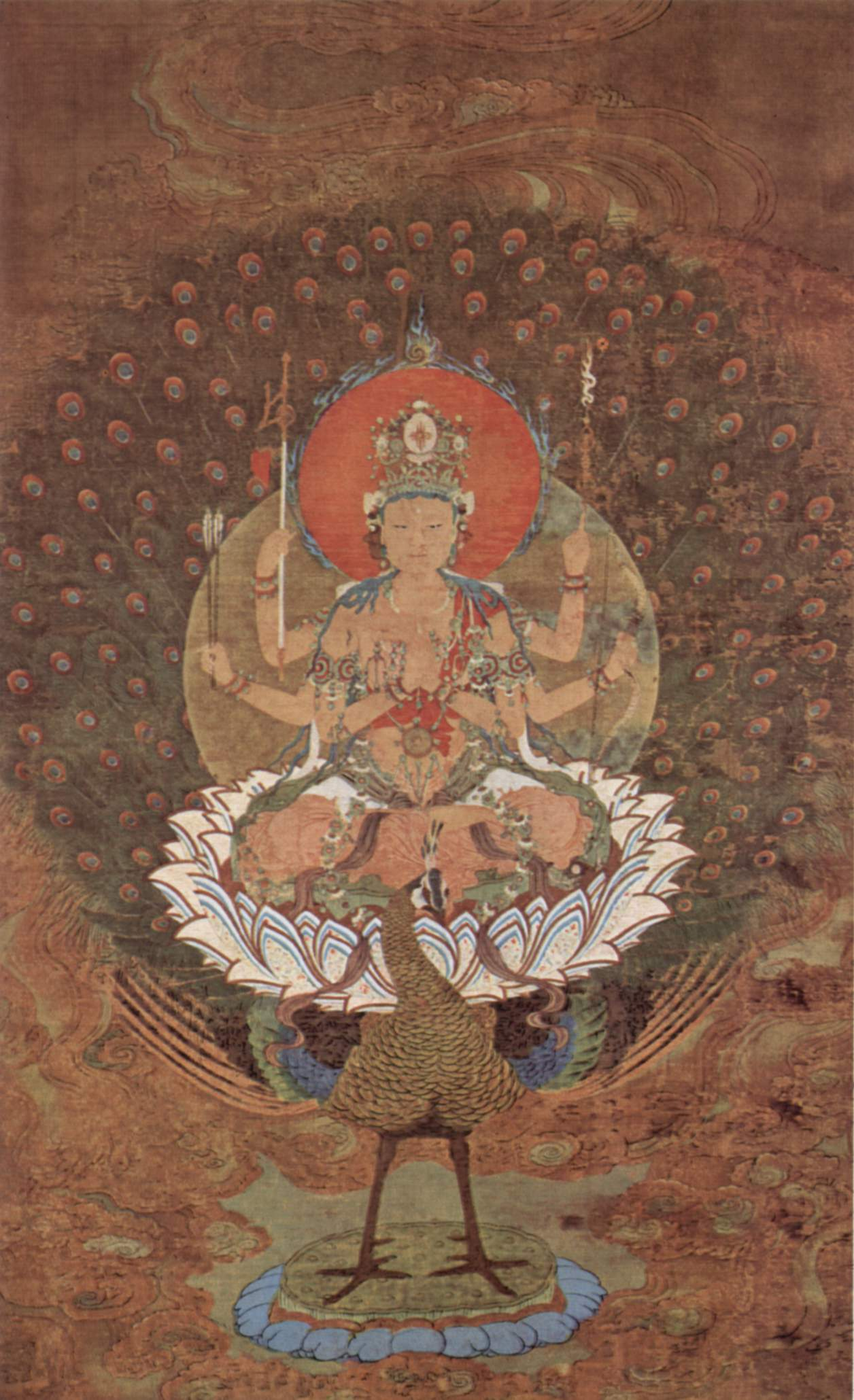
Song dynasty (960 - 1270) painting of Mahāmāyūrī (Kongque Mingwang)

The Buddha imparted the Mahamayuri Vidyarajni Sutra with the specific intention of addressing the manifold challenges faced by sentient beings. According to the sutra, both the text and the mantra possess the extraordinary power to alleviate diseases, afflictions, and fears while serving as a protective shield for all living beings. Instructing Ananda to disseminate this sutra and mantra widely, the Buddha aimed to liberate sentient beings from suffering and guide them towards the attainment of happiness.

Delving into the origin of the Buddha's emphasis on this mantra, the sutra recounts a past life where the Buddha existed as a golden peacock king residing on the southern slope of Mount Meru. Engaging in the daily recitation of the mantra, the king experienced perpetual peace in mind and body. However, a lapse occurred when, driven by desire, he neglected the mantra to frolic with his peacock consorts in the forest. Succumbing to intoxication and a loss of mindfulness, he inadvertently fell into a hunter's trap. Bound and facing peril, he remembered the mantra, reciting it and miraculously securing his release, with his consorts emerging unscathed.

Recognizing the formidable efficacy of this mantra, the Buddha discerned its capacity to mitigate grave transgressions, eradicate minor wrongdoings, and dispel all forms of suffering. Out of compassion, the Buddha shared this transformative mantra with all sentient beings, envisioning that its constant recitation would empower individuals to transcend fear, surmount suffering, perpetually attract good fortune, evade danger, and live long and contented lives.

== In Chinese Buddhism ==
In China, she is known as Kǒngquè Míngwáng (孔雀明王) and her image is enshrined in many Chinese Buddhist temples. In contemporary times, her veneration is thought to be closely related to medical care, public health, environmental protection, and social welfare.

In China, some of the temples which venerate her include the Luohan Temple in Chongqing, Wuyou Temple, Baoguang Temple and Fuhu Temple in Sichuan, Shifo Temple in Shaanxi, Jinguangming Temple in Fujian, as well as Qiongzhu Temple in Yunnan. In Taiwan, her veneration is promoted by the Chinese Great Peacock Buddha Association(中華世界大孔雀佛協會), which has their main headquarters located at Kaicheng Temple. In Singapore, one temple which venerates her is Hua Gim Si Temple.

== In Japanese Buddhism ==
In Japan she was known as the name Kujaku Myōō (孔雀明王). There is a record stating that she was worshiped during the Nara period, and her image was placed at the newly constructed Saidai-ji Temple Kondo (Saidai-ji Temple Golden Hall).

== See also ==
- Chinese Buddhism
- Chinese gods and immortals
- List of Japanese deities
