= Zhunti Daoren =

Character in the Chinese novel Fengshen Yanyi

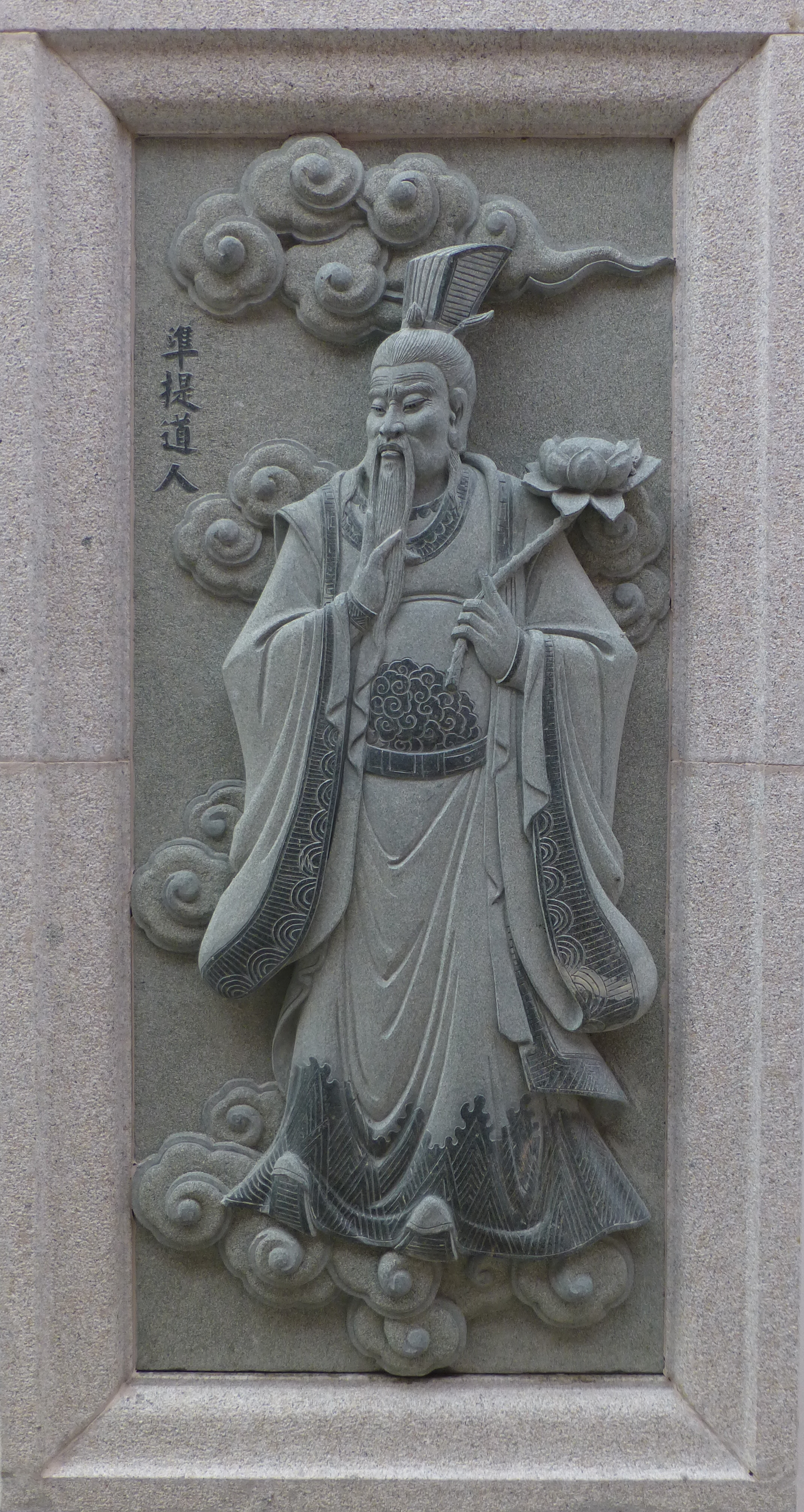
Zhunti Daoren

Zhunti Daoren (Chinese: 准提道人; pinyin: Zhǔntí Dàorén) is a character in the Chinese novel Fengshen Yanyi. He is one of the leaders of the Western Sect (西方教), together with Jieyin Daoren. In the novel, he comes from the Western Pure Land and takes part in the conflict between the Chan sect and Jie sect.

Zhunti first appears when he travels from the West to intervene on behalf of Ma Yuan, a demon who is about to be executed by the Chan sect. He later defeats Kong Xuan, takes him to the West, and participates in the battles against Tongtian Jiaozhu and the Jie sect. Scholars have identified the character with Cundi, a Buddhist deity, although interpretations of his religious identity vary.

== Role in the novel ==
Zhunti Daoren first appears when Wenshu Guangfa Tianzun is about to kill Ma Yuan, a demon who eats human hearts. Zhunti says that Ma Yuan is not on the List of Gods and has a connection with the Western Sect (西方教). Wenshu allows Zhunti to take Ma Yuan to the West.

Zhunti later defeats Kong Xuan, who has stopped the Zhou army at Jinji Ridge. Kong Xuan tries to capture him with his five-colored divine light, but Zhunti escapes and shows his form with twenty-four heads and eighteen arms. He makes Kong Xuan return to his original form as a peacock and takes him to the West.

Zhunti also saves Fa Jie (法戒) from execution and takes him to the West. He later joins Jieyin Daoren, Laozi, and Yuanshi Tianzun in fighting Tongtian Jiaozhu. During the battle at the Immortal-Slaying Formation, Zhunti strikes Tongtian with his Demon-Subduing Pestle (加持神杵), knocking him from his mount.

During the battle at the Ten Thousand Immortals Formation (萬仙陣), Zhunti uses the Six-Root Pure Bamboo (六根清靜竹) to capture Wuyun Xian (烏雲仙), who returns to his original form as a golden ao (鰲), a giant mythical creature. Zhunti later fights Tongtian again and breaks his sword with the Seven-Treasure Tree (七寶妙樹).

== Interpretations ==
Zhunti Daoren is often identified with Cundi, a Buddhist bodhisattva. Both figures have eighteen arms, and the name Zhunti comes from Cundi.

Wei Juxian suggested that Zhunti Daoren represents the Panchen Lama and Jieyin Daoren represents the Dalai Lama. Other scholars have questioned this view because the two characters lack clear Tibetan Buddhist features. Tianyu Lei also points out that the Qing dynasty events used in the comparison took place after Fengshen Yanyi was written.

The worship of Cundi also spread into Daoism. The Heart Sutra of Zhunti (准提心經) was included in the Daozang jiyao (道藏輯要), a collection of Daoist texts. Lei sees this as part of the spread of Cundi worship beyond Buddhism.

== Temples ==
Zhunti Daoren is worshipped at several Daoist temples in China. At Weibaoshan in Dali, Yunnan, the Zhunti Pavilion (準提閣) enshrines Zhunti Daoren as its principal deity. The nearby Qingxia Palace (青霞宮), also known as Laojun Hall, enshrines Taishang Laojun, Zhunti Daoren, and other figures.
