= Xu Zhonglin =

Xu Zhonglin may refer to:

- Xu Zhonglin (novelist), Chinese Ming dynasty novelist, author of 16th-century novel Investiture of the Gods
- Xu Zhonglin (politician), politician and governor of Anhui province from 2000 to 2002
