= Jieyin Daoren =

Investiture of the Gods character

Jieyin Daoren (Chinese: 接引道人; pinyin: Jiēyǐn Dàorén; lit. 'The Welcoming Daoist'), also known as Taoist Jieyin, is a character in the Chinese novel Investiture of the Gods (Fengshen Yanyi). He is the leader of the Western Sect (西方教, Xifang Jiao), with his junior fellow disciple Zhunti Daoren. In the novel, he resides in the Western Paradise and takes part in the conflict between the Chan and Jie sects. He has been identified by scholars with Amitabha Buddha.

== In the novel ==
Jieyin Daoren resides in the Western Paradise. He is described as six zhang tall and as having attained śarīra (舍利子). Jieyin enters the conflict between the Chan and Jie sects when Zhunti Daoren returns to the West and asks him to help break the Zhuxian Array (诛仙阵), which has been established by Tongtian Jiaozhu. Jieyin initially says that he has never left the Western Pure Land and is unfamiliar with affairs in the mortal world, but agrees to accompany Zhunti to the east.

Jieyin and Zhunti join Yuanshi Tianzun and Laozi in attacking the Zhuxian Array. Jieyin enters the Lixian Gate (戮仙门), one of the four gates of the formation. When Tongtian Jiaozhu activates the Lixian Sword (戮仙剑), three śarīra appear above Jieyin's head and block its attack. The four figures then attack the four gates of the formation, and the Zhuxian Array is broken.

Jieyin later takes part in the battle against the Ten Thousand Immortals Array (万仙阵), which Tongtian Jiaozhu establishes after the defeat of the Zhuxian Array. He joins Yuanshi Tianzun, Laozi, and Zhunti Daoren in the battle. During the fighting, Jieyin uses the Qiankun Bag (乾坤袋) to capture Jie sect immortals, who are taken to the West. Jieyin also possesses the Twelve-Petaled Golden Lotus of Merit (十二品功德金莲). The Mosquito Daoist (蚊道人) later consumes three of its petals, leaving it with nine. The incident occurs after Jieyin captures Our Lady of Turtle Spirit (龟灵圣母).

After Hongjun Laozu intervenes in the conflict and takes Tongtian Jiaozhu away, Jieyin Daoren takes his leave and returns to the West.

== Religious background ==
The Lidai shenxian tongjian (歷代神仙通鑑) calls Jieyin "Master Jieyin Amitabha Buddha" (接引大師阿彌陀佛). It describes his golden body and forty-eight vows. The same work identifies Zhunti Daoren with Cundi, who has three heads and eighteen arms.

== Interpretations ==
Jieyin Daoren is believed to be based on Amitabha Buddha. Yamashita Kazuo identifies the Western Sect (西方教) in Investiture of the Gods with Pure Land Buddhism. He notes that Amitabha welcomes believers into the Western Pure Land, while the name Jieyin (接引) means to guide or welcome. Yoshihiro Nikaido also identifies Jieyin Daoren with Amitabha.

Jieyin and Zhunti Daoren lead the Western Sect together. Yamashita suggests that Zhunti takes the place of Guanyin beside Amitabha because Guanyin appears in the novel as Cihang Daoren. Tianyu Lei also examines the two characters and their links to Pure Land Buddhism. He notes that the title daoren (道人) was used for both Daoists and Buddhists, so the title alone does not show which religion they belong to.

Wei Juxian suggested that Jieyin represents the Dalai Lama and Zhunti represents the Panchen Lama. Other scholars have questioned this view because the two characters have no clear Tibetan Buddhist features. Lei also points out that the Qing dynasty events used in Wei's argument took place after Investiture of the Gods was written.

In Chapter 84, Hongjun Laozu calls Jieyin and Zhunti his fellow Daoists (道友), while Laozi, Yuanshi Tianzun, and Tongtian Jiaozhu are his disciples. Han Jingyu sees this as showing that the Western Sect is separate from Hongjun's disciples and stands on equal terms with them.

== See also ==
- Investiture of the Gods
- Zhunti Daoren
- Amitabha
