= Puxian Zhenren =

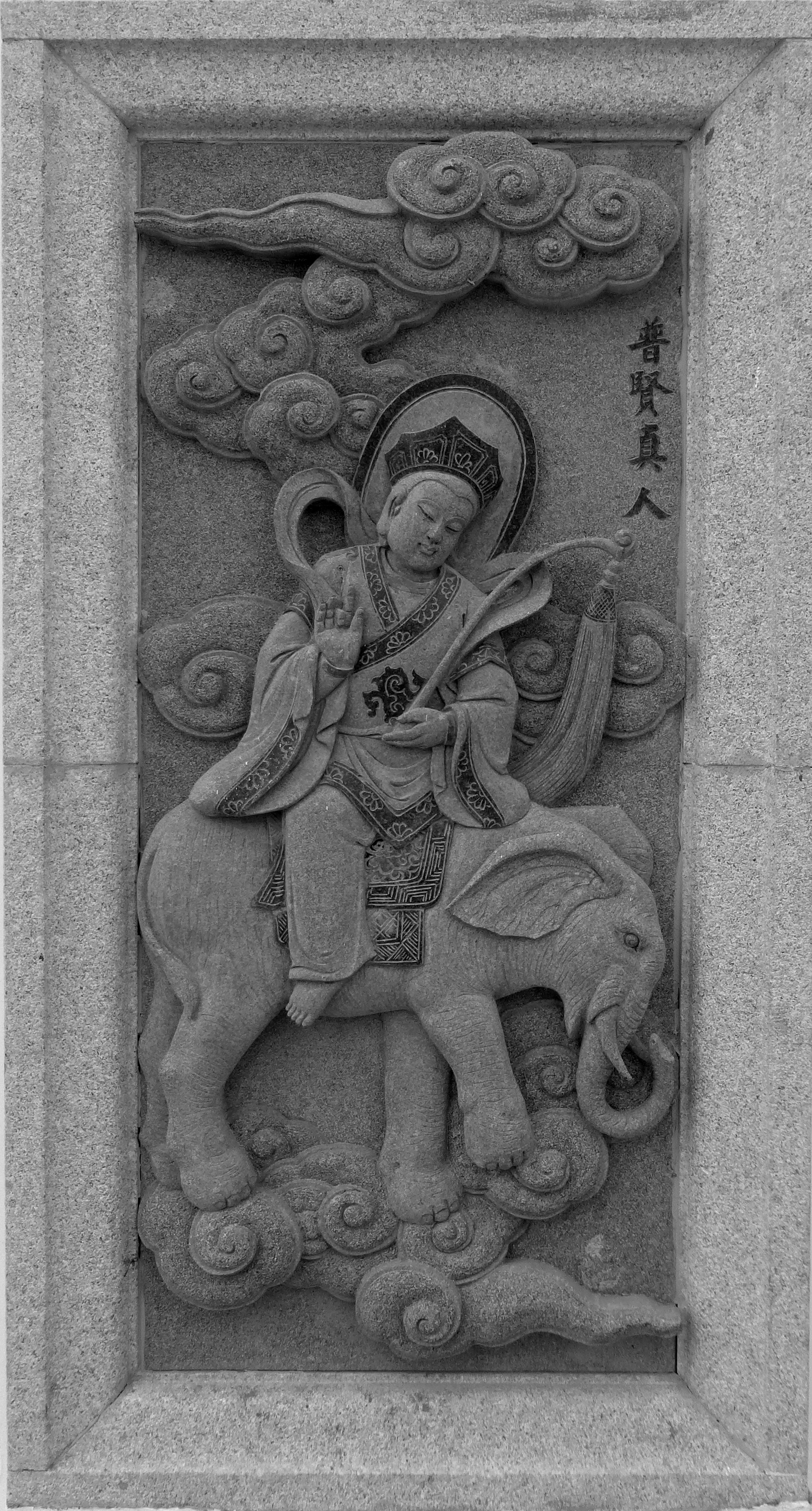
Puxian Zhenren as depicted on a relief at Ping Sien Si Temple in Perak, Malaysia

Puxian Zhenren (Chinese: 普賢真人; pinyin: Pǔxián Zhēnrén) is a deity in the Ming dynasty novel Investiture of the Gods (Fengshen Yanyi). He is one of the Twelve Golden Immortals (十二金仙) of the Chan Sect (闡教), led by Yuanshi Tianzun, and the master of Muzha.

In Chinese religion, Puxian Zhenren is often identified as the Taoist counterpart of the Buddhist bodhisattva Samantabhadra (Puxian Pusa).

== In Investiture of the Gods ==
Puxian Zhenren is one of the Twelve Golden Immortals of the Chan Sect. He lives in White Crane Cave (白鹤洞) on Jiugong Mountain (九宫山). His disciple is Muzha, the second son of Li Jing and the elder brother of Nezha. Muzha learns magic from him and carries a pair of swords called the Twin Wu Gou Swords (吴钩双剑). Puxian sends him to help Jiang Ziya in the war against the Shang dynasty.

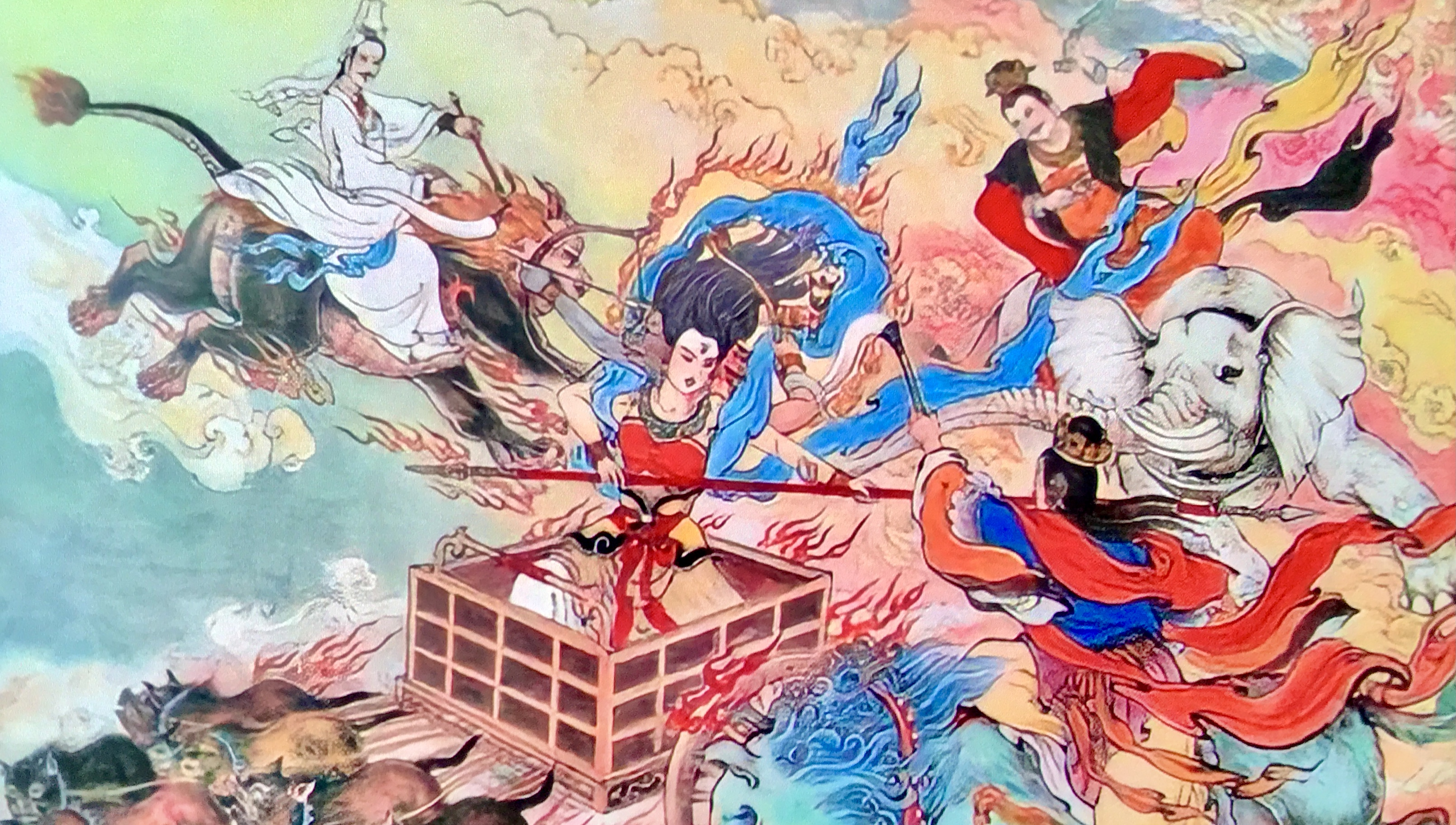
The battle between Puxian Zhenren, Wenshu Guangfa Tianzun, Cihang Daoren, and Jinling Shengmu

Puxian also joins the war on Jiang Ziya's side. He fights against members of the Jie Sect and uses several magical weapons, including the Wu Gou Swords and the Long Rainbow Rope (长虹索). He breaks the Cold Ice Array (寒冰阵), one of the Ten Absolutes Array, and kills its master, Yuan Jiao (袁角), with a Wu Gou Sword.

Puxian later fights Lingya Xian (灵牙仙) in the Myriad Immortal Array (万仙阵). Yuanshi Tianzun gives him the Taiji Talisman (太极符印) to break Lingya's Two Principles Array (两仪阵). In the fight, Puxian takes on a golden form with three heads and six arms (三首六臂金身). He uses the Long Rainbow Rope to capture Lingya, who is then forced to return to his true form as a white elephant. The elephant becomes Puxian's mount.

Puxian also fights Jinling Shengmu alongside Wenshu Guangfa Tianzun and Cihang Daoren. The three surround her and fight using their magical forms. Jinling Shengmu holds them off until Randeng Daoren strikes her with a magical pearl and kills her. Puxian is later named as the Buddhist bodhisattva Samantabhadra (普贤菩萨), while Wenshu becomes Manjushri and Cihang becomes Guanyin.

== Interpretations ==
Kazuo Yamashita argues that Puxian Zhenren's Taoist identity was a deliberate choice by the author of Investiture of the Gods. By the Ming dynasty, the Buddhist bodhisattva Samantabhadra had become closely linked to Mount Emei in China. Yamashita believes that the author reversed this history by presenting Puxian as a Chinese immortal who later entered Buddhism. He sees this as part of the author's attempt to give Buddhist figures a place in the Chinese world of immortals, rather than simply copying their Buddhist identities.

== Related sites ==
In the Yulin Caves-Cave 3 depicts Samantabhadra riding a white elephant and surrounded by "Daoist-influenced celestial beings" (道教化的天人), combining Buddhist and Daoist imagery in a single composition.

Jiugong Mountain, in present-day Tongshan County, Hubei, has long been associated with Daoism. In Investiture of the Gods, it is the location of Puxian Zhenren's White Crane Cave (白鹤洞). According to historical records, the Daoist priest Zhang Daoqing established a number of Daoist temples on the mountain during the Southern Song dynasty, after which it became an important Daoist religious site and was regarded as one of China's Five Great Daoist centers (五大道场).

At the Qingyang Palace (青羊宫), one of the oldest Taoist temples in Chengdu, Sichuan, Puxian Zhenren is enshrined in the Sanqing Hall (三清殿). The hall's main altar is dedicated to the Three Pure Ones and is flanked by statues of the Twelve Golden Immortals, including Qingxu Daode Zhenjun.
