= Princess Longji =

Fictional character from Investiture of the Gods

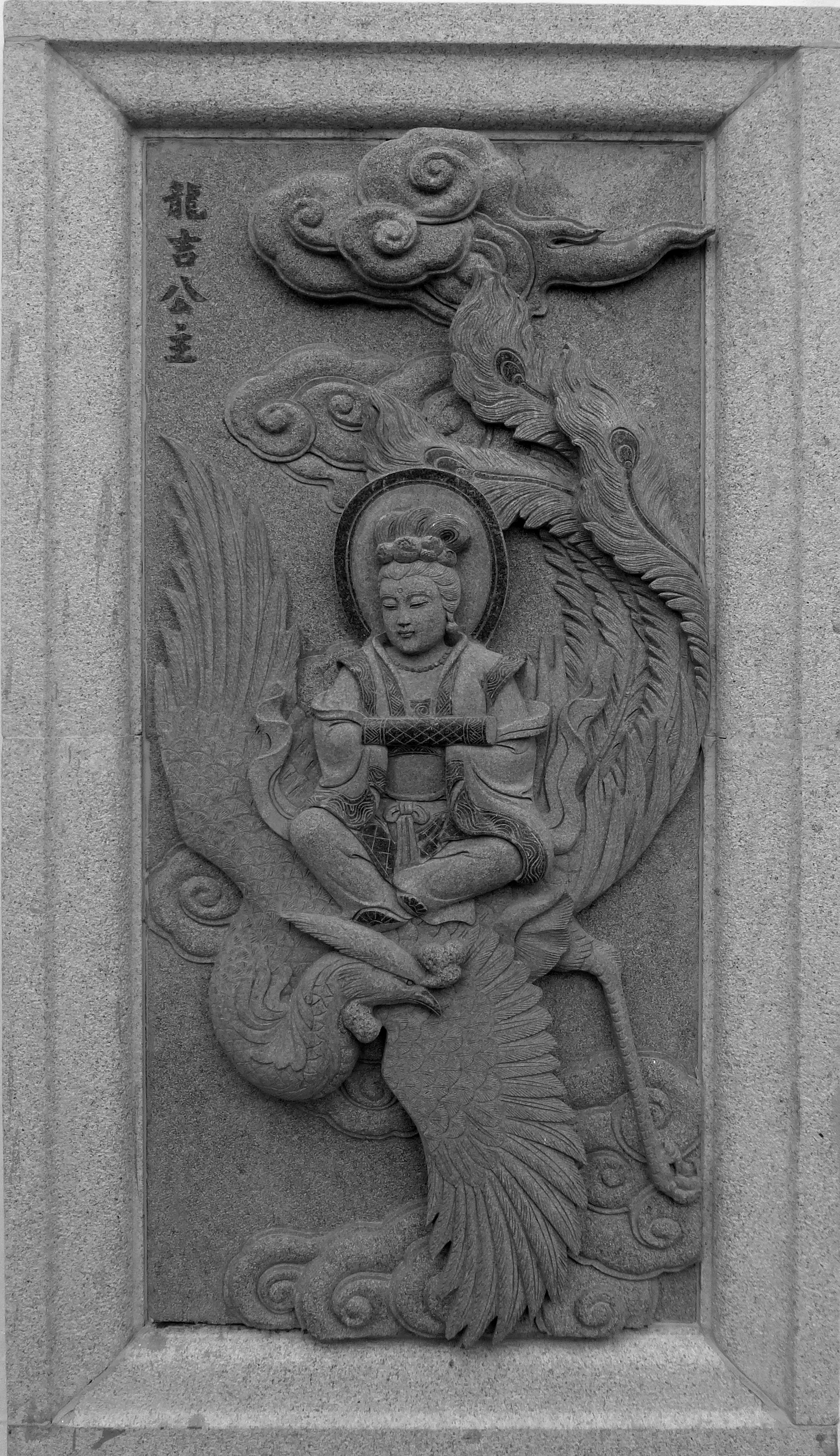
A statue of Princess Longji at Ping Sien Si Temple.

Princess Longji (Chinese: 龙吉公主; pinyin: Lóngjí Gōngzhǔ) is a character in the Chinese novel Investiture of the Gods (Fengshen Yanyi). In the novel, she is the daughter of Haotian Shangdi and Yaochi Jinmu and lives at Phoenix Mountain after being banished from the celestial realm. She later joins the Zhou forces during the war against the Shang dynasty, marries the Shang general Hong Jin, and is killed during the battle of the Ten Thousand Immortals Array. She is subsequently appointed the deity of the Red Phoenix Star (红鸾星).

== Role in the novel ==
=== Fengshen Yanyi ===
Longji is first introduced in Chapter 55, when Yang Jian reaches Phoenix Mountain and encounters her. She identifies herself as the daughter of Haotian Shangdi and Yaochi Jinmu. She explains that she was banished to the mortal world after committing an offense at the Peach Festival. She had been responsible for serving wine at the festival and had violated the rules of Yaochi. She also says that she had developed thoughts of descending to the mortal world.

Longji later goes to Xiqi after learning that Jiang Ziya is leading the Zhou campaign against the Shang. When Luo Xuan attacks the city with fire, Longji arrives and uses magic to extinguish the flames. She explains that she has come to assist Jiang Ziya and the Zhou forces so that she can perform meritorious deeds and eventually return to Yaochi.

During the battle, Longji uses the Wulu Universe Net (雾露乾坤网) and the Four Seas Bottle (四海瓶). She extinguishes Luo Xuan's fire and captures several of his magical weapons. She later wounds Luo Xuan and assists the Zhou forces in defeating him.

Longji later captures the Shang general Hong Jin. Jiang Ziya orders that Hong Jin be executed, but before the execution a Daoist named Yuehe arrives and says that Longji and Hong Jin have a marriage bond in the mortal world. He explains that the marriage was arranged through a red-thread bond and that Longji's descent to the mortal world was connected with this fate. Longji initially objects, saying that she had already been banished from Yaochi and did not want another worldly entanglement. After Yuehe tells her that she will be able to return to Yaochi after completing the required deeds, she accepts the arrangement. Hong Jin is released, and he and Longji marry.

Longji continues to participate in the war after her marriage. During the later battles, she fights against several Shang commanders and takes part in the battle of the Ten Thousand Immortals Array.

At the Ten Thousand Immortals Array, Longji enters the formation together with Hong Jin. She fights against the opposing immortals and is eventually struck by Jinling Shengmu. Longji is killed in the battle, followed by Hong Jin.

In Chapter 99, Jiang Ziya completes the enfeoffment of the deceased. Longji is appointed as the Red Phoenix Star (红鸾星), while Hong Jin is appointed as the Dragon Virtue Star (龙德星).

=== Legend of the Queen Mother of the West ===
In the 2000 novel Legend of the Queen Mother of the West (西王母传奇), Princess Longji is given a different backstory. Her mother, the Queen Mother of the West, orders her to offer a 9,000-year peach to Nüwa. The Seventh Fairy gives Longji a 6,000-year peach to console her, but a mouse spirit steals it in the Peach Garden of Immortality. After eating the peach, the spirit gains immortality and later assumes human form. Longji blames Nüwa for the loss.

Years later, Nüwa visits the Yaochi Palace with her attendant Zhao Gongming and his sacred white elephant. After the elephant frightens Longji, she decides to take revenge. She steals the Yaochi Swords, captures the immortal mouse spirit, and tricks it into killing the white elephant. When the Queen Mother learns what happened, she becomes angry and, following the pleas of Longji's seven sisters, exiles Longji to the Peach Garden, where she is placed under guard.

Longji later escapes with her maid Meixiang and travels to the Eastern Women's Kingdom in search of a ten-thousand-year Lingzhi mushroom needed to cure a plague. During the journey, she kills a giant python guarding the mushroom but is poisoned by a flying snake. Meixiang saves her with part of the Lingzhi. Longji later encounters Zhao Gongming again and tricks him into removing the poison before trapping him with the magical Jueqing Net. She subsequently meets Yang Jian and falls in love with him.

Longji eventually brings Yang Jian to the Yaochi Palace, where the Queen Mother discovers his connection to the Jade Emperor. Yang Jian is imprisoned in an ice pillar, and during the Peach Banquet the Queen Mother publicly reveals his identity. Longji remains present while Yang Jian is held at the banquet.

== Red Phoenix Star ==
In Chinese astrology, especially Zi Wei Dou Shu, the Red Phoenix Star (红鸾星) represents love and marriage, while the Heavenly Joy Star (天喜星) represents happy events and childbirth. The two stars are placed opposite each other in an astrological chart. The expression hongluan xing dong (红鸾星动, "the Red Phoenix Star moves") means that a person may soon fall in love or get married.

== Modern adaptations ==
Princess Longji has appeared in later adaptations and works based on Investiture of the Gods. A 2002 Chinese-language novel titled Longji Gongzhu (龍吉公主) by Ji Zhen reworks the relationship between Longji and Hong Jin as a romantic story.
