= Shen Gongbao =

Classical Chinese character

- 'Investiture of the Gods' character
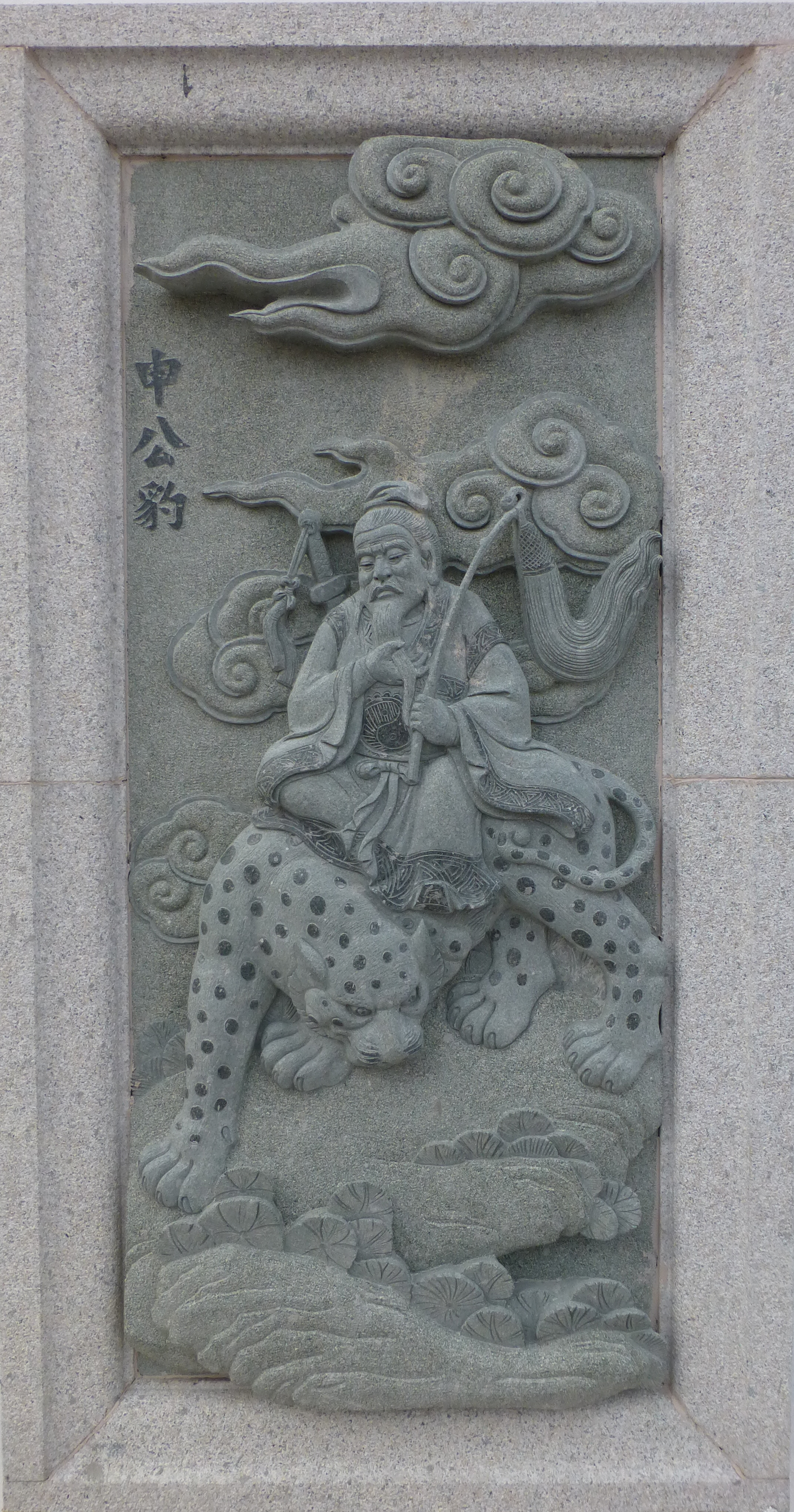
- Shen Gongbao, as depicted on a relief at Ping Sien Si Temple in Perak, Malaysia
- First appearance: "Chapter 37"
- Last appearance: "Chapter 99"
- Created by: Xu Zhonglin

In-universe information
- Full name: Shen Gongbao (申公豹)
- Gender: Male
- Title: General Who Divides the Waters of the Eastern Sea (东海分水将军)
- Occupation: Taoist practitioner
- Affiliation: Chan school
- Weapon: Ka Tian Pearl (开天珠)
- Home: Kunlun Mountains

Shen Gongbao (Chinese: 申公豹) is a major character in the Chinese novel Investiture of the Gods (Fengshen Yanyi). He is a disciple of Yuanshi Tianzun and a junior fellow apprentice of Jiang Ziya. After learning that Jiang Ziya had been chosen to assist the Zhou dynasty and carry out the investiture of the gods, Shen Gongbao turns against him and supports the Shang dynasty. He persuades various practitioners, including members of the Jiejiao, to oppose Jiang Ziya and the Zhou forces. He later breaks a promise made to Yuanshi Tianzun not to interfere with Jiang Ziya and is punished by being placed in the North Sea eye. At the end of the novel, he is included in the investiture and appointed the General Who Divides the Waters of the Eastern Sea (东海分水将军).

== In Fengshen Yanyi ==
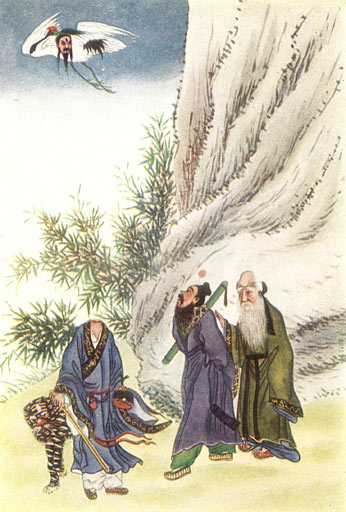
Shen Gongbao at Kunlun

Shen Gongbao first appears in chapter 37, when he visits Jiang Ziya on Kunlun Mountain and attempts to persuade him to abandon his mission to assist the Zhou forces. Shen Gongbao demonstrates a supernatural ability to remove his own head and later restore it to his body. Nanji Xianweng sends Baihe Tongzi to take away Shen Gongbao's head. Jiang Ziya subsequently asks Nanji Xianweng to return it, and Shen Gongbao survives.

After leaving Kunlun Mountain, Shen Gongbao opposes Jiang Ziya and supports King Zhou of Shang. He travels among various practitioners and persuades them to oppose Jiang Ziya and the Zhou forces. Among those whom he recruits or influences are members of the Jiejiao, as well as other supernatural figures who later fight against the Zhou army.

Shen Gongbao later confronts Jiang Ziya at Jiameng Pass. He initially gains the advantage, but Ju Liusun intervenes and captures him. Shen Gongbao promises Yuanshi Tianzun that he will no longer interfere with Jiang Ziya, but later breaks his promise and takes part in the Ten Thousand Immortals Formation. After the formation is defeated, Yuanshi Tianzun orders the Yellow Turban Strongmen to seize Shen Gongbao and place his body in the eye of the North Sea.

At the end of the novel, Shen Gongbao is included in Jiang Ziya's investiture and appointed General Who Divides the Waters of the Eastern Sea (东海分水将军).

== Interpretations ==
Bai Wei sees Shen Gongbao as a tragic character whose fate is caused by his own faults and the way he is written in the novel. She describes him as proud, jealous, and unwilling to forgive others. His name is also used to mock people who cause trouble. A Chinese saying, "Shen Gongbao's mouth—stirring up trouble" (申公豹的嘴——搬弄是非), refers to his habit of causing arguments.

== Worship ==
Shen Gongbao is worshipped as Shen Gongbao Bogong (申公豹伯公) at Jin Ling Temple (金嶺廟) in Asahan, Malacca, Malaysia.

An older account of Shen Gongbao worship appears in the Qing dynasty work Chaxiangshi Sichao (茶香室四鈔) by Yu Yue. It quotes Tang Yongzhong's Yijiong Baibian (翼駉稗編), which describes a shrine to Shen Gongbao near Kyakhta, on the border between China and Russia. Merchants prayed at the shrine before crossing the frozen waters of the North Sea, now known as Lake Baikal. They also placed a wooden statue of Shen Gongbao in the water to tell when the ice was safe to cross. In spring, the appearance of the statue above the ice was taken as a sign that the ice would soon break.

In Houyu Village, Gushan Town, Jin'an District, Fuzhou, Shen Gongbao is worshipped as the principal deity of the Aofeng Jing (鳌峰境) shrine. He is worshipped there under the title General Who Divides the Waters of the Eastern Sea (东海分水将军).

== Film and television ==
=== Chinese television ===
Year	English title	Chinese title	Actor	Notes
1990	The Investiture of the Gods	封神榜	Lei Changxi	
1999	The Legend of Ne Zha	莲花童子哪吒	Chen Tianwen	
2001	Gods of Honour	封神榜	Joseph Lee Kwok Lun	
2006	The Legend and the Hero	封神榜之凤鸣岐山	Miao Haizhong	
2009	The Legend and the Hero 2	封神榜之武王伐紂	Miao Haizhong	
2014	The Investiture of the Gods	封神英雄榜	Zhang Mingming	
2015	The Investiture of the Gods II	封神英雄	Zhang Mingming	
2019	Investiture Of the Gods	封神演義	Hai Yitian	

=== Chinese film ===
Year	English title	Chinese title	Actor	Notes
2016	League of Gods	3D封神榜	Louis Koo	
2019	Nezha	哪吒之魔童降世	Yang Wei	Voice
2020	Jiang Ziya	姜子牙	Tutehameng	Voice
2022	New Gods: Yang Jian	新神榜：杨戬	Yi Zhao	Voice
2022	Creation of the Gods I: Kingdom of Storms	封神第一部：朝歌风云	Xia Yu	
2025	Ne Zha 2	哪吒之魔童闹海	Yang Wei	Voice

=== Japanese television ===
Title	Japanese Title	Actor	Notes
Hoshin Engi	封神演義	Jun'ichi Kanemaru	
Hoshin Engi	封神演義	Haruhiko Jō	
Hoshin Engi	封神演義	Akira Ishida	
Hoshin Engi	封神演義	Kenyu Horiuchi	
