= Jinling Shengmu =

Taoist deity and character in the 16th-century Chinese novel

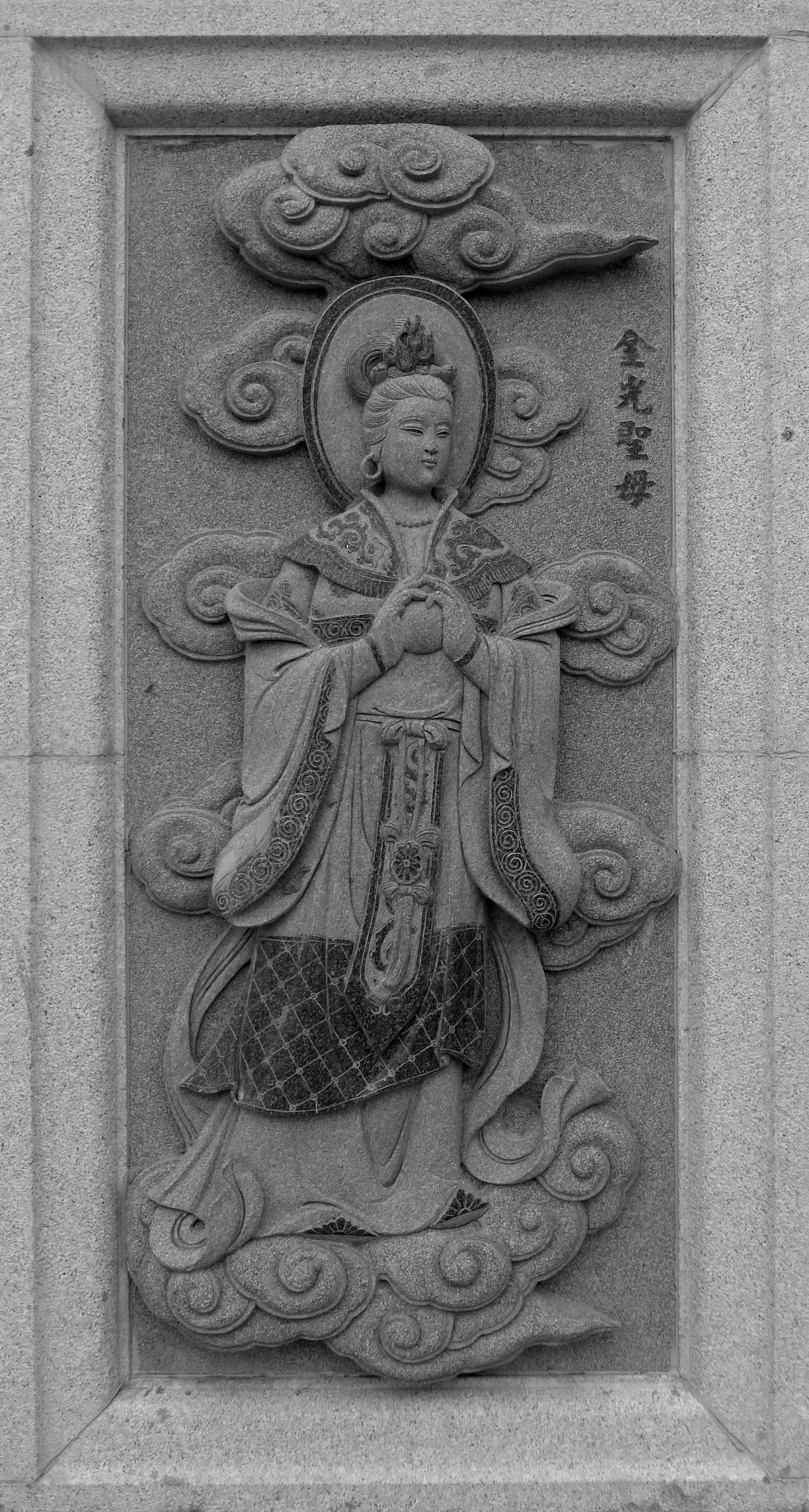
Jinling Shengmu

Jinling Shengmu (simplified Chinese: 金灵圣母; traditional Chinese: 金靈聖母; pinyin: Jīnlíng Shèngmǔ; lit. 'Saint Mother (of) Golden Spirit') is a character in the 16th-century Chinese novel, Fengshen Yanyi, which is also known as The Investiture of the Gods. She is a powerful immortal of the Jie sect, being one of the four chief disciples of its leader, Tongtian Jiaozhu.

== In Fengshen Yanyi ==
In the novel, Jinling Shengmu is one of the four chief disciples of Tongtian Jiaozhu. Her own disciples included the high-ranking Grand Tutor of the Shang Dynasty, Wen Zhong, and Yu Yuan. She was highly respected within the Jie sect for her deep cultivation and formidable power, which was said to surpass even that of the Twelve Golden Immortals of the rival Chan sect.

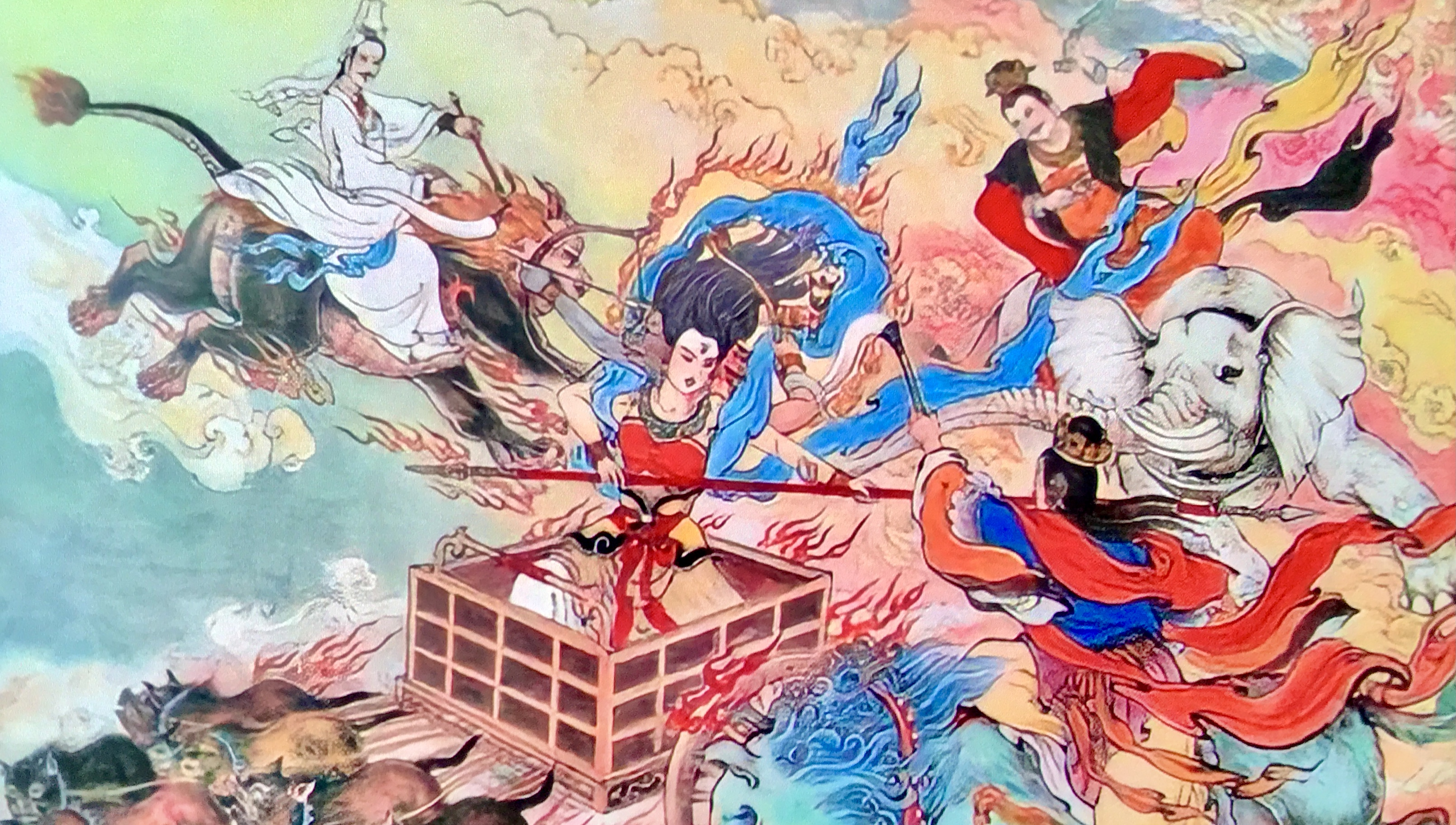
The battle between Jinling Shengmu and the three great immortals

During the Battle of the Ten Thousand Immortals, she defeated Princess Longji and Hong Jin. She faced off against the three great immortals: Wenshu Guangfa Tianzun, Puxian Zhenren, and Cihang Zhenren. Despite their combined efforts, Jinling Shengmu overpowered them, forcing them to retreat. However, her victory was short-lived. As she pursued the fleeing immortals, she was ambushed by Randeng Daoren, a senior member of the Chan sect. He struck her down from behind with his powerful magical weapon, the Dinghai Shenzhu (定海神珠; Sea-Calming Divine Pearl), killing her instantly.

Following her death, Jiang Ziya, the orchestrator of the investiture of the gods, canonized Jinling Shengmu with a high celestial position. She was appointed as Kangong Doumu, the primordial Mother Goddess of the Big Dipper. In this exalted role, she resides in the Dou Mansion (斗府) and holds dominion over all stars and constellations. She is said to command 84,000 stars and celestial spirits, a role that places her at the head of all heavenly bodies and among the most revered deities in the Daoist pantheon described in the novel. In the esoteric teachings of Taoism, she is identified as the same as Doumu.

== Interpretations ==
Dong Jiangbo, a literary critic and editor of Beijing Daily, described Jinling Shengmu as the strongest female warrior in Investiture of the Gods. He noted that she is portrayed as having attained the realm of “All Things are Severed,” where her strikes not only destroyed physical forms but also cut through the karmic roots of cultivation, a power said to be beyond the comprehension of Great Luo immortals. He further observed that her “Star-Flow Coordination Method” was later adopted as a core tactic of the Heavenly Court, influencing formations such as Wen Zhong’s Twenty-Four Heavenly Lords of Thunder.

== Worship ==
Jinling Shengmu is one of the principal deities in the village of Molangfang in Haidong, Tian Dalishi. She is venerated as the goddess of fertility in this village, and her attire is adorned with myriad characters. Scholars consider these characters to be a clear symbol of fertility, signifying the community's prayers for abundant and prosperous life.
