= Wenshu Guangfa Tianzun =

Taoist form of Manjusri

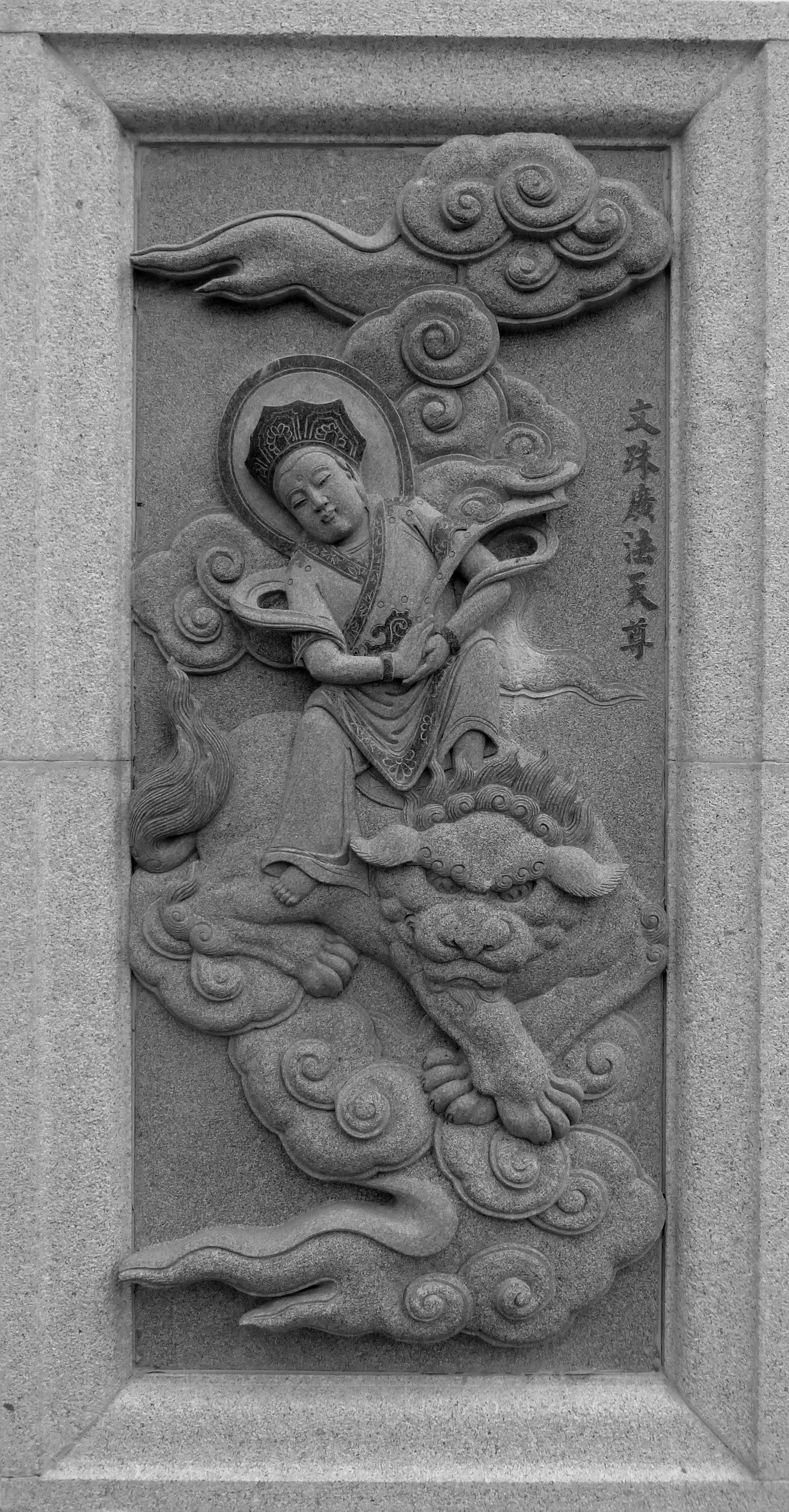
Wenshu Guangfa Tianzun

Wenshu Guangfa Tianzun (simplified Chinese: 文殊广法天尊; traditional Chinese: 文殊廣法天尊; pinyin: Wénshū Guǎngfǎ Tiānzūn) is a Taoist immortal and character in the Chinese novel Investiture of the Gods (Fengshen Yanyi). He is a disciple of Yuanshi Tianzun, one of the Twelve Golden Immortals, and the teacher of Jinzha. He lives at Cloud-Top Cave (云霄洞) on Wulong Mountain (五龙山).

Wenshu Guangfa Tianzun identifies with Manjusri Bodhisattva. Some religious sources likewise identify the character with Manjusri, while others such as Qunxian Xianpo Tianmen distinguish the Taoist character from the Buddhist bodhisattva. It is believed that Manjusri Bodhisattva transformed into Wenshu Guangfa Tianzun, one of the protectors in Taoism, helping to resolve religious conflicts common in the Western regions.

== In Fengshen Yanyi ==
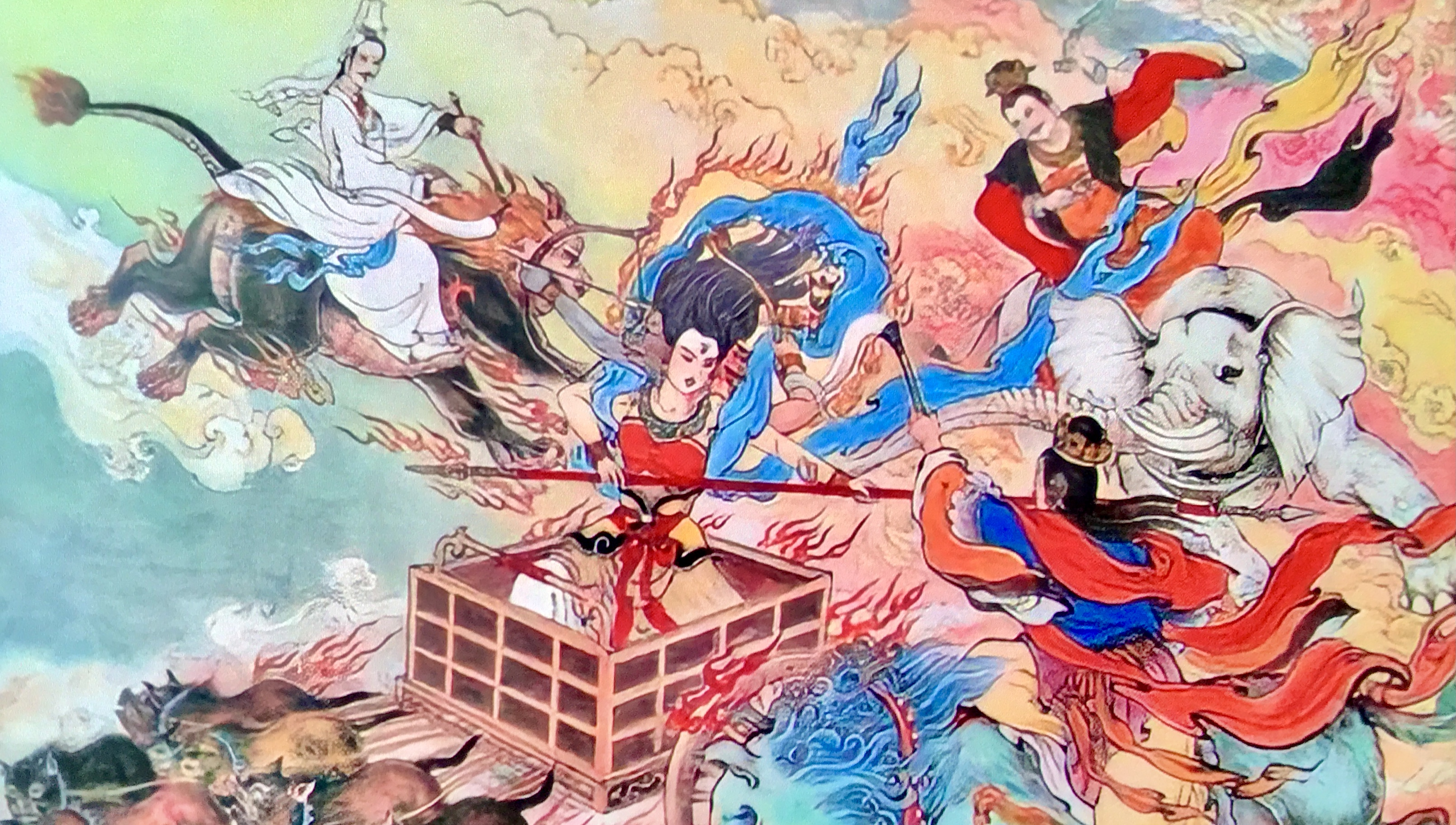
The battle between Wenshu Guangfa Tianzun, Puxian Zhenren, and Cihang Daoren against Jinling Shengmu

Wenshu Guangfa Tianzun lives at Cloud-Top Cave (云霄洞) on Wulong Mountain (五龙山). When Li Jing seeks refuge there after his conflict with Nezha, Nezha follows him and attacks Wenshu Guangfa Tianzun. Wenshu uses the Dulong Pillar (遁龙桩) to restrain Nezha with three golden rings and orders his disciple Jinzha to punish him. Taiyi Zhenren later arrives and explains that the conflict between Li Jing and Nezha was part of a test for Nezha.

Later, Wenshu Guangfa Tianzun comes to the aid of Jiang Ziya when Wang Mo attacks him. He uses the Dulong Pillar to restrain Wang Mo, allowing Jinzha to kill him. Wenshu then gives Jiang Ziya medicine and sends Jinzha with him to assist the Zhou forces.

During the campaign against the Ten Absolute Formations (十绝阵), Wenshu Guangfa Tianzun is ordered to break the Tianjue Formation (天绝阵). He enters the formation on lotus flowers and uses the Dulong Pillar to restrain Qin Wan, whom he then kills with his sword.

Wenshu Guangfa Tianzun is later captured with the other Twelve Golden Immortals by Yunxiao Niangniang, Qiongxiao Niangniang, and Bixiao Niangniang and imprisoned in the Nine-Curves Yellow River Formation (九曲黄河阵). The formation causes the immortals to lose their cultivation.

During the Battle of the Myriad Immortal Formation (万仙阵), Wenshu Guangfa Tianzun fights Qianshou Xian (虬首仙). He captures him and restores him to his original form as a blue-haired lion. Yuanshi Tianzun orders the lion to become Wenshu Guangfa Tianzun's mount.

Wenshu Guangfa Tianzun later fights alongside Puxian Zhenren and Cihang Daoren at the Myriad Immortal Formation. The three are referred to in the novel as the “three great masters” (三大士). Wenshu rides the blue-haired lion, Puxian rides a white elephant, and Cihang rides a golden-haired hou.The novel later states that Wenshu Guangfa Tianzun becomes Manjusri Bodhisattva.

== Interpretations ==
Wenshu Guangfa Tianzun is based on the Buddhist bodhisattva Mañjuśrī. Japanese scholar Yoshihiro Nikaido argues that most of the Buddhist figures in Fengshen Yanyi came from the Shenxian Tongjian (神仙通鉴). He includes Wenshu Guangfa Tianzun, Puxian Zhenren, Cihang Daoren, Randeng Daoren, Jieyin Daoren, and Weihu in his study. He also compares Wenshu's disciple Jinzha with Mañjuśrī's attendant in the Shenxian Tongjian.

Wenshu's blue lion is another link to Mañjuśrī, who is traditionally shown riding a lion. Nikaido also compares Puxian Zhenren's white elephant with the mount of Samantabhadra. Satoshi Ninomiya finds further Buddhist features in Wenshu's magical weapon, the Dunlong Zhuang (遁龙桩), also called the Seven-Treasure Golden Lotus (七宝金莲), and in his meeting with Zhunti Daoren.

== Temple ==
At Qingyang Palace (青羊宫) in Chengdu, Sichuan, the Sanqing Hall (三清殿) contains statues of the Twelve Golden Immortals, including Wenshu Guangfa Tianzun. The hall's principal statues are the Three Pure Ones.

At Louguantai (楼观台) in Shaanxi, the Jiuku Hall (救苦殿) has Taiyi Jiuku Tianzun as its principal deity, with Wenshu Guangfa Tianzun on the left and Puxian Zhenren on the right. The hall also contains statues of the Ten Directions Responding Deities (十方应化天尊).

In Hong Kong, the Daoist religious hall Shengshan Zhentang (省善真堂) has enshrined Wenshu Guangfa Tianzun since its establishment in 1952. The hall's founding account states that it established an altar dedicated to Taishang Laojun, Wenshu Guangfa Tianzun, Li Tieguai, and Lü Dongbin.

At San Yuan Daoist Temple (三元道观), the Sanqing Hall contains statues of the Twelve Golden Immortals. A description of the hall lists Wenshu Guangfa Tianzun among them, together with Guangchengzi, Chijingzi, Huanglong Zhenren, Júlíusūn, Puxian Zhenren, and other immortals.
