= Cihang Daoren =

Taoist figure of Guanyin

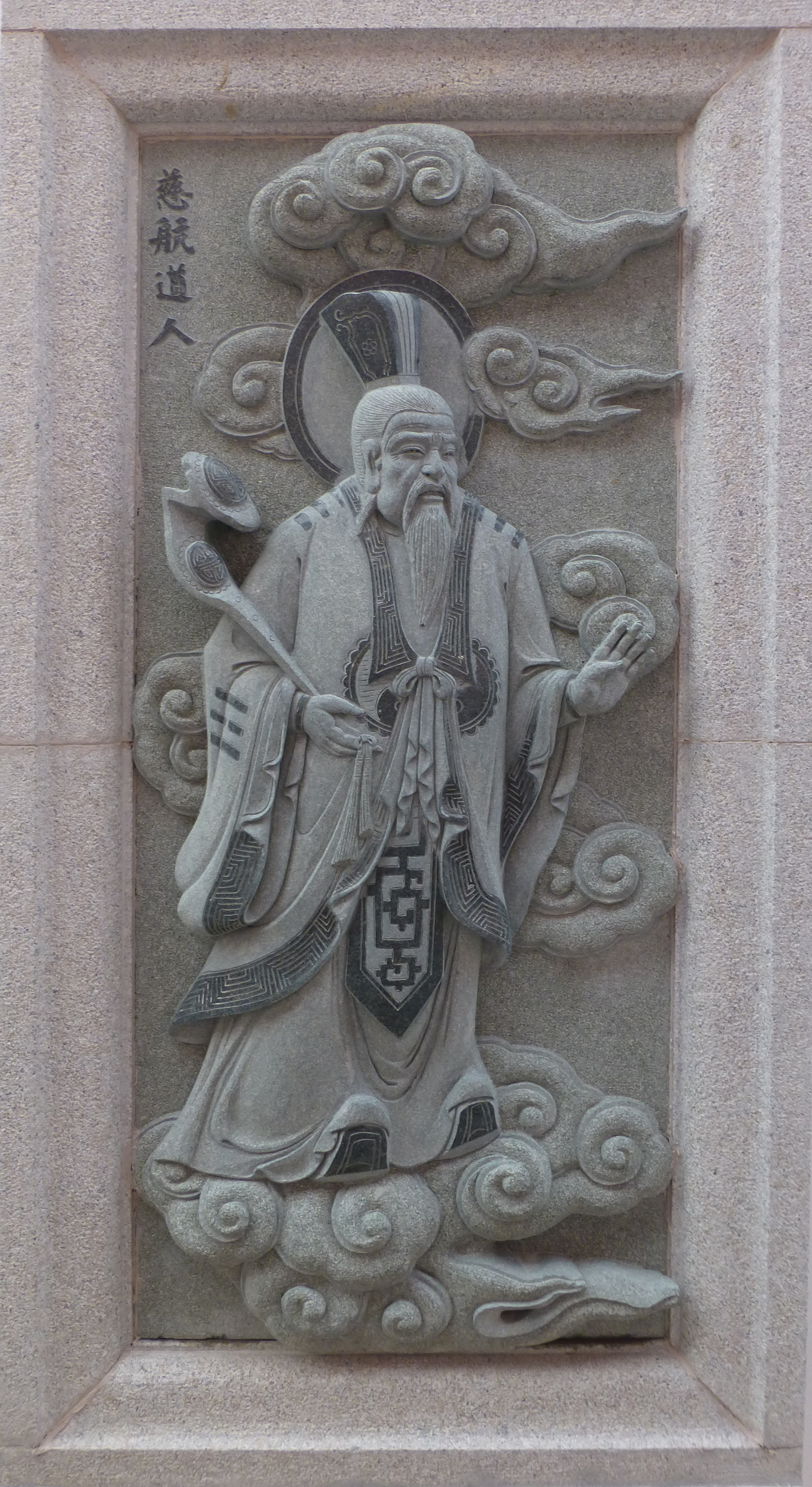
Relief of Cihang Daoren

Cihang Daoren (Chinese: 慈航真人; pinyin: Cíháng Dàorén; Wade–Giles: Tz'u-hang Chen-jen; lit. 'Compassion Travel/Navigate True-Person/Perfected-Person') is a Daoist deity and character in the classic Chinese novel Investiture of the Gods (more commonly known as Fengshen Yanyi). He is a disciple of Yuanshi Tianzun and one of the Three Great Immortals, holding the ninth position among the Twelve Golden Immortals.

The character is believed to be derived from the Buddhist bodhisattva Guanyin. Chinese scholars generally believe that Cihang Daoren is the origin of Guanyin's male form and that the transition of Guanyin from male to female occurred during the Northern and Southern Dynasties period. The figure appears in works such as the Lingbao Sutra, the Romance of the Immortals of the Past Dynasties and Fengshen Yanyi. Scholars after the Tang dynasty advocated for the concept of 'Three Religions in One', which led to the gradual merging of the Taoist deity Cihang Daoren with Guanyin Bodhisattva. Folk depictions often portray this god riding a dragon, tortoise, serpent, giant turtle, or even a single log canoe due to the term 'Cihang'.

== In literature ==
Cihang Daoren first appeared in the early Daoist scripture known as the Lingbao Sutra, which is believed to have been composed around the years 397-402 AD. However, due to the loss of the original scripture, the existing Daoist collections of the Lingbao Sutra no longer contain the original text regarding Cihang Daoren.

In the Romance of the Immortals of the Past Dynasties, it is recorded that "In the Chaoyin Cave of Mount Putuo, there is a Daoist. It is said that during the time of the Shang dynasty, he cultivated Dao here and attained supernatural abilities. He vowed to universally save both men and women. He has used elixirs and sweet dew to benefit people, and people in the South China Sea call him the Great Compassionate Master, Cihang Dashi."

In the most widely circulated folk version, there is a legend of Princess Miaoshan cultivating on Mount Xiang in parallel with a Taoist scripture, the "Yuanshi Tianzun Speaks the Inspired Guanyin Sutra" (元始天尊说灵感观音妙经). This scripture succinctly narrates the deeds of Princess Miaoshan's cultivation on Mount Xiang, similar to the popular folk legend. In this classic text, she is referred to as the 'Heavenly Lord of Biluodong' (碧落洞天帝主) and the 'Heavenly Lord of Universal Liberation and Freedom' (圆通自在天尊).

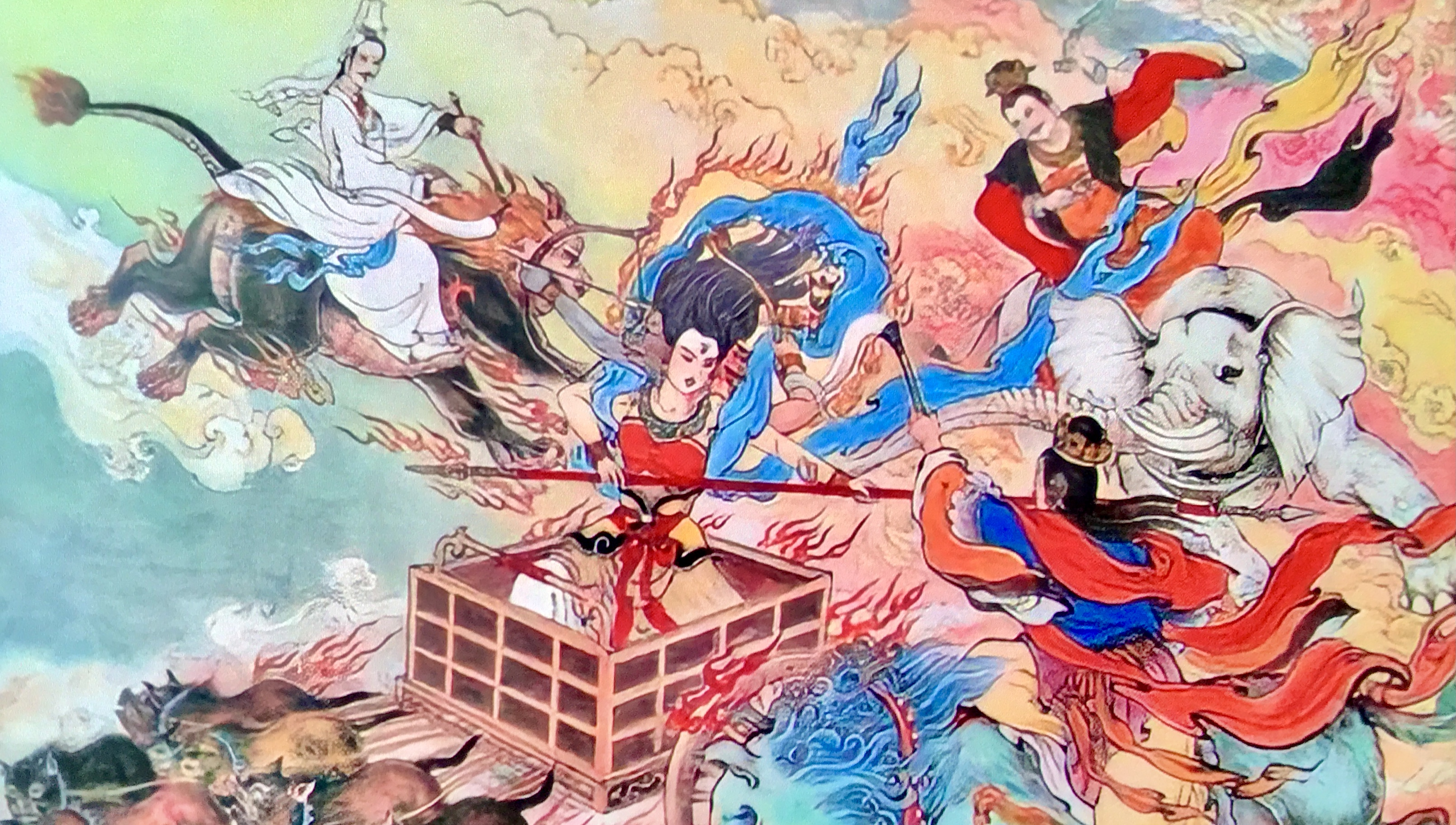
The battle between the Three Great Immortals and Jinling Shengmu

In Fengshen Yanyi, Cihang Daoren is the superiorman over Luojia Cave in Mount Putuo and ninth of the twelve disciples of Yuanshi Tianzun. The goddess Nuwa taught him the art of Thousand Hands and Thousand Eyes and guided him to become a disciple of Yuanshi Tianzun. Yuanshi Tianzun taught Cihang the celestial book Daode Heart Sutra of Daode Tianzun and asked him to practice Taoism on Mount Putuo to become an immortal, known as the 'Thousand-Handed Divine Immortal'. To spread Taoism widely, he traveled to the West and later returned to assist King Wu in his campaign against King Zhou. During the Battle of the Ten Thousand Immortals, alongside Wenshu Guangfa Tianzun and Puxian Zhenren, he faced off against the formidable disciple of the Jie Sect, Jinling Shengmu. He achieved significant feats, including breaking the Wind Roaring Formation and defeating Dong Tianjun, battling Han Zhixian and shattering the Wind Bag Formation, and breaking the Four Symbols Formation to capture Jin Guangxian. In the end, among the disciples of the Chan Sect and the Jie Sect, those with the highest level of Dao cultivation ascended to become deities upon entering the Register of Deities, while those with lesser cultivation entered as divine beings or immortals, and those with lower levels of cultivation were reborn in the cycle of reincarnation. Some disciples also joined Western Buddhism, including the Chan Sect's Cihang Daoren (later known as Guanyin), Wenshu Guangfa Tianzun (later known as Manjushri), and Puxian Zhenren (later known as Samantabhadra).

== Temple ==
Located in the southwestern suburb of Chengdu, Sanqing Hall within Qingyang Palace is a temple dedicated to the supreme Taoist god Sanqing. In the center of the hall sits a statue of Sanqing, and on both sides of the hall are the disciples of Sanqing, including the Twelve Golden Immortals, including Cihang Daoren. This historical temple traces its origins back to the Tang dynasty and underwent significant reconstruction during the Kangxi period of the Qing dynasty. The foundation of Sanqing Hall takes the form of a square, covering a total area of 1,600 square meters.

In some Daoist temples, under the statute of Cihang Daoren, there is usually a golden lion with eight additional smaller heads, which is known as the Nine-Headed Golden Lion. It is said that the Immortal Cihang Daoren can appear in the human realm in 32 different human forms (三十二应), some of which are male and others female.

There are three anniversaries of Cihang Daoren that have been celebrated. The first is on the nineteenth day of the Flower Moon (Lunar Second Month). This was the day Cihang Daoren prayed for the dead to be liberated from hell and blessings for the living (other legends say it was his birthday). The second is on the nineteenth day of the Lychee Moon (Lunar Sixth Month). This was the day he subjugated Ningbo Xianzi (a sea spirit that caused maritime disasters) and successfully gained enlightenment. The third is on the nineteenth day of the Chrysanthemum Moon (Lunar Ninth Month). This was the day Cihang Daoren achieved immortality.
