= Mount Lao =

Taoist mountain in Shandong, China

- Laoshan
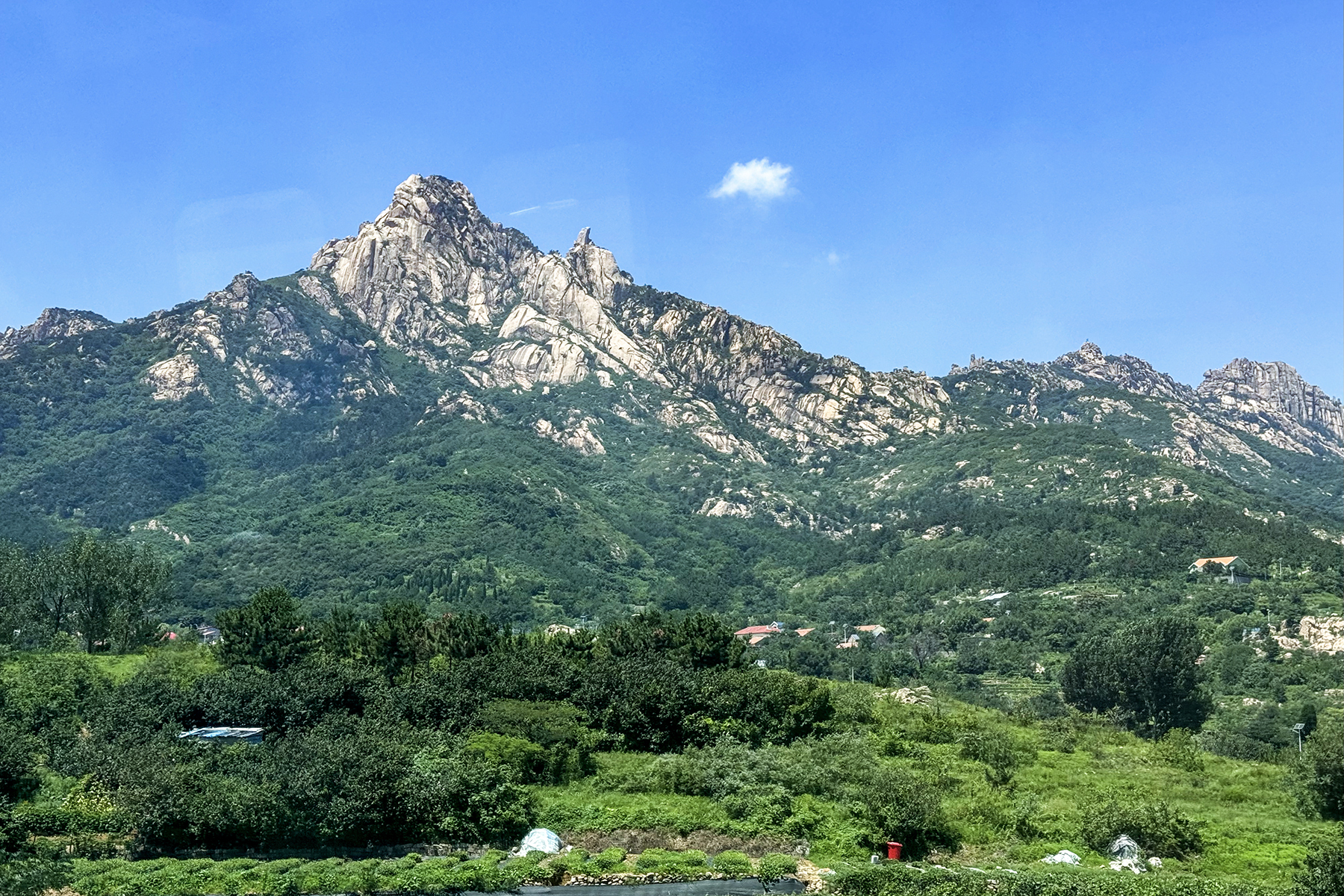
- View of Mount Lao from within the Laoshan National Park.

Highest point
- Elevation: 1,132.7 m (3,716 ft)
- Coordinates: 36°11′30″N 120°35′30″E

Geography
- Location within Qingdao Location within Northern China Location within China
- Location: Qingdao, Shandong Province, China

Mount Lao

Chinese name
- Simplified Chinese: 崂山
- Traditional Chinese: 嶗山
Transcriptions
Standard Mandarin
- Hanyu Pinyin: Láoshān

German name
- German: Lauschan

Mount Lao, or Laoshan (German: Lauschan; simplified Chinese: 崂山; traditional Chinese: 嶗山; pinyin: Láo Shān), is a mountain located near the East China Sea on the southeastern coastline of the Shandong Peninsula in China. The mountain is culturally significant due to its long affiliation with Taoism and is often regarded as one of the "cradles of Taoism". It is the highest coastal mountain in China and the second highest mountain in Shandong, with the highest peak (Jufeng) reaching 1,132.7 metres (3,716 ft). The mountain lies about 30 kilometres (19 mi) to the northeast of the downtown area of the city of Qingdao and is protected by the Qingdao Laoshan National Park that covers an area of 446 square kilometres.

== Geology ==
Mount Lao consists of granite. The mountain's landforms were formed due to the action of glaciers during the Quaternary and erosion by meltwater released from the icecap that covered a large portion of Shandong during the late Pleistocene.

== History ==
Laoshan is known as one of the birthplaces of Taoism. It is the place where the Complete Perfection School of Taoism (Chinese: 全真; pinyin: Quánzhēn) developed. In 412 CE the Chinese Buddhist pilgrim Faxian landed near Laoshan on his return from India. In the course of history, the mountain has been known by various other names, which includes different spellings of "Laoshan" (劳山, 牢山) as well as entirely different names such as Mount Futang and Mount Ao (鰲山). The latter name was used by the Taoist Master Changchun who served as the top religious affairs official to Genghis Khan.

== Sites ==
In the course of history, numerous palaces, Taoist temples, and nunneries have been constructed on Mount Lao. At the peak of Taoist worship, Mount Lao was home to about 1000 monks and nuns. However, many of these structures have not survived to the present. Major sites on Mount Lao are:

=== Temple of Supreme Purity ===
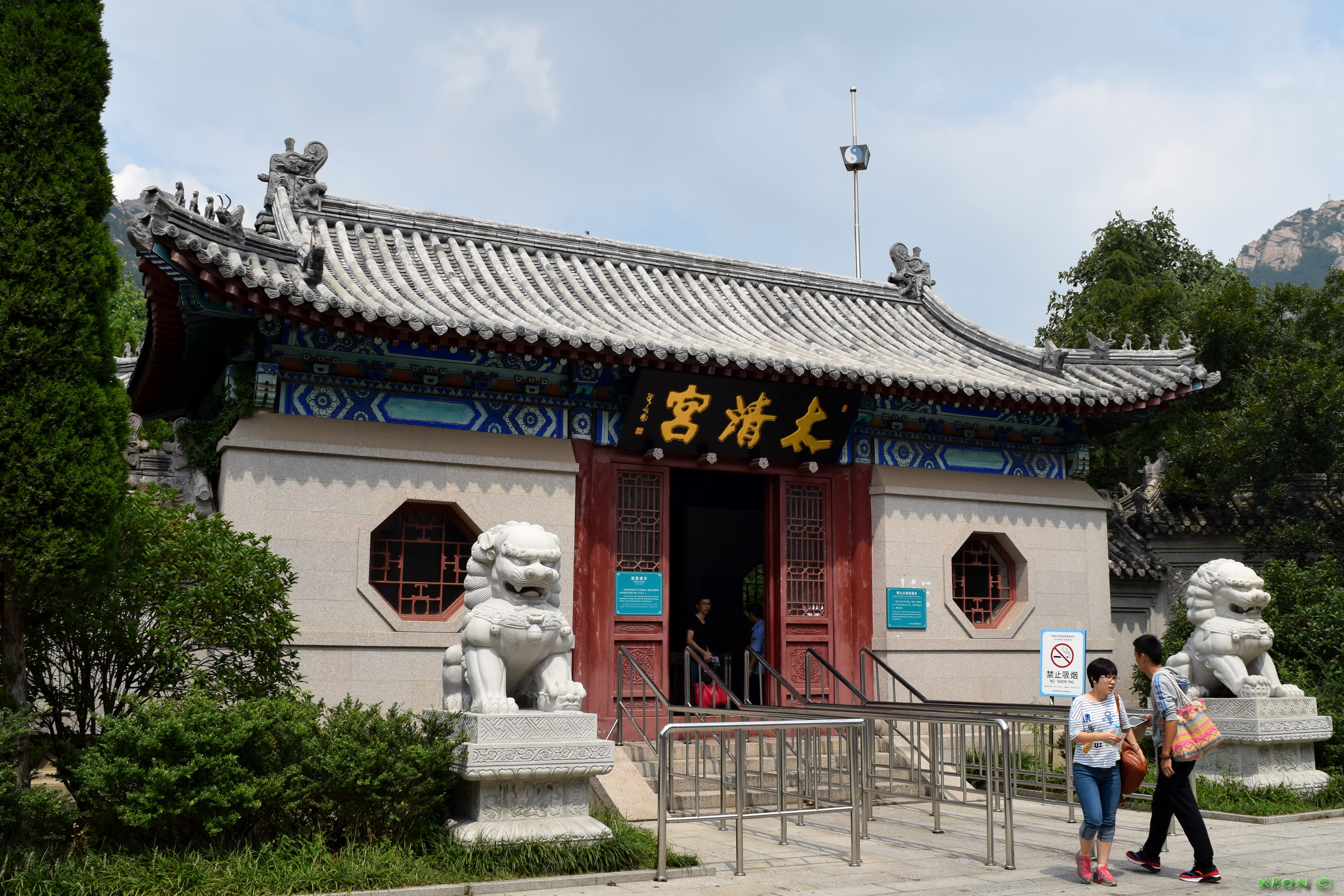
Temple of Supreme Purity

The largest temple complex on Mount Lao is that of the Temple of Supreme Purity (Chinese: 太清宮; pinyin: Tàiqīng Gōng; lit. 'Supreme Purity Palace'), a Taoist temple that was first built during the Northern Song dynasty with the present structures dating to the reign of the Wanli Emperor in the Ming dynasty. The temple is located near the coast, below Pantao Peak on the southeastern foot of Mount Lao and is hence also known as the Lower Temple (Chinese: 下宮; pinyin: Xià Gōng), The main structure of the temple is the Hall of the Three Pure Ones (Chinese: 三清馆; pinyin: Sānqīng Guǎn) which houses statues of the Taoist Trinity (the Grand Pure One, the Supreme Pure One, the Jade Pure One). It is flanked by the Three Emperors Hall (to the left, Chinese: 三皇馆; pinyin: Sānhuáng Guǎn) and the Three Officials Hall (to the left, Chinese: 三官店; pinyin: Sānguān Diàn). The Three Emperors Hall enshrines statues of Fuxi, Shennong, and the Yellow Emperor. In the Three Officials Halls are the statues of the Three Gods (the God of Heaven, the God of Earth, and the God of Water) along with other statues, such as of the warrior god Xuan Wu and of Lei Gong, the God of Thunder. Two ancient Cypress trees in front of the Three Emperors Hall are said to have been planted during the Han dynasty. Two old camellia trees are standing in front of the Three Officials Hall. On the walls outside of the Three Emperors Hall is displayed an imperial decree by Genghis Khan granting Taoism protection. A natural feature on the grounds of the temple is the Shenshui (Immortal Water) Spring that is fed by Mount Lao's considerable underground waters. The Qing dynasty writer Pu Songling is said to have resided in the Temple of Supreme Purity in his later years. His stories "The Taoist Priest of Laoshan" (Chinese: 崂山道士; pinyin: Láoshān Dàoshì) and "The Flower Nymphs" (Chinese: 香玉; pinyin: Xiāngyù) from the collection Strange Stories from a Chinese Studio are set on Mount Lao with the latter story specifically referring to peonies and camellias in the Temple of Supreme Purity.

=== Temple of Great Purity ===
The Temple of Great Purity (Chinese: 上清宮; pinyin: Shàngqīng Gōng) also known as the Upper Temple (Chinese: 上宮; pinyin: Shàng Gōng) is located on the southeastern slope of Mount Lao above the Temple of Supreme Purity. It was established during the Song dynasty and rebuilt during the Yuan dynasty, in the years 1297 to 1307. It is one of the oldest extant structures on Mount Lao. Like the Temple of Supreme Purity, the Temple of Great Purity features a spring. The spring in the Temple of Great Purity is called the "Shengshuiyang (Ocean of Holy Water) Spring".

=== Longtan Waterfall ===
The Longtan Waterfall (Chinese: 龙潭瀑; pinyin: Lóngtán Pù) has a height of about 20 metres and is located to the south of the Temple of Great Purity.

=== Temple of Supreme Peace ===
The Temple of Supreme Peace (Chinese: 太平宮; pinyin: Tàipíng Gōng) is located on the northern slope of Mount Lao. It was established during the Song dynasty, but has been rebuilt several times.

=== Hualou Temple ===
The Hualou Temple (Chinese: 华楼宮; pinyin: Huálóu Gōng) was established by the Taoist Liu Zhijian during the Yuan dynasty (in 1325) and subsequently rebuilt during the Ming and Qing dynasties, as well as during the Republican era.

=== Huayan Temple ===
The Huayan Temple (Chinese: 华严寺; pinyin: Huáyán Sì) is the only Buddhist temple on Mount Lao and is located on the eastern slope of the mountain.

== Twelve Sceneries ==
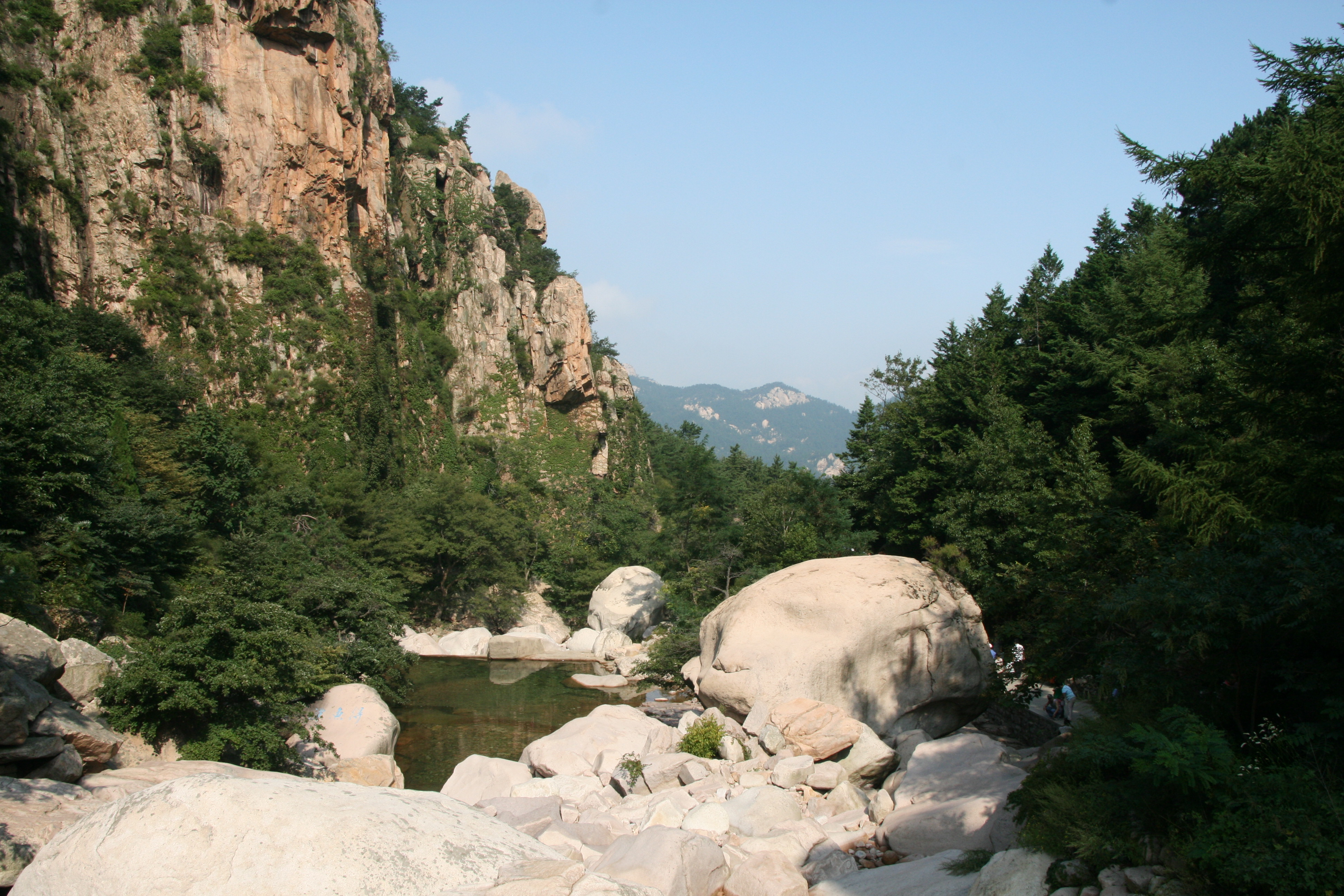
Beijiushui

Traditionally, 12 sceneries (Chinese: 崂山十二景; pinyin: Láoshān Shí'èrjǐng) on Mount Lao have been regarded as particularly beautiful:

1. Mingxia Sanyi (明霞散绮, rays of sunshine)
2. Weizhu Mingquan (尉竹鸣泉, spring with sound)
3. Yundong Pansong (云洞蟠松, pine tree on the rock)
4. Yanpu Chaoyin (岩瀑潮音, waterfall with sound of tide)
5. Qipan Xian Yi (棋盘仙弈, megalith at Qipan)
6. Hualou Dieshi (华楼叠石, various stones)
7. Shiling Hengyun (狮岭横云, clouds hung on the top of the peak)
8. Naluoyanku (那罗延窟, rock cave)
9. Haiqiao Xiandun (海峤仙墩, seaside cliffs)
10. Taiqing Suiyue (太清水月, bright moon in spring water of Taiqing Palace)
11. Longtan Penyu (龙潭喷雨, water flowing out of the dragon pool)
12. Jufeng Xuzhao (巨峰旭照, rising sun in the morning on the highest peak)

== Culture ==
Mount Lao is featured in many legends and local traditions. For example, the mountain is said to have been visited by the emperor Qin Shi Huang and Emperor Wu of Han, both hoping to meet immortals and gain immortality there.

The martial arts style of the Northern Praying Mantis is attributed to Wang Lang, who is said to have developed while living on Mount Lao. Wang Lang is commemorated by a contemporary stone statue on the mountain.

Many gamblers visit Mount Lao for the famous tree located in the mountain, as it is said that three pats of the tree's trunk will bring instant luck for those seeking money.

The beer of the Tsingtao Brewery is brewed with Laoshan spring water.

Mount Lao is also famous for its green tea.

== Tourism ==
Laoshan is a popular tourist site with a 5A government rating. During the 2012 Golden Week, it received about 176,000 visitors. There are six designated scenic areas on Mount Lao: Taiqing (太清景区), Chessboard Stone (棋盘石景区), Yangkou (仰口景区), Jufeng (巨峰景区), Beijiushui (北九水景区), and Hualou (华楼景区).
