= Daojiao fushi =

Dress code of Taoist devotees and practitioners

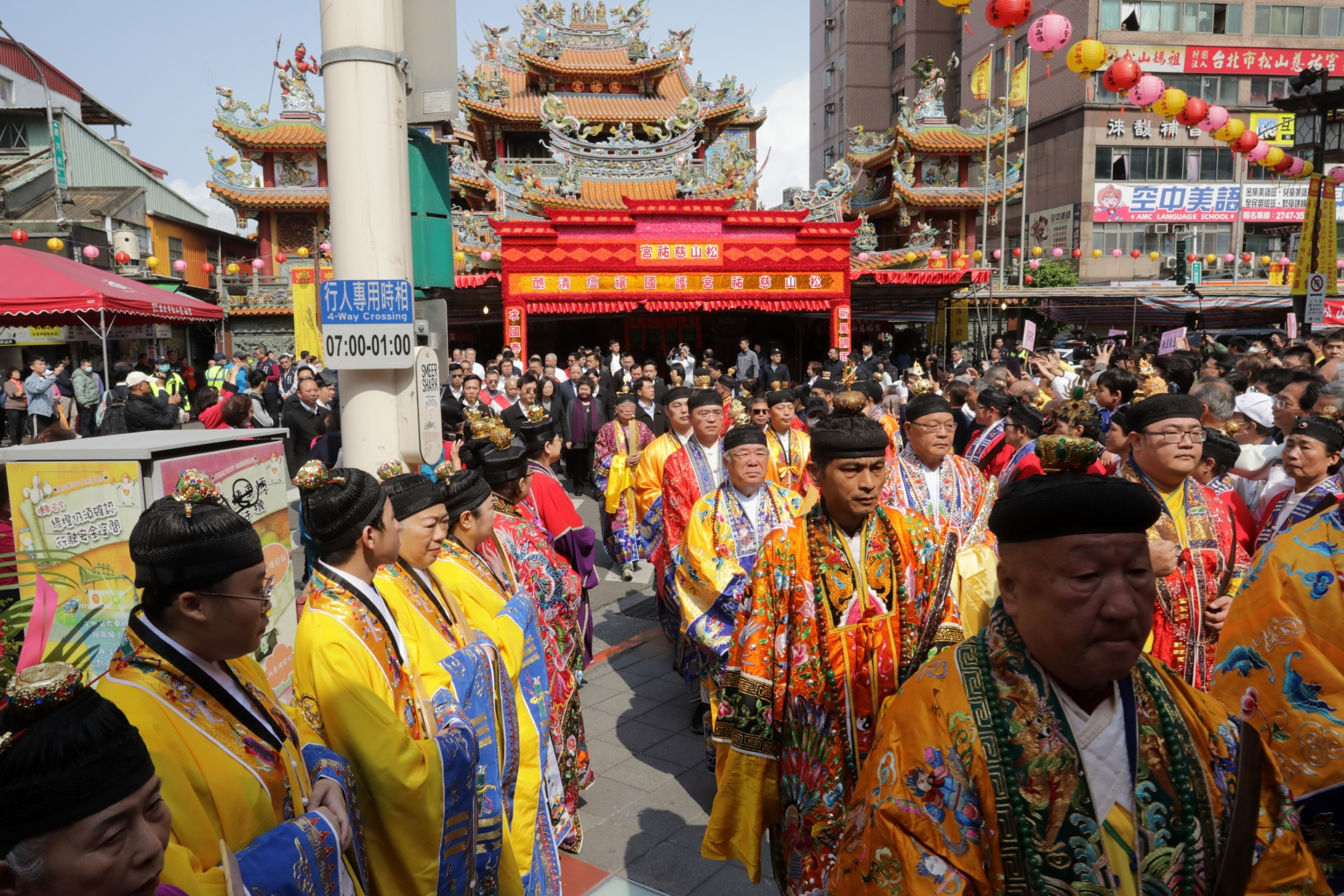

Chinese name
- Traditional Chinese: 道教服飾
- Simplified Chinese: 道教服饰
Transcriptions
Standard Mandarin
- Hanyu Pinyin: Dàojiàofúshì

English name
- English: Taoist clothing/ Taoist costumes/ Costume of Taoism

Daojiao fushi (simplified Chinese: 道教服饰; traditional Chinese: 道教服飾; pinyin: Dàojiàofúshì), also known as dàoyī (道衣; 'Taoist clothing'), are religious clothes worn by practitioners of Taoism, an indigenous religion and philosophy in China. This ritual clothing (冠服; guānfú) is both an important sign of proper etiquette in Chinese culture and a visible marker of the Taoist identity. This clothing worn by the Taoist priests are descended from the Han Chinese traditional clothing. When performing important rituals, Taoist priests wear ceremonial attire that thematically aligns with elements of Chinese cosmology. Different forms of clothing will be worn by Taoist priests in accordance to ritual types, and obvious distinctions are found in the attire of Taoist priests based on their different positions. There were also codes which would stipulate the appropriate Taoist attire to be worn during both ritual performance and when off duty.

== Cultural significance ==
Taoist clothing is a visible marker of Taoist identity. Ritual clothing not only inherits from Han Chinese Hanfu but also show clear Taoist cultural meaning. The decoration found on the clothes are deeply influenced by Chinese culture. These designs reflect traditional Taoist cosmology including Taoist pantheon (e.g. Yudi, the Sanqing, Yuanshi Tianzun, Lingbao Tianzun, Daode Tianzun who is the deified Laozi), the Eight Immortals: the Eight Trigrams, the Twenty-eight Lunar Mansions and the 12 animals of the Chinese zodiac. (Note: Depictions of the Taoist pantheon, Eight Immortals, Eight trigrams, the Twenty-eight Lunar Mansions and the 12 animals of the Chinese zodiac were characteristics designs of the Ming and Qing dynasties.) They can also be decorated with animals which are related to Chinese mythology, legends and stories, such as the crane bird which represents transcendence. They can also be decorated with auspicious symbols, such as dragons, butterflies, bats, clouds.

== History ==
=== Ancient ===
An explanation to the origins of dàoyī might be derived from robes worn by zhòuyī (咒醫; "ritual healers") and fangshi in ancient China. Both are embroidered with patterns of flowing clouds, depictions of the celestial realm, and the underworld. Another hypothesis is that the Taoist ritual clothing was a marker of various ranks of priestly attainments, similar to the formal clothing system used in ancient China to identify the members of the nobility and the senior bureaucracy.

According to the Taoist tradition, the ritual clothing originated since the era of Yellow Emperor; according to the legend, one day the Yellow Emperor saw a deity dressed in golden robe adorned with colourful clouds and a golden crown. To thank the deity for protecting the world, the Yellow Emperor designed the Taoist ritual dress based on the deity and reasoned that these heavenly clothing would be the most appropriate attire to wear when approaching the heavens during prayers. Therefore, the Daoshi (Taoist priests) wear the attire of the gods.

=== Northern and Southern dynasties ===
Taoist traditions were systematized during the Six dynasties period. Early taoist clothing were not fully developed and it is the Northern and Southern dynasties that the preliminary Taoist dress code was formed. Since the Liu Song period during the Southern dynasties, Lu Xiujing began to reinterpret the doctrine of Taoist's doctrine of adaptation to the social hierarchical system by basing himself on the ancient Chinese crown and dress system and by combining the religious needs, thus developing a new attire system. This system became the earliest systematic dress code of Taoist clothing. In the Lishizhenxiantidaotongjian (历世真仙体道通鉴), it is described that "Xiujing's Taoist dress is very beautiful, like the moon and star, like the rainbow and flower". Since then, the dress code of the Taoist clothing continued to develop until it included different styles, patterns, and colours based on different status and occasions. Many variety of Taoist ritual clothing were also described when Taoist clothing was systematized.

=== Song dynasty ===
There were many forms of Taoist priest clothing in the Song dynasty. In the early Southern Song, a style of Taoist priest robe is described as: "the broader silk braid of the Taoist priest robe was seen as more stylish, with the breadth being about three to four cun, and the length more than two zhang, so that that dress made of silk velvet could be wrapped back and forth around the wearer's waist several times".Another form of Taoist priest was the Hechang (lit. "Crane robe") which was made of twisted and woven feathers; it was a symbolism of immortality and ascendance to the Heaven. Cheng Dachang from the Southern Song dynasty also observed that "[...] the clothes worn by Taoist priests of the current times are slightly different from the fur coat. The lower parts of the fur coat are crossed and overlapped while those of the Taoist priest robe hang straight down". (Note: Cheng Dachang also described the "fur coat" as having an inclined collar and being crossed lapels which is similar to the long beizi found in his time (i.e. in Southern Song), the fur coat is however different from the beizi as the back and front of the fur coat are connected under the armpits while the beizi are unconnected.) In The Current Regression of Diet and Apparel by Shi Shengzu, it was observed that the "apparel system of the three ancient Chinese dynasties could still be found among Taoist priests".

dàofú (道服; 'Taoist priest robes') are broad and elegant robes which were initially worn by Taoist priests. In the Song dynasty, the daofu was very popular. It was greatly appreciated by some hermits and scholars during this period and was mentioned in some poems written by Wang Yucheng being described as "the silk wadding cap, coarse clothes and black muslin scarf" and Fan Zhongyan who described the Taoist priests as dressing themselves sprucely. Fan Zhongyan also noted that "gentlemen dressed like them [i.e. Taoist priests] might also live and easy and free life". Some scholars, such Shi Manqing (994–1041), and some officials in retirement also liked to dressed in daofu. There were many forms of daofu in the ancient China.

=== Qing dynasty ===
In the Qing dynasty, Taoist priests wore dark blue robes.

== Types of Taoist attire ==
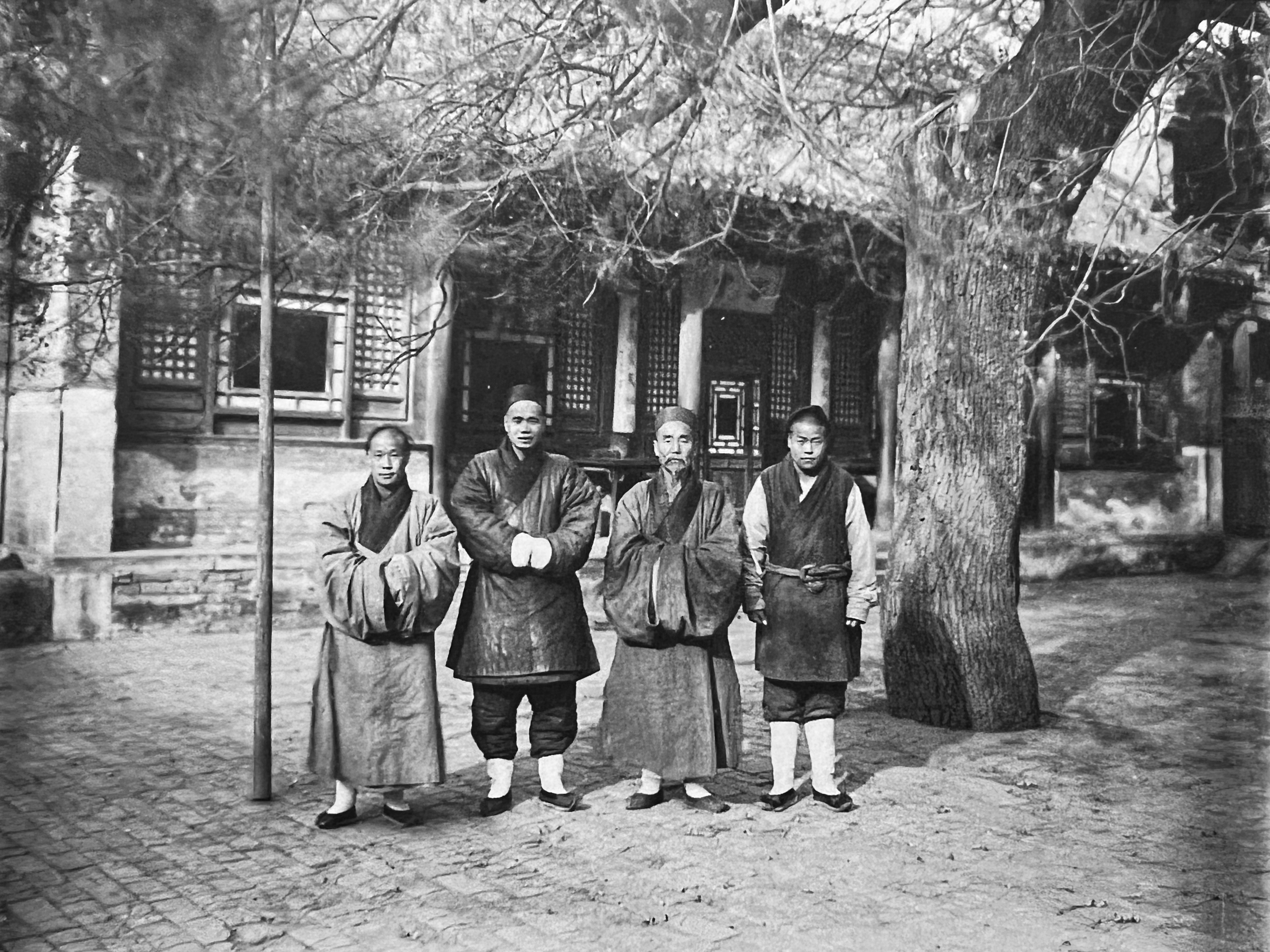
Taoist Priests in White Cloud Temple Beijing Qing dynasty, between 1890 and 1910

The traditional clothing worn by the Taoist community is connected to pre-modern Chinese clothing and styles.

Nowadays, tradition-based taoists will often wear the traditional robes and liturgical clothing for formal religious and ritual occasions; while Zhengyi priests and taoists priests outside mainland China tend to wear Western clothing in their daily lives. The traditional taoist robes can also be worn as a daily lives clothing by the Quanzhen monastics in mainland China.

=== Garment ===
Taoist priests commonly wear two types of clothing: daopao and jiangyi; these two forms of attire are often decorated with cosmic symbolism in their upper and central back section and often includes elements such as, the sun and moon, mountains and water, etc.

==== Daofu ====
In the Ming dynasty, the daofu is a wide-sleeved, crossed-collar robe which closes to the right and has dark edging at the edges of the collar, sleeves, and placket. In the collar edge, a collar protector known as huling (simplified Chinese: 护领; traditional Chinese: 護領; pinyin: hù lǐng; lit. 'protective collar') is sometimes inserted. The Ming daofu is similar to the daopao, except for the addition of edges decoration on the robe. Belts like dadai (大带) and sitao (丝绦; i.e. a ribbon or a thin rope made of silk) is also used around the waist when wearing the daofu.

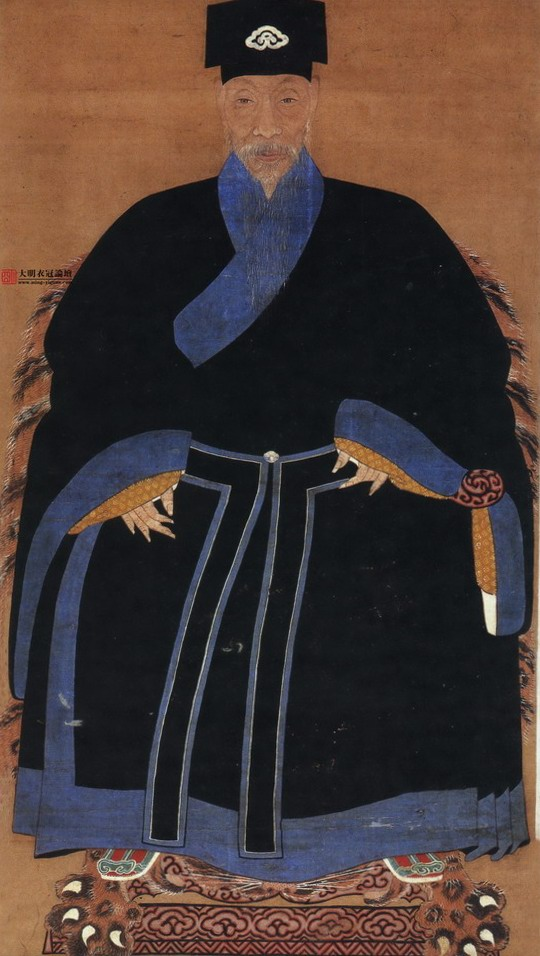
A daofu with a dadai belt worn around the waist, Ming dynasty portrait.

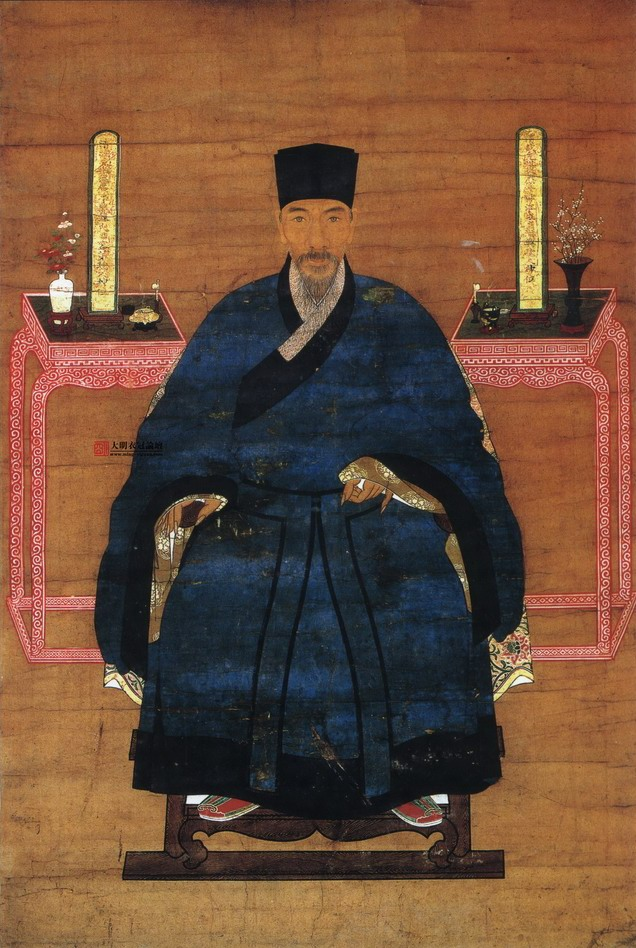
A daofu with a huling sewn onto the collar and dadai worn around the waist, Ming dynasty portrait.

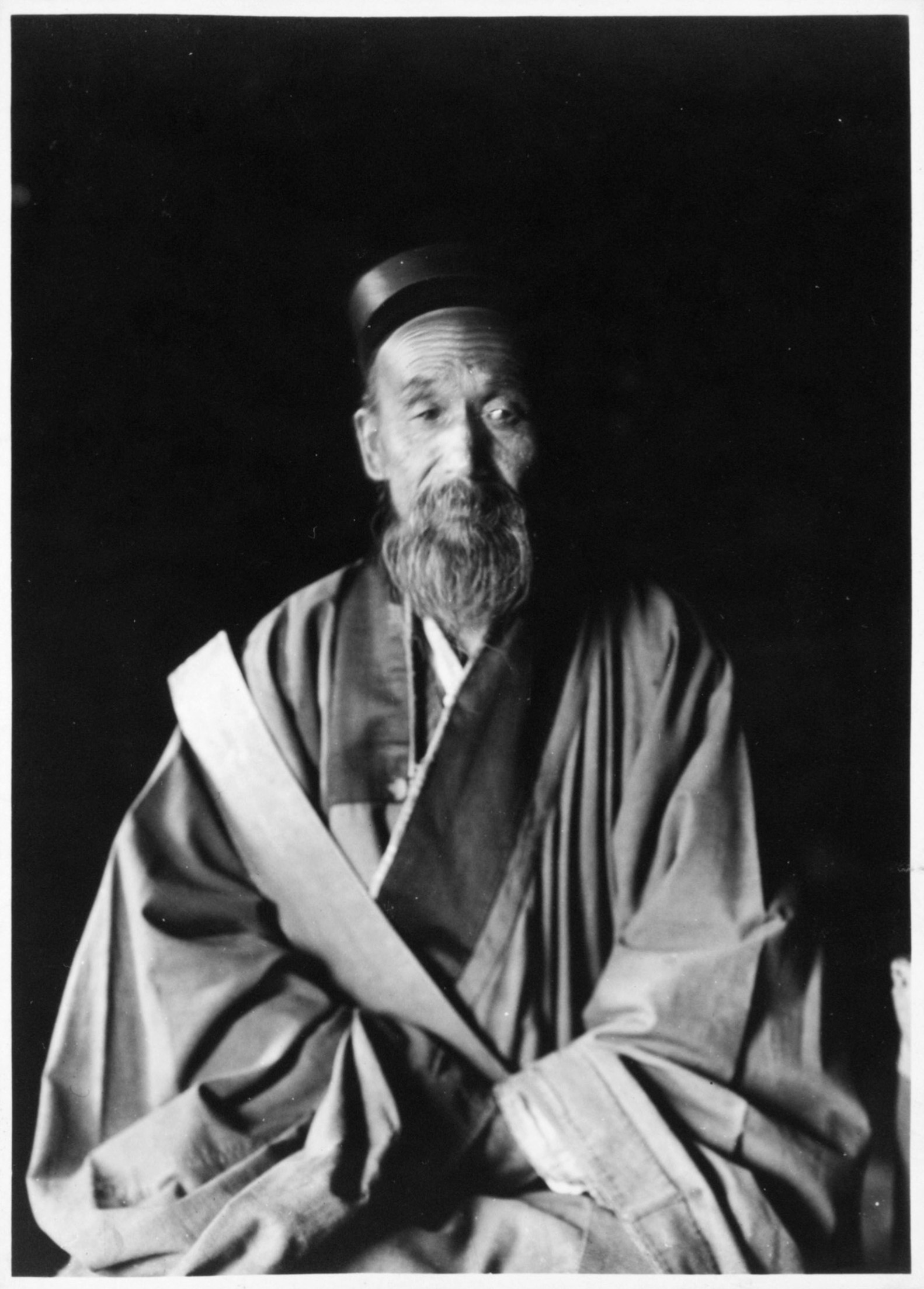
Photograph of a Taoist daofu in 1931.

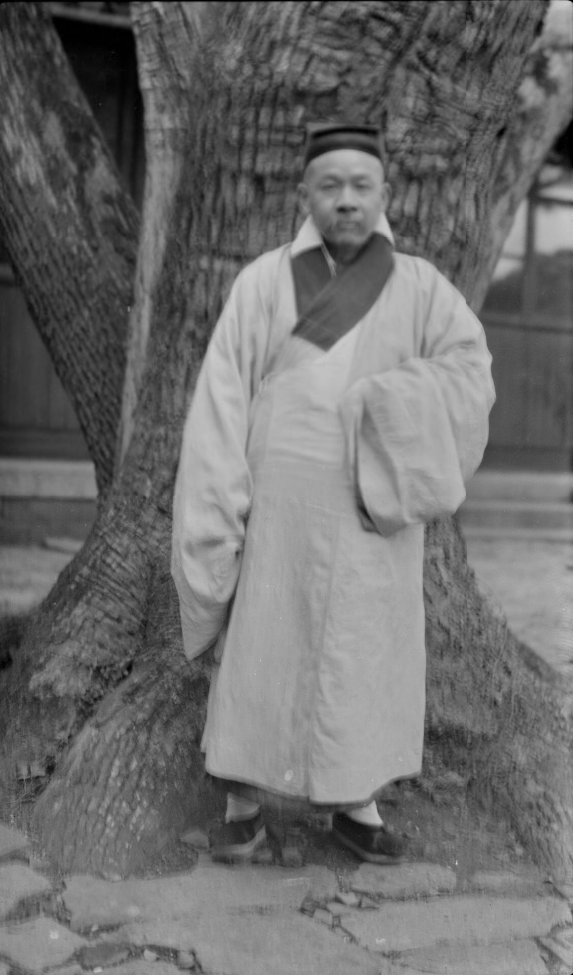
Photograph of a Taoist priest in 1923.

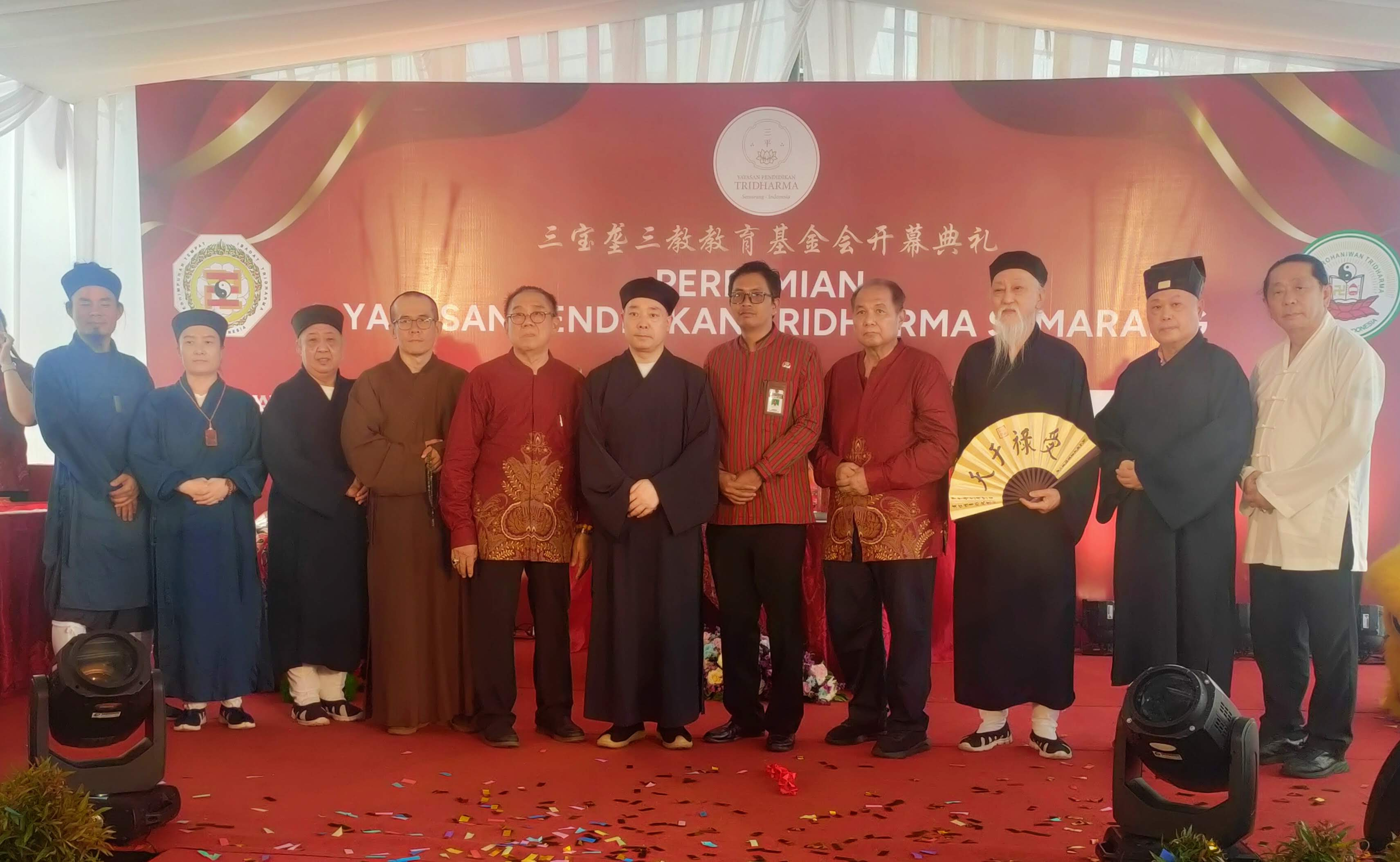
Taoists wearing daofu at an opening ceremony at San Ping Academy, Central Java, Indonesia, 2024.

==== Daopao/ hechang ====
Some forms of taoist robes are also referred as crane robes (鶴氅; hechang). This form of Taoist priests' daopao is not cross collared and instead looks like a beizi in terms of construction and design; a clothing artefact showing this style of daopao is now stored in museums such as the Rhode Island School of Design Museum. Daopao in the form of hechang has been recorded since the Northern Song dynasty. Jin dynasty unearthed artefacts of daopao in the form of hechang have been excavated from a late 12th century tomb of a Taoist named Yan Deyuan, near Datong in Shanxi province; these robes are decorated with cranes, which are associated with the Taoist idea of transcendence since at least the Han dynasty and possibly prior to the Han dynasty.

The Taoist's priest daopao are commonly worn by the Taoism priests. It is worn by middle-ranks Taoist priests; it is red in colour and has motifs at the back and front, on the sleeves. Theses motifs decorations can include, the bagua and cranes.

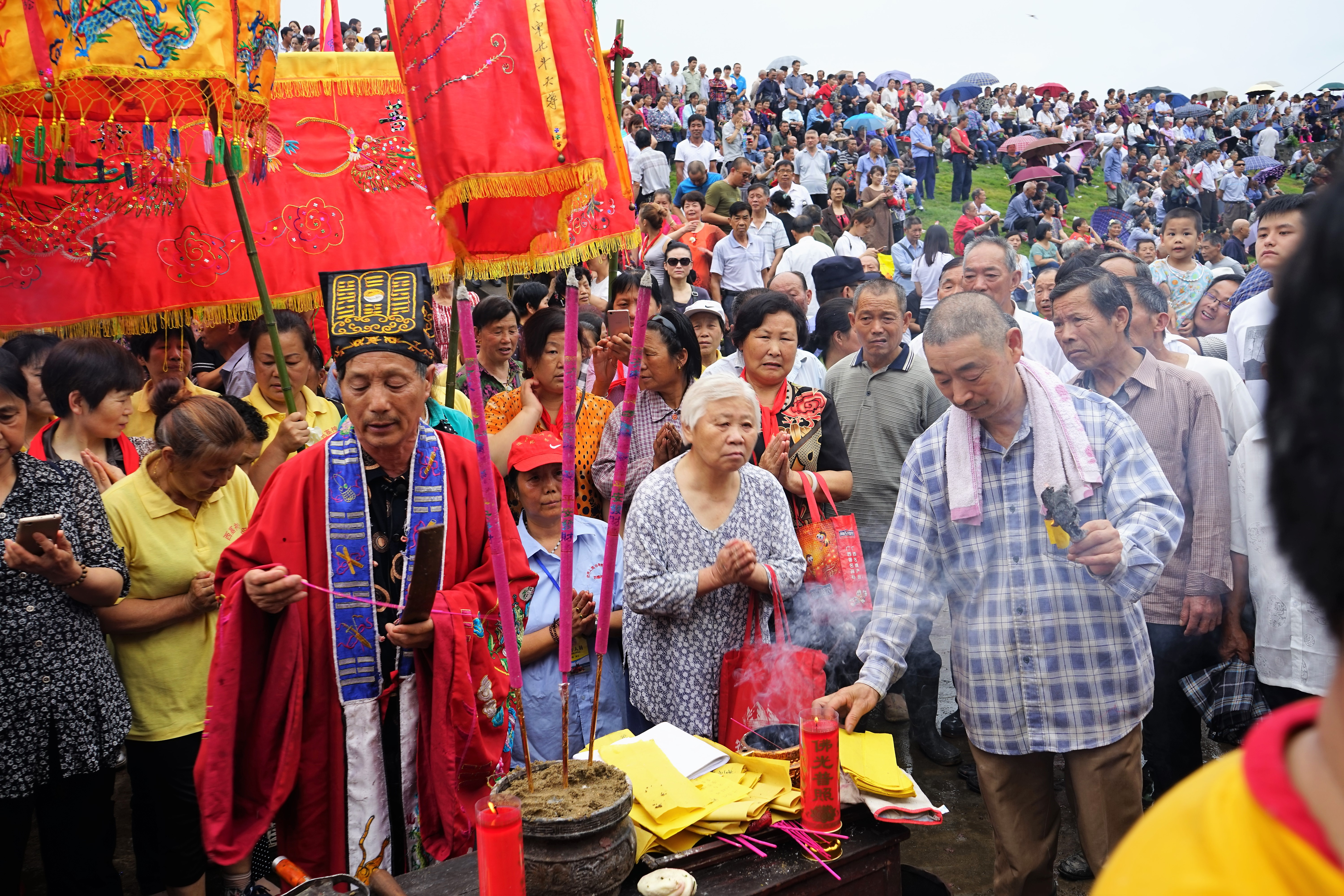
A taoist priest wearing a modern-day taoist's daopao (depicted as a red overcoat), 2017.

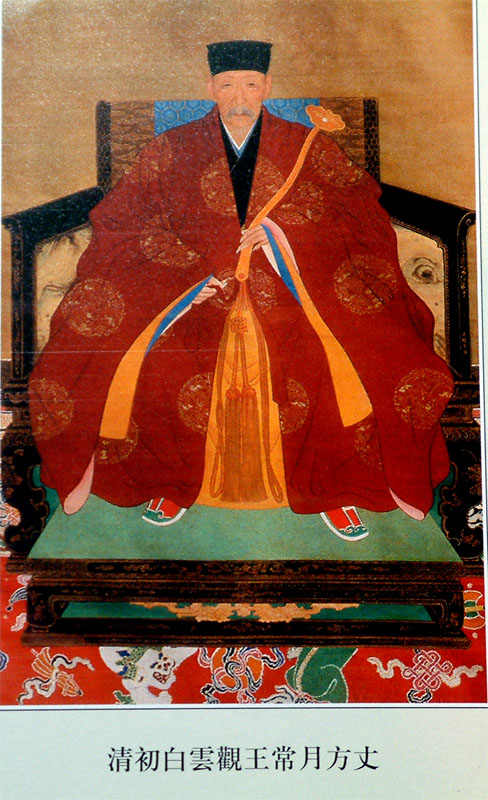
Wang Changyue, Qing dynasty.

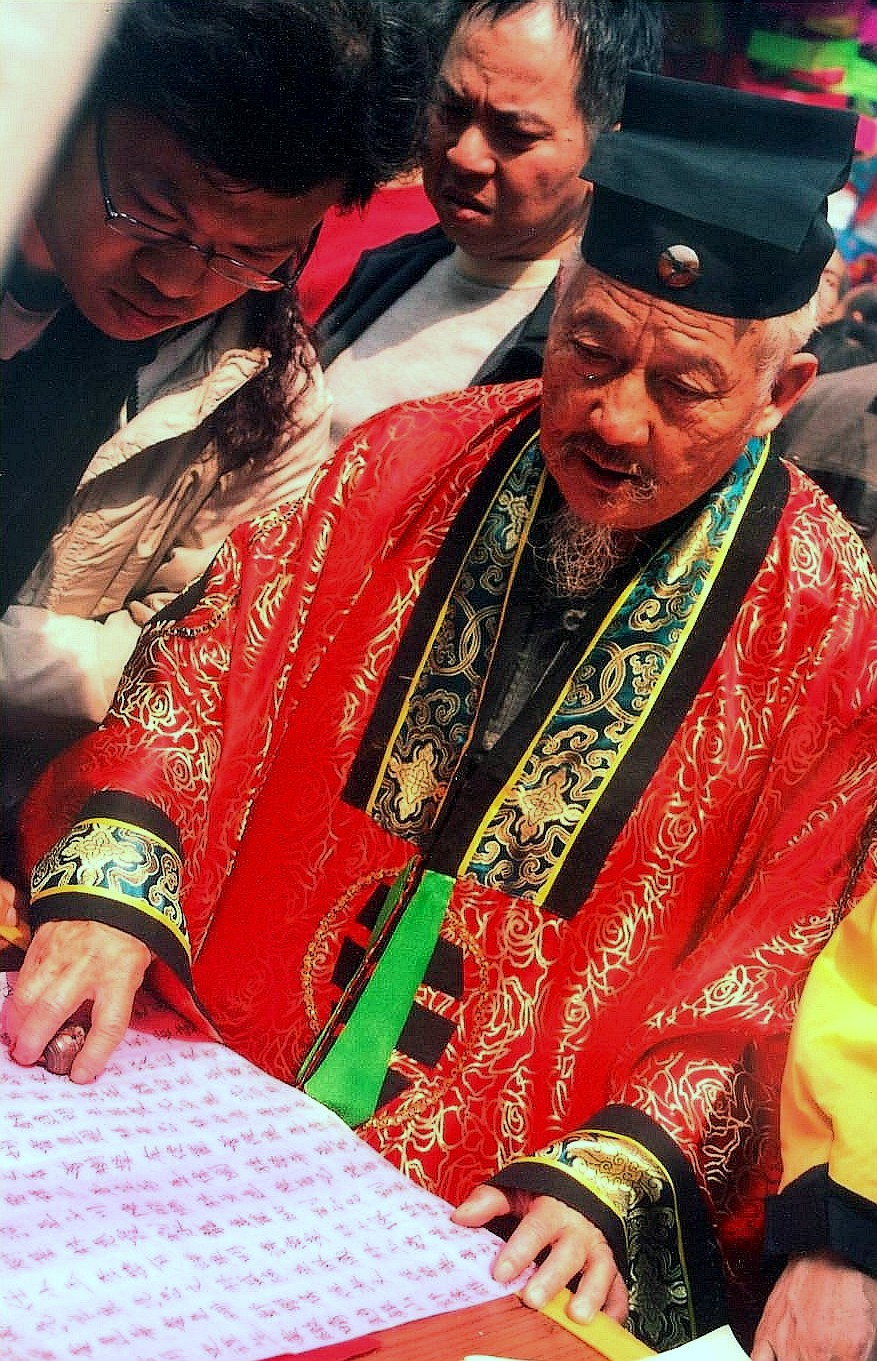
Taoist Priest in Macau, 2006.

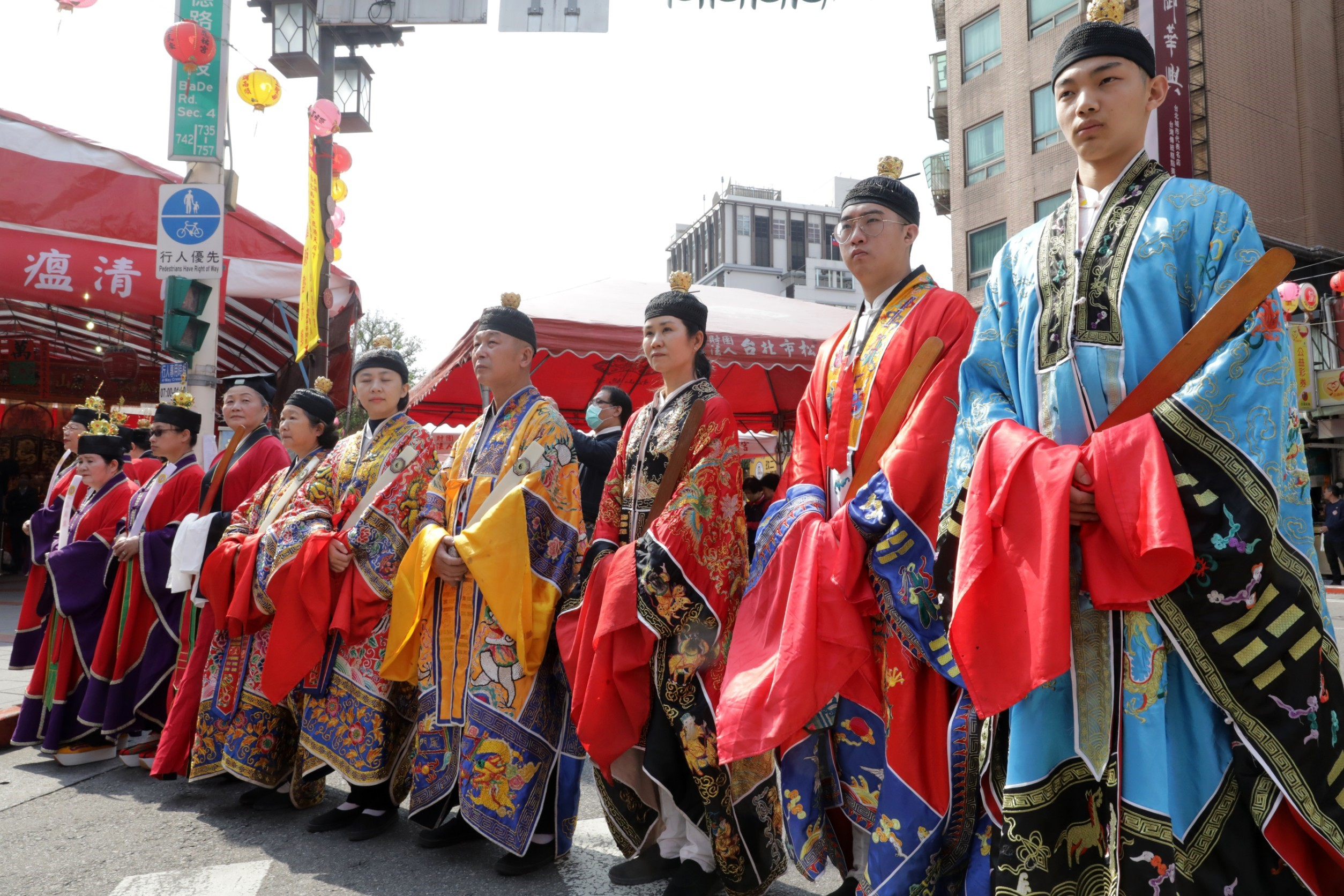
Taoist clergy during a ceremony at Ciyou Temple, Taiwan.

==== Jiangyi ====
Jiangyi (Chinese: 絳衣; pinyin: jiàngyī), also known as "robe of descent" which refers to either the descent of a priest from the altar or of the spirits to the altar, is a common form of Taoist priest's clothing. The jiangyi is a sign of the higher priestly rank and is worn by grandmasters. It was worn at least since the Jin dynasty with unearthed artefacts having been excavated from a late 12th century tomb of a Taoist named Yan Deyuan, near Datong in Shanxi province.

It looks similar to a poncho in structure; when worn, the robes sits squarely on the shoulders of the Taoist' priest; it is usually fastened across the front with 2 silk ties which are sewn just above the waist level. It is made of embroidered silks and is composed of a large square of satin fabric folded into two to form the shoulder line; the shoulder lines continues to the hem of the sleeves. The robe is slashed in the middle to form the collar of the robe. It is typically trimmed with border decorations. Common motifs on the jiangyi include: the sun, moon, Three Heavens, Sacred (Golden) Tower and Flying cranes; Stars and Constellations; Wu yue (True forms of the Five Sacred Peaks); Mountain Peaks and Cosmic waters. The square fabric shape symbolizes the concept of the earth, which is square in Chinese cosmology. When the priests opened his arms, the square silhouette of the jiangyi becomes fully visible and the motifs which typically the heaves became visible; therefore, by wearing the jiangyi, the daoshi embodies the conjunction of heaven and earth. Jiangyi are often found in the five symbolic colours of the universe (i.e. black, red, green, yellow or white).

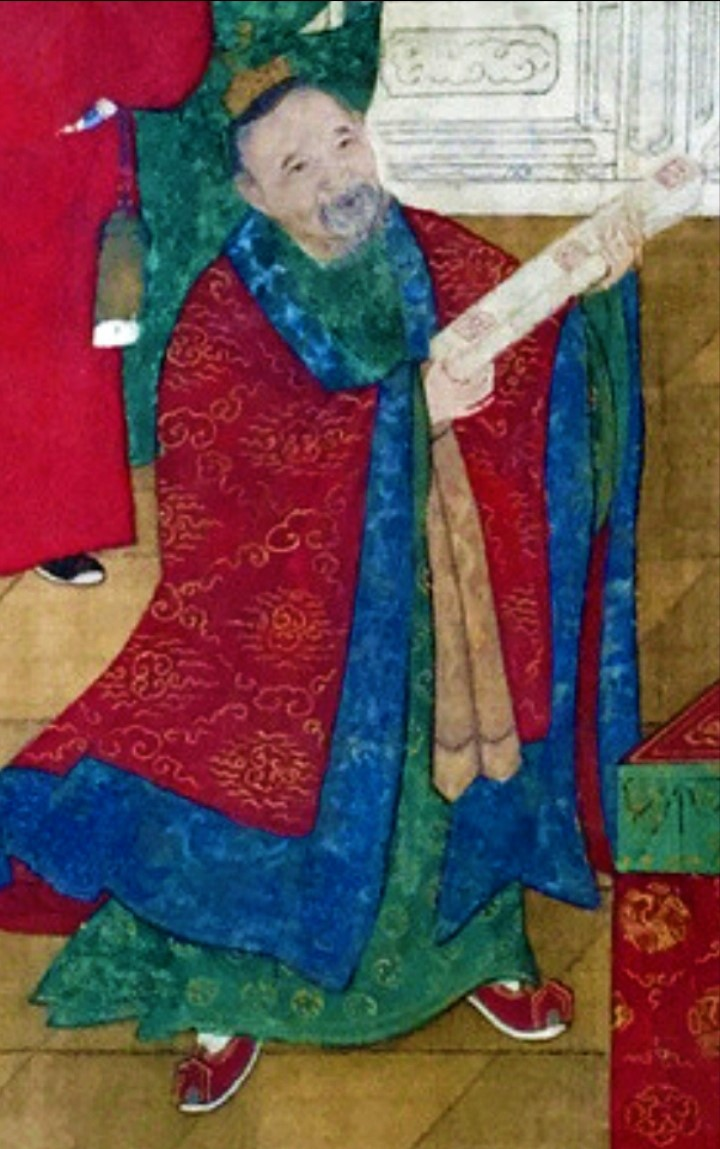
Zhengyi taoist priest wearing jiangyi, Ming Dynasty.

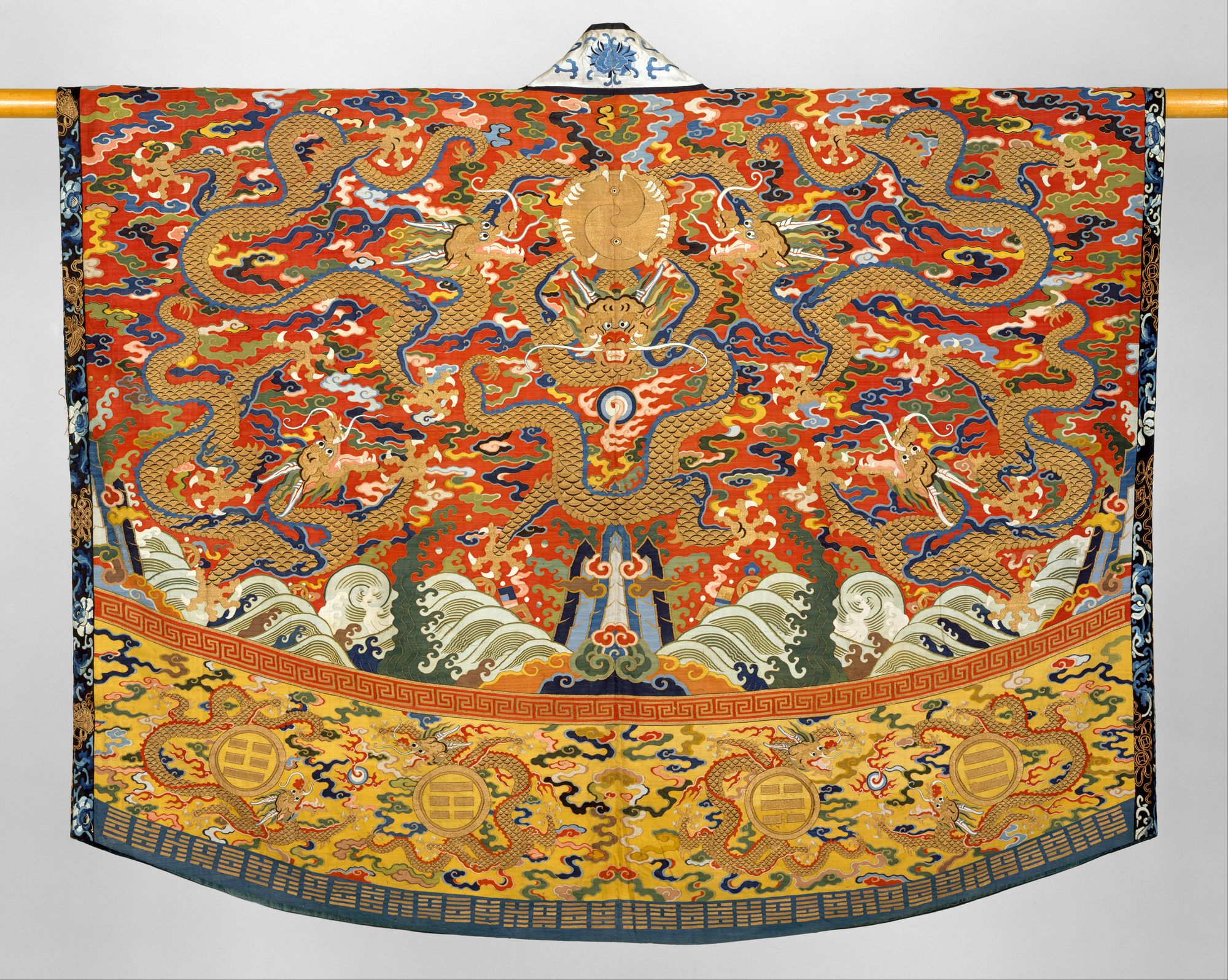
Ming/Qing jiangyi, 16th century

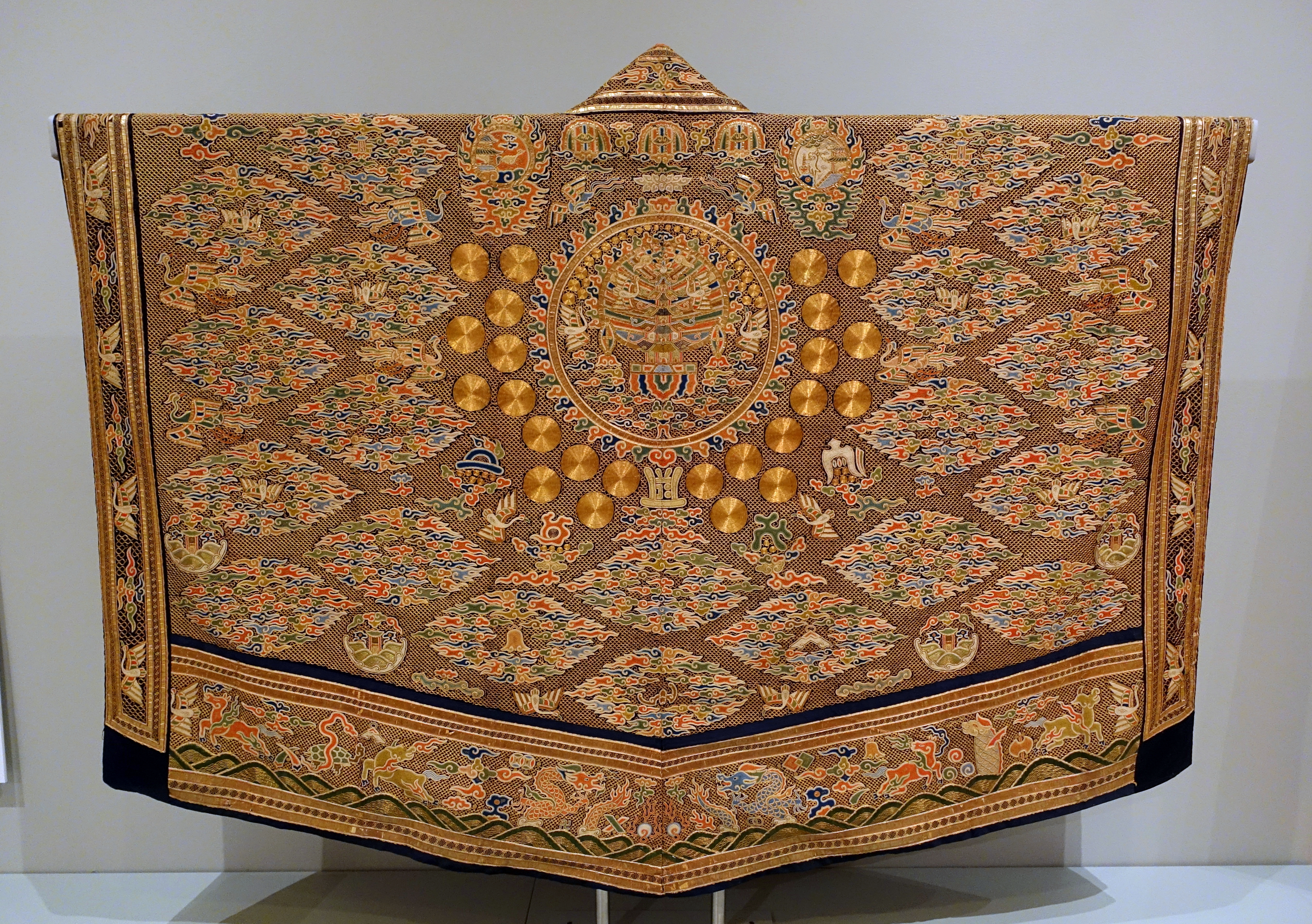
Daoist priest's robe (jiangyi), China, Qing dynasty, late 18th to early 19th century AD/

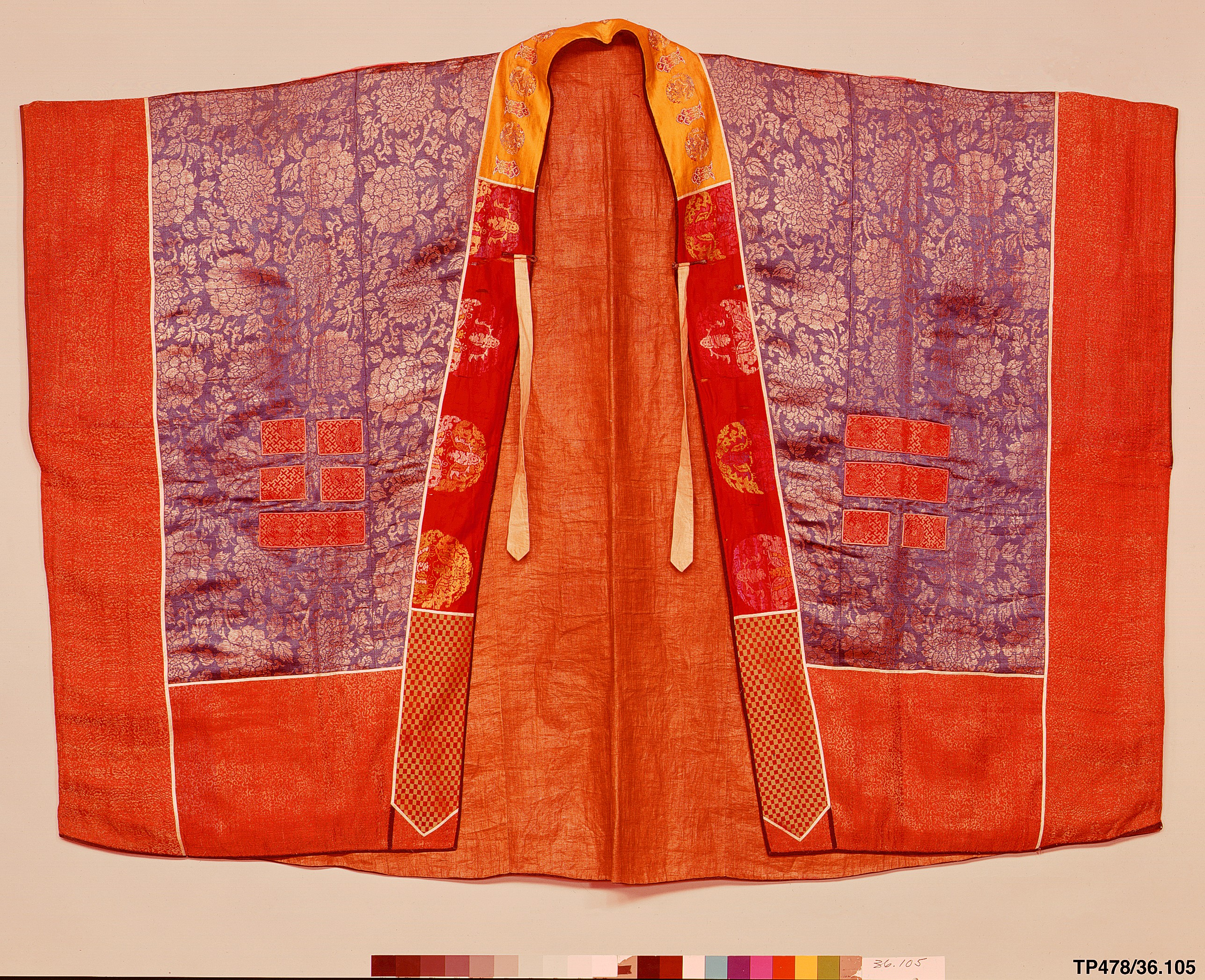
Daoist Priest's Robe (jiangyi), late 18th–early 19th century

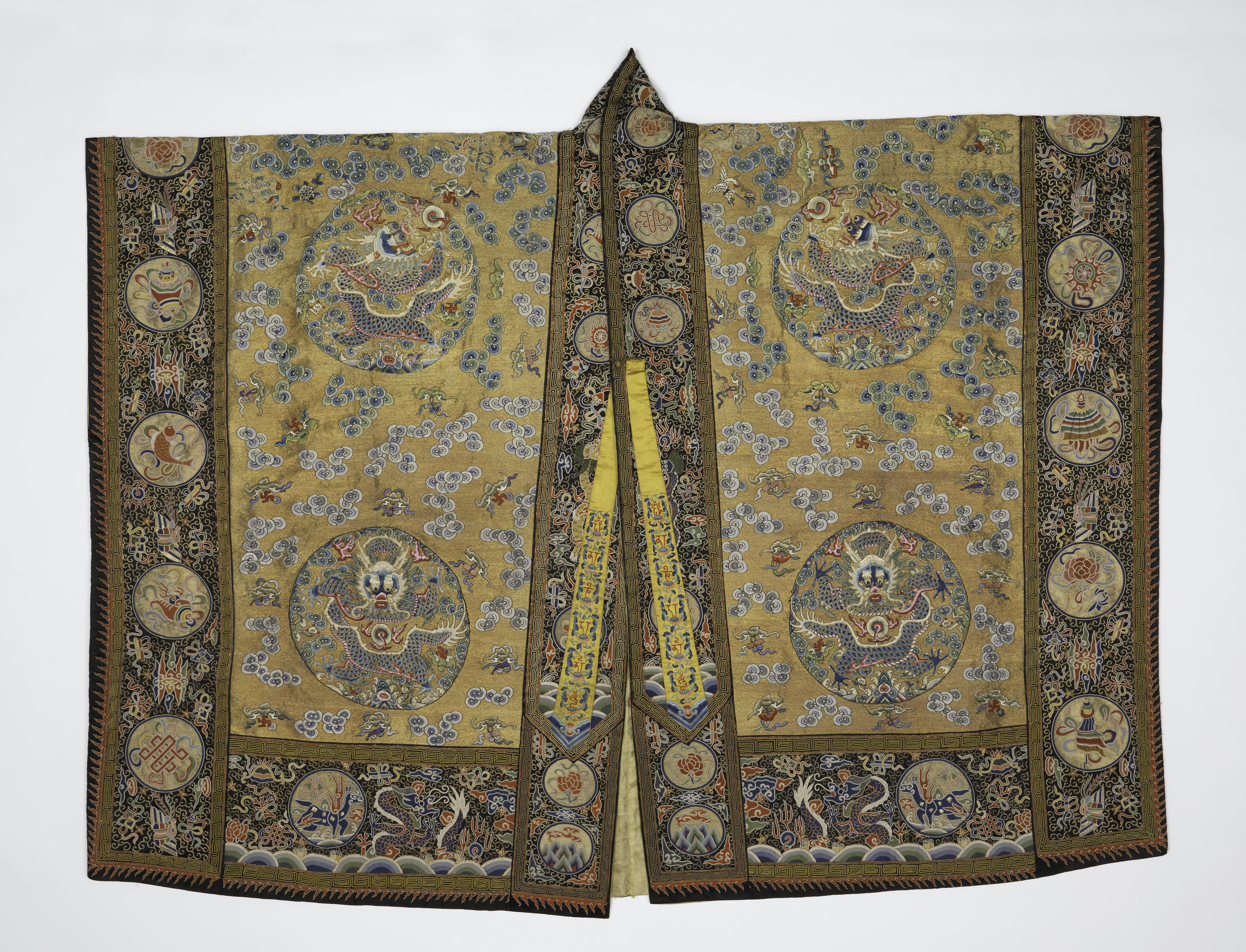
Daoist Priest's Robe (jiangyi), 19th century

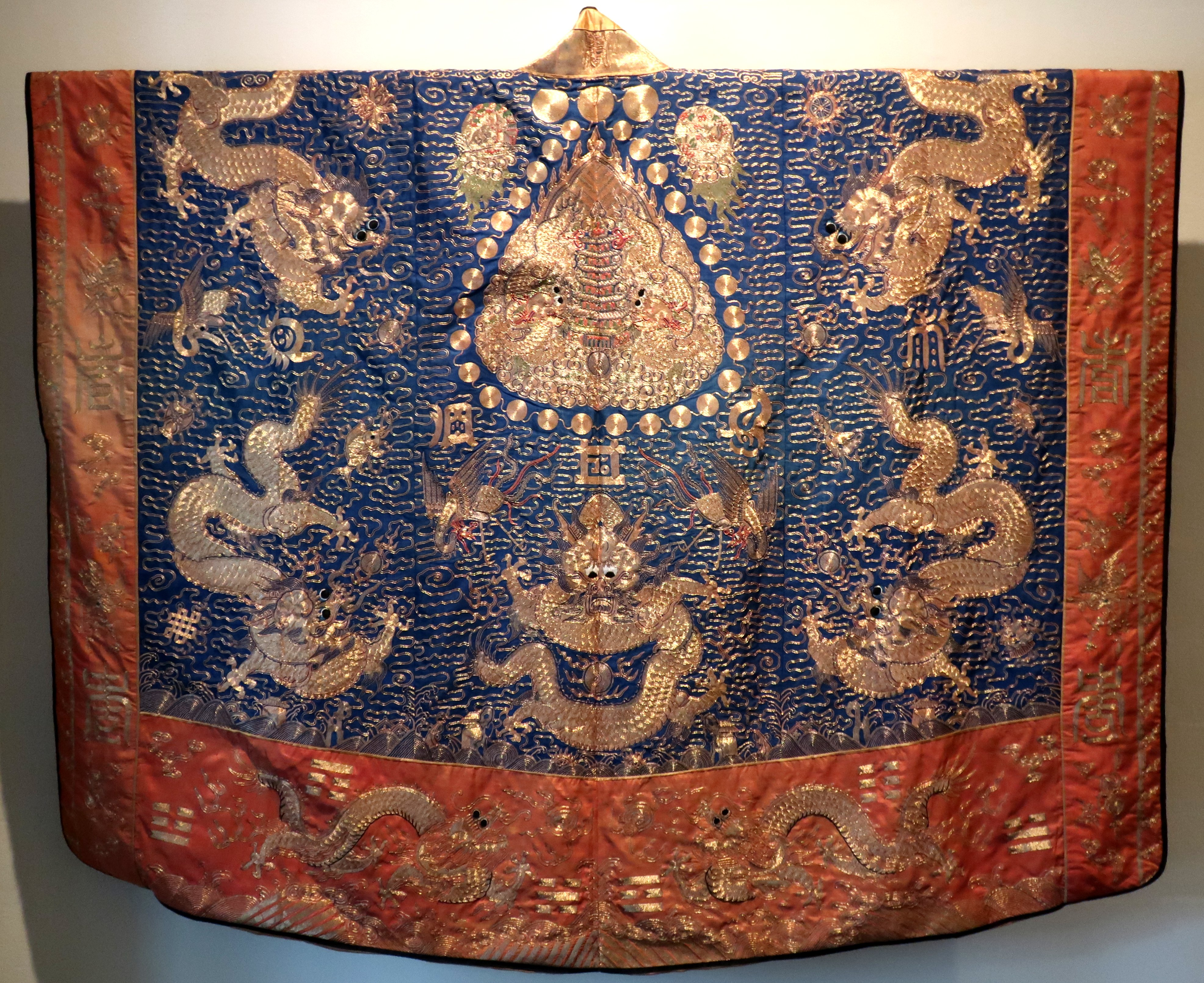
Daoist priest's robe (jiangyi), China, 20th century.

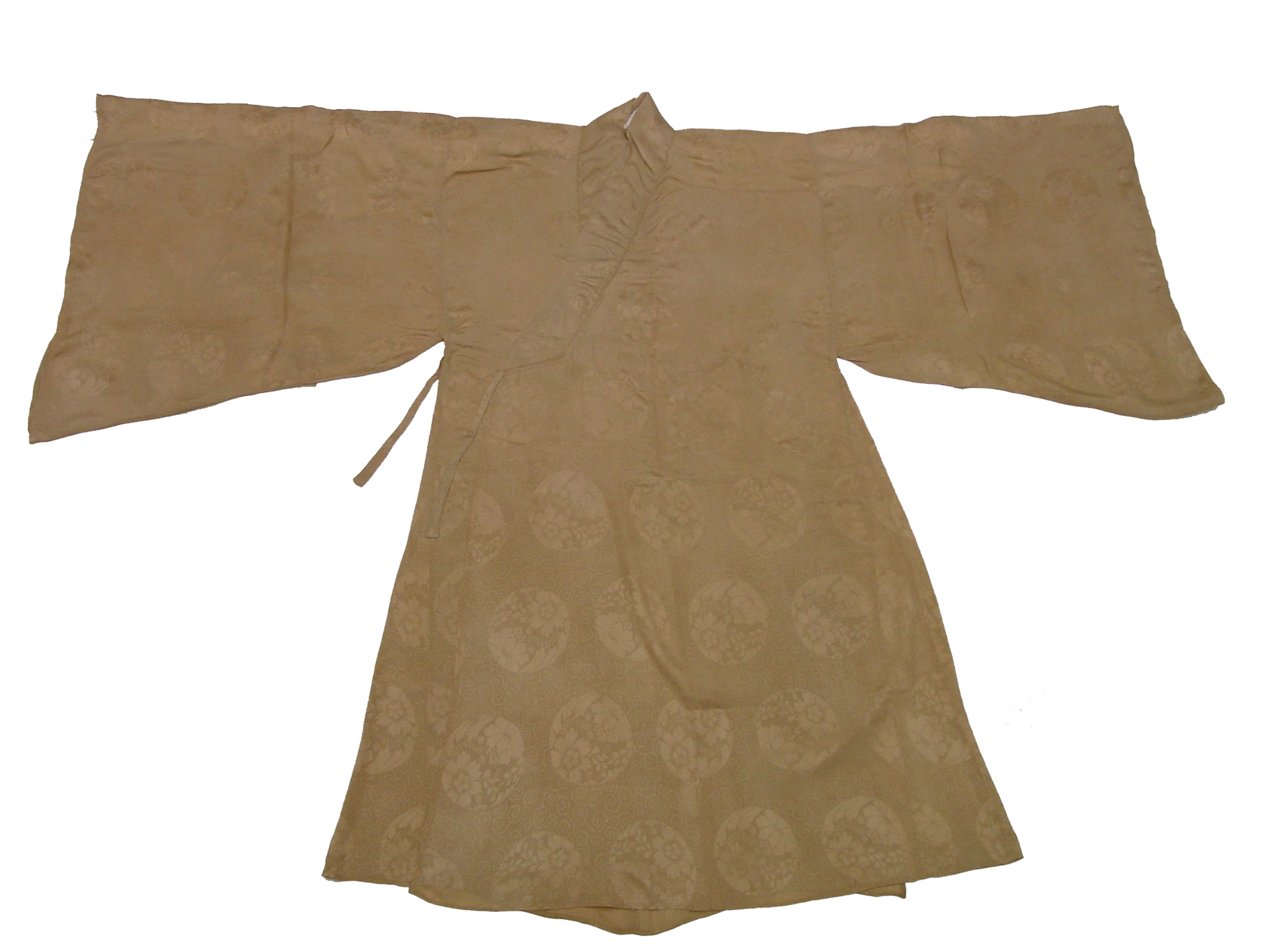
A priest's robe, China, 20th century

Illustration of a man wearing daoyi (道衣) and Taoist fly-whisk from Gujin Tushu Jicheng, between 1700 and 1725.

==== Daoyi ====
The Quanzhen monastic taoist priests and nuns wear a wide-sleeved, cross-collared gown called daoyi (道衣; 'robe of the Dao') which closes to the right; it is a standard type of clothing. The sleeves of the daoyi is referred as "cloud sleeves"; they are wide, open at the ends, and their sleeves are so long that it is past the fingers when extended but can be even longer. In the Quanzhen order, the dagua is worn as one of the ordinary clothing while the deluo is a formal clothing.

==== Deluo ====
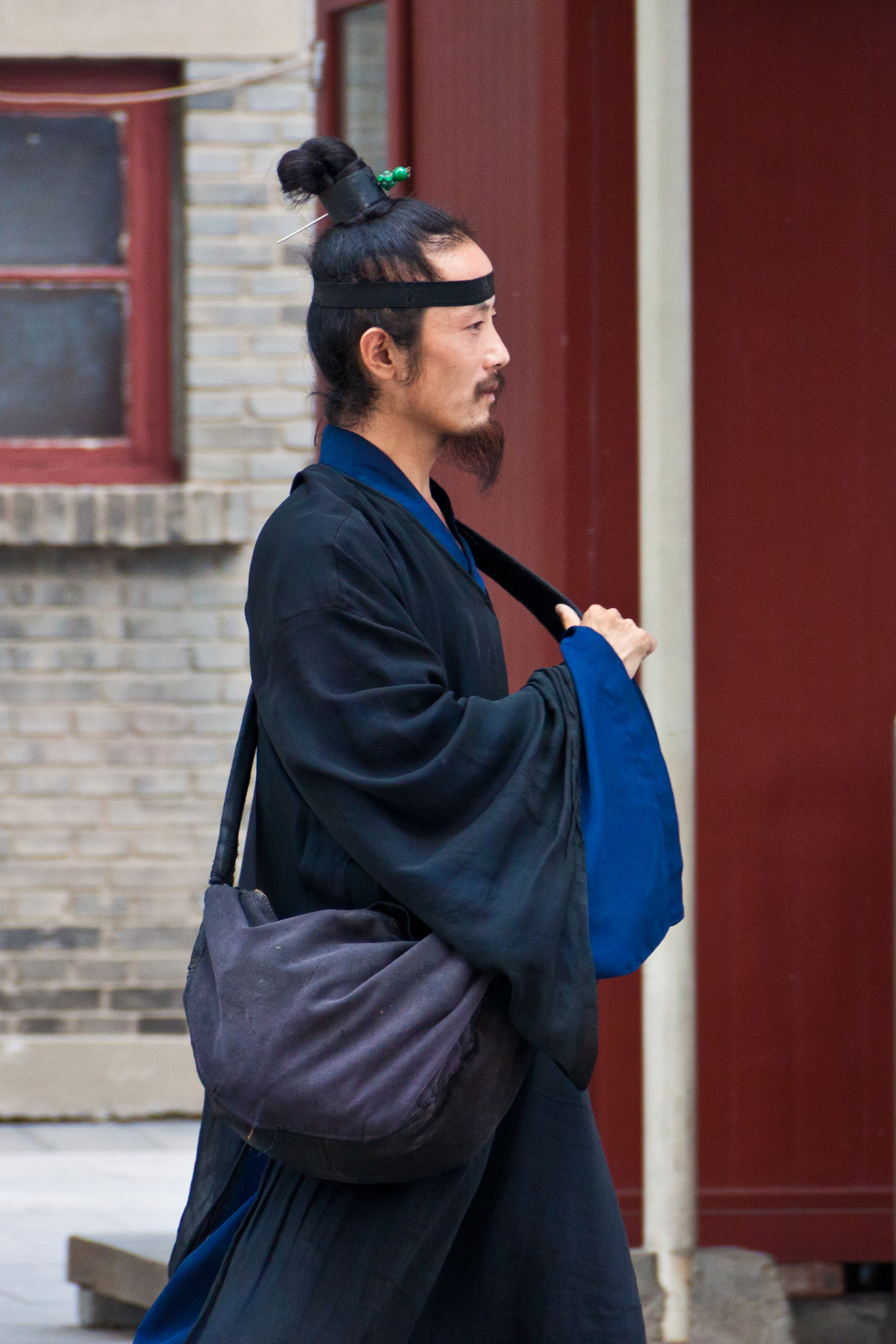
A modern-day Taoist.

The deluo (得罗) is a cross-collared gown with large sleeves. It is worn by Taoist priests of the Quanzhen order is a formal ritual dress which is indigo in colour. The blue colour is a symbolism for the east and represents having been descended from the first patriarch of the Quanzhen school, Donghua dijun. In large temples (e.g. Baiyunguan in Beijing), the deluo would be worn by monastics on festival days; the deluo would have wide sleeves which could reach 45 cm.

==== Daogua ====
In the Wengong temple in Hanzhong, the cross-collar daopao is the standard form of attire and is referred as daogua (道褂; 'Taoist robe or jacket') depending on context. Their daopao is cross-collared at the front, and the sleeves are so long that only the fingers can escape from the sleeves. It is made of thick garments and is blue or black in colour.

The daogua can be found in 3 types: dagua (大褂; 'great gown'; "a long cross-collar robe which reaches the ankles and has 42 cm wide sleeves"), zhonggua (中褂; "a cross-collar robe which reaches the mid-calf and has slightly narrower sleeves than the dagua"), and xiaogua (小褂; "a cross-collar robe which reaches the hip and has sleeves which could either be the same size or narrower than a zhongua; the xiaogua is more similar to a jacket than a robe").

==== Patchwork robes ====
Patchwork robes is a form of ritual dress; it is made of various pieces of old clothing sewn together are worn by the Taoist priests of the Quanzhen school of Hong Kong.

=== Headwear and headdress ===
List of headwear and headdress
Name	Description	Image
Cihang cap	Cihang cap is the High Taoist priest's headdress of the Quanzhen school of Hong Kong which is worn exclusively for rituals such as The Anterior Heaven Ritual for Feeding, Saving and Refining Ghosts. When the High Taoist priest acts as the gods’ proxy and expounds Taoist scriptures and practice, he would have the “Five-emperor” lotus petal-shaped headdress tied to the front of his cap. The five lotus petals are embroidered with images of the Five Emperors of the Five Directions.	
Haoranjin	It looks like a long hood. it is made of cotton and protects its wearer from the wind and the cold.	
Heye Jin (荷叶巾; "lotus leaf headscarf")	It is similar to the zhuangzijin (庄子巾) in shape but has ruffles likes a lotus leaf, thus gaining its name.	
混元巾; "Huyuan hat"/ guanJin (冠巾)	It is a round, hard-shelled hat with holes in the top of the hat to reveal the hair bun. The upper back is slightly raised to symbolize transcendence. It is the most formal headscarf in Quanzhen School of Taoism.	
Jiuliang Jin (九梁巾; 'nine-fold scarf')/ Chunyangjin (纯阳巾),	It is a form of headwear worn by Zhenyi priests. It is a hat with 9 slits in the front of the hat which grows like the ridge of a roof. The number 9 is the largest number in Taoist and represents the "Heavens above"; therefore wearing it represents the unity of heaven and man.	
Lianhua Guan (莲花冠; 'Lotus Crown')	A type of guan resembling a lotus flower in full bloom, often made of gold and/or jade aodrned with gemstones. It became popular during the Tang and Song dynasties, and is worn by highest rank Taoist Master.	
太阳巾 ("Sun hat")	They are worn by Taoist priests who work under the hot sun in summer; some Taoist monks wear it to differentiate themselves from other members of the society by hollowing the top of the hat to make their hair visible or by painting the brim of their hats with Taoist patterns, such as the Bagua and Taiji, or they would write name of the Taoist temple where they lived.	
Xiaoyao Jin (逍遥巾)	A square (or round) headscarf; it is wrapped in a hair bun and tied with two long headbands. It is liked by the young Taoist priest.	
Yizijin (一字巾)	A type of hairband.	
Zhuangzijin (庄子巾) / Chonghe scarf/ Nanhua scarf	It is worn by the Taoist priests from the Quanzhen school. The bottom of the scarf is square-shaped while the upper part is triangular in shape like a roof. There is a jade on the front region of the scarf which can help to adjust the scarf wearing in proper direction.	

=== Shoes ===
Cloud shoes are the shoes worn by the high Taoist priests only. The name of the shoes come from the cloud embroidery patterns fond on the shoes. These shoes are bright red.

== See also ==
- Hanfu
- List of Hanfu
- Taoism
