= Tongtian Jiaozhu =

Chinese mythological figure

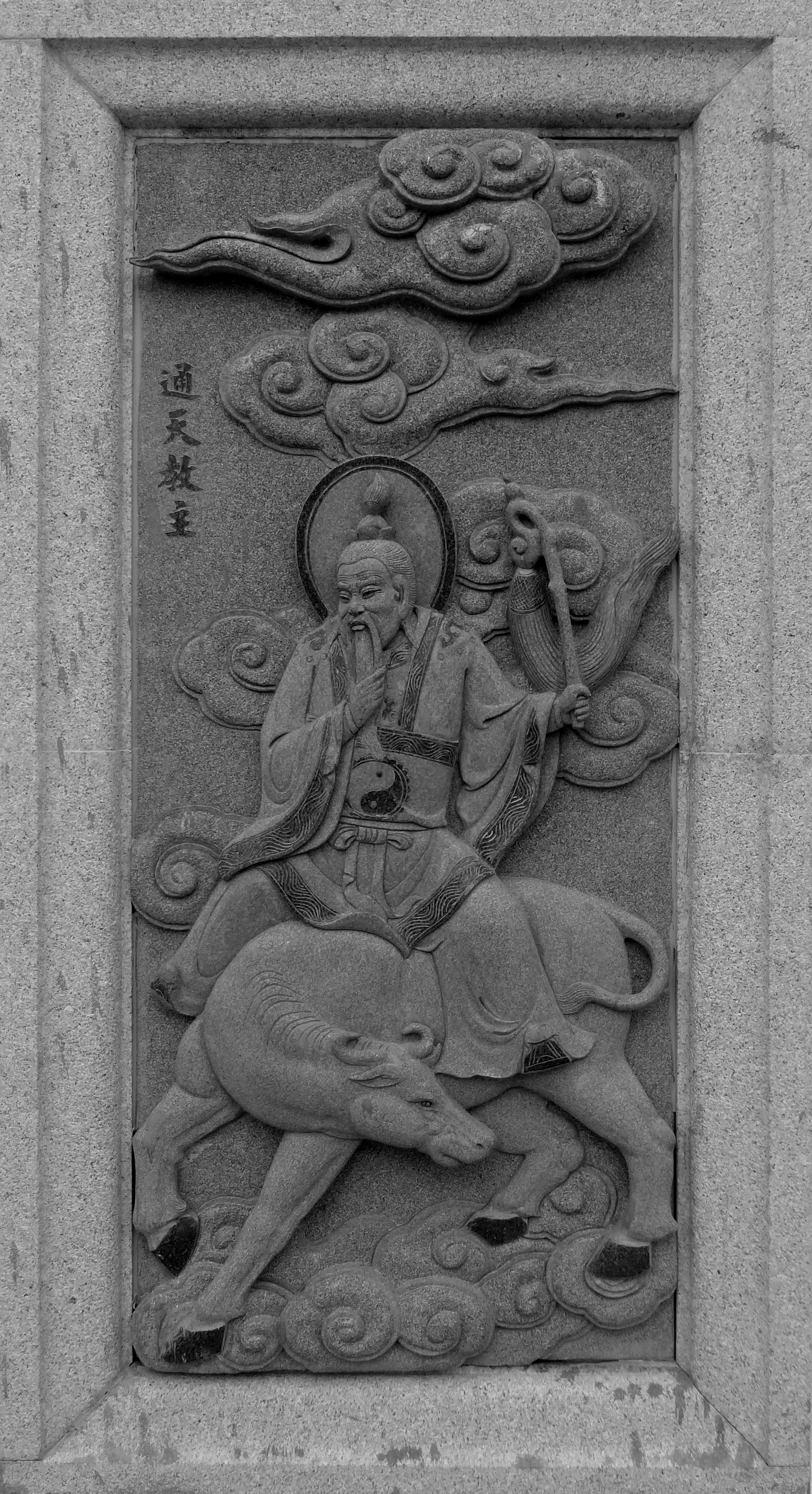
Tongtian Jiao Zhu

Tongtian Jiaozhu (Chinese: 通天教主; pinyin: Tōngtiān Jiàozhǔ), also translated as Grandmaster of Heaven, is a Taoist deity and mythological figure in Chinese literature and folklore. In Fengshen Yanyi, he is the third disciple of Hongjun Laozu and the younger brother of Yuanshi Tianzun and Taishang Laojun. He is the founder and leader of the Jie sect (截教) and serves as one of the novel's major opposing figures.

== In Investiture of the Gods ==
Tongtian Jiaozhu was a disciple of Hongjun Laozu, alongside Taishang Laojun and Yuanshi Tianzun. Unlike his two elder brothers, who lead the Chan sect (阐教), Tongtian Jiaozhu is the founder of the Jie sect (截教). He resides at Biyou Palace (碧游宫) on Jin'ao Island (金鳌岛). The Jie sect accepts disciples from various origins, including humans, animals, spirits, and demons, whom Tongtian Jiaozhu teaches in the practice of cultivation.

Before the war between the Shang dynasty and the Zhou dynasty, Tongtian Jiaozhu meets with Taishang Laojun and Yuanshi Tianzun to establish the Investiture Roster (封神榜). He warns his Jie sect disciples not to participate in the conflict, telling them that those who leave their retreats will face death and have their names added to the roster.

Despite his warning, many Jie sect disciples become involved in the war after being persuaded by figures such as Shen Gongbao and Grand Tutor Wen Zhong to support the Shang side. Many of them are later defeated and killed by Chan sect immortals supporting King Wu of Zhou.

Tongtian Jiaozhu remains neutral at first. After the Chan immortal Guangchengzi kills his disciple Huoling Shengmu and returns her magical crown to Biyou Palace, Duobao Daoren (多宝道人) tells Tongtian that Guangchengzi and the Chan sect have insulted him and the Jie sect. Tongtian Jiaozhu then joins the war.

Tongtian Jiaozhu gives four magical swords to Duobao Daoren, who uses them to establish the "Immortal Slaughtering Array" (诛仙阵). The array is defeated by Taishang Laojun and Yuanshi Tianzun together with Jieyin Daoren and Zhunti Daoren.

Afterward, Tongtian Jiaozhu establishes the "Ten Thousand Immortal Array" (万仙阵), which is also defeated by the Chan sect and Western deities. He then attempts to destroy and recreate the world, but his master Hongjun Laozu appears and stops him. Hongjun Laozu reprimands the three brothers and gives them a pill that will cause their deaths if they fight each other again. Tongtian Jiaozhu is taken away by Hongjun Laozu for punishment.

== Later depictions ==
Tongtian Jiaozhu also appears in the novel Baxian Dedao (八仙得道). He fights Taishang Laojun in a magical contest. During the fight, Laojun's disciple Wenshi Zhenren (文始真人) shoots him in one eye.

In a folk tale told among the Xuejiawan people (薛家湾人), Tongtian Jiaozhu competes in magic with Taishang Laojun and Yuanshi Tianzun. Each has a lotus plant. Laojun's plant flowers first, while Tongtian's has only begun to grow. Tongtian secretly swaps his plant with Laojun's, but Laojun catches him and calls him a thief.

== Interpretations ==
In Taoism, the Three Pure Ones are Yuanshi Tianzun, Lingbao Tianzun, and Daode Tianzun (Taishang Laojun). In Investiture of the Gods, Yuanshi Tianzun and Taishang Laojun are brothers of Tongtian Jiaozhu, the leader of the Jie sect. Some scholars believe that Tongtian Jiaozhu was based on Lingbao Tianzun.

Zhao Kangli argues that Tongtian Jiaozhu is more than a simple villain. She examines his role in the conflict between the Chan and Jie sects and discusses the ideas of good and evil, humanity, and divinity in the novel.

The conflict between the Chan and Jie sects has also been read as a struggle between good and evil. However, the novel does not make every member of the Jie sect evil. Song Lihua notes that Wen Zhong remains loyal to Shang and tries to avoid unnecessary killing, despite belonging to the Jie sect.

== Temple ==
In southern China, some temples are dedicated to Tongtian Jiaozhu. One is the Tongtian Jiaozhu Temple in Haikou, Hainan Province.

In Taiwan, the Sansheng Temple (三聖宮) in Yilan City worships Lingbao Tianzun as its main deity, who is locally known as Tongtian Jiaozhu or "Master Teacher" (老師公). According to the temple's history, during the Japanese colonial period a local resident, Ye Jinfeng (葉金風), was believed to have become possessed by the deity and performed rituals to help villagers. The deity was later identified by worshippers as Lingbao Tianzun.
