= Hongjun Laozu =

Taoist deity

Hongjun Laozu (simplified Chinese: 鸿钧老祖; traditional Chinese: 鴻鈞老祖; pinyin: Hóngjūn Lǎozǔ; Wade–Giles: Hung-chün Lao-tsu) lit. "Ancestor of the Great Balance" is a deity in Chinese folk religion and Taoism, teacher of the Three Pure Ones in Taoist mythology. Hongjun 鴻鈞 is a graphic variant of hungjun (洪钧; 洪鈞; hóngjūn; hung-chün) "primordial nature", as used in the Chinese idiom Xian you hongjun hou you tian 先有鸿钧后有天 "First there was Hongjun and then there was Heaven".

Daoists mythologize Hongjun Laozu as the ancestor of xian "trancendents; immortals" and use the honorific name Hongyuan Laozu (鸿元老祖; 鴻元老祖; Hóngyuán Lǎozǔ; Hung-yuan Lao-tsu) "Great Primal Ancestor". In Chinese creation myths, hongyuan 鸿元 or 洪元 is a cosmological term for "the universe before the separation of heaven and earth".

Some myths about the creator Pangu refer to Hongjun Laozu as Xuanxuan Shangren (玄玄上人; Xuánxuán Shàngrén; Hsüan-hsüan Shang-jen) "Mystery of Mysteries Saint" (a reference to the Daodejing, "Mystery or mysteries, the gate of all wonders!"). Hongjun Laozu is also referred to as Hunyuan Laozu (混元老祖 - "Ancestor of Original Chaos").

== Myth ==
Hongjun Laozu has hardly been the subject of academic studies and the role assigned to it may vary according to the faithful. Some only know his interpretations in fiction. Hongjun Laozu makes his first major appearance in Chinese literature in the popular novel The Investiture of the Gods, under the name of Hongjun Daoren (鴻鈞道人).

According to The Investiture of the Gods, he is the eldest of the four beings created by the Spirit of Creation (Chuangshi Yuanling; 創始元靈), the others being Hunkun Zushi (混鯤祖師), Nüwa Niangniang, and Luya Daojun (陸壓道君). His disciples are the Three Purities: Daode Tianzun (道德天尊) alias Laozi, Yuanshi Tianzun, and Tongtian Jiaozhu (通天教主), assimilated to Lingbao Tianzun. The first two are found in the novel in conflict with the last.

According to the Wujihongjun Gong temple (無極黌君宮) in Taipei, he is the principle behind the universe.

The Cihui Tang temple (慈惠堂) in Zhonggang, Taichung offers the faithful three interpretations:

- He is the origin of the universe, from him are born the Three Pure Ones and then the Five Ancients (wulao 五老), rulers associated with the five elements and the five directions. He is also the ancestor of all immortals.
- The original chaos (hunyuangui 混元規) gave birth to the celestial order (tiangui 天規) embodied by Haotian Laozu (昊天老祖; "Ancestor of the Boundless Sky") and the earthly order (digui 地規) embodied by Hongjun Laozu.
- He is a form of Pangu and also goes by the name Xuanxuan Shangren (玄玄上人).

Hongjun Laozu was also told about in the myth of Chinese New Year. He was the person who captured Nian, the great beast that terrorised the people of China every Chinese New Year.

Every Chinese New Year was a time of suffering and fear for the people of China because of Nian, the great beast. One Chinese New Year's Eve, the monk, Hongjun Laozu, came to a village in China. He saw how everyone looked sad and frightened, so he went to a young man and said, "Why are you so sad? It is Chinese New Year, a time for celebration." The man replied, "Do you not know? Have you not heard about Nian? He comes every New Year and terrorises us, even eats us." The monk said, "I will go and reason with Nian." So off he went, to find Nian.

When Hongjun Laozu came to Nian, he said, "Nian, I have come to reason with you. Stop eating and terrorising the people of China." But Nian said, "Haha. You have delivered yourself to me, old man, so now I will eat you." The man replied, "Oh, but what will that prove? Eating me isn't great! Would you dare to eat the poisonous snakes on the mountains?" "Bah! What's so difficult about that?" So Nian went to the poisonous snakes and ate them up. "How is this? Am I not great?" "At the back of the mountain there are many great beasts. Can you subdue them?" So Nian went and scared all of the dangerous beasts out of the back of the mountain.

"Old man, now it's time for me to eat you!" "Sure, but just wait while I take my clothes off, I will taste much better then". So the old man took his clothes off to reveal his undergarments, which were red. "OK, you can eat me now." But Nian said, "Ah! a red undergarment! I dearly hate red, get out of my sight quickly." "Haha! I knew you were afraid of red!" The old man went into the town on top of Nian and said, "Dear villagers, do not be afraid. Nian is most terrified of red. From now on each house must paste red on each of their doors to prevent Nian creating havoc."

After that, the people started to paste red paper on their front doors before New Year's Day.

After that incident, Nian never came to the village again. Hongjun Laozu eventually captured Nian and after that, Nian retreated to a nearby mountain. The name of the mountain has long been lost over the years.

== See also ==
- Hundun
- Tao
