= Tianzun =

Tianzun (天尊), literally the Lord of Heaven may refer to:

- The three highest Gods in the Taoist pantheon
  - Yuanshi Tianzun or Yuánshǐ Tīanzūn, also known as the Jade Pure One
  - Lingbao Tianzun, also known as the Lord of Lingbao and Shangqing
  - Daode Tianzun or Tàiqīng, also known as Taishang Laojun and Daode Zhizun
- Wenshu Guangfa Tianzun, a character in the classic Chinese novel Investiture of the Gods
