= Daoyi =

Daoyi may refer to:

- Long Daoyi (Chinese: 龙道; born 2003), Chinese diver
- Mazu Daoyi (709–788), Chinese Buddhist philosopher
- Daoyi Zhilüe, book
- Daoyi, a gown worn by Taoist monks

== See also ==
- Daoyin
