= Daode Tianzun =

Deification of Laozi in the Taoist pantheon

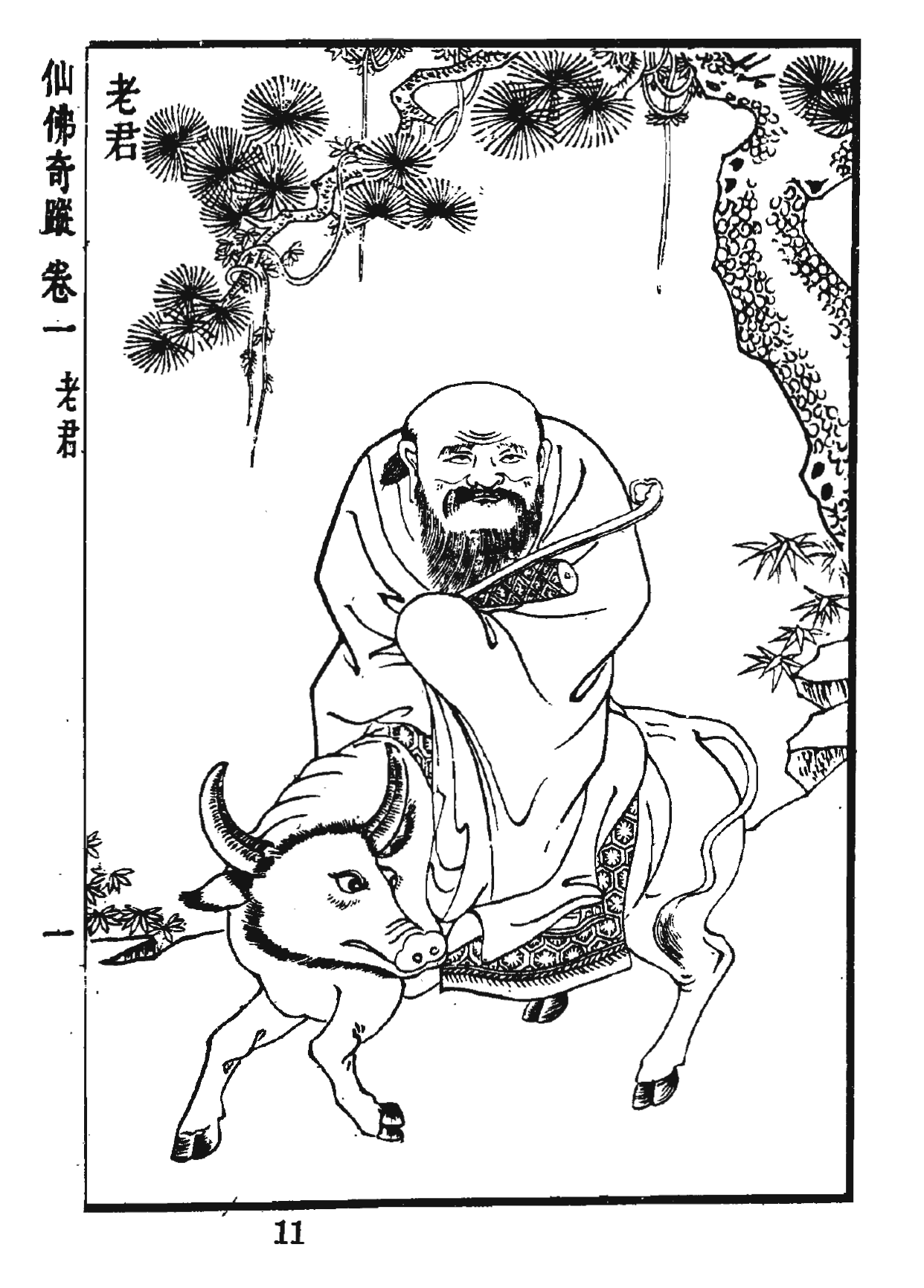
Taishang Laojun

Daode Tianzun (Chinese: 道德天尊; pinyin: dàodé tiānzūn; lit. 'Heavenly Venerable of the Way and its Virtue'), also known as Taishang Laojun (Chinese: 太上老君; pinyin: tàishàng lǎojūn; lit. 'Supreme High Old Lord') is a high Taoist god. He is the Taiqing (Chinese: 太清; pinyin: tàiqīng; lit. 'Supreme Pure One'), one of the Three Pure Ones, the highest immortals of Taoism.

Laozi is regarded to be a manifestation of Daode Tianzun who authored the Dao De Jing (Chinese: 道德經; pinyin: dào dé jīng; lit. 'Classic of the Way and its Virtue'). He is traditionally regarded as the founder of Taoism, intimately connected with "primordial" (or "original") Taoism. Popular ("religious") Taoism typically presents the Jade Emperor as the official head deity. Intellectual ("orthodox") Taoists, such as the Celestial Masters sect, usually present Laozi (Laojun, "Lord Lao") and the Three Pure Ones at the top of the pantheon of gods.

== Legends ==
Taishang Laojun believed to be the true incarnation of the spiritual philosopher Laozi, he was already identified as a personification of the Tao as early as the beginning of the Later Han dynasty. According to the Daozang, Taishang Laojun had manifested many various incarnations to teach living beings, and Laozi is one of his incarnations.

According to the biographies of Laozi collected by Ge Hong in the Biographies of the Immortals (神仙傳), Laozi is said to have been born before Heaven and Earth, after 72 years' stay in his mother's womb. He was born under a plum tree with the ability to speak, and took his surname "Li" after the tree. According to the Inscription in Honor of Laozi, written by Bian Shao, Prime Minister of Chen, in the eighth year of the Yanxi era of the Eastern Han dynasty, Laozi came out of the Vital Breath of Chaos, and is as eternal as the three lights of the Sun, Moon and Stars. During the Tang dynasty, the royal family taking Laozi as its ancestor, worshiped him and honored him with many noble titles.

Although he is ranked below the other two pure ones, he is mentioned in Taoist religious texts more often than the other two. Before he served as an advisor to the Jade Emperor or attending Peach Banquets, he lives in the Great Pure Heaven (Taiqing).

His manifestation anniversary falls on the 15th day of 2nd month of the Chinese lunar calendar.

Daode Tianzun was thought to be able to control what happens in the future.

== Festival ==
For the corresponding article in Chinese Wikipedia, see 道教节.

Since 1996, the Singapore Taoist Federation has celebrated the birthday of Daode Tianzun annually on the 15th day of the second lunar month under the name of "The Taoist Day" (Chinese: 道教节). The celebration aims to promote the teachings of Taoism and Chinese culture, and to raise public awareness and understanding of Taoism.

== See also ==
- Tao & Taoism
- The Supreme Pure One
- Three Pure Ones
- Yuanshi Tianzun
- Hongjun Laozu
