= Three Pure Ones =

Highest Divinities in the Taoist pantheon

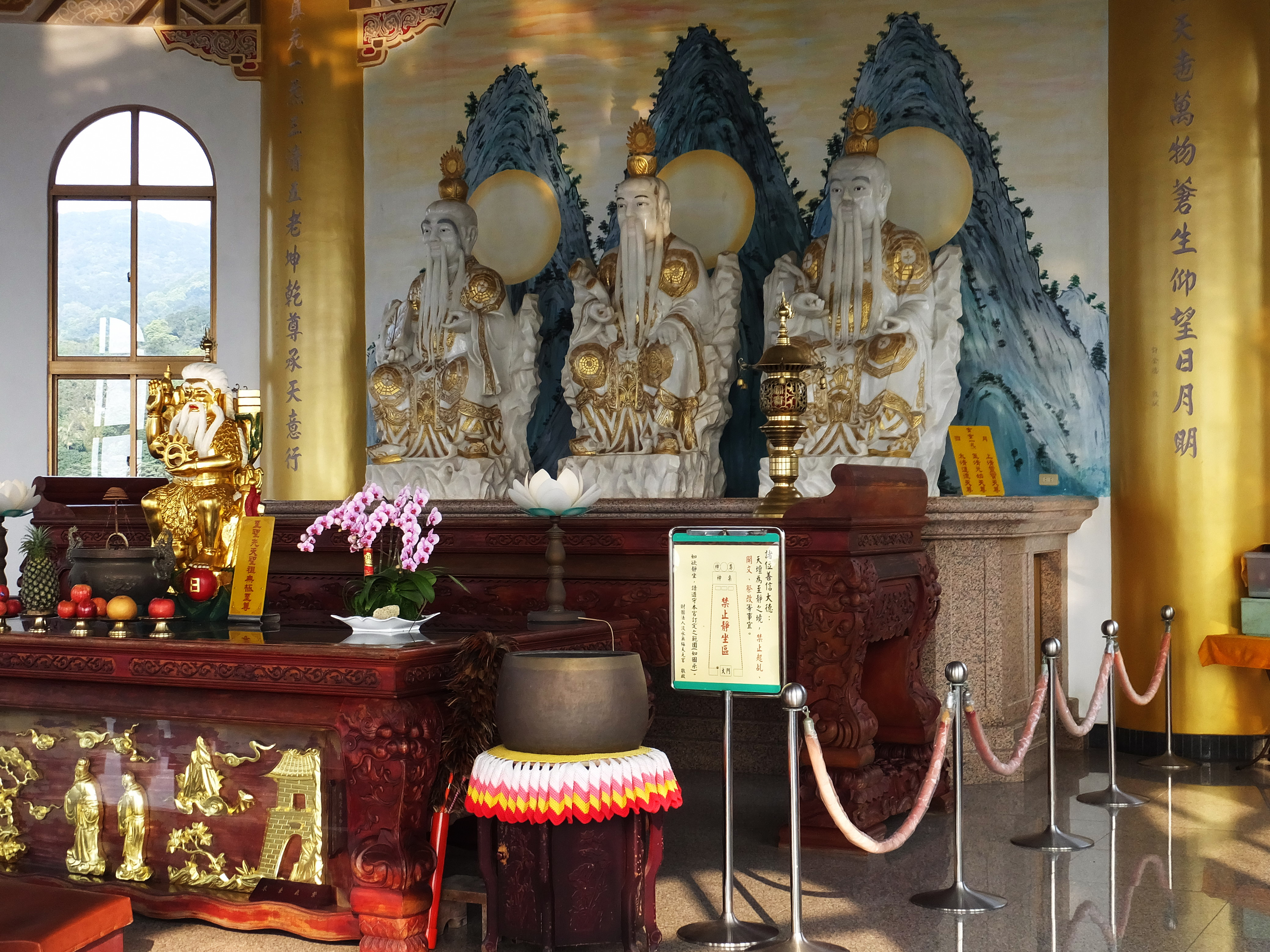
- The Three Pure Ones
- Chinese: 三清
Transcriptions
Standard Mandarin
- Hanyu Pinyin: Sānqīng
Yue: Cantonese
- Jyutping: Saam1 Cing1

The Three Pure Ones (Chinese: 三清), also translated as the Three Pure Pellucid Ones, the Three Purities, the Three Pristine Ones, the Three Clarities, or the Three Divine Teachers, are the three highest gods in the Taoist pantheon. They are:

- Jade Purity (Chinese: 玉清) ━ Original and Primordial Heavenly Lord (元始天尊)
- Upper Purity (Chinese: 上清) ━ Divine Treasures Heavenly Lord (靈寶天尊)
- Grand Purity (Chinese: 太清) ━ Heavenly Lord of Way and Virtue (道德天尊)

They are considered the primordial embodiments of the Energy of The One (Chinese: 一炁), which is another name for Tao. There is a famous saying in Taoism:

"The Energy of The One transforms into the Three Pure Ones. (一炁化三清)"

This saying can refer to a starting scene in Taoist creation mythology, meaning that in the beginning of the universe, there was nothing else but Tao, namely the Energy of The One. It transformed into or emanated three primordial Divinities, who are the Three Pure Ones.

Additionally, the saying can also refer to a very high level of Taoist practice, which is described as:

"The Five Types of Energies combine and become the Energy of The One; the Energy of The One then transforms into the Three Pure Ones. (五行合爲一炁，一炁化作三清)"

This refers to a pivotal phase in Taoist internal cultivation that when the Five Types of Energies are perfectly mixed and become the Energy of The One, the Energy of The One then transforms into or manifests the Three Pure Ones.

The saying has double meanings because according to Taoist cosmology, a human body is a small universe, while the universe is a grand human body; therefore, whatever happened during the creation of the universe can also happen within everyone's body.

The Three Pure Ones are considered the sources of all existence in the universe and are believed to have power over time. They were also understood as representing the Past, Present, and Future by some.

According to Taoist mythology, the Three Pure Ones reside in the highest heavens called the Three Purest Heavens (Chinese: 三清天), which are:

- Jade Purity Heaven (Chinese: 玉清天), where Original and Primordial Heavenly Lord resides.
- Upper Purity Heaven (Chinese: 上清天), where Divine Treasures Heavenly Lord resides.
- Grand Purity Heaven (Chinese: 太清天), where Heavenly Lord of Way and Virtue resides.
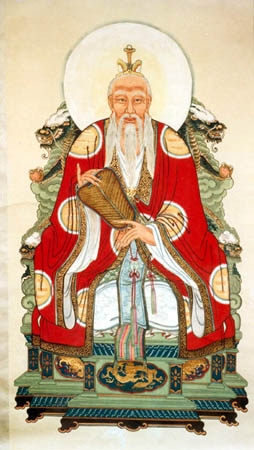
Heavenly Lord of Way and Virtue

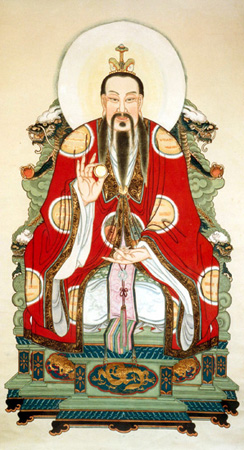
Jade Purity, Original and Primordial Heavenly Lord

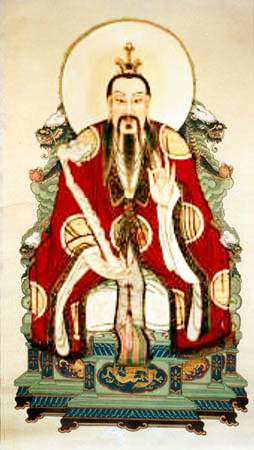
Upper Purity, Divine Treasures Heavenly Lord

The Three Purities
Grand Purity	Jade Purity	Upper Purity
Heavenly Lord of Way and Virtue	Original and Primordial Heavenly Lord	Divine Treasures Heavenly Lord
Often depicted as holding a fan, sometimes holding other objects, and sitting on a throne	Holding a pearl made of mixed energies, and sitting on a throne made of treasures	Holding a Wish-granting scepter, and sitting on a throne

== In Taoism ==
From the Taoist classic Tao Te Ching, it was held that "The Tao produced One; One produced Two; Two produced Three; Three produced All things." It is generally agreed by Taoist scholars that Tao produced One means Wuji produced Taiji, and One produced Two means Taiji produced Yin and Yang [or Liangyi (兩儀) in scholastic terms]. However, the subject of how Two produced Three has remained a popular debate among Taoist scholars. Most scholars believe that it refers to the Interaction between Yin and Yang, with the presence of Chi, or life force.

In religious Taoism, the theory of how Tao produces One, Two, and Three is also explained. In Tao produces One—Wuji produces Taiji, which represents the Great Tao, embodied by Hundun (Chinese: 混沌無極元始天王; pinyin: Hùndùn Wújí Yuánshǐ Tiānwáng, "Heavenly King of the Never-ending Primordial Beginning") at a time of pre-Creation, manifesting into the first of the Taoist Trinity, Yuanshi Tianzun. Yuanshi Tianzun oversees the earliest phase of creation of the Universe, and is henceforth known as Dàobǎo (道寶) "Treasure of the Tao". In One produces Two—Taiji produces Yin Yang, Yuanshi Tianzun manifests into Lingbao Tianzun who separated the Yang from the Yin, the clear from the murky, and classified the elements into their rightful groups. Therefore, he is also known as Jīngbǎo (經寶) "Treasure of the Law/Scripture". While Jīng in popular understanding means "scriptures", in this context it also means "passing through" [the phase of Creation] and the Laws of Nature of how things are meant to be. In the final phase of Creation, Daode Tianzun is manifested from Língbăo Tiānzūn to bring civilization and preach the Law to all living beings. Therefore, he is also known as Shībǎo (師寶) "Treasure of the Master".

Each of the Three Pure Ones represents both a primordial deity and a heaven. Yuanshi Tianzun rules the first heaven, Yu-Qing, which is found in the Jade Mountain. The entrance to this heaven is named the Golden Door. "He is the source of all truth, as the sun is the source of all light". Lingbao Tianzun rules over the heaven of Shang-Qing. Daode Tianzun rules over the heaven of Tai-Qing. The Three Pure Ones are often depicted as throned elders.

Schools of Taoist thought developed around each of these deities. Taoist Alchemy was a large part of these schools, as each of the Three Pure Ones represented one of the three essential fields of the body: jing, qi and shen. The congregation of all three Pure Ones resulted in the return to Tao.

The first Pure One is universal or heavenly chi. The second Pure One is human plane chi, and the third Pure One is earth chi. Heavenly chi includes the chi or energy of all the planets, stars and constellations as well as the energy of God (the force of creation and universal love). Human plane chi is the energy that exists on the surface of our planet and sustains human life, and the earth force includes all of the forces inside the planet as well as the five elemental forces.

As the Three Pure Ones are manifestations of Primordial Celestial Energy, they are formless. But to illustrate their role in Creation, they are often portrayed as elderly deities robed in the three basic colours from which all colours originated: Red, Blue and Yellow (or Green) depending on personal interpretation of colour origins by additive or subtractive means. Each of them holds onto a divine object associated with their task. Yuánshǐ Tiānzūn is usually depicted holding the Pearl of Creation, signifying his role in recreating the Universe. The Ruyi held by Lingbao Tianzun represents authority: the second phase of Creation where the Yang was separated from the Yin and the Law of Things was ordered in place. Lingbao Tianzun then took his seat on the left of Yuanshi Tianzun. Later, when all was complete, Daode Tianzun took his place on the right, with the fan symbolizing the completion of Creation, and the act of fanning representing the spreading of Tao to all Mankind.

== Original and Primordial Heavenly Lord ==
Original and Primordial Heavenly Lord (Chinese: 元始天尊), also translated as "The Universally Honored One of Origin", "Lord of Primordial Beginning", or "Primal Celestial One", is the Jade Purity (Chinese: 玉清) among the Three Pure Ones.

== Divine Treasures Heavenly Lord ==
Divine Treasures Heavenly Lord (靈寶天尊), also translated as "The Universally Honoured One of Divinities and Treasures", "Heavenly Lord of Spiritual Treasures", or "Lord of the Numinous Treasure", is the Upper Purity (Chinese: 上清) among the Three Pure Ones.

Divine Treasures Heavenly Lord is associated with yin and yang and serves as the custodian of the scriptures. He also calculates time and divides it into different epochs.

== Heavenly Lord of Way and Virtue ==
Heavenly Lord of Way and Virtue (道德天尊), also translated as "The Universally Honored One of Tao and Virtues" or "The Way-and-Its-Power Celestial One", is the Grand Purity (Chinese: 太清) among the Three Pure Ones. He is also known as the Ultra Supreme Elder Lord (太上老君).

According to Taoist scriptures, Heavenly Lord of Way and Virtue has countless manifestations, and one of them is the historical Lao Tzu, the author of the Scripture of Way and Virtue. He is often depicted as an elder with white hair and beard.

== Syncretic beliefs ==
Some believe that another Taoist trinity of gods evolved into the Pure Ones.

Beliefs in the Jade Emperor were taken from other Chinese religious traditions and he was seen as an assistant deity who managed all of the creation.

== See also ==
- Ahuric triad
- Chinese folk religion
- Jade Emperor
- Quanzhen Taoism
- Trimurti
- Trinity
- Taoism
- Taoist Canon
- Zhengyi Taoism
