= Yuanshi Tianzun =

Taoist deity

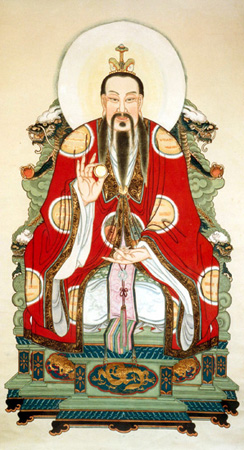
Yuanshi Tianzun, the Celestial Venerable of the Primordial Beginning

Yuanshi Tianzun (Chinese: 元始天尊; pinyin: Yuánshǐ Tīanzūn), the Celestial Venerable of the Primordial Beginning or the Primeval Lord of Heaven, is one of the highest deities of Taoism. He is one of the Three Pure Ones (Chinese: 三清; pinyin: Sānqīng) and is also known as the Jade Pure One (Chinese: 玉清; pinyin: Yùqīng). He resides in the Great Web or the Heaven of Jade Purity. It is believed that he exists at the beginning of the universe as the purest breath. He then created Heaven and Earth.

== In Taoist mythology ==
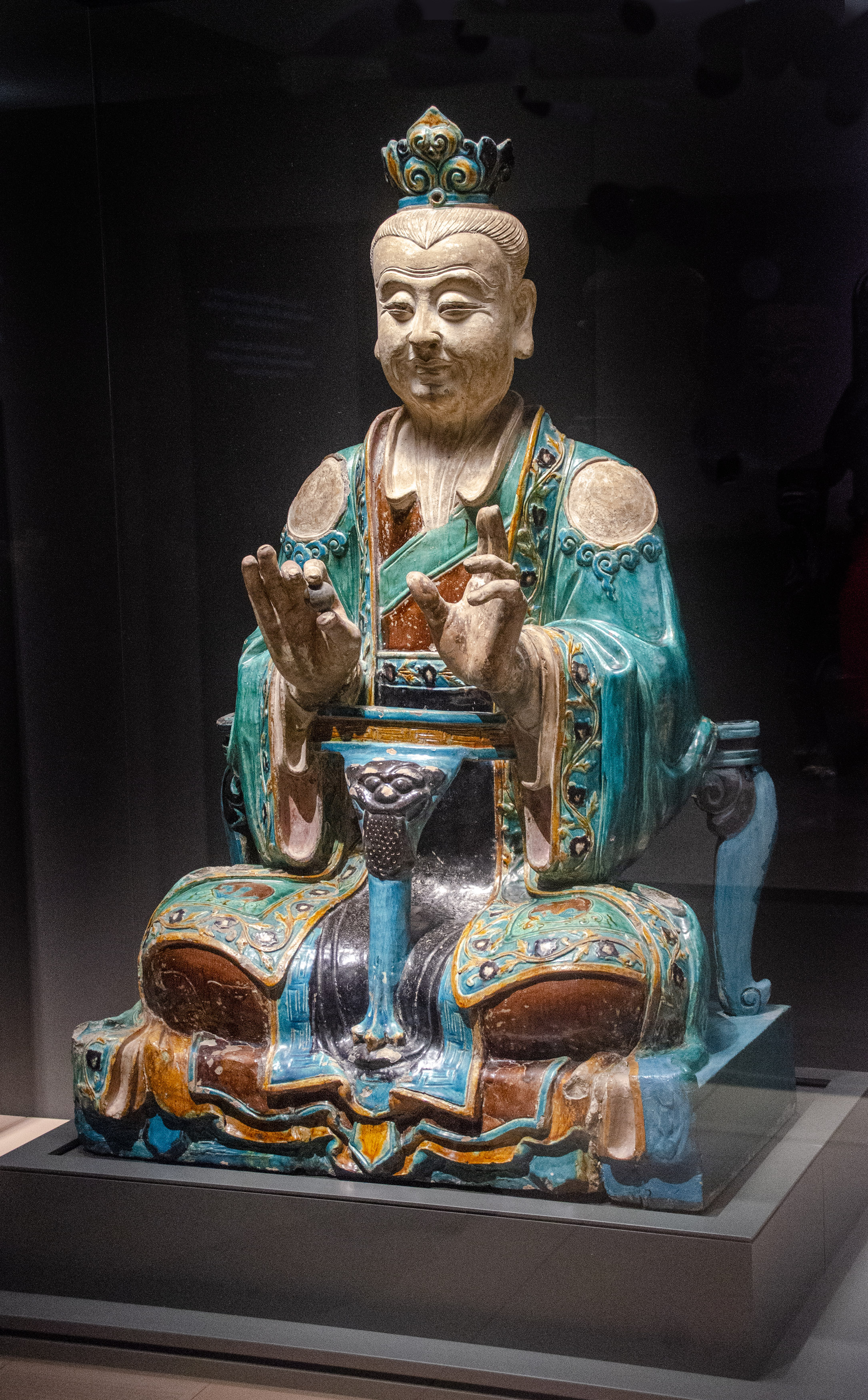
Ceramic sculpture of Yuanshi Tianzun, Ming dynasty (1488–1644)

He once was the supreme administrator of Heaven, but later entrusted that task to his assistant Yuhuang, the Jade Emperor. Yuhuang took over the administrative duties of Yuanshi Tianzun and became the overseer of both Heaven and Earth. At the beginning of each age, Yuanshi Tianzun transports the Lingpao ching (or "Yuanshi Ching"), the Scriptures of the Magic Jewel, to his students (who are lesser deities), who in turn instruct mankind in the teachings of the Tao.

Yuanshi Tianzun is said to be without beginning and the most supreme of all beings. He is in fact, a representation of the principle of all being. From him all things arose. He is eternal, limitless, and without form.

Yuanshi Tianzun was thought to be able to control the present.

== Role in Fengshen Yanyi ==
In the famous 16th-century "gods-and-demons" novel Investiture of the Gods, Yuanshi Tianzun is a superior man who has maintained his will for generations. He would be known as the master of the Kunlun Mountains, in which he had many disciples—one of such being Jiang Ziya. In time, Yuanshi Tianzun would tell Jiang that it would be time to head down to the world in order to attain a level of wealth and honor. Because Jiang Ziya was destined to assist in the creation of the new Zhou dynasty—as like Nezha—Yuanshi Tianzun would stay loyal to heaven's will and effectively send Jiang away to his new destiny. After telling Jiang what to do through a poetic format, Yuanshi Tianzun says his final words of farewell to his student.

== Worship ==
Taoists claim that sacrifices offered to Yuanshi Tianzun by the king predate the Xia dynasty. The surviving archaeological record shows that by the Shang dynasty, the shoulder blades of sacrificed oxen were used to send questions or communication through fire and smoke to the divine realm, a practice known as scapulimancy. The heat would cause the bones to crack and royal diviners would interpret the marks as Yuanshi Tianzun's response to the king. Inscriptions used for divination were buried into special orderly pits while those that were for practice or records were buried in common middens after use. Under Yuanshi Tianzun or his later names, the deity received sacrifices from the ruler of China in every Chinese dynasty annually at a great Temple of Heaven in the imperial capital. Following the principles of Chinese geomancy, this would always be located in the southern quarter of the city. (Note: For instance, the Classic of History records the Duke of Zhou building an altar in the southern part of Luo.) During the ritual, a completely healthy bull would be slaughtered and presented as an animal sacrifice to Yuanshi Tianzun. (Note: Although the Duke of Zhou is presented as sacrificing two.) The Book of Rites states the sacrifice should occur on the "longest day" on a round-mound altar. The altar would have three tiers: the highest for Yuanshi Tianzun and the Son of Heaven; the second-highest for the sun and moon; and the lowest for the natural gods such as the stars, clouds, rain, wind, and thunder.

The ten stages of the ritual were:

1. Welcoming deities
2. Offering of jade and silk
3. Offering of sacrificial food
4. First offering of wine
5. Second offering of wine
6. Last offering of wine
7. Retreat of civil dancers and entry of military dancers
8. Performance of the military dance
9. Farewell to deities
10. Burning of sacrificial articles

Yuanshi Tianzun is never represented with either images or idols. Instead, in the center building of the Temple of Heaven, in a structure called the "Imperial Vault of Heaven", a "spirit tablet" (神位, or shénwèi) inscribed with the name of Yuanshi Tianzun is stored on the throne, Huangtian Shangdi (皇天上帝). During an annual sacrifice, the emperor would carry these tablets to the north part of the Temple of Heaven, a place called the "Prayer Hall For Good Harvests", and place them on that throne.

The highest heaven in some historic Chinese religious organizations was the "Great Web" which was sometimes said to be where Yuanshi Tianzun lived.

== See also ==
- Daode Tianzun
- Lingbao Tianzun
- Tongtian Jiaozhu
- Jade Emperor
