= Lingbao Tianzun =

Taoist deity

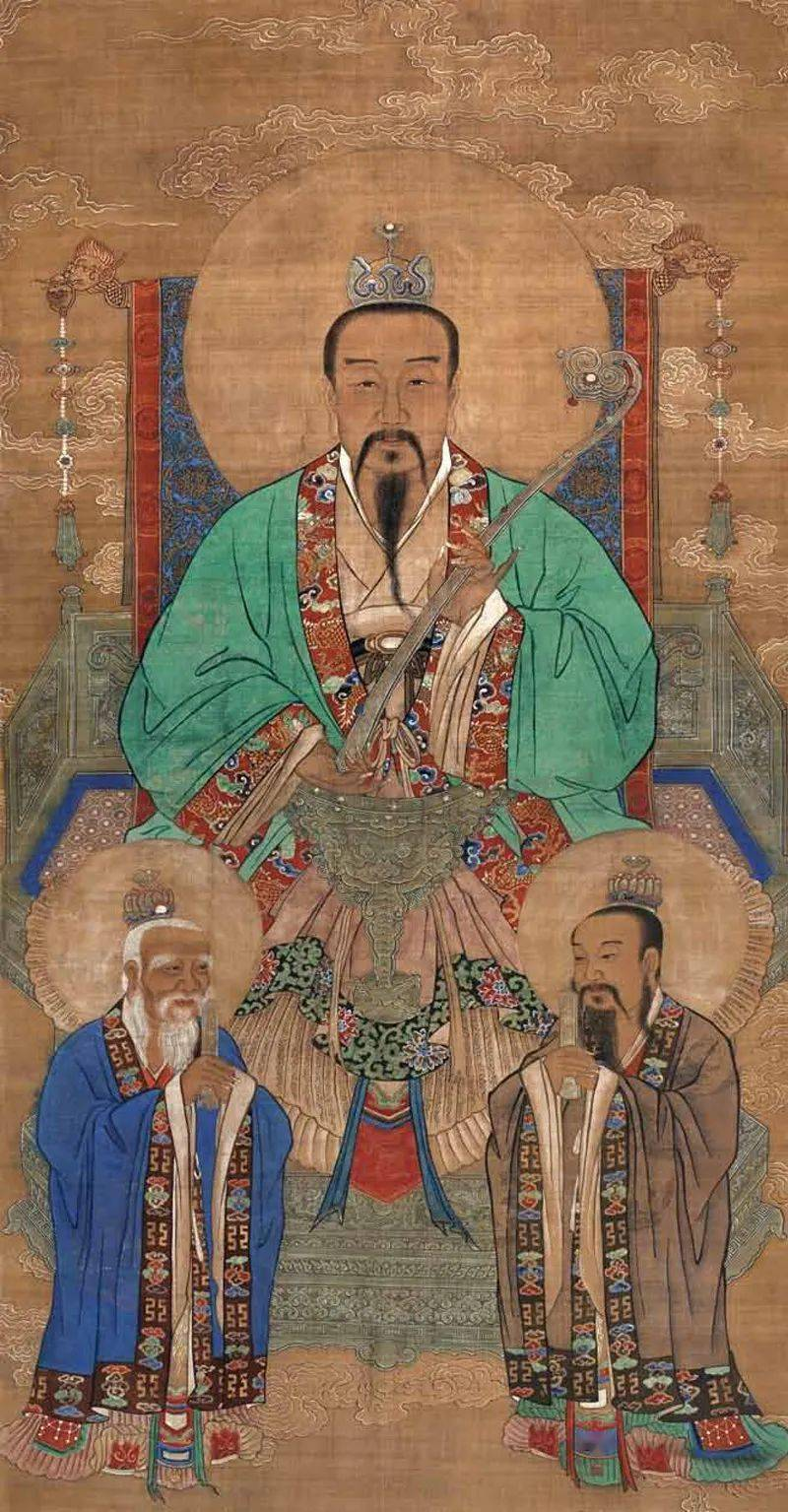
- Traditional Chinese: 靈寶天尊
- Simplified Chinese: 灵宝天尊
- Literal meaning: Heavenly Lord of Spiritual Treasure(s)
Transcriptions
Standard Mandarin
- Hanyu Pinyin: Língbǎo Tiānzūn
- Wade–Giles: Lien-pao T‘ien-tsun

Shangqing
- Chinese: 上清
- Literal meaning: The High-&-Clear [One]
Transcriptions
Standard Mandarin
- Hanyu Pinyin: Shǎngqīng
- Wade–Giles: Shang-ch‘ing

Lingbao Tianzun, translated as Divine Treasures Heavenly Lord, Spiritual Treasures Heavenly Lord or The Universally Honoured One of Divinities And Treasures is a Taoist god. He is the Upper Purity among the Three Pure Ones.

He is thought to be able to control everything that goes on in the present. Often invoked during Taoist funeral rituals, Taiyi Jiuku Tianzun is described as an avatar of Lingbao Tianzun, and able to manifest himself in any form to lead souls to paradise.

== Record ==
According to the Yunji Qiqian (Seven Bamboo Tablets of the Cloudy Satchel), Lingbao Tianzun is one of the manifestations of the Great Dao, and is described as "the essence of the Jade Emperor (Yuchen), the purple mist of nine auspicious clouds, radiant with jade brilliance and flowing with golden light. He embodies the convergence of transformation and beauty, containing and nurturing the primordial spirit. He was conceived within his mother's womb and took human form."

The Lingbao Lüeji (Brief Records of Lingbao) further elaborates: "The Supreme Great Dao Lord, in the first year of the Kaihuang era, was conceived in the Western Green Jade Kingdom (Lüna Yuguo) and carried in the womb of the Hong family. His divine spirit coalesced in the jade-like womb for three thousand seven hundred years, after which he was born in that kingdom, at the Floating Lo Mountain (Fuluo Zhi Yue) in the Danxuan Valley. His name was Qi Du, with the courtesy name Shang Kaiyuan. As he grew, he became enlightened to the true Dao and aspired to the highest path. He sat beneath a withered mulberry tree, meditating deeply for a hundred days, until Yuanshi Tianzun (the Celestial Worthy of Primordial Beginning) descended and bestowed upon him the ten great volumes of the Lingbao Mahayana teachings."

== Temples ==
The Dongxuan Palace in the Zhujia'ao Valley beside Mt Mian in Shanxi is dedicated to the Lord of Lingbao. His statue in its main hall is covered by a ring of light; his eyes are thought to "contain the mysteries of the universe".

== Bibliography ==
- "Must-See on Mianshan Mountain", Official site, Beijing: China Internet Information Center, 27 July 2010.
