= Songzi Niangniang =

Taoist fertility goddess

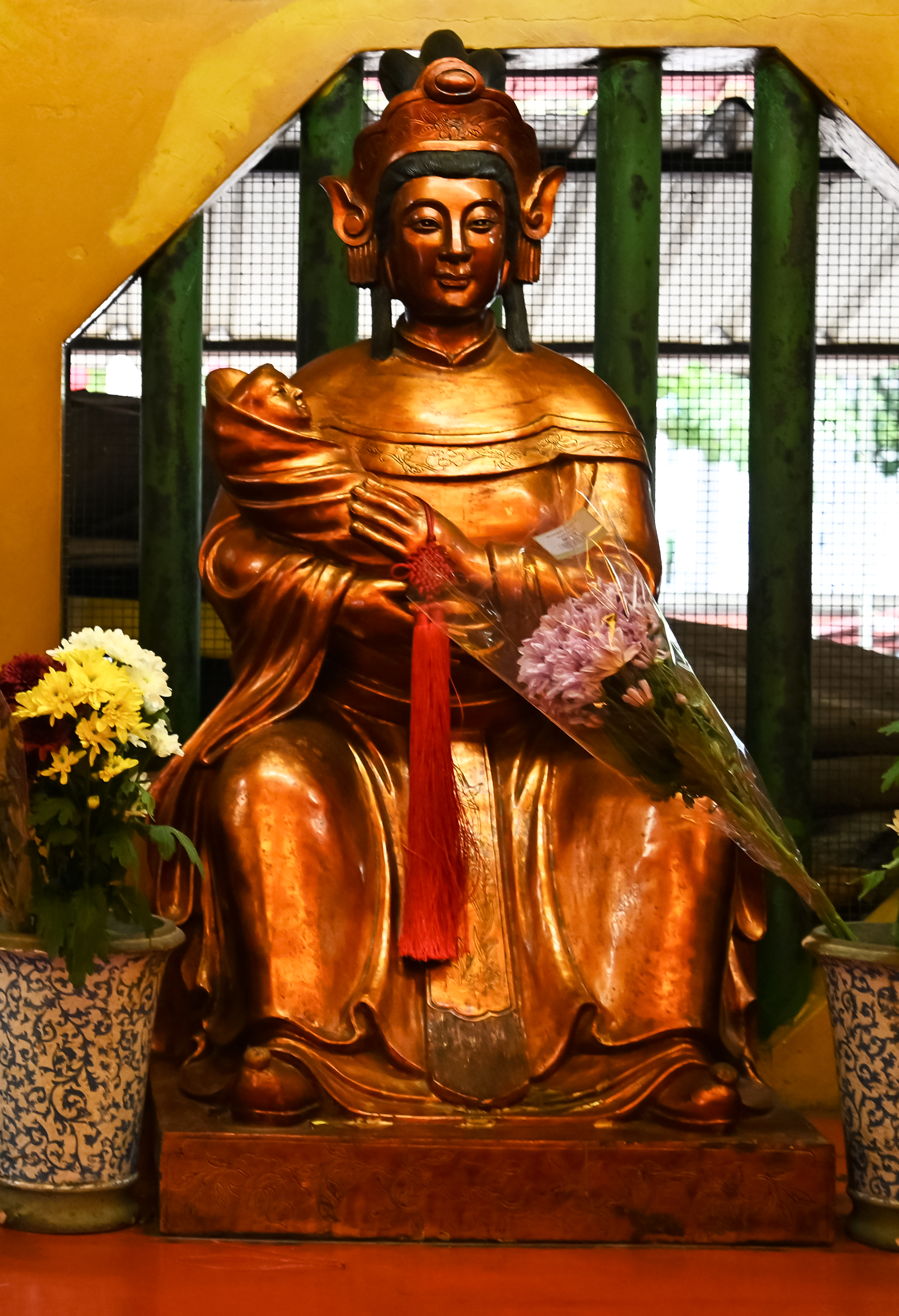
Songzi Niangniang (送子娘娘) altar in Singapore.

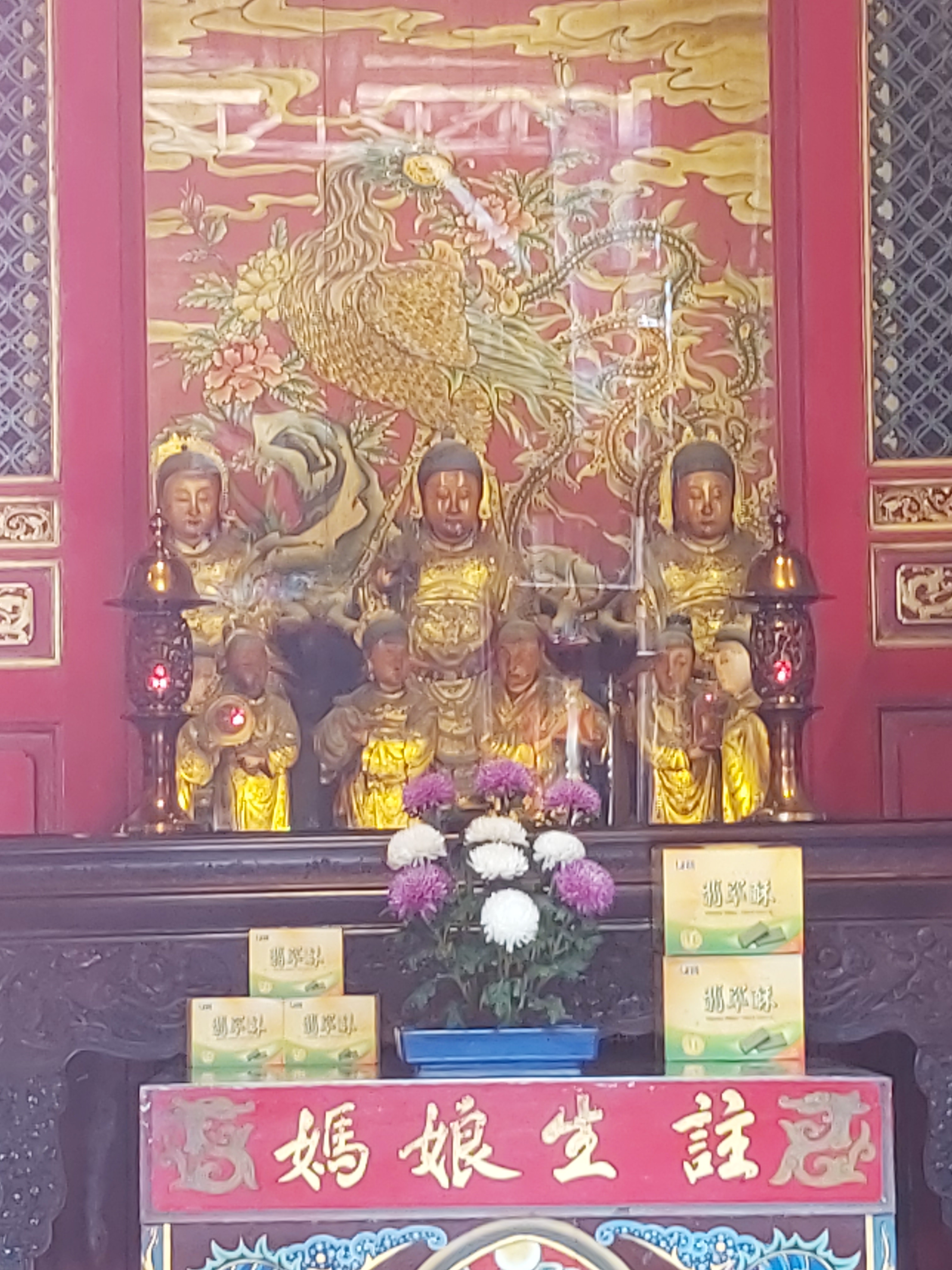
Zhusheng Niangniang (註生娘娘) altar in Bangka Lungshan Temple, Taipei.

Songzi Niangniang (送子娘娘, "The Maiden Who Brings Children"), also referred to in Taiwan as Zhusheng Niangniang (註生娘娘), is a Taoist fertility goddess. She has been identified with many historical figures. She is often depicted as Guan Yin herself in drawings, or alternatively as an attendant of Guan Yin; Guan Yin herself is also often referred to as "Guan Yin Who Brings Children". She is depicted as an empress figure, much like Xi Wangmu and Mazu. She is often portrayed as an attendant to Bixia Yuanjun.

== Legends ==
There are different stories and legends of different Chinese goddesses of fertility in different parts of China. Zhusheng Niangniang is a goddess figure derived from three goddesses recorded in the Ming dynasty novel Investiture of the Gods. The three goddesses are younger sisters of the god of wealth Zhao Gongming, named Zhao Yunxiao, Zhao Qiongxiao and Zhao Bixiao. Later on, the three goddesses were combined into three in one, known as Zhusheng Niangniang.

In Taoist painting and sculpture, she is a goddess of birth and childcare is in charge of pregnancy, delivery of infant, protection of mother and child. She holds a book and a brush reflecting the Chinese practise of recording new born child in the family lineage records. Many temples have a shrine dedicated to her in one of the side halls and she may sometimes appear together with other goddess of fertility.
