= Yunxiao Niangniang =

Goddess in Chinese folk religion

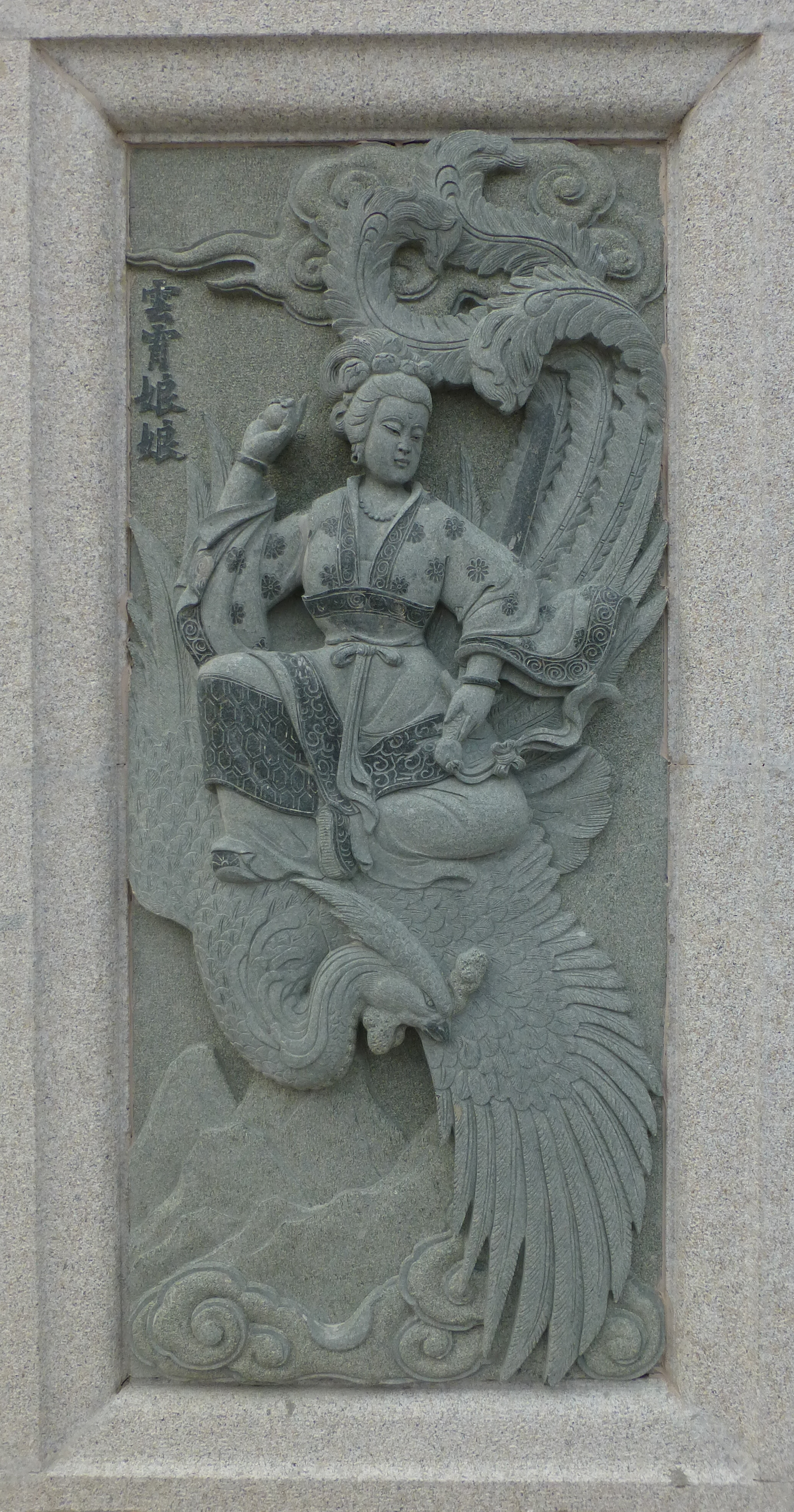
Yunxiao Niangniang

Yunxiao Niangniang (Chinese: 雲宵娘娘; lit. 'Lady of the Cloud Firmament'), also known as Zhao Yunxiao, is a character in the classic 16th-century Chinese novel Fengshen Yanyi. She is worshipped as a goddess of childbirth in Chinese folk religion. She is the oldest of the Sanxiao Shengmu (Holy mothers of three skies, 三霄聖母) or Sanxiao Niangniang (Ladies of three stars, 三霄娘娘).

== Legends ==
=== In Fengshen Yanyi ===
According to Fengshen Yanyi, she is one of the first-generation disciples of the Jie Sect under Tongtian Jiaozhu. As the eldest of the Three Celestial Maidens, she is renowned for her kindness. Among the disciples of both the Chan and Jie sects, she possesses the deepest cultivation and the greatest magical power, having reached the level of a quasi-saint. Even Randeng Daoren, the senior immortal of the Chan Sect, does not dare to confront her. Her Nine Bends Yellow River Formation is so powerful that it requires the combined efforts of the Moral Heavenly Venerable and the Primordial Heavenly Venerable to break it. She lives peacefully on Sanxian Island with her two sisters, Qiongxiao and Bixiao, where they cultivate the Dao. Her divine mount is the Qingluan bird, and her treasures include the Hunyuan Gold Gourd (混元金斗) and the Golden Dragon Scissors (金蛟剪). She is said to have attained enlightenment before the creation of heaven and earth. Their senior brother is Zhao Gongming of Mount Emei. After Zhao Gongming is killed by Lu Ya Zhenren, she seeks revenge and joins the war alongside the Grand Preceptor Wen Zhong.

The three sisters, together with their fellow disciples Caiyun Fairy and Hanzhi Fairy, battle the disciples of the Chan Sect. They set up the Grand Nine-Curves Yellow River Formation (Note: The "Nine Bends of the Yellow River Formation" is a legendary battle formation that appears in ancient Chinese literature and mythology. It is typically described as a formation with nine winding curves representing the meandering course of the Yellow River. It is often portrayed as a powerful formation used to defeat enemies. The formation reflects the cultural significance of the Yellow River, one of China's most important rivers, which is also known for its winding course, shifting silt, and frequent floods.) (九曲黄河阵), capturing Yang Jian, Jinzha, and Muzha. They also capture the Twelve Golden Immortals and Lu Ya Zhenren, using the Grand Nine-Curves Yellow River Formation to strip away over a thousand years of their accumulated cultivation. As no disciple of the Chan Sect is able to break the formation, both Yuanshi Tianzun and Laozi descend to aid their disciples and successfully dismantle it. During the ensuing battle, Yunxiao is crushed beneath the Qiankun Diagram (乾坤图), which is deployed by Laozi through his Yellow Turban Warriors (黄巾力士), while her two sisters are also killed.

Following the Zhou victory, Jiang Ziya confers upon the three sisters the collective divine title of "Ganying Suishi Xiangu" (感应随世仙姑, lit. "Celestial Ladies Who Respond to the World"). Together they become known as the "Three Celestial Maidens" (Sanxiao Niangniang) and are worshipped in Chinese folk religion as goddesses of fertility and childbirth. They are also revered as protectors against smallpox and childhood diseases.

=== Legend of Sanxiao Hall ===
According to local legend, during the Yuan dynasty, a wealthy and charitable man named Zhang Yuanwai lived near Changchun Temple in Anyang with his wife, Nie. The couple were widely respected for their generosity, supporting the construction of temples, bridges, and roads, providing aid to the poor, and funding medical care.

Although the couple remained childless, Nie dreamed of a celestial maiden who presented her with a baby girl, explaining that their lifelong acts of charity had moved the heavens. About a month later, Nie unexpectedly became pregnant despite her old age and eventually gave birth to a daughter resembling the child from her dream. Believing the celestial maiden to be one of the Three Celestial Maidens (Sanxiao Niangniang), Zhang made offerings at Sanxiao Hall in gratitude.

The story spread throughout the region, leading many people to pray to the Three Celestial Maidens for children. According to the legend, however, they granted children only to those who were genuinely virtuous, while refusing the prayers of corrupt or immoral individuals.

== Incident of Sanxiaodong Massacre ==
According to local accounts, Sanxiao Cave on Mount Emei, formerly a Taoist sanctuary dedicated to the Three Celestial Maidens, was the site of a mysterious incident in 1937 known as the Sanxiaodong Massacre.

The incident reportedly occurred during a celebration marking the appointment of the monk Yankong as abbot of Sanxiao Cave. While worshippers were conducting religious rituals, a sudden explosion occurred inside the cave, killing 76 people. Local authorities from Emei and Fushun investigated the incident but were unable to determine its cause. The cave was subsequently closed, the victims were buried nearby, and the Sanxiao temple was demolished. The tragedy attracted widespread attention in Sichuan, and was reported by local newspapers. In the late 1980s, Chinese explorer Yi Ruilong conducted several on-site investigations in an attempt to determine the cause of the incident.

== Worship ==
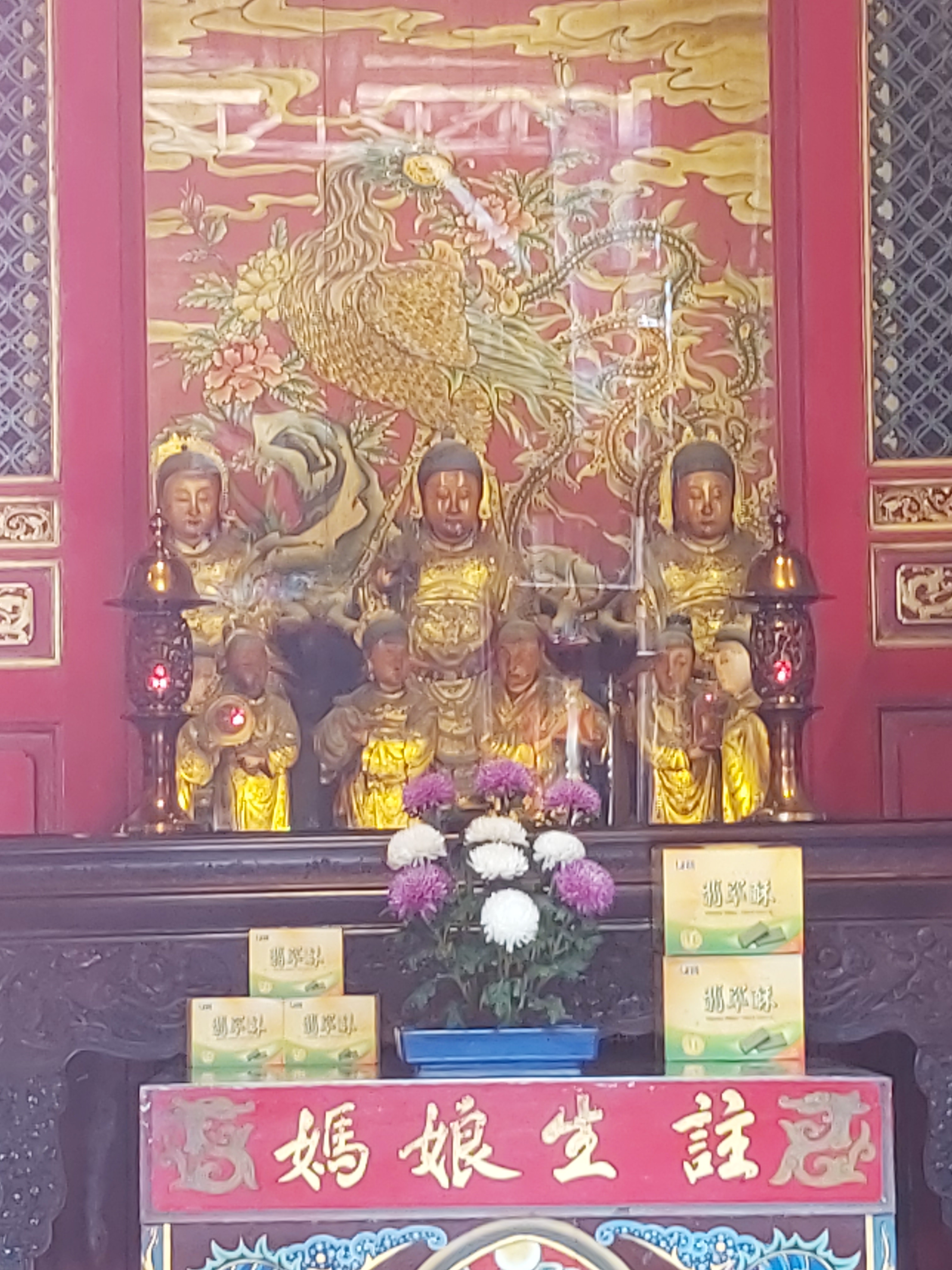
Zhusheng Niangniang in Mengjia Longshan Temple, Taipei

In Taiwanese folk religion, the Three Celestial Maidens are often merged into a single deity known as Zhusheng Niangniang.

The Three Celestial Maidens are enshrined in the Sanxiao Hall of Changchun Temple in Anyang. According to local belief, they control the Hunyuan Gold Gourd, which determines the destinies of all people regardless of status or wealth. They are widely venerated as goddesses of fertility and childbirth, and have inspired numerous local legends and traditions.

According to local tradition in Qinhuangdao, Hebei, the Three Celestial Maidens built a temple in honor of their senior brother, Zhao Gongming, after he was appointed the God of Wealth by Jiang Ziya. The settlement that later developed around the temple eventually became known as Cai Shen Temple Street (财神庙街).
