= Qiongxiao Niangniang =

Chinese goddess of childbirth

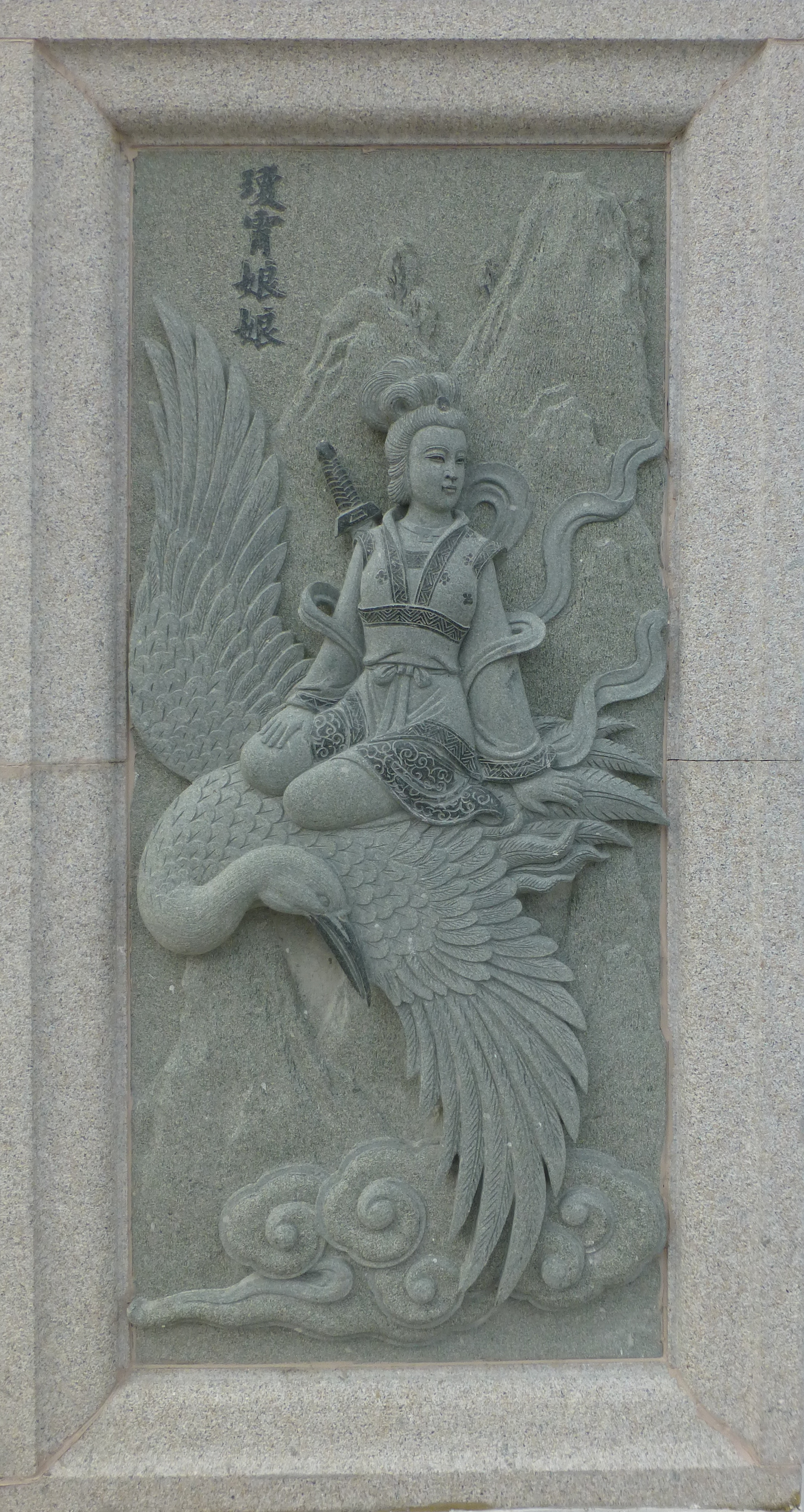
Qiongxiao Niangniang

Qiongxiao Niangniang (Chinese: 瓊宵娘娘; lit. 'Lady of the Jade Firmament'), also known as Zhao Qiongxiao, is a Chinese goddess who first appeared as a fictional character in the Ming dynasty novel Investiture of the Gods (Fengshen Yanyi). Along with her sisters, Yunxiao and Bixiao, she later became a deity in Chinese folk religion, where the three are worshipped collectively as the Sanxiao Niangniang (Three Celestial Maidens).

== Legend ==
According to Fengshen Yanyi, Qiongxiao is one of the first-generation disciples of the Jie Sect under Tongtian Jiaozhu. She is the middle of the Three Celestial Maidens and resides on Sanxian Island with her sisters, Yunxiao and Bixiao, where they cultivate the Dao. Her divine mount is a swan, and she shares two powerful treasures with her sisters: the Hunyuan Gold Gourd (混元金斗) and the Golden Dragon Scissors (金蛟剪). Their senior brother is Zhao Gongming of Mount Emei. After Zhao Gongming was killed by Lu Ya Zhenren, Qiongxiao was the first of the three sisters to urge Yunxiao to avenge their brother. When Zhao Gongming's body was returned to the Shang camp, she broke into tears and nearly fainted from grief. She then joined her sisters in supporting the Grand Preceptor Wen Zhong in the war against the Zhou forces.

Together with her sisters, Qiongxiao helps establish the Grand Nine-Curves Yellow River Formation (九曲黄河阵), which captures several Chan Sect immortals and strips the Twelve Golden Immortals of much of their accumulated cultivation. During the subsequent battles, Qiongxiao is depicted as particularly agile. Unlike Yunxiao, who is struck by Jiang Ziya's God-Slaying Whip, and Bixiao, who is bitten by Yang Jian's celestial hound, Qiongxiao avoids suffering either injury. After Yuanshi Tianzun and Laozi dismantle the formation, Xianhe Tongzi (the White Crane Boy), acting under Yuanshi Tianzun's command, kills Qiongxiao with the Three Treasures Wish-Granting Scepter. Some later versions state that the blow shattered her skull. Following the Zhou victory, Jiang Ziya appoints the three sisters collectively as the "Ganying Suishi Xiangu" (感应随世仙姑, lit. "Celestial Ladies Who Respond to the World"). They later become widely worshipped in Chinese folk religion as the Three Celestial Maidens.

According to local folklore in Shaanxi, Qiongxiao and her sisters are associated with three peaks on Mount Taibai: Qiongxiao Mountain (琼霄山), Yunxiao Mountain, and Bixiao Mountain. Local tradition holds that, after the sisters were defeated during the Battle of the Nine-Curves Yellow River Formation, they were transformed into these three mountain peaks. The peaks face the main summit, Baxiantai (拔仙台), in a bowing posture, symbolizing their submission after the battle.

== Worship ==
In Chinese folk religion, Qiongxiao is worshipped together with her two sisters as the Sanxiao Niangniang (三霄娘娘; "Three Celestial Maidens") or Sanxiangu (三仙姑; "Three Immortal Maidens"). In Fengshen Yanyi, the sisters use the Hunyuan Jindou (混元金斗). In later folk belief, the Hunyuan Jindou came to be seen as a symbol of childbirth. It was believed that all people, including gods and emperors, had to pass through it before being born.

Because of this belief, Qiongxiao and her sisters became popular goddesses of fertility and childbirth. They are worshipped in temples across mainland China, Taiwan, Singapore, and Malaysia. People pray to them for children, safe pregnancies, and the protection of infants. In many places, the Three Celestial Maidens are also identified or merged with Zhusheng Niangniang (註生娘娘) and Songzi Niangniang (送子娘娘), who are also associated with childbirth and children.

Qiongxiao later became an officially invoked deity in Daoist ritual. In Zhengyi Dao ritual texts, including the Zhengyi Wanglao Guoguan Biao Ke (正一王姥過關表科), she and her sisters are invoked to protect mothers during childbirth and help children safely pass the spiritual dangers of early childhood.
