= Caishen =

Chinese god of prosperity

- Traditional Chinese: 財神
- Simplified Chinese: 财神
- Literal meaning: "God of Wealth"
Transcriptions
Standard Mandarin
- Hanyu Pinyin: Cáishén
- Wade–Giles: Ts'ai^{2}-shen^{2}
- IPA: [tsʰǎɪ.ʂə̌n]
Yue: Cantonese
- Yale Romanization: Chòih-sàhn
- Jyutping: Coi^{4}-san^{4}
- IPA: [tsʰɔj˩ sɐn˩]

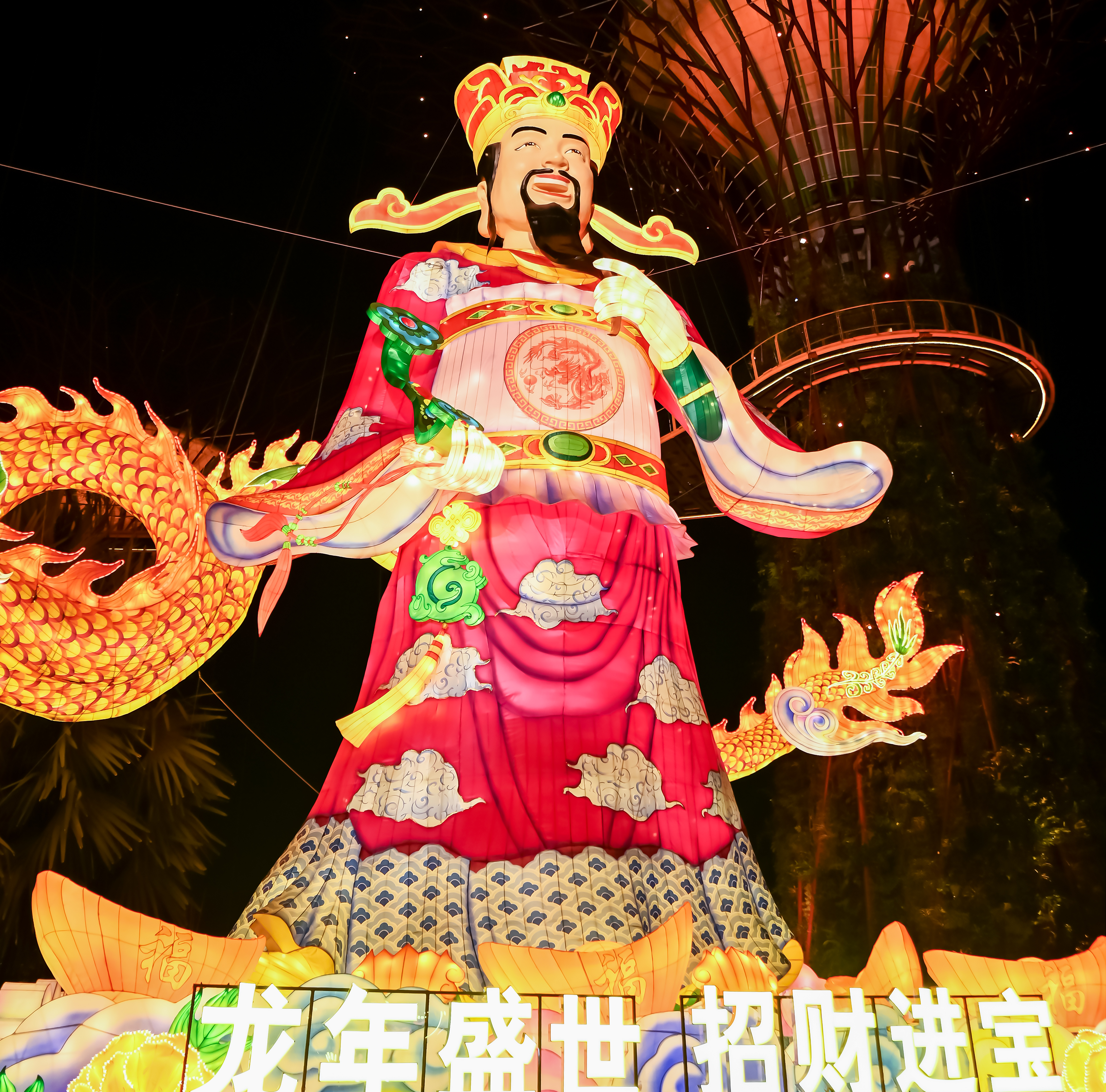
Caishen statue at Singapore's Gardens by the Bay to welcome Lunar New Year 2024.

Caishen (traditional Chinese: 財神; simplified Chinese: 财神; lit. 'God of Wealth') is a mythological figure worshipped in Chinese folk religion and Taoism. He has been identified with many historical figures, viewed as his embodied forms, among whom Zhao Gongming (趙公明, Wade–Giles: Chao Kung-ming; also known as Zhao Gong Yuanshuai 趙公元帥 "Lord Zhao the Marshal"), Fan Li, and Bi Gan.

Caishen's name is often invoked during Chinese New Year celebrations. He is often depicted riding a black tiger and holding a golden rod. He may also be depicted with an iron tool capable of turning stone and iron into gold.

== Historical personages ==
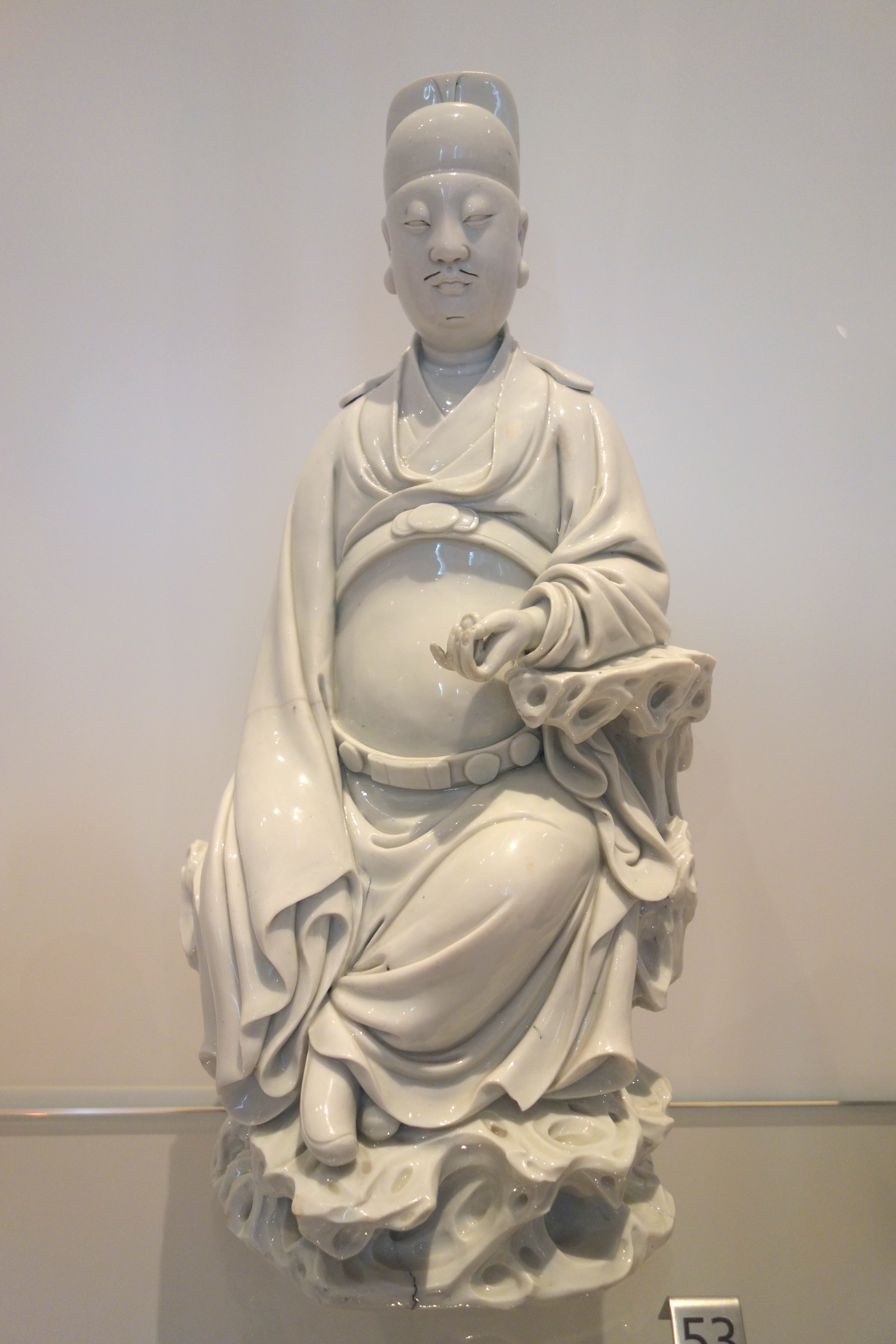
Dehua Caishen, c. 1600–1644, Royal Ontario Museum

Several versions concerning the political affiliations and modes of deification of Caishen's incarnations are in circulation. It is unclear whether they are genuine historical figures, though most of the stories agree that Caishen's most popular incarnation lived during the early Qin dynasty. Most probably the figure represents the merging of several heterogeneous legends, the one of Bi Gan being the most ancient.

According to legend, Bi Gan — the Shang dynasty prince and minister put to death by his nephew Di Xin — had a wife of the Chen clan and a son named Quan (泉). After Bi Gan's execution, his wife and son fled into the woods; Quan was later honoured by King Wu of Zhou as the founding ancestor of the Lin clan. Bi Gan's deification as a wealth god is one of the older strata of the Caishen tradition and is dramatised at length in the Ming dynasty novel The Investiture of the Gods.

A separate strand of the wealth-god tradition centres on Caibo Xingjun (財帛星君, "Star Lord of Wealth and Silk"), commonly identified with Li Guizu (李詭祖), a county magistrate from Zichuan District in Shandong province. Tradition holds that Li Guizu was honoured posthumously as a wealth deity during the early Tang dynasty in recognition of his administrative service to the district.

=== The Caishen of all directions ===
The "Five Roads Wealth Gods" (五路財神; wǔ lù cáishén) tradition, in which Zhao Gongming functions as central deity flanked by four assistants for the cardinal directions, derives principally from the Ming dynasty novel The Investiture of the Gods and from the religious compendium Sanjiao Soushen Daquan. In the vernacular religion of the Jiangnan region the "five roads" wealth god is historically connected to the cult of the Wutong, whose gradual transformation from a demonic into a benign wealth deity has been traced by the historian Richard von Glahn.

| No. | Direction | Name | Title |
|---|---|---|---|
| 1 | Center (中路財神) | Zhao Gong Ming (趙公明) | Military God of Wealth (武財神) |
| 2 | East (東路財神) | Xiao Sheng (蕭升) | God of Collecting Treasures (招寶天尊) |
| 3 | West (西路財神) | Cao Bao (曹寶) | God of Collecting Valuables (納珍天尊) |
| 4 | North (北路財神) | Yao Shao Si (姚少司) | God of Profitability (利市仙官) |
| 5 | South (南路財神) | Chen Jiu Gong (陳九公) | God of Attracting Wealth (招財使者) |
| 6 | South-East (東南路財神) | Han Xin Ye (韓信爺) | God of Gambling (大賭神) |
| 7 | South-West (西南路財神) | Liu Hai (劉海) | God of Luck (偏財神) |
| 8 | North-East (東北路財神) | Shen Wansan (沈萬三) | God of Gold (金財神) |
| 9 | North-West (西北路財神) | Tao Zhugong (陶朱公) | Civil God of Wealth (文財神) |

Caishen sometimes appears as a door god in Chinese and Taoist temples, usually in partnership with the Burning-Lamp Taoist.

== Civil and military wealth gods ==
Caishen incarnations are conventionally classified into two complementary categories. The civil wealth gods (文財神; wén cáishén) — chiefly Bi Gan and Fan Li (Tao Zhugong) — are depicted in court robes and associated with steady, ethical, and salaried wealth. The military wealth gods (武財神; wǔ cáishén) — chiefly Zhao Gongming and, in later tradition, Guan Yu — are depicted in armour and associated with commercial and entrepreneurial wealth.

== Contemporary worship ==
Caishen is among the most prominent deities greeted during Chinese New Year celebrations. In Chinese folk practice, families "welcome the God of Wealth" (接財神; jiē Cáishén) on the fifth day of the first lunar month, traditionally called pò wǔ (破五). Customary offerings include fish, fruit, and ingot-shaped dumplings (元寶湯; yuánbǎo tāng), and many businesses time their first day of trading after the New Year break to coincide with the welcoming day.

In Taiwanese folk religion, the related practice of borrowing qiánmǔ (錢母, "money mother") — small monetary tokens distributed at the lunar New Year and kept by devotees as "seed money" — is most strongly associated with Tudigong (Earth God) temples such as Zhushan Zinan Temple in Nantou County, but the practice has been adopted by many Caishen temples.

== Buddhism ==
Though Caishen is a Chinese folk deity, many Pure Land Buddhists venerate him as a buddha. In esoteric Buddhist schools he is identified as Jambhala.

== See also ==
- Wulu Caishen — the Five Roads Wealth Gods
- Sanxing (deities) — the Three Stars Fu, Lu, and Shou; Fuxing is sometimes conflated with Caishen
- Tudigong — the Earth God, also venerated for prosperity at the local level
- Guan Yu — venerated since the late imperial period as a wealth deity in commercial settings
- Liu Haichan — Taoist immortal associated with side-wealth (偏財神)
