= Lingzhi =

Lingzhi may refer to:

- Lingzhi mushroom (Ganoderma lingzhi), also called reishi, or several other similar mushrooms of the genus Ganoderma including:
  - Ganoderma lucidum
  - Ganoderma tsugae
- Lingzhi Gewog, a village block (gewog) of Thimphu District, Bhutan
- Lingzhi Yügyal Dzong, a monastery and fortress in Bhutan
- Lingzhi Township, in Jingning County, Gansu, China
- Lingzhi Subdistrict, in Yuecheng District, Shaoxing, Zhejiang, China
- Lingzhi station of the Shenzhen Metro, Shenzhen, Guangdong, China
- Forthing Lingzhi, minivans produced by Dongfeng Liuzhou Motor
