= Randeng =

Randeng may refer to:

- Randeng Daoren, Chinese Taoist deity
- Dipankara, Buddha, origin of Randeng Daoren
