= Bixiao Niangniang =

Character in 16th-century Chinese novel Fengshen Yanyi

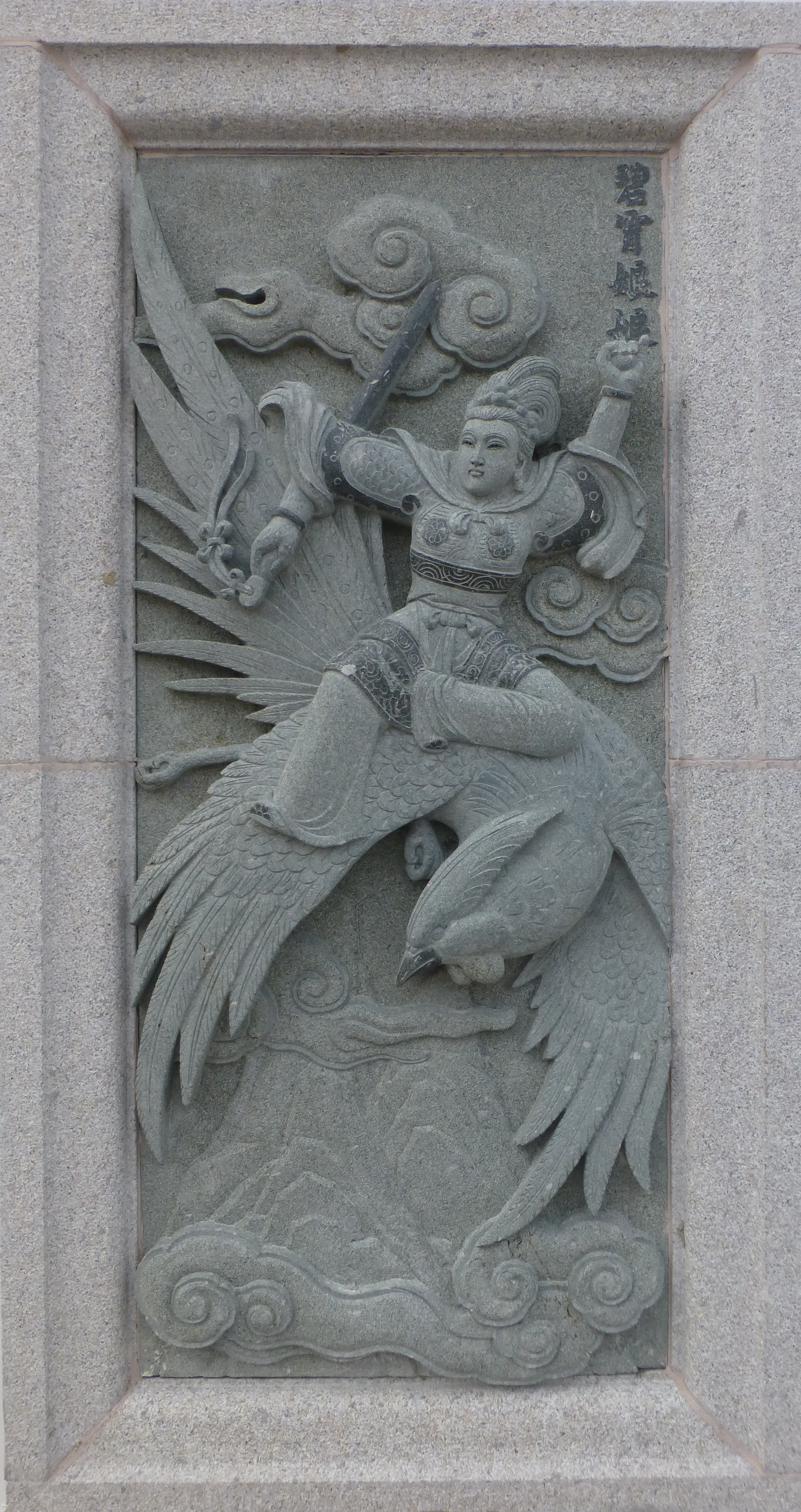
Bixiao Niangniang

Bixiao Niangniang (Chinese: 碧霄娘娘; lit. 'Lady of the Green Firmament'), also known as Zhao Bixiao or Bixiao Xianzi, is a character in the classic 16th-century Chinese novel Fengshen Yanyi. She is worshipped as a goddess of childbirth in Chinese folk religion. She is one of the Sanxiao Shengmu (Holy mothers of three skies, 三霄聖母) or Sanxiao Niangniang (Ladies of three stars, 三霄娘娘).

== In Fengshen Yanyi ==
According to Fengshen Yanyi, Bixiao is the youngest of the Three Celestial Maidens and one of the first-generation disciples of the Jie Sect under Tongtian Jiaozhu. She cultivates the Dao on Sanxian Island with her sisters, Yunxiao and Qiongxiao. Unlike the calm and composed Yunxiao, Bixiao is portrayed as outspoken, impulsive, and fearless. Her divine mount is a flower-feathered bird, and together the sisters possess the Golden Dragon Scissors (金蛟剪) and the Chaos-Origin Gold Gourd (混元金斗).

After Zhao Gongming was killed by Lu Ya Zhenren, Bixiao urged her sisters to seek revenge and joined Wen Zhong in battle against the Zhou forces. During the conflict, she helped establish the Grand Nine-Curves Yellow River Formation (九曲黄河阵). After the formation was broken, Bixiao attempted to attack Yuanshi Tianzun but was disarmed by Xianhe Tongzi (the White Crane Boy). Yuanshi Tianzun then sealed her inside a magical treasure chest, causing her body to dissolve into blood. Following the Zhou victory, Jiang Ziya collectively deified the three sisters as the "Ganying Suishi Xiangu" (感应随世仙姑).
