= Bagua Formation =

Bagua Formation may refer to:

- Baguazhen, Chinese military tactic.
- Chota Formation, the Early Campanian to Late Eocene geologic formation, formerly known as Bagua Formation
