= Song Jiang Battle Array =

Folk procession in Taiwan

Song Jiang Battle Array (Chinese: 宋江陣; Tâi-lô: Sòng-kang-tīn) is the biggest and the most commonly seen performing procession in southern Taiwan temple fairs. Literally speaking, Song Jiang Battle Array is a mimic of a character in the classical novel Water Margin, based on the tactical formations employed in the story such as baguazhen. The name of Song Jiang Battle Array came from "Song Jiang Play," which mainly consists of acrobatic fighting. Song Jiang Battle Array is now a folk culture that can only be seen in Taiwan and the most common folk parade formation in temple affairs.

== History ==
Song Jiang Battle Array originated from the Fujian region of China (Zhangzhou and Quanzhou area), and it was transformation of "Song Jiang Play," where Shaolin Quan masters imitated Song Jiang. It was introduced to Taiwan in the late Ming and early Qing dynasties. At the time, the soldiers who came to Taiwan with Zheng Cheng-gong were settling in the southern Taiwan. They would practice martial arts during break time, and array during religious event to guard the gods and ward off the evil spirits, which in turn united the villagers against aggression. Song Jiang Battle Array therefore spread from the southern region.

After the government of the Republic of China retreated to Taiwan and enforced the martial law, the development of Song Jiang Battle Array was restricted. It would often attach to temples and serve as the parade formation in front of figures of gods. The most famous Song Jiang Battle Array belongs to Neimen, Kaohsiung. The local Neimen Zizhu Temple and Nanhai Zizhu Temple spare no effort in passing on the ancient folk culture.

Although Song Jiang Battle Array originated from China, it has long been lost in China. Taiwan, on the other hand, has been able to keep numerous and complete types of arrays. The Song Jiang Battle Array troupe from Neimen, Kaohsiung is now training the troupe in Xiamen, hoping to revive Song Jiang Battle Array in China.

== Content of performance ==
The content of Song Jiang Battle Array consists of change of formation and martial arts performances. The order of the array and formation is roughly as follows: Kai Su Men (opening four gates), Tiao Chung Tsun, Lung Chuan Shui (water tornado), Wu Kung (Centipede) Array, Huang Feng Chieh Chao (bumble bees making hives), Huang Feng Chu Chao (bumble bees leaving hives), single & duo combat of pugilistic art and weaponry, and Bagua Array. Among the above arrays, Bagua Array is the most vital one. Apart from entertaining the spectators, it can also ward off the devils as well as protect the place and its residence. The types of martial arts are mainly Baihe Quan and Taizu Quan.
