= Baihe Tongzi =

Character in Fengshen Yanyi

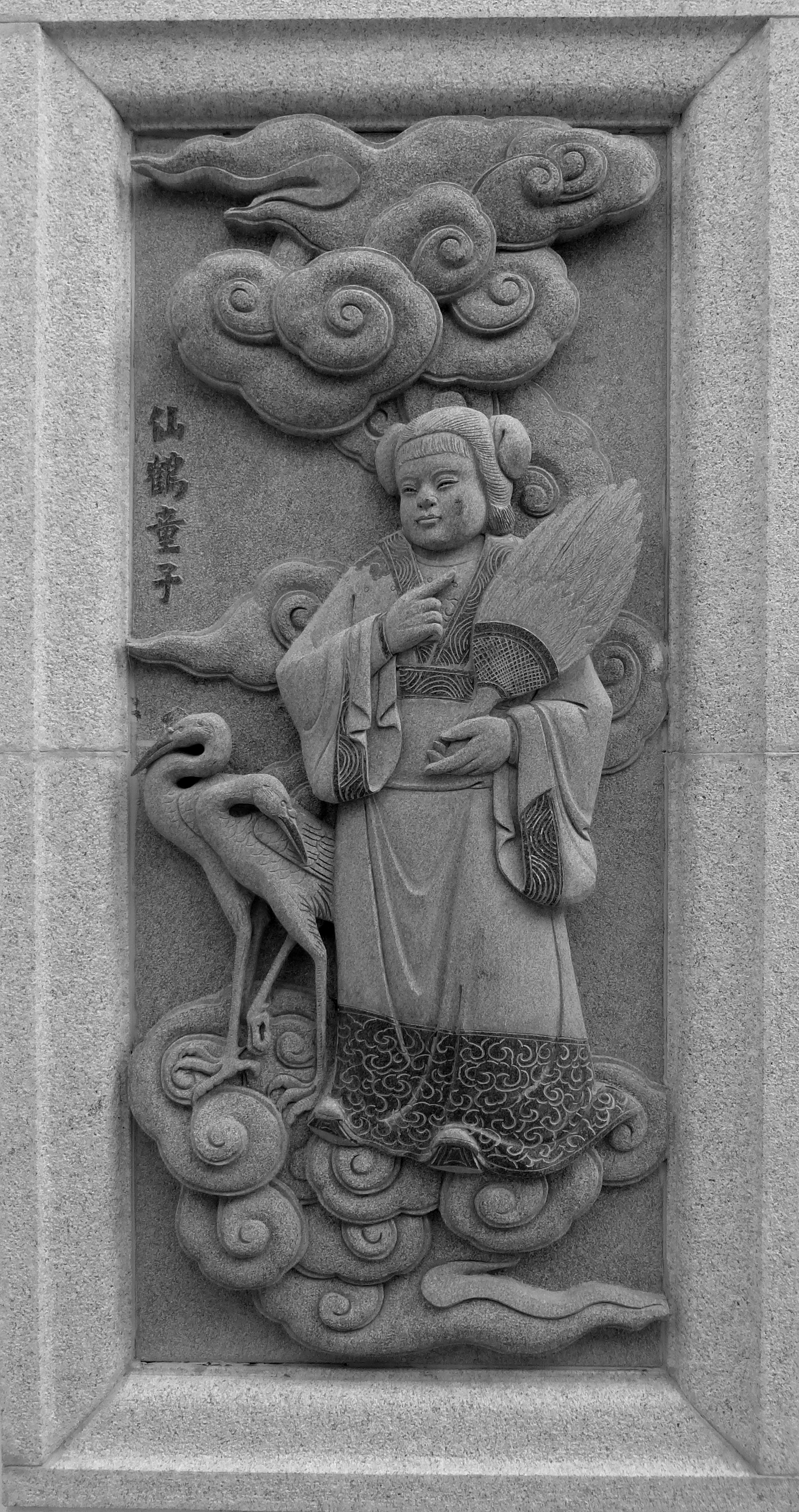
Xianhe Tongzi

Xianhe Tongzi, also known as Baihe Tongzi (simplified Chinese: 白鹤童子; traditional Chinese: 白鶴童子; pinyin: Báihè Tóngzǐ; lit. 'White Crane Boy'), is a character in the Chinese novel Investiture of the Gods (Fengshen Yanyi). He serves Yuanshi Tianzun as an attendant and messenger of the Chanjiao. His true form is a white crane.

== In Fengshen Yanyi ==
Baihe Tongzi first appears when he visits Taiyi Zhenren at Golden Light Cave on Mount Qianyuan. He brings a message from Yuanshi Tianzun, telling Taiyi Zhenren to send Lingzhuzi (靈珠子) into the human world before Jiang Ziya leaves Mount Kunlun. Lingzhuzi is later born as Nezha.

He later summons Jiang Ziya from the Peach Garden on the orders of Yuanshi Tianzun. He calls Jiang Ziya his martial uncle (師叔). Yuanshi Tianzun then tells Jiang Ziya to leave Mount Kunlun and help the Zhou overthrow the Shang dynasty.

When Shen Gongbao tries to persuade Jiang Ziya to abandon his mission, he cuts off his own head and sends it flying through the air to show his magical powers. Nanji Xianweng orders Baihe Tongzi to turn into a white crane and carry the head towards the South Sea. Without his head, Shen Gongbao faces death. Jiang Ziya asks Nanji Xianweng to spare him, and Baihe Tongzi returns the head. He accidentally drops it facing backwards, forcing Shen Gongbao to turn it around.

Baihe Tongzi also fights alongside the Chanjiao immortals. During their battle against the three sisters of the Three Immortals Island, he strikes Qiongxiao with the Three-Treasure Jade Ruyi (三寶玉如意) on Yuanshi Tianzun's orders. He later accompanies Nanji Xianweng into the Red Sand Formation. When Zhang Shao tries to escape, Baihe Tongzi strikes him in the back with the Jade Ruyi and kills him with a sword.

After the Ten Thousand Immortals Formation is destroyed, Baihe Tongzi spots Shen Gongbao trying to escape on his tiger. He reports this to Yuanshi Tianzun, who orders the Yellow-Turban Strongman to capture Shen Gongbao. Baihe Tongzi hands over the Three-Treasure Jade Ruyi, which the strongman uses to capture him. Shen Gongbao is then taken to Kirin Cliff and sent to seal the Eye of the North Sea.

Near the end of the novel, Jiang Ziya returns to Mount Kunlun to ask Yuanshi Tianzun for permission to appoint the dead heroes and immortals as gods. Baihe Tongzi receives him and reports his arrival. He later brings Yuanshi Tianzun's written decree to Jiang Ziya, accompanied by Yellow-Turban Strongmen. Jiang Ziya uses the decree to complete the investiture of the gods.

== Folklore ==
In Taiwanese folk religion, Baihe Tongzi serves Nanji Xianweng, the god of longevity. He guards Mount Kunlun and its sacred lingzhi herb.

In a story from the Legend of the White Snake, Bai Suzhen goes to Mount Kunlun to obtain lingzhi to save Xu Xian. Baihe Tongzi stops her as she leaves with the herb. Nanji Xianweng arrives and asks why she took it. After hearing her story, he allows her to take the lingzhi. Xu Xian is then brought back to life.

In Leifengta Qizhuan (雷峰塔奇傳), Baihe Tongzi attacks Bai Suzhen after she receives the herb from Nanji Xianweng. His cry causes her to fall from the sky and die. He is about to peck her body when White Oriole Boy (白鶯童子), sent by Guanyin, stops him. White Oriole Boy then brings Bai Suzhen back to life and sends her home with the herb.

In Leifeng Baojuan (雷峰寶卷), Baihe Tongzi also pursues Bai Suzhen after she takes the herb. He returns to his crane form and tries to eat her. Nanji Xianweng arrives and orders him to stop. He then revives Bai Suzhen and lets her return to Xu Xian.

== Worship and religious art ==
Baihe Tongzi is worshipped in Taiwanese folk religion as an attendant of Nanji Xianweng, the god of longevity. He is also called Baihe Xiantong (白鶴仙童). At Hongde Temple (宏德宮) in Yingge District, New Taipei City, he is enshrined on the left side of the rear hall, alongside Wangchan Laozu. The temple's main deity is Sun Bin.

Baihe Xiantong is the main deity of Kunlun Baihe Xian Gong (崑崙白鶴仙宮) in Taichung. In September 2026, one of the temple's statues was temporarily placed at Shoutian Temple in Nantou County while a new temple building was being built. The new building was expected to be completed in 2027.

In Qigu District, Tainan, Baihe Tongzi and Baihe Xianshi (白鶴仙師) are the guardian deities of the Baihe Zhen (白鶴陣), a traditional religious and martial procession held by Shuzijiao Bao'an Temple (樹仔腳寶安宮). The troupe was founded in 1928. Its performances include a white crane dance and martial arts based on the Song Jiang Battle Array. One performer dresses as a crane, while another plays Baihe Tongzi and leads the dance. The Baihe Zhen was registered as a traditional performing art in 2007.

Wooden statues of Baihe Tongzi are held by Taiwan Historica. One shows him seated on a lotus base, wearing a Daoist robe and holding a white whisk. Another shows him seated on a crane. The Institute of Ethnology, Academia Sinica, also holds a wooden statue of Baihe Tongzi, collected in 2014 from Longtian Daotang (龍天道堂) in Sanchong District, New Taipei City.
