= Stone Sentinel Maze =

Array of rocks and boulders in Chinese folklore

- Traditional Chinese: 八陣圖
- Simplified Chinese: 八阵图
Transcriptions
Standard Mandarin
- Hanyu Pinyin: Bā Zhèn Tú

Alternative Chinese name
- Traditional Chinese: 石兵八陣
- Simplified Chinese: 石兵八阵
Transcriptions
Standard Mandarin
- Hanyu Pinyin: Shí Bīng Bā Zhèn

The Stone Sentinel Maze was an array of rocks and boulders thought to be conjured by Zhuge Liang based on the baguazhen and the concept of the bagua. The formation was located on Yufu Shore (魚腹浦) by the Yangtze River near present-day Baidicheng, Chongqing, China, where supposed ruins of the array exist. In folklore, when the Yangtze River rises in summer, the formation is submerged, but in autumn, the array resurfaces, with the rocks and boulders still left intact in their original positions.

== Lu Xun's encounter ==
The Stone Sentinel Maze was mentioned in Chapter 84 of the historical novel Romance of the Three Kingdoms by Luo Guanzhong.

Liu Bei was defeated by Lu Xun at the Battle of Xiaoting and fled towards Baidicheng with Lu Xun in hot pursuit. When Lu Xun arrived at Yufu Shore by the Yangtze River near Baidicheng, he felt a strong enemy presence and cautioned his troops of a possible ambush. He sent men to scout ahead, who reported that the area was deserted except for some scattered piles of rocks. Bewildered, Lu Xun asked a local, who told him that qi started emerging from the area after Zhuge Liang arranged the rocks there when he first entered Sichuan.

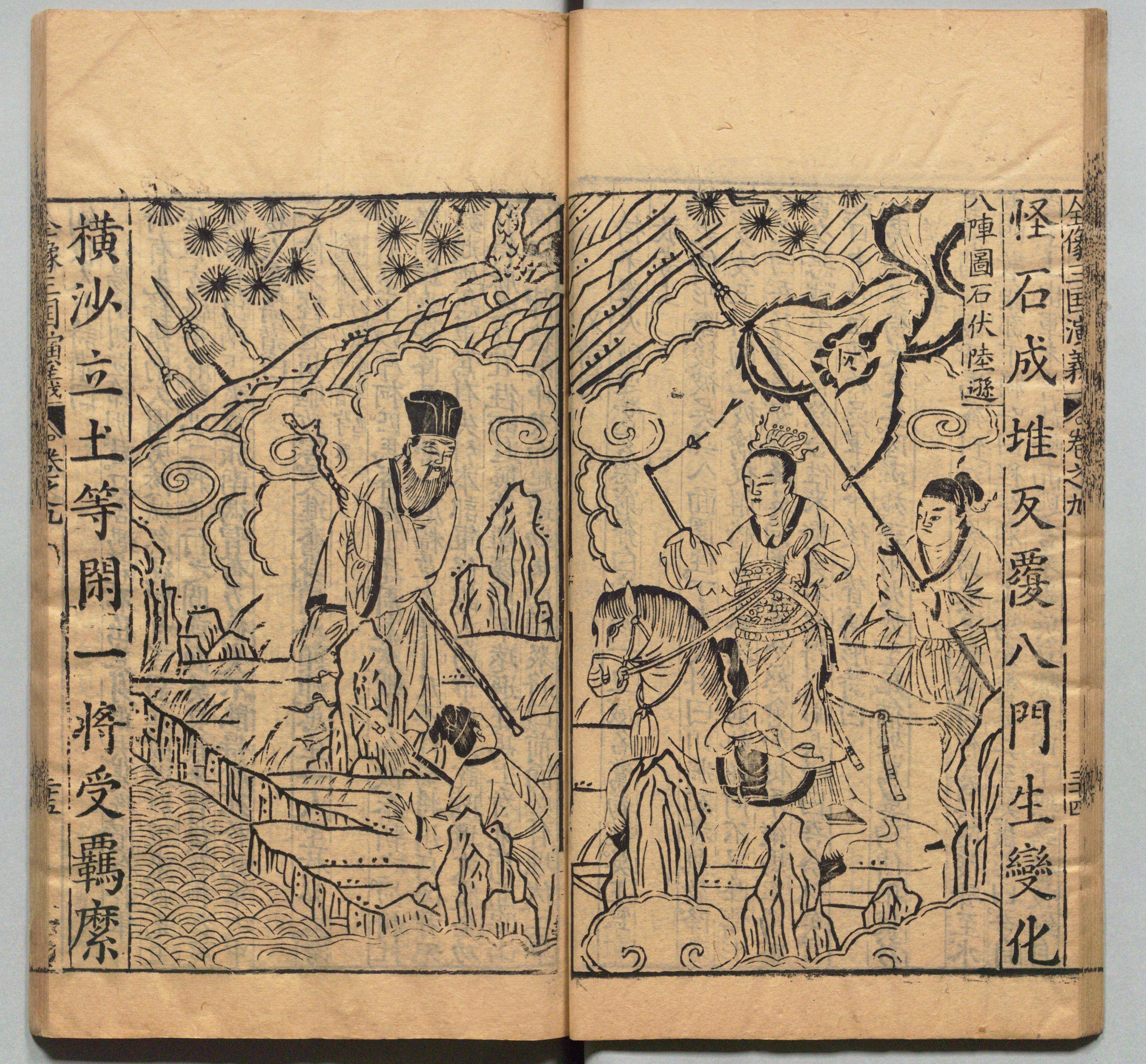
Illustration from a 1591 edition of Romance of the Three Kingdoms depicting Lu Xun (on horseback) caught in the Zhuge Liang's Stone Sentinel Maze. The river waves are indicated on the lower left.

Lu Xun personally inspected the area and believed that the "maze" was only a petty display of deception, so he led a few men inside. Just as he was about to leave, a strong gust of wind blew. Dust storms overshadowed the sky and the rocks seemed like swords, mountainous piles of dirt emerged while the river waves sounded like an attacking army. Lu Xun exclaimed, "I have fallen into Zhuge Liang's trap!", and attempted to escape from the maze but to no avail.

Suddenly, Lu Xun saw an old man, who offered him assistance in exiting the labyrinth. Lu Xun followed him and got out of the maze unharmed. The old man identified himself as Huang Chengyan, Zhuge Liang's father-in-law. He explained to Lu Xun that the maze was constructed based on the ba gua concept. Huang Chengyan also told Lu Xun that Zhuge Liang had predicted that a Wu general would chance upon the maze when he first built it, and had asked him not to lead the general out when he fell into the trap. Lu Xun dismounted and thanked Huang Chengyan. When he returned to camp, he exclaimed that he was inferior to Zhuge Liang in terms of intelligence. He then made plans to return to Eastern Wu because he feared that their rival state Cao Wei might take advantage of the situation to attack Wu.

=== Historicity ===
No documentation of this event is found in Records of the Three Kingdoms, the authoritative historical text for the history of the Three Kingdoms period. It was mentioned in Lu Xun's biography that after Liu Bei retreated to Baidicheng, the Wu generals Xu Sheng, Pan Zhang, Song Qian and others felt that Liu Bei was within reach and they could capture him, so they kept making requests to Sun Quan to allow them to attack Baidicheng. Sun Quan asked Lu Xun for his opinion, and Lu Xun, along with Zhu Ran and Luo Tong, gave their response, "Cao Pi has thousands of troops. He pretends to agree to help us attack (Liu) Bei, but he has other motives. Please make the decision to return (to Wu) soon." Not long after, as Lu Xun expected, Cao Wei forces came to attack Eastern Wu from three directions, which would trigger a series of battles between Wei and Wu between 222 and 225.

== Zhang Xianzhong's encounter ==
During the late Ming Dynasty, the rebel leader Zhang Xianzhong stumbled across the maze while he was fleeing from the imperial army in Chengdu. Through the guidance of an old man, Zhang Xianzhong led his troops into the maze and out. The pursuing imperial forces charged into the array. Suddenly, mist shrouded the area and the piles of dirt appeared to be hills and valleys. The imperial soldiers exhausted themselves over the night by attempting to escape but only at daybreak did they realize that they were actually charging at piles of dirt.

== Cultural references ==
- The maze had been a subject for many ancient Chinese poets, such as Du Fu and Lu Yu.
- The maze and site are the setting for The Small Stones of Tu Fu, a short story by Brian Aldiss published in 1978.
- In the classic occult novel Teito Monogatari by Hiroshi Aramata, the representation of Kimon Tonkou magic is based on the stone sentinel maze.
- The maze is featured in many video games based on the Three Kingdoms era. For example, it is an inseparable element in the Battle of Yi Ling in Koei's Dynasty Warriors series.
- The Portal Three Kingdoms expansion set of the Magic:The Gathering collectible card game includes a card named "Eightfold Maze".
- In the popular mobile game Fate/Grand Order, the Eightfold Maze is referenced with Zhuge Liang's Noble Phantasm, ¨Unreturning Army • Stone Sentinel Maze¨.
- The maze is referenced in anime Ya Boy Kongming!.

== See also ==
- Baguazhen
