= Lingzhi Township =

Lingzhi Township 灵芝乡
- Township
- Location in Gansu
- Coordinates: 35°36′40″N 105°40′20″E
- Country: People's Republic of China
- Province: Gansu
- Prefecture-level city: Pingliang
- County: Jingning County
- Village-level divisions: 11 villages
- Time zone: UTC+8 (China Standard)

Lingzhi Township (simplified Chinese: 灵芝乡; traditional Chinese: 靈芝鄉; pinyin: Língzhī Xiāng) is a township of Jingning County, Gansu province, China. As of 2023, it has eleven villages under its administration:

- Gaoyi Village (高义村)
- Cheli Village (车李村)
- Yincha Village (尹岔村)
- Zhangpu Village (张堡村)
- Shuiliu Village (水流村)
- Dongzhuang Village (东庄村)
- Yangcha Village (杨岔村)
- Yangqu Village (杨渠村)
- Qianwan Village (前湾村)
- Changyuan Village (长塬村)
- Junfeng Village (俊峰村)

== See also ==
- List of township-level divisions of Gansu
