= Lingzhi Subdistrict =

Lingzhi Subdistrict 灵芝街道
- Subdistrict
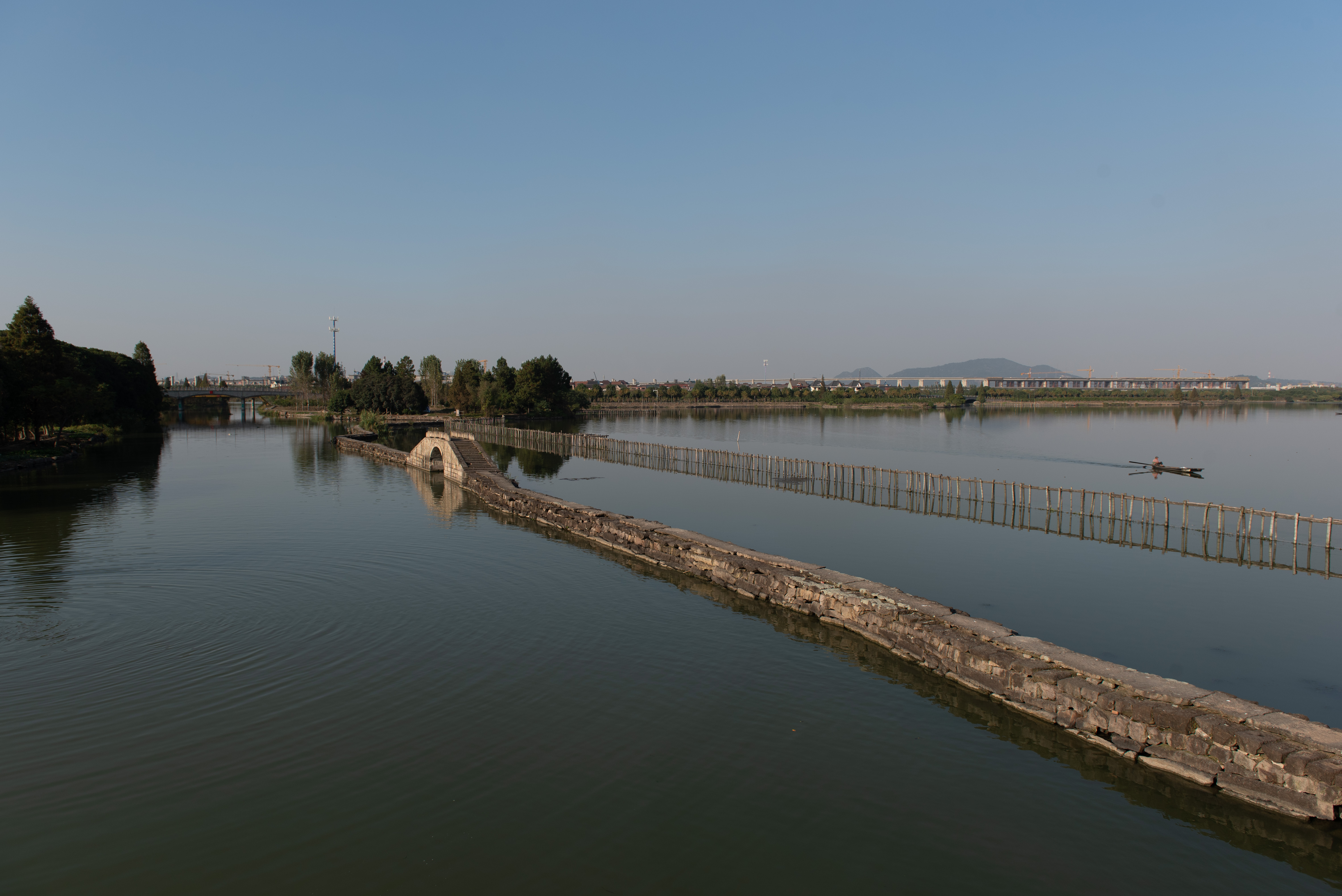
- Angsang Lake

- Location in Zhejiang
- Coordinates: 30°1′43″N 120°34′25″E
- Country: People's Republic of China
- Province: Zhejiang
- Prefecture-level city: Shaoxing
- District: Yuecheng District
- Time zone: UTC+8 (China Standard)

Lingzhi Subdistrict (simplified Chinese: 灵芝街道; traditional Chinese: 靈芝街道; pinyin: Língzhī Jiēdào) is a subdistrict in Yuecheng District, Shaoxing, Zhejiang, China. As of 2023, it administers 24 residential communities and 22 villages.

== Communities ==
- Lingzhi Community
- Runqinhuayuan Community (润沁花园社区)
- Dashujiang Community (大树江社区)
- Tianhe Community (天和社区)
- Waitan Community (外滩社区)
- Datan Community (大滩社区)
- Jiaoli Community (蛟里社区)
- Yongtai Community (永泰社区)
- Luojiang Community (洛江社区)
- Nüdi Community (女迪社区)
- Chenggang Community (澄港社区)
- Quanxin Community (全心社区)
- Anxin Community (安心社区)
- Xiaogang Community (肖港社区)
- Qutun Community (曲屯社区)
- Daqingsi Community (大庆寺社区)
- Yangjianong Community (阳嘉弄社区)
- Fenglin Community (凤林社区)
- Linjiang Community (临江社区)
- Sihuijiang Community (泗汇江社区)
- Meishanjiang Community (梅山江社区)
- Meishan Community (梅山社区)
- Guandu Community (官渡社区)
- Yangjiang Community (洋江社区)

== Villages ==
- Zhangshi Village (张市村)
- Dashan Village (大善村)
- Xiaoshan Village (小善村)
- Xibengtan Village (西蚌潭村)
- Baiyutan Village (白鱼潭村)
- Shuichan Village (水产村)
- Mozhuang Village (墨庄村)
- Meidong Village (梅东村)
- Xishantou Village (西山头村)
- Shanquan Village (山泉村)
- Luzhuang Village (潞庄村)
- Luyang Village (潞阳村)
- Qianwang Village (前王村)
- Wufeng Village (五峰村)
- Lintou Village (林头村)
- Jiahui Village (嘉会村)
- Lidai Village (立岱村)
- Qingyun Village (青云村)
- Zhuangtou Village (庄头村)
- Qilijiang Village (七里江村)
- Houzhu Village (后诸村)
- Angsanghu Village (㹧𱮒湖村)

== See also ==
- List of township-level divisions of Zhejiang
