= Baguazhen =

Chinese military formation

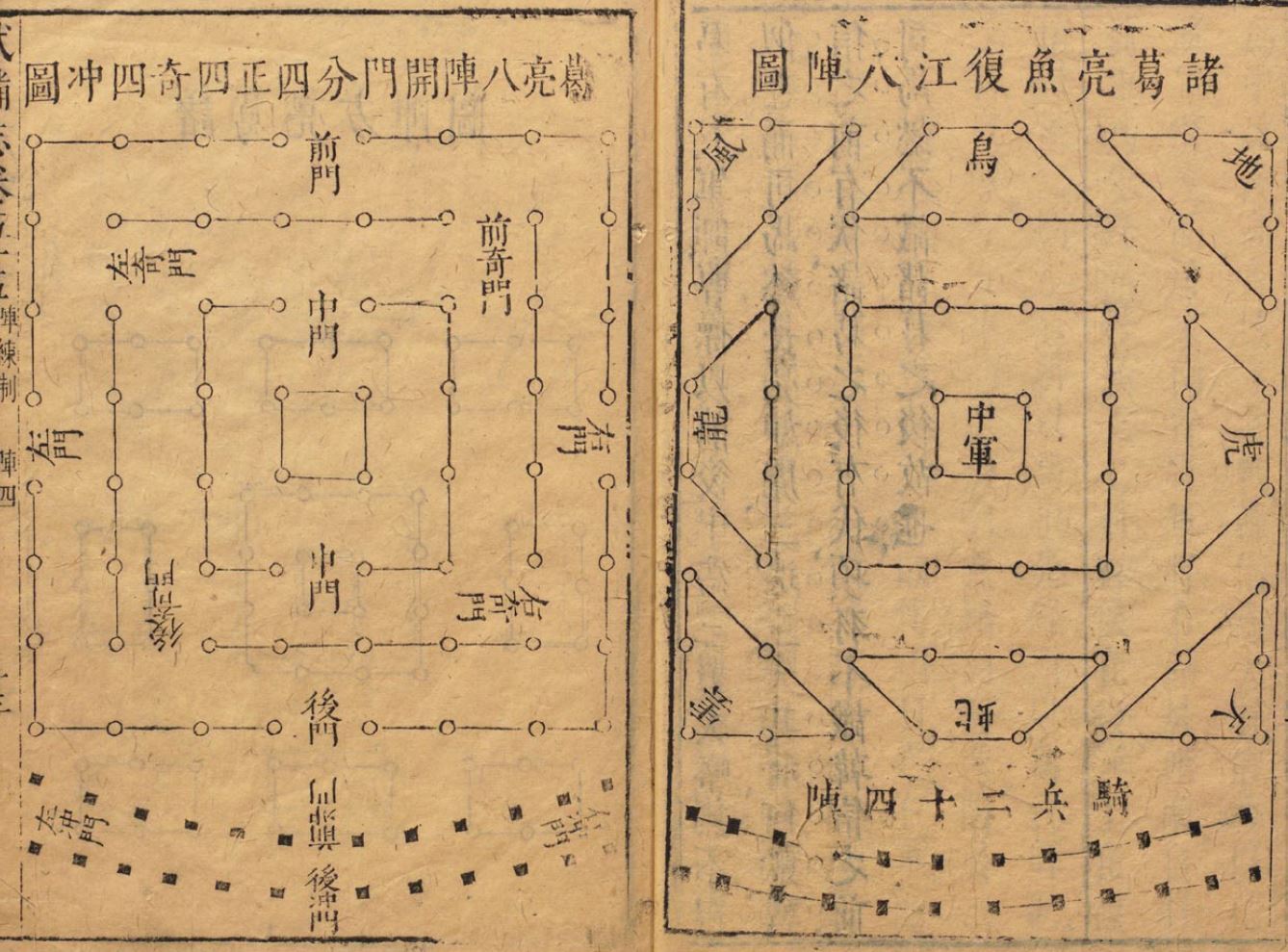
- Wubei Zhi's diagrams of baguazhen
- Traditional Chinese: 八卦陣
- Simplified Chinese: 八卦阵
Transcriptions
Standard Mandarin
- Hanyu Pinyin: Bā Guà Zhèn

Baguazhen (Chinese: 八卦陣; pinyin: bāguàzhèn; lit. 'eight trigrams (military) formation') or Bagua Formation, also known as Jiujun (lit. 'Nine armies') or Jiǔgōng bāguàzhèn (九宮八卦陣; 'Nine palaces', 'eight trigrams formation') or Bazhen (八陣; 'eight formations') is a military formation originating from China, based on the principles of Bagua or Qimen Dunjia. The formation has been used throughout Chinese history and attributed to many famous military figures, most notably to Zhuge Liang. In Song dynasty sources, the bazhen is also alternatively known as jiujunzhen (九軍陣; 'nine-army formation').

== Overview ==
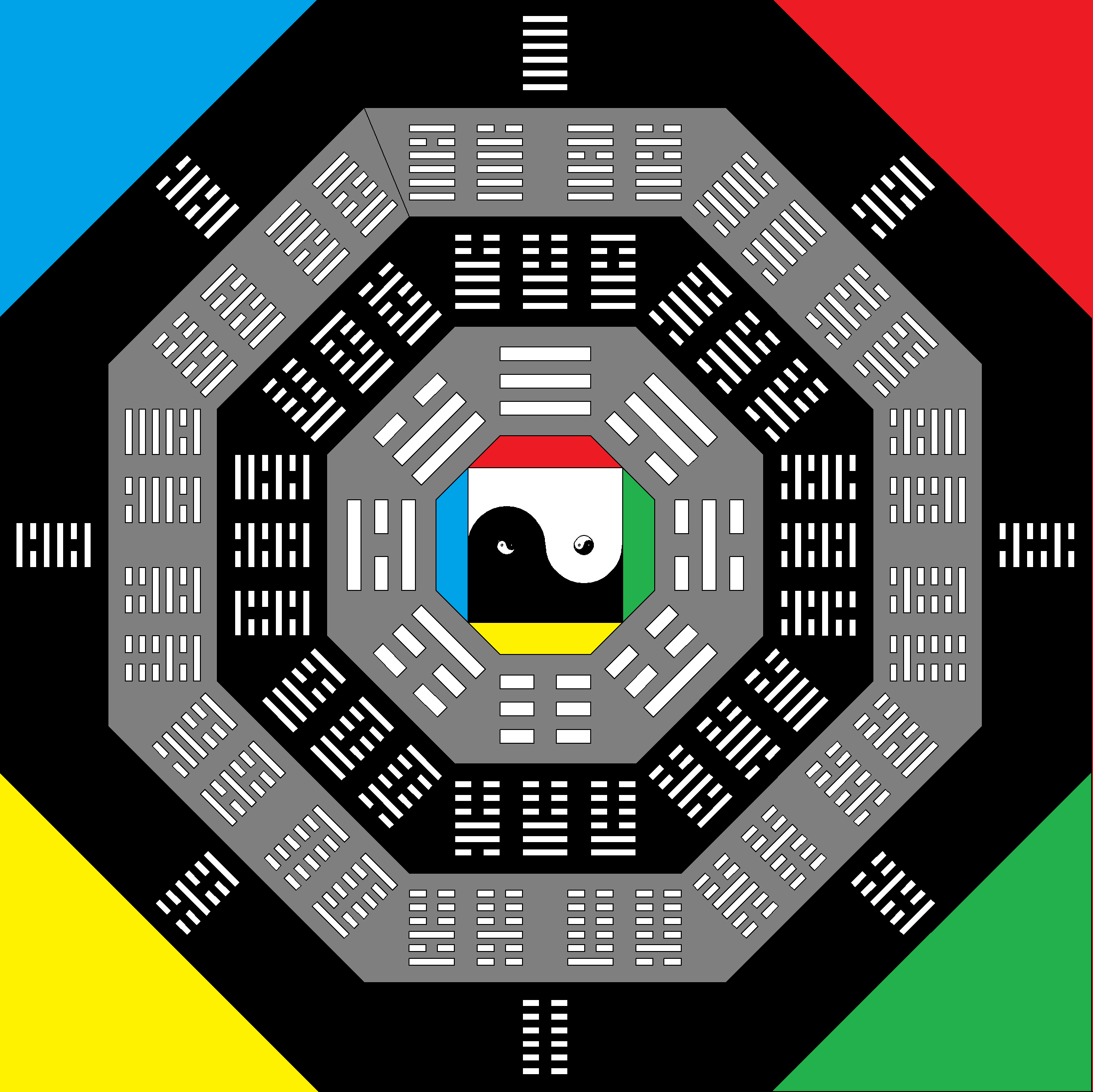
Diagram of Bagua; each sides are split into group of trigrams.

Generally, the bazhen is a mass military formation, where the army are divided into eight units deployed at cardinal and ordinal directions, often surrounding a central commanding unit. The exact composition and the names of the regiments in the baguazhen varies in different sources, but the key feature of the formation is its defensive capability and adaptability, by quickly mobilizing and shifting unit ranks on the field, to cover for each unit's weaknesses.

=== Unit composition ===
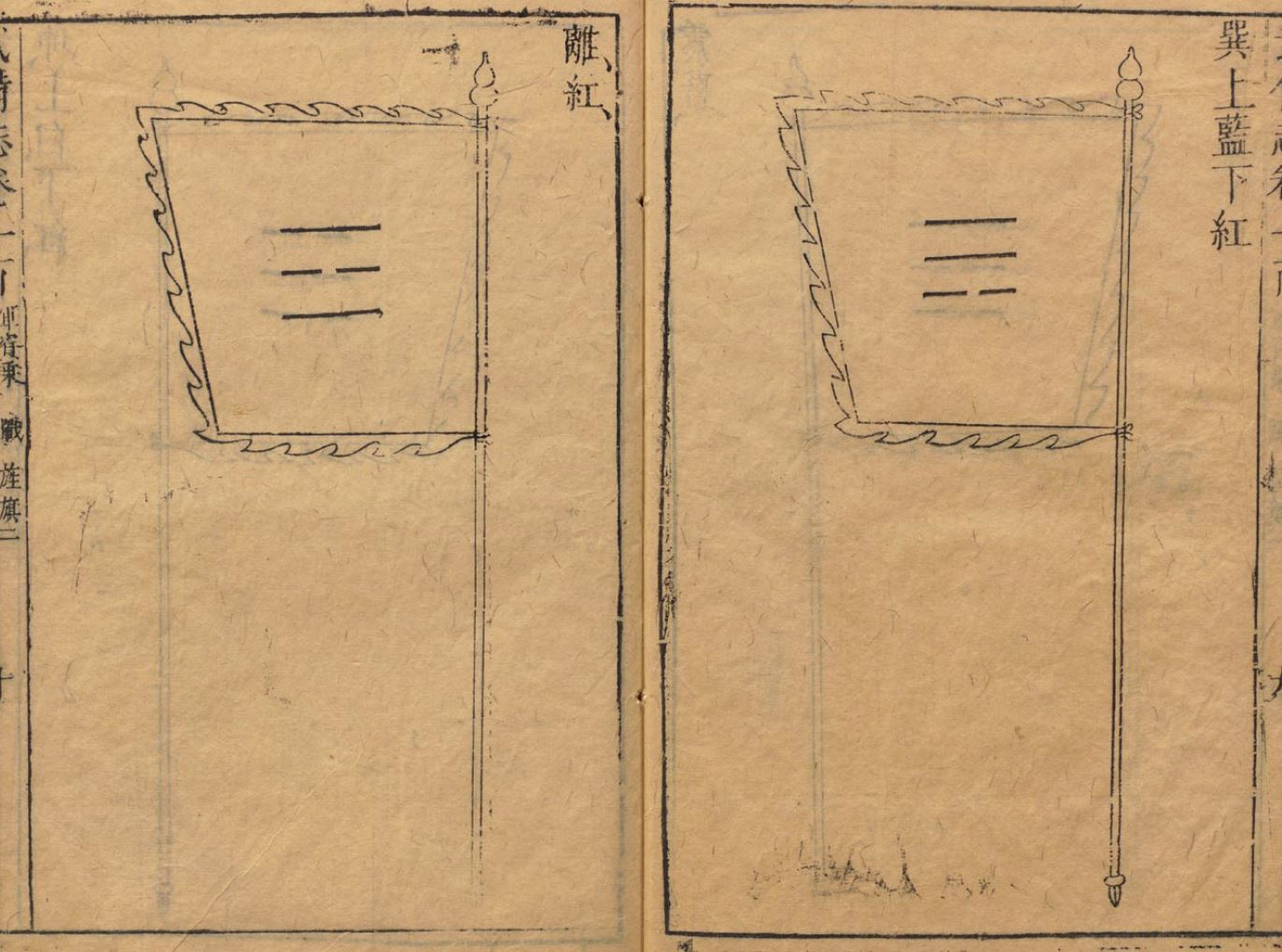
Trigrams are often used on military banners, from Wubei Zhi.

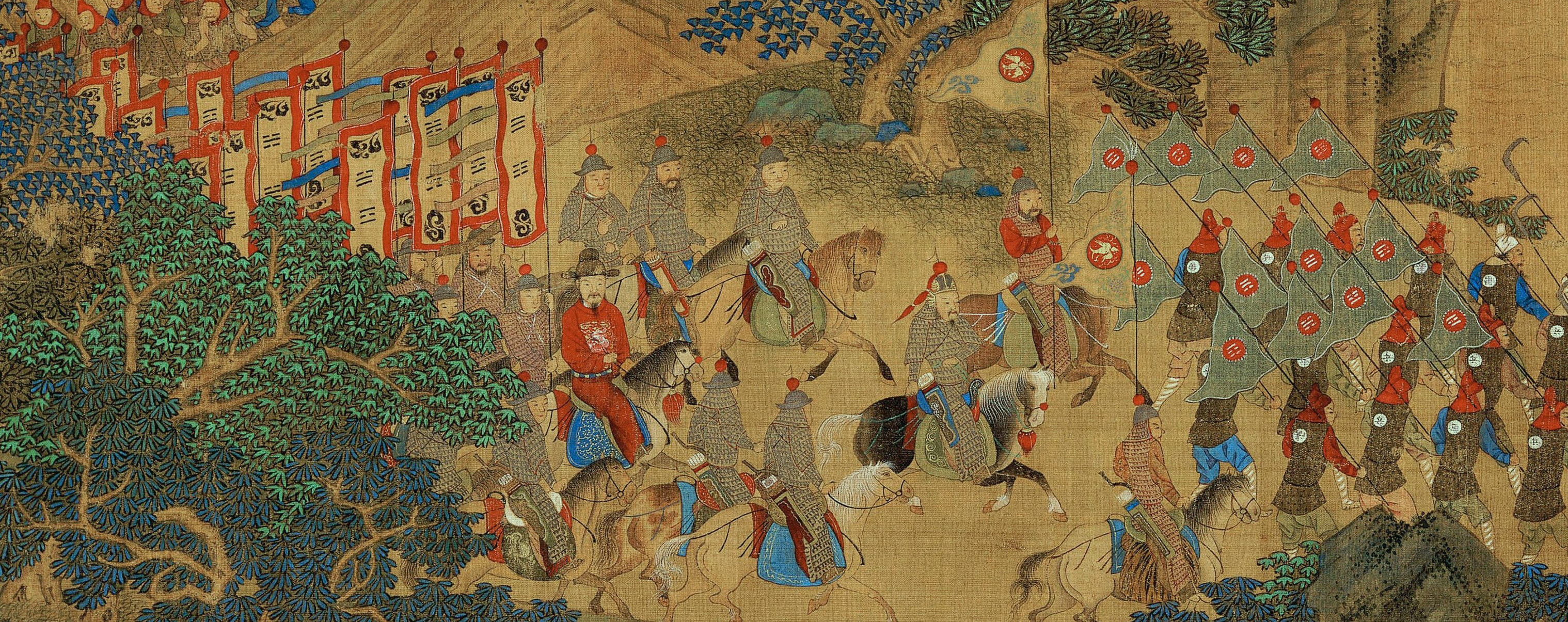
Example of trigram symbols used on cavalry and infantry banners, from the Ming dynasty painting Wokou tujuan (倭寇圖卷).

In Questions and Replies between Tang Taizong and Li Weigong, the formation is described as being composed of large, medium and small units, with each unit being composed of, and able to divide into, smaller battalions. Roughly, the large unit is composed of eight medium units, and the medium units can be split into six small squad units, making a total of 64 squad units per formation. Some sources also call for an additional shock cavalry numbering in 24 squads, bringing the number to a total of 88. The central unit would be composed of small number of elite troops, protected by large number of movable infantry. Each unit situated in each direction could respond to any attack and function as each others' defence and reserve, by shifting their positions and surrounding the attacker from all sides, or moving its weaker units behind the stronger units. Other sources such as Taiping Yulan also records the use of war wagons, such as the "deer-antler wagon" (鹿角車), to obstruct the enemy while providing added protection and quick transport for the soldiers.

The regiments are also separated into zheng (正)-troops or regular troops, and qi (奇)-troops, or special troops, respectively. The zheng and qi are based on Sun Tzu's tactic of applying direct, ordinary force to engage in battle and for indirect, inordinary force to secure victory. ("凡戰者，以正合，以奇勝").

=== Naming convention ===
The names of the eight units vary. In the dialog between Li Jing and Li Shimin, it is said that the regiments are named Tian (天, 'heaven'), Di (地, 'earth'), Feng (風, 'wind'), Yun (雲, 'cloud'), Long (龍, 'dragon'), Hu (虎, 'tiger'), Niao (鳥, 'bird') and She (蛇, 'snake'), with heaven, earth, wind and cloud symbolising flags and banners, and dragon, tiger, bird and snake corresponded to squad units. These units are further categorized into four zheng-units and four qi-units, respectively.

In Wujing Zongyao, the eight formations are the 'sky-formation' (天陣), 'earth-formation' (地陣), 'wind-formation' (風陣), 'cloud-formation' (雲陣), 'tiger wing-formation' (虎翼陣), 'snake coil-formation' (蛇盤陣), 'flying dragon-formation'(飛龍陣), and 'bird soaring-formation' (鳥翔陣), with each having their assigned position within the formation, with the animal formations supporting the elemental formations, while lesser elemental forms support the greater.

Wang Yingling of the Song dynasty records in the book Xiaoxue Ganzhu (小学绀珠) that the names of the eight formations are Dongdang (洞當), Zhonghuang (中黃), Longteng (龍騰), Niaofei (鳥飛), Zhechong (折衝), Huyi (虎翼), Woji (握機), and Lianheng (連衡).

Other sources claim the eight are named after the eight gates of Qimen Dunjia, called Xiu (休), Sheng (生), Shang (伤), Du (杜), Jing (景), Si (死), Jing (惊), and Kai (开).

== History ==
The earliest mention of the military formation was from Sun Bin's Art of War during the Warring States period. The formation is organised through "dividing the army detachment into three units, each placing an elite vanguard and a rear-guard as reserve. Each unit would engage against the enemy in battle, while leaving the other two in reserve and to consolidate the gains." The position of the units would shift based on the strength of the enemy; if the enemy is weak, the elite troops will be sent to mount a shock attack to gain an advantage, if the enemy is strong, the weakest troops will be sent first to bait them. Sun Bin also advices using terrain as advantage before placing the formation. "When land is flat, there should be more armed chariots; when the terrain is difficult, more cavalry should be sent: and when narrow and blocked, there should be more archers sent."

By the time of the Eastern Han dynasty, the baguazhen became regularly used in warfare and military drills. General Dou Xian notably defeated the Xiongnu using the bazhen formation.

The baguazhen saw notable innovation during the Three Kingdoms period by Zhuge Liang, who made improvements on the formation for use of military drills and as defensive tactic against Cao Wei's cavalry. Zhuge Liang's tactics overall favored smaller elite units and careful, deliberate engagements, so the formation proved to be effective in combating against the stronger and more numerous armies of Cao Wei, while keeping Shu Han's losses to a minimum. Zhuge Liang made additional improvements to the bazhen through the addition of a command structure centered within the formation and extensive use of crossbows supplemented by a defensive spear-infantry and war wagons against Cao Wei's heavy cavalry to deadly effect. The bazhen enabled Zhuge Liang's army to be disciplined and flexible, quick to adapt to multiple terrains and situations, but was slow and plodding when it came to consolidating their conquests and retreating.

Despite these flaws, later military officers emulated Zhuge Liang's successes by studying the baguazhen, which became attributed to Zhuge Liang alone. Examples of this include Ma Long during his conquest of Liangzhou in 279, where he utilized the formation and building protective wagons to guard against arrows and other ambushes, while his soldiers were able to move while fighting, and the enemies' arrows were unable to hit them. Gao Lü of Northern Wei studied and advocated the use of Zhuge Liang's bazhen to defend against invasions from nomadic tribes.

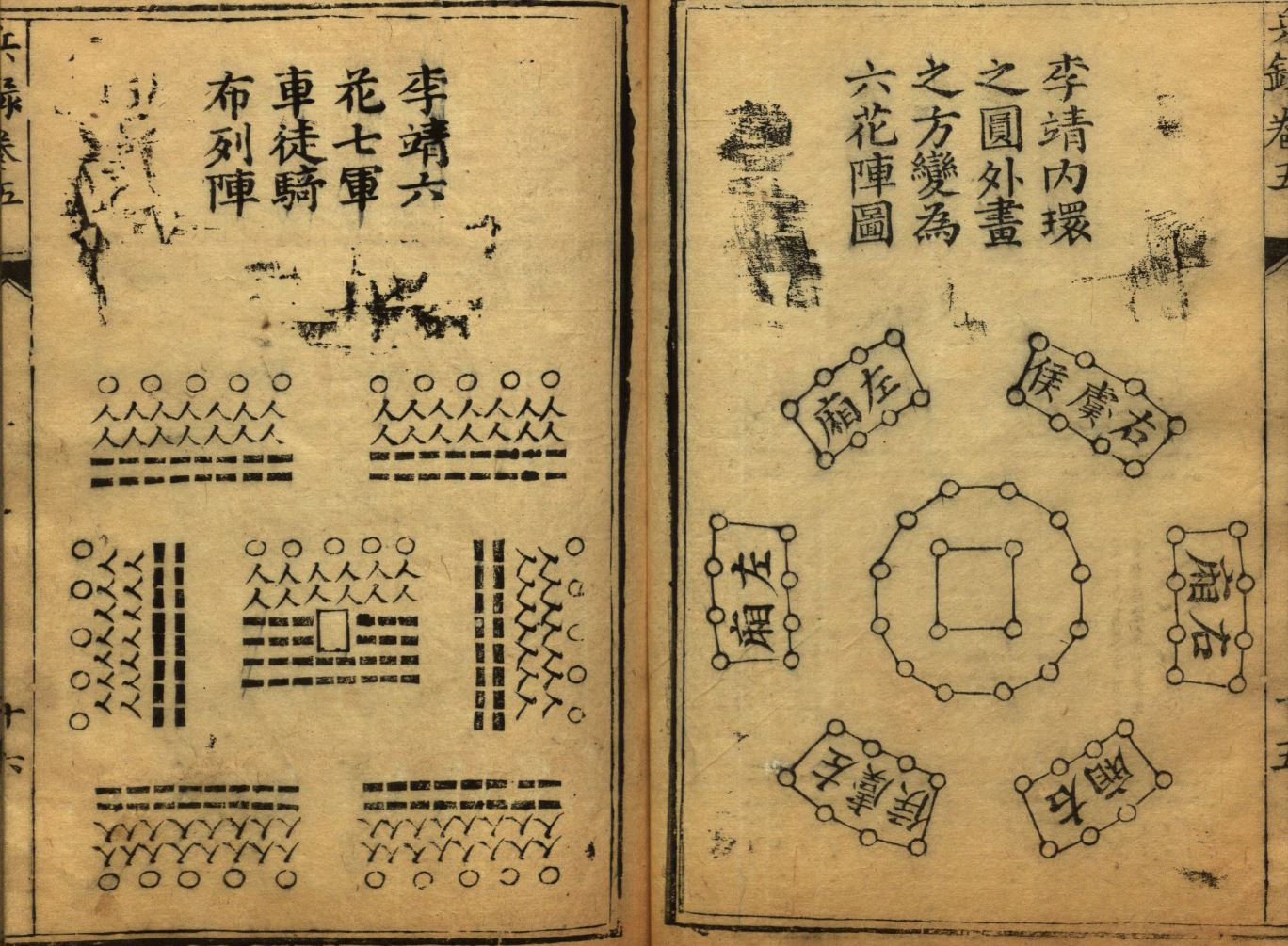
Ming dynasty diagram of Li Jing's "Six flower formation".

In Questions and Replies between Tang Taizong and Li Weigong, the baguazhen was discussed in great detail. Following on the principles of bazhen, Li Jing developed a new military formation named "Liuhuazhen" (Chinese: 六花陣; lit. 'six-flower formation' ), which similarly divided the armies into battalions arranged around a central unit, with stronger units protecting the weaker ones and able to shift positions quickly.

The later Song dynasty continued to use the bazhen as part of its military strategy, partially based on Li Jing's tactical formations, to better combat the superior cavalry of various northern peoples such as the Liao or Jurchen-Jin. In Wujing Zongyao, detailed instructions and variations were provided for the formation. Emperor Taizong of Song utilized the "Benchao bazhenfa" (本朝八阵法); the formation is composed of around fourteen-thousand mixed infantry and cavalry, with an additional team of fifty men, which were divided into 280 teams (200 infantry teams and 80 cavalry teams). The teams are organized into seven detachments of central, left and right guards, as well as left and right vanguards and rear-guards. The units would be arranged into tight files of 10-men, and the units arranged to leave enough space in between each other for another unit to occupy. Each unit would complement the other, and defend the rank-and-file next to it in the left. The formation has eight gates, which can quickly close in and surround the enemy from two sides. When attacking, the left and right units would move out to form a pincer attack, and special qi-units are sent to distract and strike in the opposite direction of the intended target to allow the regular zheng-units to attack it and consolidate. The study of baguazhen was not limited to the Song, as Emperor Zhangzong of Jin dynasty notably discussed the bazhen with his chancellor to learn from military tactics of the Song so to better engage their military.

== Cultural references ==
- The formation had been a subject for many ancient Chinese poets, such as Du Fu and Lu Yu.
- In the classic novel Water Margin, jiugong baguazhen is shown as an impressive and deceptive battle tactic studied and deployed by Song Jiang and Wu Yong to defeat the various adversaries of the 108 Heroes of Liangshan, including Tong Guan and Liao forces.
- Baguazhen is the namesake and inspiration for tactics used for Wuziqi and Chinese chess.
- In the classic occult novel Teito Monogatari by Hiroshi Aramata, the representation of Kimon Tonkou magic is based on the stone sentinel maze, based on the bazhentu.
- In the 2008 film Red Cliff, based on the Battle of Red Cliffs, Liu Bei and Sun Quan deployed their troops in the bagua formation. Cao Cao's vanguard army was lured into the formation and suffered a crushing defeat at the hands of the allied forces.
- The formation is referenced in anime Ya Boy Kongming!.

== See also ==
- Qimen Dunjia
- Military history of China before 1912
- Stone Sentinel Maze
- Tactical formation
