= Zhao Gongming =

Chinese god of wealth

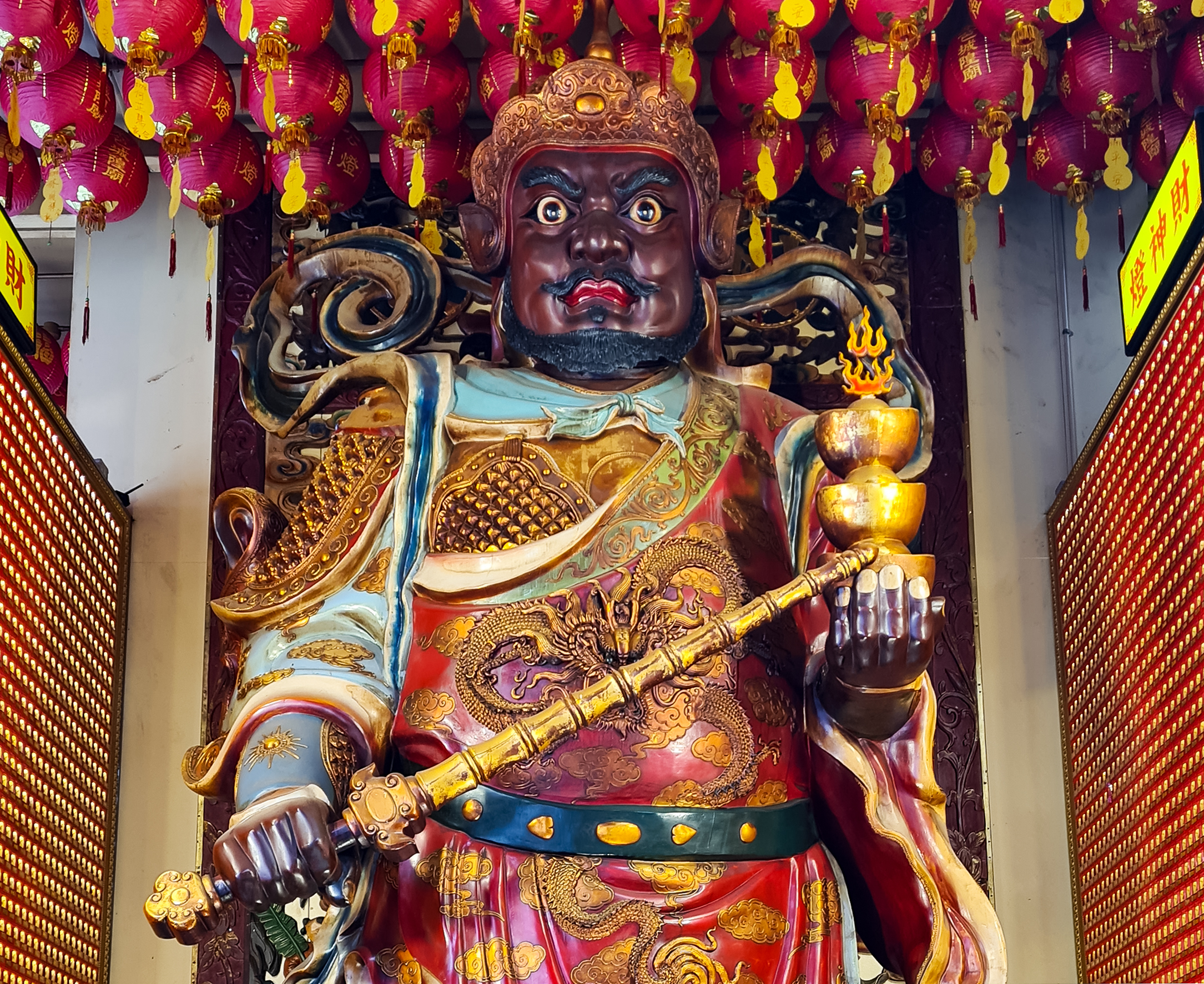
- Statue of the Wealth God Zhao Gongming at Jiucai Pa City God Temple, Singapore.
- Other names: Grand Marshal Zhao; Marshal Zhao; Xuantan Zhenjun; Zhao Gong Yuanshuai
- Affiliation: Chinese folk religion, Taoism
- Abode: Mount Tiantai
- Symbol: Black tiger; iron whip; golden ingot
- Mount: Black tiger
- Gender: Male

Genealogy
- Siblings: Zhao Yunxiao, Zhao Qiongxiao, Zhao Bixiao

Zhao Gongming
- Traditional Chinese: 趙公明
- Simplified Chinese: 赵公明
Transcriptions
Standard Mandarin
- Hanyu Pinyin: Zhào Gōngmíng
- Wade–Giles: Chao^{4} Kung^{1}-ming^{2}
- IPA: [ʈʂâʊ.kʊ́ŋ.mǐŋ]
Yue: Cantonese
- Yale Romanization: Jiuh-gūng-mìhng
- Jyutping: Ziu^{6}-gung^{1}-ming^{4}
- IPA: [tsiw˨ kʊŋ˥ mɪŋ˩]

Zhao Gongming (simplified Chinese: 赵公明; traditional Chinese: 趙公明), also known as Zhao Gong Yuanshuai (趙公元帥, "Marshal Zhao") and Xuantan Zhenjun (玄壇真君, "Genuine Lord of the Dark Altar"), is a god of wealth in Chinese folk religion and Taoism. He is the most widely venerated of the various forms of Caishen, and is conventionally identified as the central figure of the Five Roads Wealth Gods system. Within the Chinese pantheon, Zhao Gongming is the principal Military God of Wealth (武財神; wǔ cáishén), distinguished by his armoured iconography from the Civil Wealth Gods (文財神) such as Bi Gan and Fan Li, who are depicted in court robes. His birthday is commemorated on the fifth day of the first lunar month in widely observed Chinese New Year customs and on the fifteenth day of the third lunar month at his principal cult sites. His common form first appears for the first time in the classic Chinese novel Fengshen Yanyi (封神演义), contrary to claims in Pochu Mixin Quanshu (破除迷信全书, "Comprehensive Book for Eradicating Superstition") that he was a creation of the Song era.

== Origins and legends ==
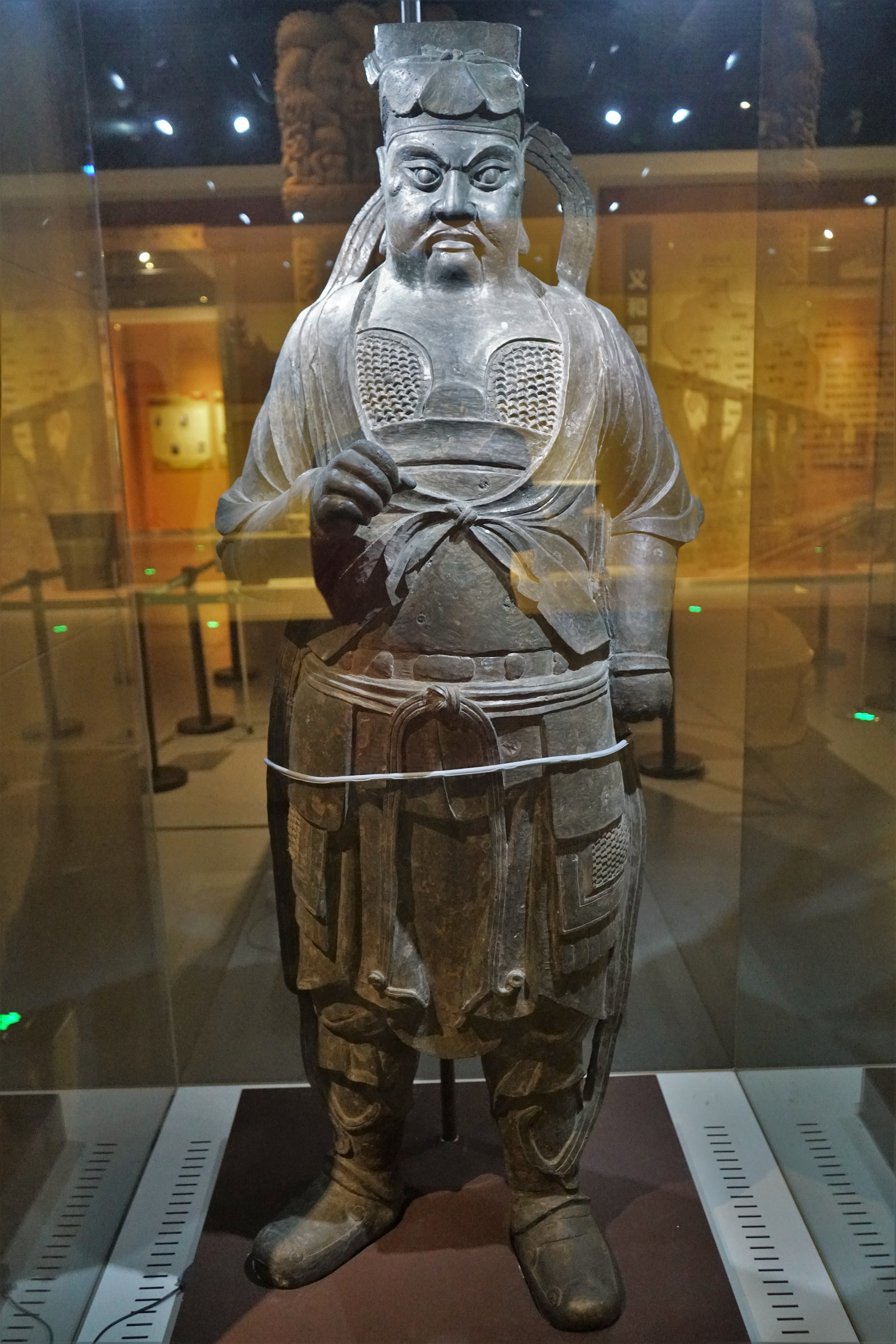
Ming dynasty bronze guardian statue of Zhao Gongming

The legendary biography of Zhao Gongming is composite, layering successive traditions from the Han dynasty through the Ming dynasty. The earliest stratum identifies him as a plague-causing demon-marshal; the Six Dynasties compendium Soushen Ji records him as one of three generals appointed by the Heavenly Emperor to retrieve human souls. The transformation from a plague-marshal into a wealth-bestowing deity took place principally during the Song dynasty and was canonised in the Ming dynasty novel Fengshen Yanyi (Investiture of the Gods), in which Zhao is killed in battle and posthumously deified as the central Lord of the Dark Altar with four wealth-attendant subordinates.

A late tradition preserved in the compilation Dianji Shilu (典籍實錄) associates Zhao Gongming with solar essence; the work is a late editorial compilation rather than a securely dated Han dynasty text, and the sun-essence motif more probably reflects an assimilation to the Hou Yi / Eight Immortals of the Sea cycle.

During the Jin dynasty, the 搜神記 Soushen Ji recorded that "the Heavenly Emperor appointed three generals, Zhao Gongming and Zhong Shiji, each to supervise the subjugation of spirits and the retrieval of human souls".

According to the Biographies of Deities and Immortals (列仙全傳), Zhao Gongming served as the leader of the eight ghostly legions, roaming throughout the mortal realm and causing the violent deaths of countless people. The Grand Supreme Elder Lord (Taishang Laojun) commanded Master Zhang to address this.

According to the religious compendium Sanjiao Soushen Daquan, Zhao Gongming lived during the late Warring States period. When the King of Qin founded the Qin empire, he withdrew to Mount Zhongnan, located in present-day Shaanxi Province in northwest China. There he cultivated Tao and attained the highest state of spiritual enlightenment. During the Eastern Han Dynasty, Zhang Tianshi practiced the art of making pills of immortality and asked the Jade Emperor to send a god to protect him. The Jade Emperor sent Zhao Gongming and conferred upon Zhao the title of "Zhengyi Xuantan Marshal" (正一玄坛元帅). After this, he became known as "Zhao Xuan." He was said to have the ability to control thunder and lightning, ward off plagues and disasters, and generate wealth and treasure.

The Annotated Compilation of Langya Gold and Stone Inscriptions (琅琊金石輯注) states the origin of the God of Wealth, known by the surname Zhao Minglang and the courtesy name Gongming. In a distant era, when the heavens bore ten suns, the Emperor commanded the archer Hou Yi to shoot down nine of them. Eight of these suns descended into the sea and were transformed into immortals, known as the Eight Immortals of the Sea. The remaining sun fell upon Tiantai Mountain, taking the form of a stone known as the Sun Stone. Its essence later assumed human form. As he matured, he journeyed to Emei Mountain to cultivate and acquire the arts of immortality.

During the conflicts between the Shang and Zhou Dynasties, Prime Minister Wen Zhong of the Shang Dynasty invited him to descend from his mountain abode and assist in the battle. However, the Shang forces faced defeat, and Jiang Ziya subsequently caused Zhao Gongming's death through ritual magic. After his death, Jiang Ziya posthumously deified him as the God of Wealth. He was further honored with the title of Xuantan Zhenjun (玄壇真君), and his essence returned to Tiantai Mountain.

In his divine role, Zhao Gongming governs the celestial beings responsible for wealth, the deities associated with the reception of treasures, emissaries for wealth attraction, and the officials of prosperity. Subsequently, a temple was established at the base of the sacred stone to honor him, and Tiantai Mountain was also renamed Mount Cai (財山).

== In Fengshen Yanyi ==
In Fengshen Yanyi, Zhao Gongming was a Taoist hermit with magical powers and a close friend of General Wen Zhong. Through Wen Zhong, King Zhou of Shang sought the assistance of Zhao Gongming. Zhao was killed in a battle against Lu Ya Zhenren, who was aiding the Zhou in overthrowing the Shang. Seeking revenge for their brother, Zhao Gongming's three younger sisters, Zhao Yunxiao, Zhao Qiongxiao, and Zhao Bixiao, were also killed in the war.

Later, during a visit to the temple of Yuan Shi, Jiang Ziya was rebuked for causing Zhao Gongming's death. Following orders, Jiang carried Zhao's corpse into the temple, expressed his remorse for his misdeed, extolled Zhao's virtues, and deified Zhao Gongming as the Genuine God of the Profound Dragon Tiger Altar. As a deity, Zhao's responsibilities include bestowing blessings of auspicious happiness and warding off criminals. Zhao Gongming has four assistant gods: Chen Jiugong, the god of attracting wealth; Xiao Sheng, the god of collecting treasures; Cao Bao, the god of accumulating valuables; and Yao Shaosi, the god of profitability. He and his four disciples are collectively referred to as the "five directions" among the Chinese gods of wealth.

== Historical traditions and birthplace ==
According to the official website of the Zhouzhi County government in Xi'an City, Zhao Gongming was born and raised in Zhaodai Village, Jixian Town, Zhouzhi County, Xi'an City, Shaanxi Province. A fragmentary stele about Zhao Gongming's deeds was engraved in Zhaodai Village in the ninth year of the Wanli Ming Dynasty (1581). The inscription states: "To the northeast of Shuo Jingtai, there is a village called Zhao Dacun. There used to be the Xuan Tan Temple, and the God of Wealth was born there."

== Temples ==
There are many temples dedicated to Zhao Gongming in China, Hong Kong, and Taiwan.

The Mount Tiantai Temple of the God of Wealth is located in Taolu Town, Rizhao City. It is dedicated to the God of Wealth, Zhao Gongming. According to tradition, the 15th day of the third lunar month is celebrated as the birthday of the God of Wealth, Zhao Gongming. Before and after this day, many people from the surrounding areas visit Tian Tai Shan to seek blessings and pay their respects.

In Qinhuangdao, Hebei Province, there exists a street known as Cai Shen Temple Street. Following the passing of Zhao Gongming, his spirit ascended to the Investiture of the Gods platform. Subsequently, Jiang Ziya conferred upon him the title of "God of Wealth," entrusting him with the responsibility of overseeing matters related to wealth and prosperity throughout the land. The three sisters could never forget their affection for their senior brother. Consequently, they constructed a temple dedicated to the God of Wealth in a sunlit location at the base of Jieshi Mountain. This temple served to honor Zhao Gongming and express their profound love for him. Over time, people from various regions seeking good fortune and prosperity congregated in the vicinity of the temple. Gradually, this area evolved into a bustling street, now recognized as Cai Shen Temple Street in Changli City.

In Zhouzhi County, Xi'an, on the eastern bank of the Tianyu River, a cultural area dedicated to the God of Wealth, Zhao Gongming, known as the God of Genuine Wealth, has been established.

== Customs ==
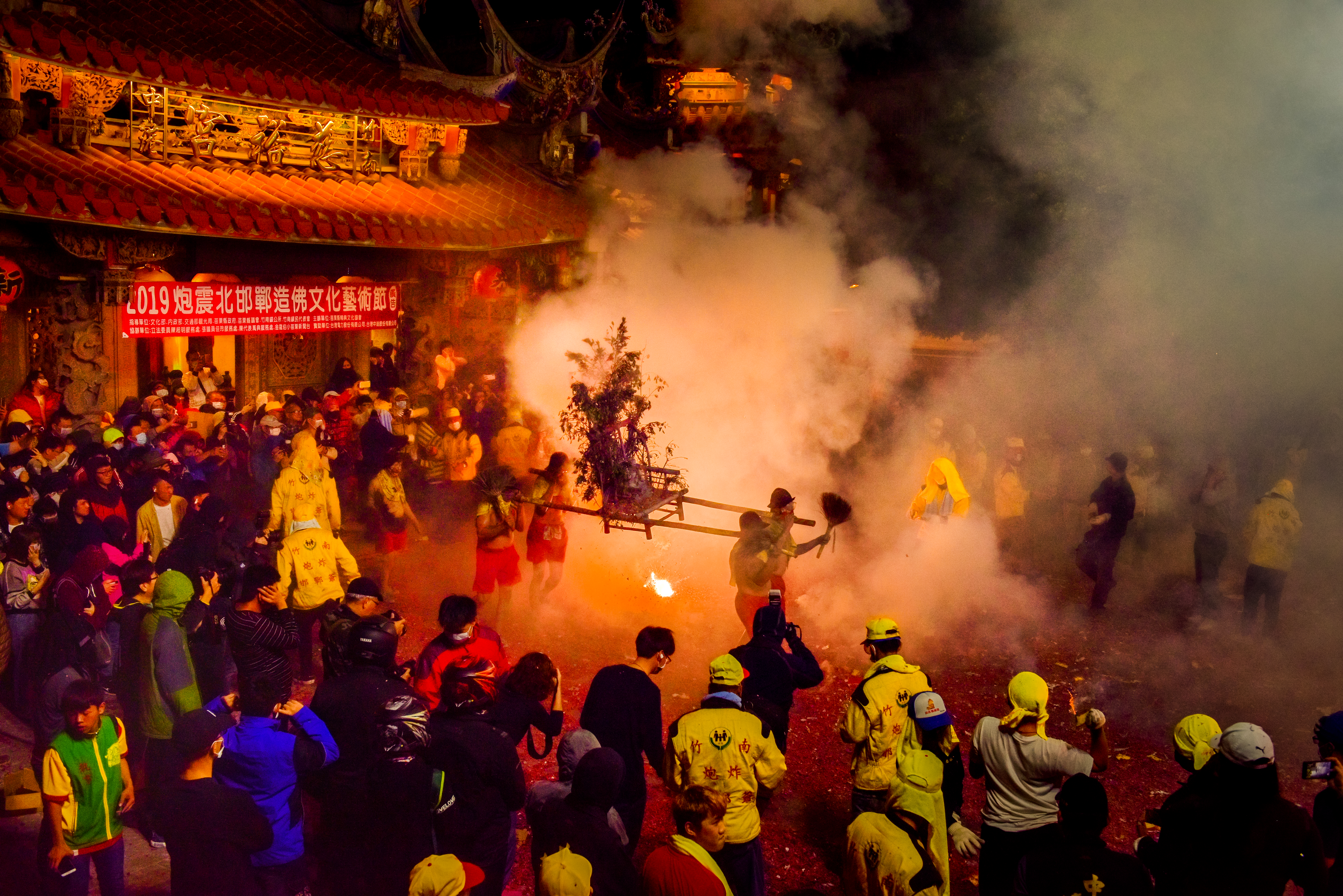
The Zhunan "Bombing Han Dan" ritual

In the northern regions, on the second day of the first lunar month, people hold ceremonies to worship the God of Wealth. Each household conducts a ceremony to honor the wealth deity they received on New Year's Eve, often in the form of roughly printed images. In practice, these images are burned as part of the ritual. At noon on this day, it is customary to eat dumplings, known as "Yuanbao Tang" (元寶湯), symbolizing prosperity. Offerings for the ceremony typically include fish and lamb. In Beijing, prominent businesses conduct grand worship ceremonies, offering the 'Five Big Offerings,' which consist of a whole pig, a whole lamb, a whole chicken, a whole duck, and live red carp. These offerings are made with the hope of achieving prosperity and wealth.

== See also ==
- Caishen
- Bi Gan
- Fan Li
- Guan Yu
