= Randeng Daoren =

Character in the Chinese novel Investiture of the Gods

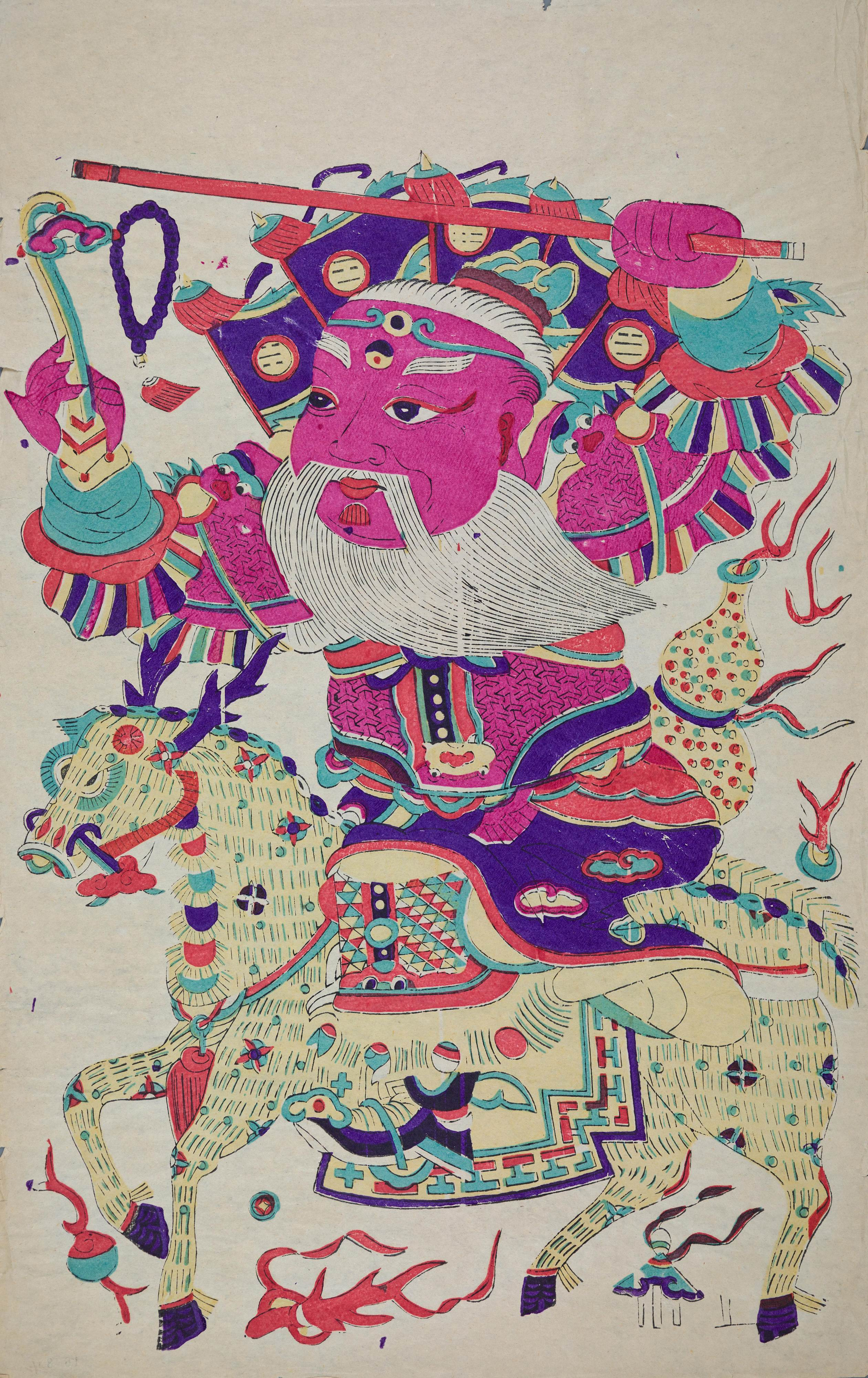
Randeng Daoren in a Taohuawu woodblock print

Randeng Daoren (Chinese: 燃灯道人; pinyin: Rándēng Dàorén) is a character in the Chinese novel Fengshen Yanyi. He lives at Yuanjue Cave (元觉洞) on Mount Lingjiu (灵鹫山) and is a Daoist immortal of Chanjiao.

Randeng Daoren is also shown as a door god in Chinese folk art. He is often paired with Zhao Gongming in traditional New Year woodblock prints.

== In Fengshen Yanyi ==
Randeng Daoren first appears in chapter 14, when Nezha attempts to kill his father, Li Jing. Taiyi Zhenren had asked Randeng Daoren to intervene and help resolve the conflict between Nezha and Li Jing. When Nezha attacks him, Randeng Daoren uses a white lotus to block Nezha's spear.

Randeng Daoren then gives Li Jing a golden pagoda and instructs him to use it if Nezha refuses to submit. When Nezha attacks again, Randeng Daoren uses the pagoda to trap him and threatens to burn him inside it. Nezha eventually agrees to recognize Li Jing as his father. Randeng Daoren then tells Li Jing to withdraw from public office and remain in seclusion until King Wu raises an army against the Shang dynasty, at which point Li Jing is to emerge and assist the Zhou.

Randeng Daoren later appears during the war between the Zhou and Shang forces. In chapter 63, he captures Yuyi Xian after the latter joins the Shang side, and makes him become his disciple.

== In Chinese folk religion ==
Randeng Daoren is depicted as a military door god in some Chinese New Year woodblock prints. Some examples pair him with Zhao Gongming.
