= Lu Ya Zhenren =

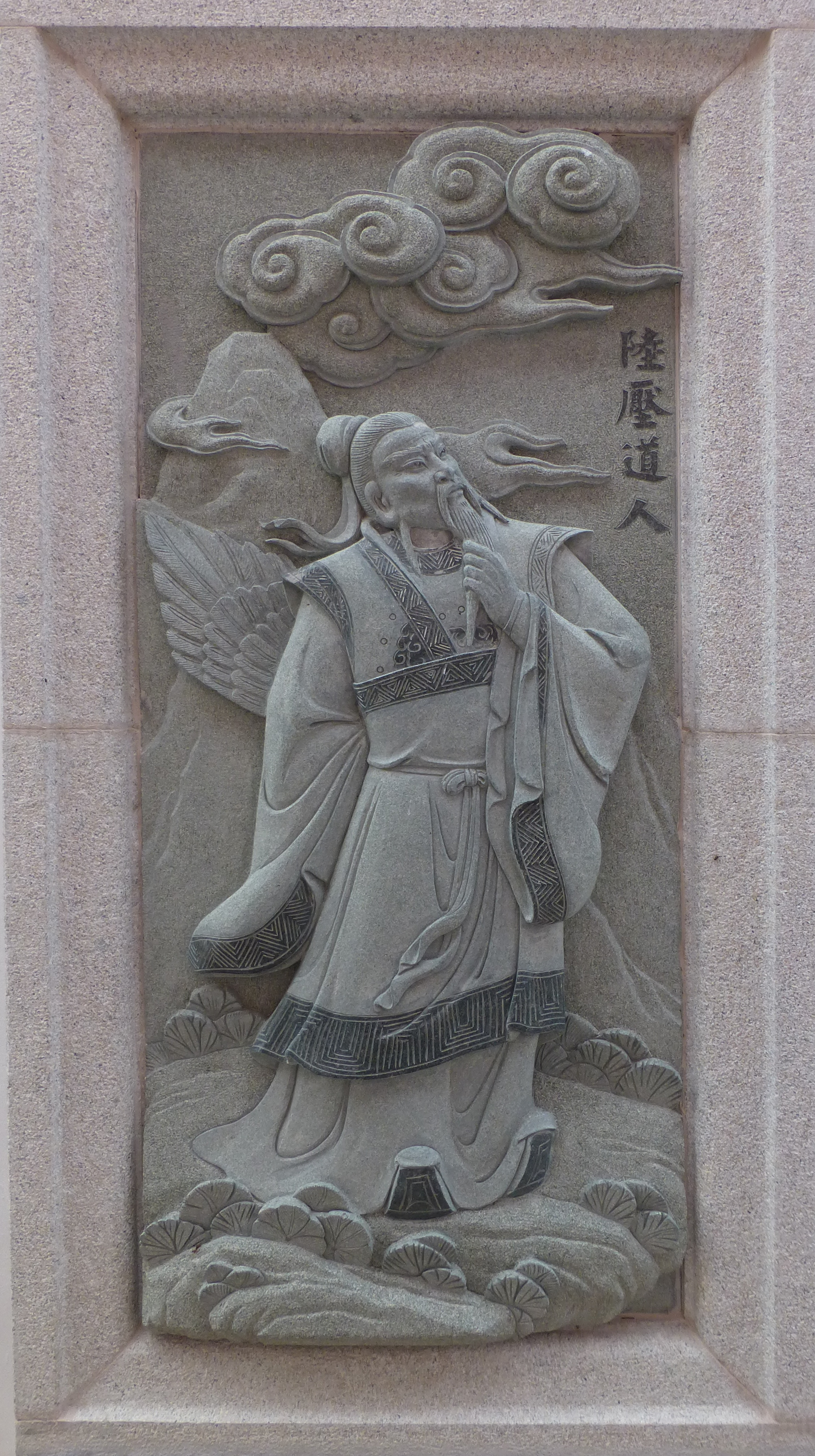
Relief of Lu Ya Daoren at Ping Sien Si Temple, Malaysia.

Lu Ya Zhenren (Chinese: 陸壓真人; pinyin: Lù Yā Zhēnrén), commonly known as Lu Ya (陸壓), is an immortal from the classic Chinese gods-and-demons novel Investiture of the Gods (Fengshen Yanyi). Although portrayed as an independent immortal (sanxian) in the novel, scholars have identified the character as a literary adaptation of the Daoist immortal Lü Dongbin.

== Legend ==
=== In Fengshen Yanyi ===
Lu Ya Zhenren is an independent immortal, or sanxian (散仙), from the Western Kunlun Mountains (西昆仑). He belongs to neither the Chan Sect nor the Jie Sect. When he visits Jiang Ziya at the Zhou camp, he describes himself as a wanderer who travels wherever he wishes. He says that he does not bow to Laozi or answer to the immortals of Yuxu Palace. His poem also speaks of his cultivation since the earliest times.

Lu Ya arrives when Zhao Gongming is fighting the Chan Sect immortals. Zhao has defeated several of them with his Dinghai Pearls (定海珠) and Golden Dragon Scissors (金蛟剪). Lu Ya offers Jiang Ziya the Nail-Head Seven Arrows Book (钉头七箭书), which gives instructions for killing Zhao through a ritual. Jiang sets up an altar on Mount Qi and places a straw figure bearing Zhao's name on it. He prays before the figure three times a day for twenty-one days. On the final day, Lu Ya brings him a bow and three peach-wood arrows. Jiang shoots the figure in both eyes and the heart, and Zhao dies in the Shang camp.

Another of his weapons is the Immortal-Slaying Flying Knife (斩仙飞刀), which he keeps in a red gourd. When he opens it, a white light rises from the gourd and reveals a small figure with eyes and wings. Lu Ya bows to it and says, "Treasure, please turn around" (请宝贝转身). The figure turns and cuts off the enemy's head. Lu Ya first uses it against Bai Li (白礼), the master of the Blazing Flame Array. He later kills Yu Yuan (余元) and Qiu Yin (丘引) with the same weapon.

Lu Ya can turn himself into a rainbow to escape danger. The Sanxiao Sisters once capture him with their Golden Dipper and tie him to a pole. Soldiers shoot arrows at him, but the arrows turn to ashes. When the sisters try to use the Golden Dragon Scissors against him, he escapes as a rainbow. He escapes in the same way when Kong Xuan attacks him with the Five-Colored Light (五色神光).

Before leaving the Zhou army, Lu Ya gives his flying knife to Jiang Ziya, saying that Jiang will need it for the troubles ahead. Jiang later uses the knife to execute Daji. The soldiers sent to kill her had been unable to do so because of her magic.

=== Chaoshan folklore ===
In Chaoshan folklore, Lu Ya is said to have lived before the creation of heaven and earth. One account names Hongjun Laozu and Haichao Shengren (海潮聖人) as his creators. Lu Ya later became the teacher of the Jade Emperor.

=== Regional oral folklore ===
Some folk tales call Lu Ya Liuya Daoren (六鸭道人, "Six Ducks Daoist"), a name that plays on the sound of ya (鸭, "duck"). One of these tales begins with a great flood. Liuya, who is a duck, survives the flood and finds a large gourd floating on the water. A snake lives inside the gourd. Liuya sits on it until Hongjun Laozu is born from it. They later argue about which of them is older, and Liuya claims that he came first.

In this tale, Zhao Gongming is killed through a ritual lasting forty-nine days. Liuya learns the date and hour of Zhao's birth while flying over a forest when Zhao is born. Many years later, he uses this knowledge to cast a spell on a straw figure. In Fengshen Yanyi, Zhao is killed by a similar spell after only twenty-one days.

Flood stories from Jiangsu give ducks a part in the creation of the world. The Anthology of Chinese Folk Tales: Jiangsu Volume (中国民间故事集成·江苏卷) records two names for the duck figure: Lüya Daoren (绿鸭道人, "Green Duck Daoist") in Funing County, and Lu Ya (陆鸭, "Land Duck") in Danyang. With the world still covered by water, the duck dives down to bring up mud or sand from the bottom. Some tellings have Rulai Buddha send it on this task. The mud is used to make flat land, while stones become mountains. People in Danyang also have a saying about Lu Ya's age: "First there was earth, then heaven; Land Duck came before them" (先有地，后有天，陆鸭在之先).

== Interpretations ==
Lu Ya helps Jiang Ziya in the war but belongs to neither the Chan Sect nor the Jie Sect. He asks for no reward and leaves when his work is done. Huang Ximon believes that Lu Ya represents the Daoist wish to live freely, without serving a ruler or seeking power. He compares Lu Ya to Lü Dongbin, one of the Eight Immortals.

There is another link to Lü Dongbin in Lu Ya's opening poem. Lu Ya calls himself a "guest from Kunlun" (昆仑客). In Lü Dongbin's poem Qixi (七夕), the words are "guest from Tiantai" (天台客). Both poems also have the line "石桥南畔有旧宅" ("an old home south of the stone bridge"). Chen Hong of Nankai University believes that the author used Lü Dongbin as a model for Lu Ya. Lü Dongbin was widely worshipped during the Ming dynasty, when Fengshen Yanyi was written.

Lu Ya may also be a clue to the identity of the novel's author. One possible author is Lu Xixing, a Ming dynasty Daoist from Xinghua. He was buried in a village called Luyazi (陆鸭子). In the local dialect, the ya (压) in Lu Ya's name (陆压) sounds like ya (鸭, "duck") in the village's name. Mo Qikang believes that Lu Xixing may have used this name to put a part of his own identity into the novel. Chen Hong also links Lu Ya to Lu Xixing's Daoist beliefs and his worship of Lü Dongbin. The author of Fengshen Yanyi is still disputed. Xu Zhonglin and Li Yunxiang have also been named as possible authors.

== Worship ==
Lu Ya is worshipped in the Chaoshan region of Guangdong. A local story tells of Japanese planes bombing Jinghai, in Huilai County, in April 1935. Some residents were said to have seen Lu Ya in the sky holding a flower basket. He caught the falling bombs and sent them into the water, where they exploded. The town was saved, and local people continued to worship him.

In Hong Kong, Lu Ya is worshipped at Lingnan Ancient Temple (嶺南古廟) in Yau Tong. The temple has statues of Lu Ya Zhenren (陸壓真人) and Lu Ya Zhenjun (陸壓真君). Although their names differ by only one character, they are regarded as different gods. Lu Ya Zhenren is said to have existed before heaven and earth were formed, while Lu Ya Zhenjun is a land god (土地伯公) who guards the Eastern Gate of Heaven. Lingnan Ancient Temple is the only temple in Hong Kong recorded by Zhou Shujia as worshipping Lu Ya Zhenjun.

== In popular culture ==
In some Chinese web novels, Lu Ya is one of the ten Golden Crows. In Buddha is the Dao (佛本是道), he is the youngest son of Donghuang Taiyi (东皇太一). His nine brothers are killed, but Lu Ya survives. He later lives in the Western Kunlun Mountains. Other stories say that his father is Di Jun. The novel Xiao Jinwu yu Dadaozu (小金乌与大道祖) tells how Lu Ya survives when Hou Yi shoots down his nine brothers. This part of his life is not found in Fengshen Yanyi.

There is a saying about Lu Ya being older than Hongjun Laozu: "First there was Hongjun, then heaven; Lu Ya was there even before" (先有鸿钧后有天，陆压道君还在前). The saying is known from Suzhou pingtan storytelling and is also used in online fiction. Another story says that Lu Ya learned from the Founding Spirit (创始元灵). Hongjun Laozu, Hunkun Zushi (混鲲祖师), and Nüwa are named as his fellow disciples. These stories are not part of the original Fengshen Yanyi.
