= Gong (title) =

[公] the highest title of Chinese nobles

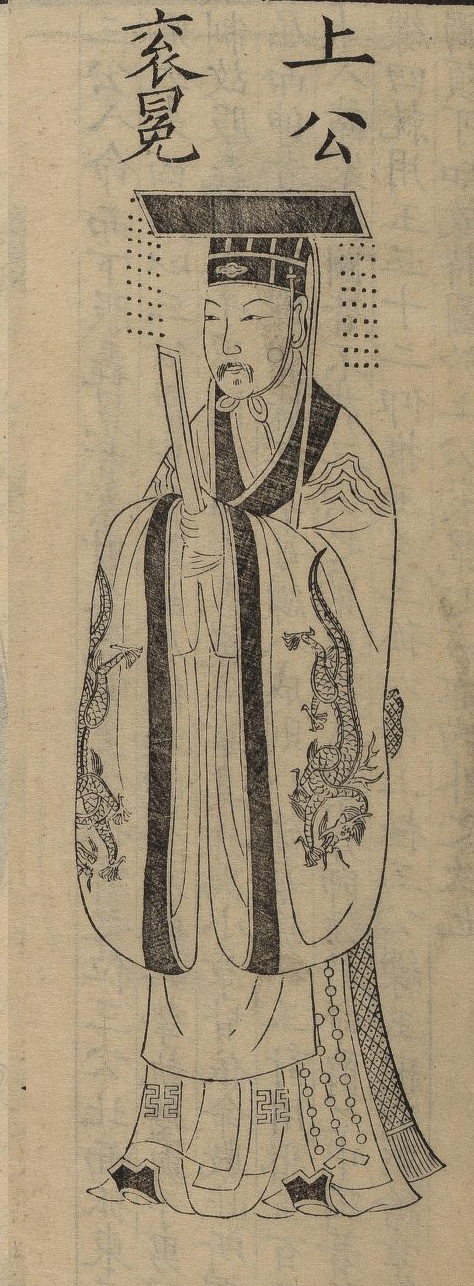
- Gong wearing ceremonial gunmian (袞冕), as according to Zhou etiquette.
- Chinese: 公
Transcriptions
Standard Mandarin
- Hanyu Pinyin: gōng
- Wade–Giles: kung
Yue: Cantonese
- Jyutping: gung^{1}
Middle Chinese
- Middle Chinese: /kuwng/
Old Chinese
- Zhengzhang: /*kloːŋ/

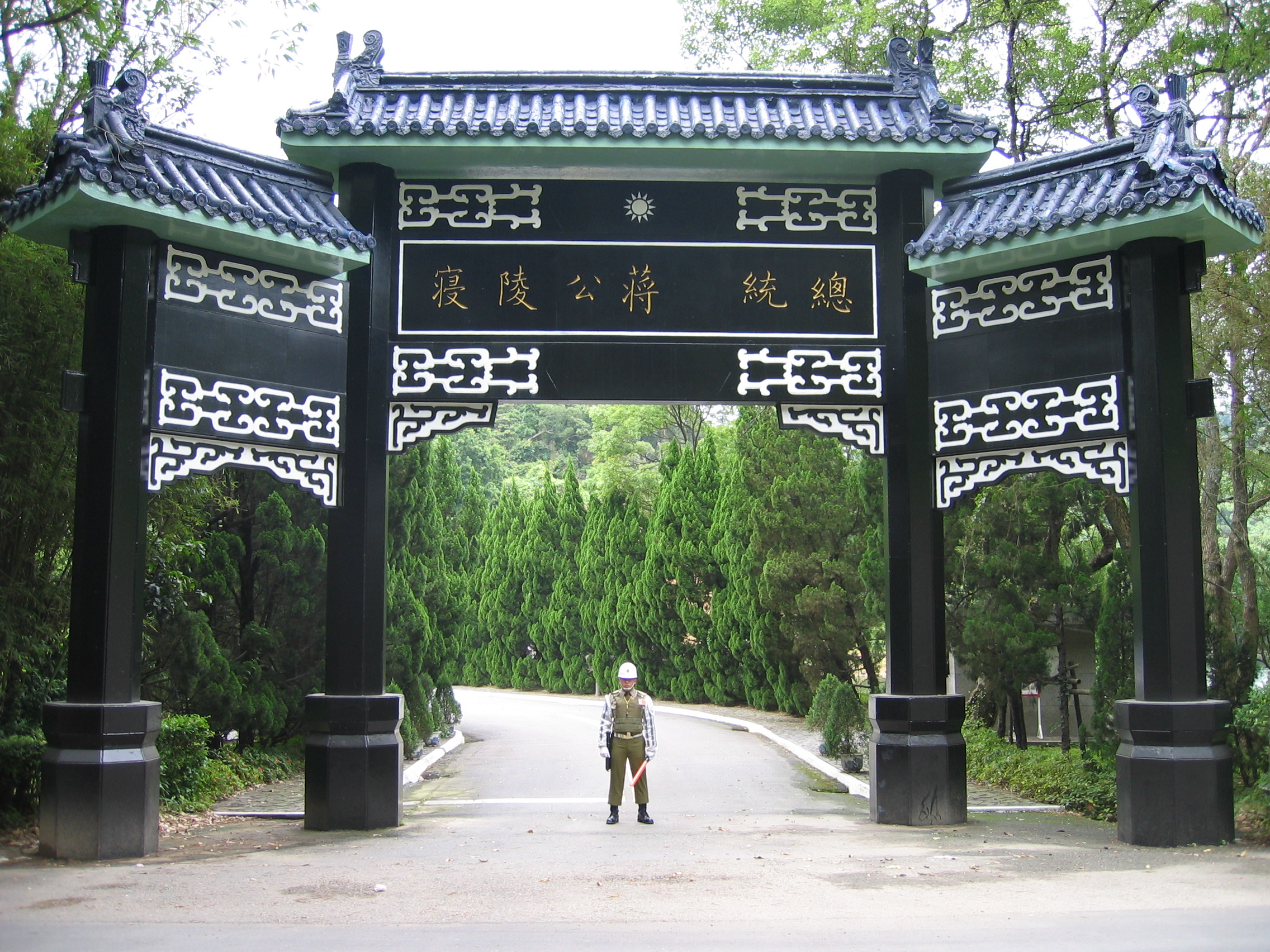
Gong used for Chiang Kai-shek on the paifang at the Cihu Mausoleum in Taiwan

Gong was a title of ancient and imperial Chinese nobility roughly equivalent to and usually translated as duke. It was also historically used within Chinese fiefs as a respectful term of address to any living liege (similar to the English "lord") and is still used in modern Chinese as a respectful term of address for any man of high status (similar to "sir"), particularly for the honored deceased as with formal reference to Chiang Kai-shek as Jiǎng Gōng (蔣公) in Taiwan.

== Name ==
Within the Chinese language, the same character 公 (gōng) is used as a noun in the terms for respected male relatives (e.g. 老公, lǎogōng, "husband", and 外公, wàigōng, "maternal grandfather") and as an adjective in the terms for various male animals (e.g. 公牛, gōngniú, "bull", and 公羊, gōngyáng, "ram" or "billy goat"). Paul R. Goldin has argued for its etymological relationship with 翁 (wēng), with their shared original term having meant "respected elder".

The typical English translation within aristocratic ancient and imperial Chinese contexts is "duke", although Creel has proposed translating it under the Western Zhou as "lord" and as "duke" only beginning with the Eastern Zhou.

== History ==
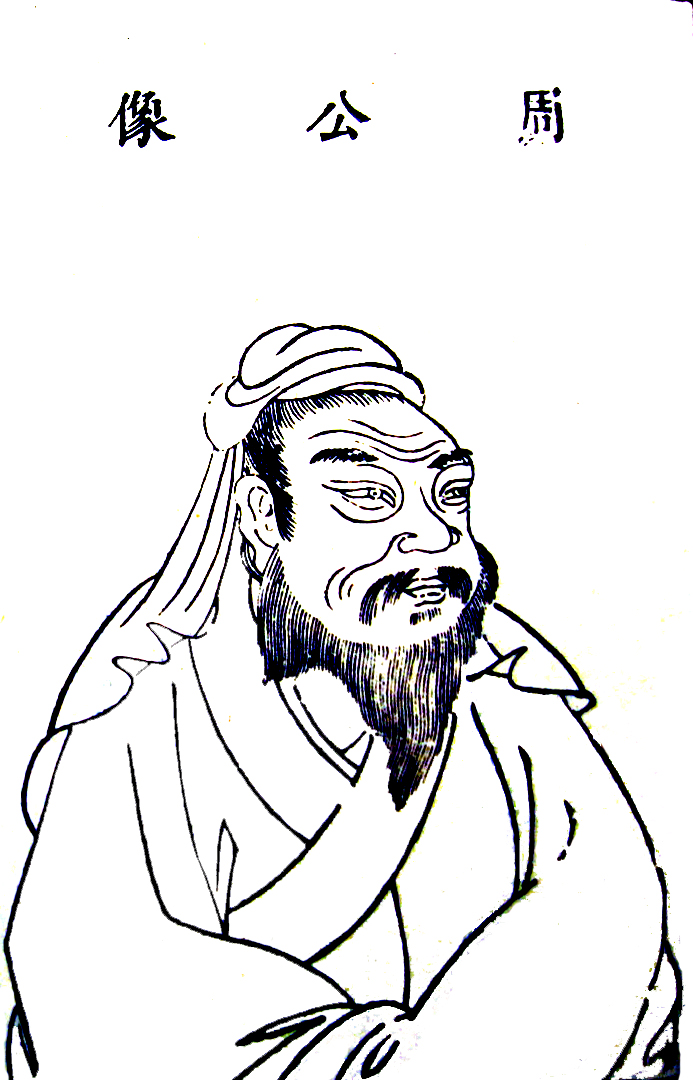
The portrait of the Duke of Zhou from the Wangs' Sancai Tuhui (c. 1607)

By the time of the Zhou dynasty, the title gong was used alongside other familial titles for important members of the royal Ji family outside the immediate line of succession. The regents of the Cheng King—his uncles Dan and Shi and the important vassal Lü Shang—were known to history as Zhou Gong, Shao Gong, and Jiang Ziya. His uncles Xian, Du, and Chu who acted as the "Three Guards" of the eastern territories before their rebellion against the regency were likewise known by the somewhat lower rank of shū (叔), now used for younger paternal uncles or male friends of the family.

Subsequently, the Three Excellencies, the highest Zhou government ministers, bore the title gong, as did the highest ranking rulers of the kingdom's fiefs even when—like the Shang rulers of Song—they came from outside the royal family. The Xiang Duke of Song (r. 650–637 BC) even became one of the Five Hegemons of the Spring and Autumn period, before such lords began to use the title of king. During the rites of ancestral veneration, any ancestor of great antiquity could be accorded the title gong regardless of their proper title in life; this was sometimes a formal upgrade, as when Jiang Ziya's fief of Qi became a duchy and he was posthumously promoted to the title of gong himself. The name was also used by courtiers and others to address ruling nobles of any formal rank within their own states.

Under the Han and subsequent dynasties, wang—previously the royal title of the Xia, Shang, and Zhou sovereigns—came to be used for senior princes and vassal rulers who controlled the more important primary divisions of the empire. At this time, gong came into use for nominal or actual lords of its more important secondary divisions.

With the rise of notional titles, some of the dukedoms acquired literary rather than territorial designations. The primary example is how, under the Northern Song, the emperor Renzong made the title Duke Yansheng—"Overflowing with Wisdom"—hereditary within the line of direct descent from Confucius. This was converted to a cabinet-level political office of the Republic of China in 1935 and an uncompensated honorary title on Taiwan in 2008.

== See also ==
- Chinese nobility
