= Rebellion of the Three Guards =

c. 1042–1039 BC war in Zhou dynasty China

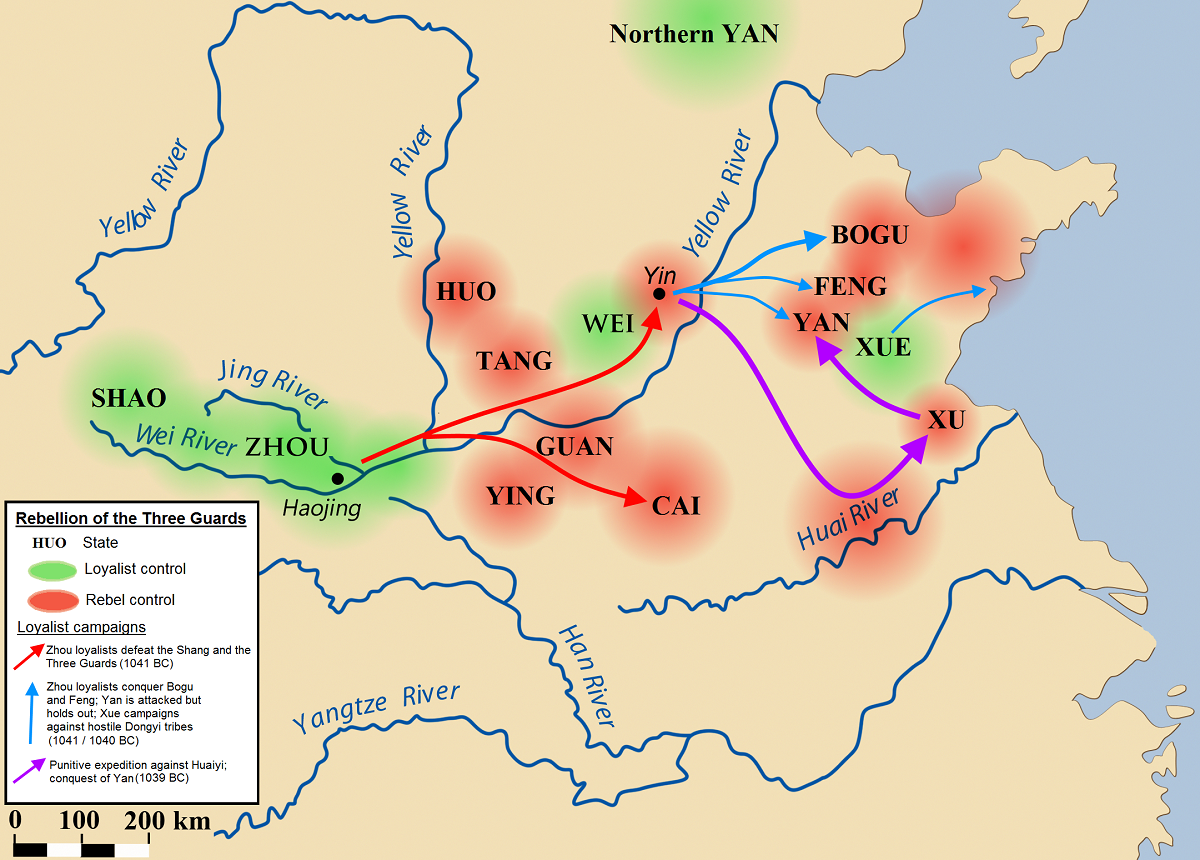
- Approximate areas under Zhou loyalist (green) and rebel control (red). Loyalist reconquest of North China Plain (dark red), Zhou conquest of western Shandong (light blue), and loyalist campaigns against last rebel strongholds (purple).
Date	c. 1042–1039 BC
Location	Northeast China
Result	Zhou loyalist victory
Territorial changes	Zhou dynasty secures Central Plain and conquers western Shandong; several rebel states are dismantled

Belligerents
Zhou loyalists: Zhou royal domain; State of Shao; State of Wey; State of Northern Yan; State of Lian; State of Xue; Other loyalist states	Three Guards, separatists and Shang loyalists: State of Guan; State of Cai; State of Huo; Shang domain of Yin (Bei); State of Ying; State of Tang; Other rebel states; Dongyi and Huaiyi: State of Yan (Note: Not to be confused with Northern Yan, this state was located in the Shandong region, centered at Qufu. The state of Yan (奄) was alternatively known as "Gai" (盖). The two words had very similar shapes in the early form of the written language.); State of Pugu; State of Xu; State of Xiong; State of Feng; Many other tribes and states

Commanders and leaders
Duke of Zhou; King Cheng of Zhou; Duke of Shao; Duke Lü Shang; Viscount Qi of Wey; Grand Invocator Qin; Duke Ke of Shao; Duke of Lian; Commander Zhi; Commander Qian	Shu Xian of Guan (executed); Shu Du of Cai (POW); Shu Chu of Huo (Note: The involvement of Huoshu is disputed. Some scholars like Cui Shu and Liu Qiyu maintain that only two brothers - Guanshu and Caishu - rebelled.); Wu Geng †; Ruler of Tang (executed); Marquis of Yan (POW); Elder of Feng †

Casualties and losses
- Unknown

The Rebellion of the Three Guards (Note: Also called the "Three Overseers", or "Three Governors".) (simplified Chinese: 三监之乱; traditional Chinese: 三監之亂; pinyin: Sān Jiàn zhī Luàn), or less commonly the Wu Geng Rebellion (simplified Chinese: 武庚之乱; traditional Chinese: 武庚之亂), was a civil war, instigated by an alliance of discontent Zhou princes, Shang loyalists, vassal states and other non-Zhou peoples against the Western Zhou government under the Duke of Zhou's regency in late 11th century BC.

After the fall of the Shang dynasty, King Wu of Zhou had appointed his younger brothers Shu Xian of Guan, Shu Du of Cai and Shu Chu of Huo as the "Three Guards" of the East to secure the newly conquered Shang lands. After his death and his young son King Cheng's coronation, King Wu's brother Dan, the Duke of Zhou, declared himself regent and took over the court. This aroused the anger of the Three Guards who suspected Dan of usurpation and believed that they should serve as regents. The Three Guards allied with many separatist eastern nobles, Shang loyalists under Prince Wu Geng, and several Dongyi and Huaiyi (淮夷) states in rebellion. The Duke of Zhou then launched a second "eastern campaign" to put down the rebellion, and defeated the rebels in three years, killing or disempowering their leaders. In doing so, he also further expanded the authority of Zhou kingdom into East China, transforming it into an empire using the new Fengjian system.

Edward L. Shaughnessy called the rebellion "a succession crisis that has come to be seen as defining moment not only for the Western Zhou dynasty but for the entire history of Chinese statecraft".

== Prelude ==
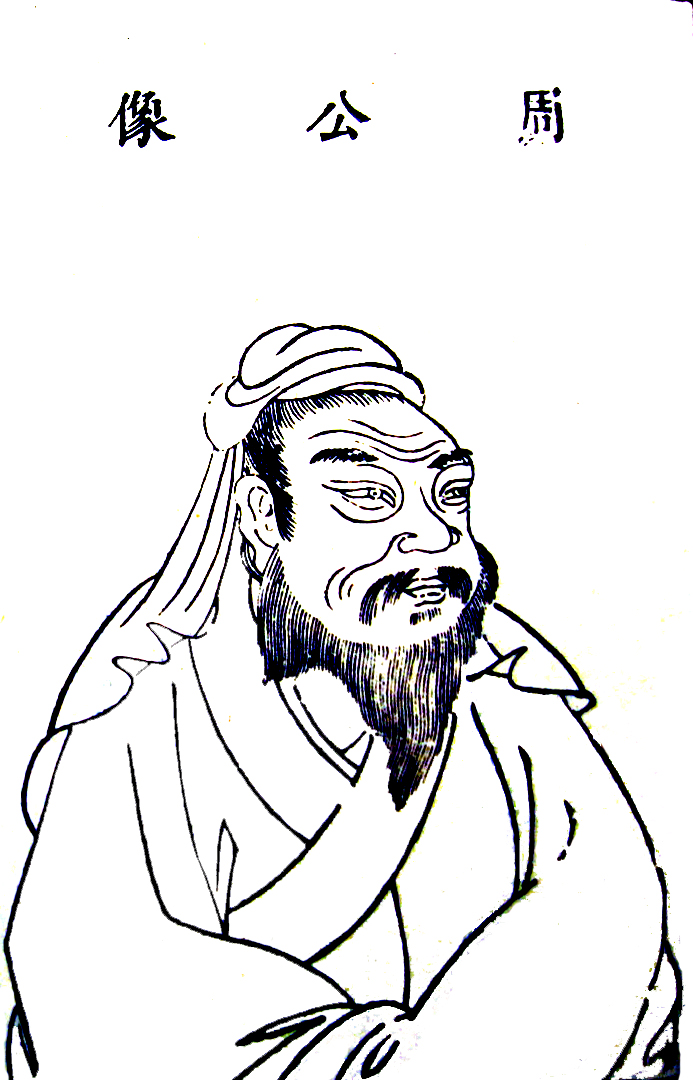
The Duke of Zhou's seizure of power was one of the major causes for the rebellion.

In 1059 BC, an extremely rare planetary conjunction occurred as Mercury, Venus, Mars, Jupiter, and Saturn were visible in the northwestern sky over northern China, grouped closely together. This was taken by the Zhou people as sign of great importance, showcasing that their ruler had been granted the "Mandate of Heaven". (Note: Sarah Allan notes that epigraphic evidence lacks specifics of the nature of the celestial phenomenon announcing King Wen's receipt of the Mandate. David Pankenier, crediting the planetary conjunction, notes that Comet 1/P Halley also appeared that same year.) Declaring himself king, Wen of Zhou broke away from his previous overlords, the Shang dynasty, and launched a war for dominance over China. The Zhou consolidated the territories surrounding their homeland in the Wei River valley under King Wen. Following his death, his son King Wu of Zhou defeated the Shang dynasty and conquered the latter's capital of Yin in 1046 BC.

The Zhou dynasty supplanted the old Shang rule, but uncertainty and unrest remained. Most of the eastern vassal states remained loyal to the fallen Shang dynasty and resented the new "barbarian" rulers. King Wu recognized this, and appointed the last Shang king Di Xin's son Wu Geng as the deputy ruler of the east. He hoped that by doing so, the Zhou could rule the eastern lands through a Shang prince. Still wary of possible revolts against his rule, King Wu left his three brothers Shu Xian of Guan, Shu Du of Cai, and Shu Chu of Huo (霍叔處) as the "Three Overseers" of the newly conquered lands and ordered them to watch over Wu Geng and the other eastern nobles. But not only the states of the Central Plain wanted to restore the Shang dynasty. Many Dongyi tribes and states of Shandong were "Shang strongholds" with strong cultural and political ties to the fallen regime, as they had served as the late dynasty's allies and vassals for over two centuries. Among them, only the state of Xue in southern Shandong welcomed the rise of the Zhou dynasty, as it had long fought the Shang for independence.

After ordering the eastern lands, King Wu returned west to his capital Fenghao, where he appointed his other brothers, Dan, the Duke of Zhou and Shi, the Duke of Shao, royal chancellor and "Grand Protector", respectively. These two quickly became the two most powerful figures at the court.

King Wu died around 1043 BC, leaving the throne to his eldest son, Song, to be known as King Cheng of Zhou. The Duke of Zhou, however, claimed that King Cheng was too young to rule, which was probably untrue. Either way, he declared himself regent for Cheng and took over the court. Despite some initial criticism, Dan managed to win over the most important court members, and firmly established his position at the capital. Together with his half-brother (Note: Not all scholars agree that the Duke of Zhou was the half-brother of the Duke of Shao, who may have descended from a separate branch lineage.) Duke of Shao and King Cheng, he formed a ruling triumvirate with himself as de facto leader. In the East, however, the Duke of Zhou's takeover caused great resentment among the Three Guards, as Guanshu and Caishu suspected their brother of usurpation. Furthermore, Guanshu was older than Dan, and the traditional line of seniority would have favored him as regent. According to Li Feng, communication in the Western Zhou period would also take forty to sixty days to traverse the difficult mountain roads in western Henan, causing "a problem of miscommunication and therefore mistrust between the Zhou commanders stationed on the eastern plain and the new leadership in the capital." In 1042 BC, the second year of the Duke of Zhou's regency, Guanshu and Caishu finally instigated Wu Geng and his followers to rise in rebellion. (Note: An excavated manuscript first studied in 2008, part of the Tsinghua Bamboo Slips, states that the Three Guards – whom it does not name – were killed by the Shang rebels rather than assisting them. This alternative account is distinct to all received sources.)

== War ==
The two rebellious brothers quickly convinced Huoshu of the rightfulness of their cause, uniting the Three Guards against the Duke of Zhou. They and the Shang loyalists were soon joined by many independent-minded nobles, especially from the southeast. Large swaths of the Zhou dynasty's eastern realm rose against the official government at Fenghao, including some states that controlled crucial passes and routes. The rebel state of Ying, for example, "was located near the exit of the Ying River valley connecting with the Luoyang plain and right at the entrance to the Nanyang Basin, controlling the road to the middle Yangtze region". Furthermore, the rebels were able to gain several external allies. Led by the states of Pugu and Yan, powerful Shang sympathizers, most of the Dongyi polities of Shandong rallied to the rebel cause. Even some Huaiyi tribes, which controlled the Huai River region and had little connection to either the Zhou or the Shang, joined the rebel forces. Among them was the state of Xu, which would grow into one of the Zhou dynasty's greatest enemies.

Some vassal states in the east remained loyal, however, such as Song under Weizi Qi, and Northern Yan under the Marquis Ke, son of the Duke of Shao. Among the eastern loyalists was also the aforementioned Dongyi state of Xue, which had no desire for the restoration of the Shang dynasty. The Records of the Grand Historian reported the existence of two more loyalist states in Shandong at the time, Qi and Lu, but this is not supported by other textual or archaeological sources.

After being informed of the revolt, King Cheng allegedly performed turtle shell divination in an attempt to determine whether or not to attack his uncles. The oracles regarding such an attack were auspicious, but the king's advisors all urged him to disregard them in the face of the difficulty of an offensive and the unrest among the people. The king acknowledged this difficulty and disquietude, but refused to go against the apparent will of Heaven. The Duke of Zhou, eager to regain the east, probably supported the king's decision.

At first, the remaining loyalist states in the East had to bear the bulk of the fighting, as the government needed not only much time to mobilize its forces, but also at least two months to move them out of the Wei River valley and deploy them on the eastern plain. As result, the rebels remained largely unchallenged for almost a year. After the long preparations, however, the dukes of Zhou and Shao finally launched the second "eastern campaign" to put down the rebellion. Bronze inscriptions of the time suggest that King Cheng himself participated in the counter-insurgency campaign as commander, further disproving the later claim that he was a child at the time.

Aided by the military strategists Lü Shang, the loyalists exterminated the Shang loyalists in the second year of the rebellion after hard fighting that saw the complete destruction of Yin and the death of Prince Wu Geng. The Three Guards' main force was also defeated, and Guanshu Xian and Huoshu Chu were captured, while Caishu Du fled into exile or was banished. Guanshu was executed and Huoshu stripped of his titles and demoted to a commoner. Despite his victory, the Duke of Zhou pressed on and further campaigned against the eastern rebel allies that were located beyond the Zhou kingdom's borders. Shortly after the Three Guards' defeat, the loyalists advanced into Shandong, with the Duke of Zhou personally commanding the conquest of Feng and Pugu. Yan was also attacked by loyalist forces, but managed to hold out. In the war's third year, the Zhou royal army led by King Cheng and the Duke of Zhou conducted a punitive expedition against the Huai peoples and thereupon attacked Yan again, finally defeating it. Overall, Dan's forces brought several peoples of the eastern seaboard under Zhou rule, expanding the kingdom greatly.

== Aftermath ==
=== Reform of the Zhou kingdom ===
The territory of the Western Zhou after the Fengjian system's implementation.

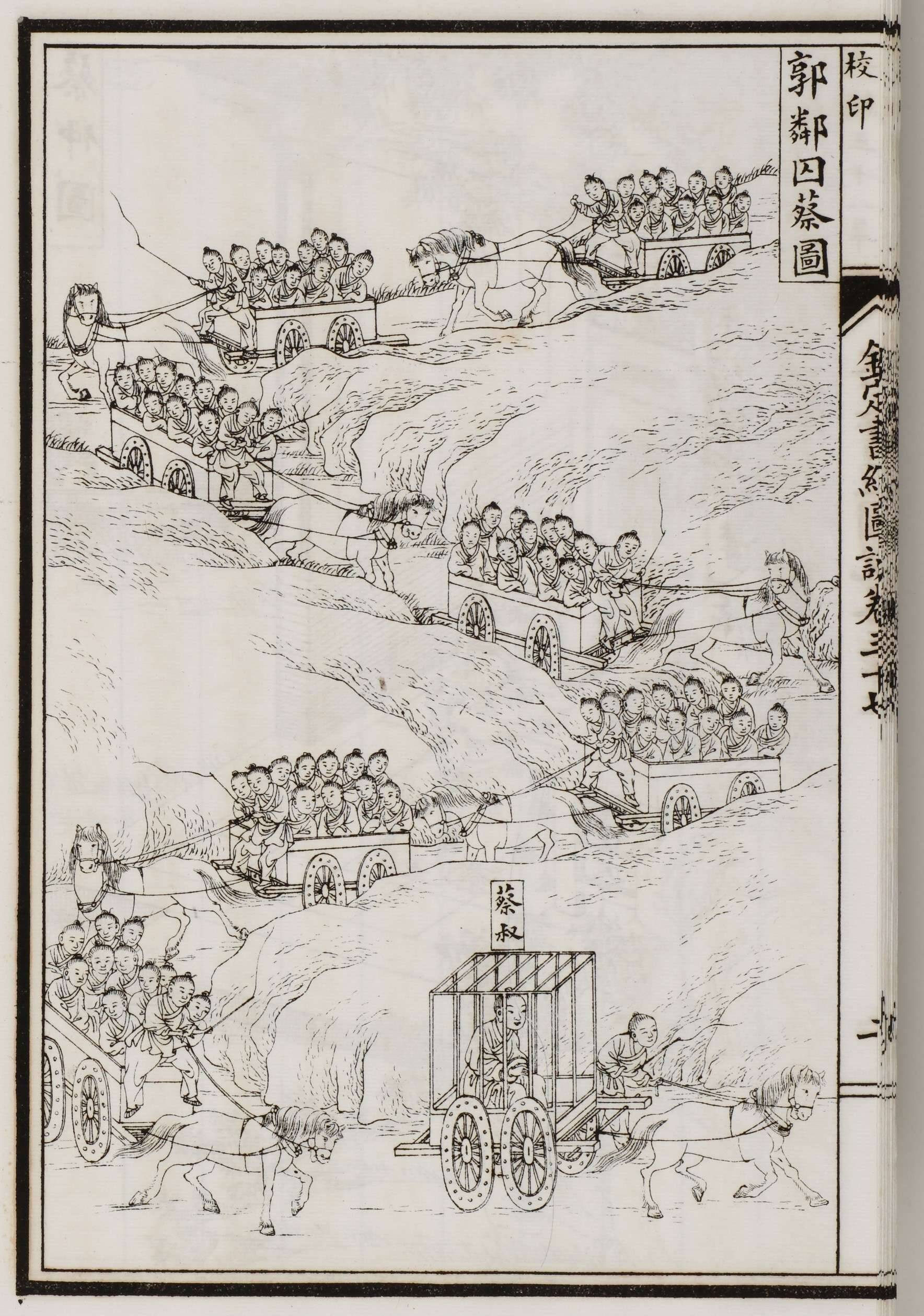
Illustration of Duke Qin imprisoning the Shu Du of Cai from the Imperial Illustrated Edition of the Book of Documents.

Following the rebellion, the Duke of Zhou established the new Fengjian system in order to consolidate the Zhou rule and to stabilize the kingdom. The vassal states of the Zhou kingdom were reorganized: Two thirds of the states were bestowed to members of the royal family and families loyal to them, while members of the house of Shang and their allies were transferred to distant fiefs where they could not pose a threat to the central kingdom. The fiefs that were given to members of the royal family were generally placed at strategic points all along the two main geographic axes of north China, the Yellow River and the Taihang Mountains. The "Fengjian enfeoffment system would become the foundation of Zhou rule and the dynasty's crowning achievement". The rebel states of Guan, Yan, Pugu, and Cai were dissolved, though the latter was later revived. The territories of Yan and Pugu were annexed into the newly founded states of Lu and Qi, respectively. The Shang royal domain at Yin was dismantled and integrated into Wey, which was given to Kangshu Feng, a loyalist uncle of King Cheng. Meanwhile, Weizi Qi, who was Wu Geng's uncle but had remained loyal throughout the revolt, was enfeoffed with the state of Song, an ancient cultural center of the Shang people. In line with the creation of several new states, a program of rapid colonization was initiated by settling Zhou people and building new cities in the East in order to subjugate the hostile Dongyi and Huaiyi. As result, the Rebellion of the Three Guards began the military conflict between the Zhou dynasty and the independent tribes and states of the East, which would last until the fall of the Western Zhou in 771 BC.

The Duke of Zhou also recognized that the kingdom was too large to be ruled from the western court at Fenghao, so that he decided that "the construction of an eastern administrative center seemed inevitable if [the Zhou kings] were to maintain their rule in the east". The second capital (Chengzhou/Wangcheng) was located near Luoyang, though it is still unclear if a single or two cities were built.

=== Political impact ===
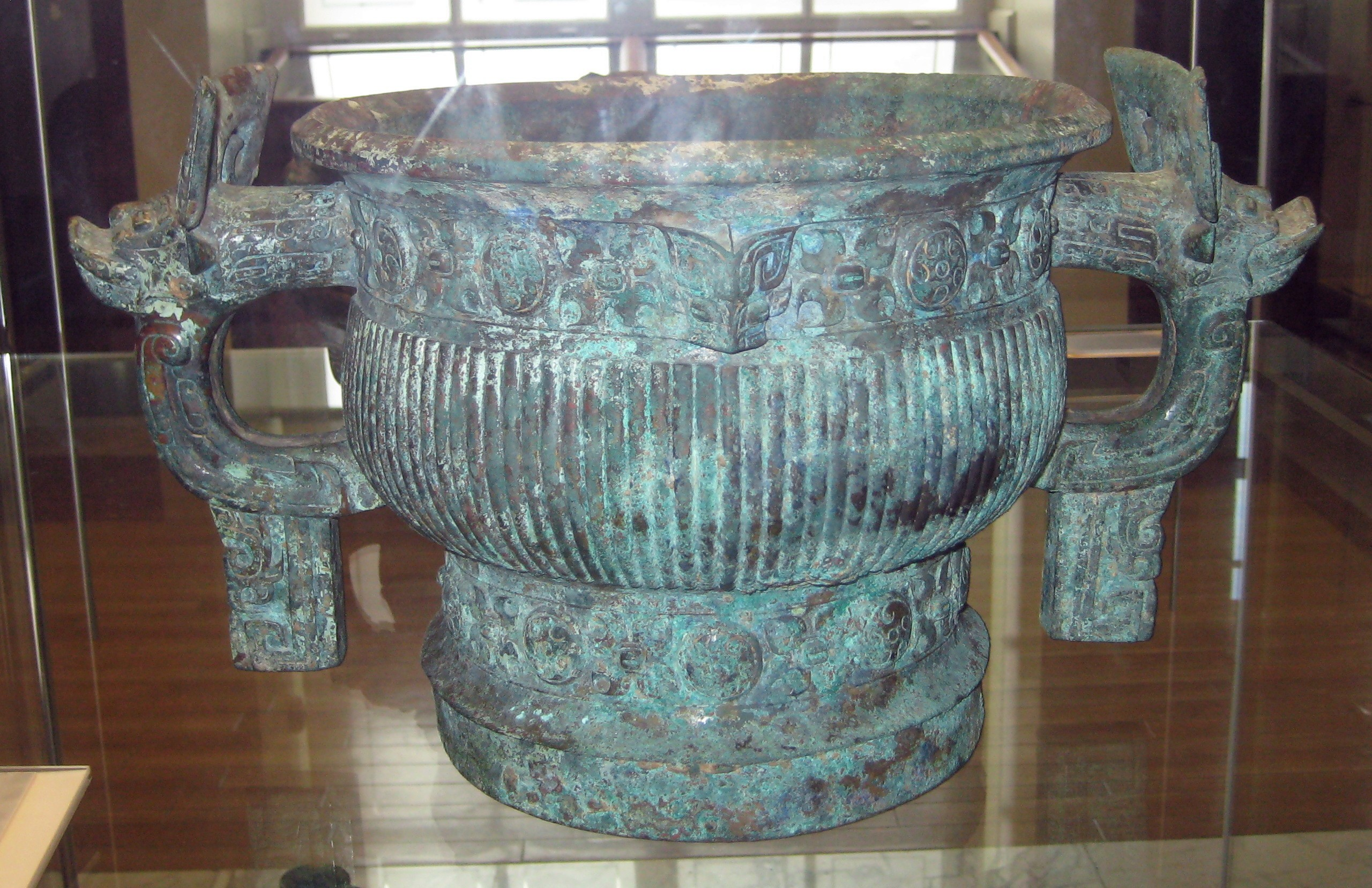
The Kang Hou gui (康侯簋), made after subduing the rebellion.

The land redistribution, government reform, and colonization program strengthened and stabilized the Zhou government, while the Duke of Zhou expounded the Mandate of Heaven in response to the rebellion. As a propaganda tool, the Mandate was used to legitimize the new dynasty morally and spiritually. Greatly empowered, the Zhou dynasty entered an era of prosperity and expansion that lasted until it was severely weakened by the war with Chu 961–957 BC. The triumvirate of Duke Dan of Zhou, King Cheng, and Duke Shi of Shao continued to rule the Zhou kingdom for three more years after the civil war. Eventually, however, Dan and his half-brother Shi fell out about the right form of government. Duke Dan, his own position as royal chancellor and regent in mind, opted for a meritocracy, while Duke Shi believed that the power should remain with the royal family to prevent usurpation. Possibly as result of this debate, the Duke of Zhou finally retired from court politics in 1036 BC, returning the official power to King Cheng and leaving the Duke of Shao as the most powerful man in the kingdom.

At the same time, the failure of Wu Geng's rebellion and the following dismantlement of the Shang state ended any realistic chances for the Shang dynasty's restoration. Despite this and the proclamation of the Mandate of Heaven which delegitimized the Shang rule, militant Shang loyalism and resistance against the Zhou regime persisted well after the Rebellion of the Three Guards. Around 979 BC, sixty years after the rebellion, war broke out between the Zhou kingdom under King Kang, Chang's successor, and the Guifang of Shanxi and northern Shaanxi. The latter were reportedly supported by Shang diehards under the Earl of Ge, and possibly fought for the restoration of the Shang dynasty. Nevertheless, such uprisings remained local and weak, so that Shang loyalism never again posed a serious threat to the Zhou dynasty.

=== Later reception of the rebellion ===
As the Duke of Zhou was later "revered as paragon of wisdom and humility" and respected as "great example" by Confucius, the revolt against his regency was consequently vilified. The Three Guards were considered as "evil men of old", over whom Duke Dan's virtue had triumphed. This interpretation dominated moralistic renditions of the civil war for centuries. Despite the generally negative view towards the rebels, there have been scholars who attempted a reassessment of the Three Guards. Ji Kang, a famous author of the Three Kingdoms period, wrote an essay about Guanshu and Caishu, in which he argued that the rebellious brothers had "sincere reasons to doubt the wisdom" of Duke Dan's regency. As a Cao loyalist he linked the Rebellion of the Three Guards with the Three Rebellions in Shouchun, regarding the rebels as dutiful men fighting against usurping regents (the Duke of Zhou and Sima Yi, respectively).

The eastern campaign launched by the Duke of Zhou is paid homage by the poem Po Fu (破斧) in the Classic of Poetry. It discusses the Zhou state's reforming of Guan, Cai, Yin, and Yan, that quashed the rebellion and wrestled them back under Zhou influence.

== See also ==
- Kang Hou gui, a Western Zhou bronze vessel whose inscription records the rebellion
- List of rebellions in China

== Bibliography ==
- Shaughnessy, Edward L. (1999). "Western Zhou History". In Michael Loewe; Edward L. Shaughnessy (eds.). The Cambridge History of Ancient China - From the Origins of Civilization to 221 B.C. Cambridge: Cambridge University Press. pp. 292–351. ISBN 9780521470308.
- Shaughnessy, Edward L. (1997). Before Confucius: Studies in the Creation of the Chinese Classics. New York City: State University of New York Press. ISBN 0-7914-3377-3.
- Hucker, Charles O. (1978), China to 1850: A short history, Stanford University Press, ISBN 0-8047-0958-0
- Li, Feng (2014) [1st pub. 2013]. Early China: A Social and Cultural History (Reprint with corrections ed.). Cambridge: Cambridge University Press. ISBN 978-0-521-71981-0.
- Li, Feng (2006). Axel Menges (ed.). Landscape and Power in Early China: The Crisis and Fall of the Western Zhou 1045-771 BC. Cambridge: Cambridge University Press. ISBN 978-0-521-85272-2.
- Chinn, Annping (2007), The Authentic Confucius, Scribner, ISBN 978-0-7432-4618-7
- Wu, Minna (2013). On the Periphery of a Great "Empire": Secondary Formation of States and Their Material Basis in the Shandong Peninsula during the Late Bronze Age, ca. 1000-500 B.C.E. New York City: Columbia University Academic Commons.
- Fang, Hui (2013). "The Eastern Territories of the Shang and Western Zhou: Military Expansion and Cultural Assimilation". In Anne P. Underhill (ed.). A Companion to Chinese Archaeology. Hoboken, New Jersey: Wiley-Blackwell. pp. 292–351. ISBN 978-1-4443-3529-3.
- Declercq, Dominik (1998). Writing Against the State: Political Rhetorics in Third and Fourth Century China. Leiden: Brill Publishers. ISBN 90-04-10376-7.
- Murowchick, Robert E.; Cohen, David J. (2001). "Searching for Shang's Beginnings: Great City Shang, City Song, and Collaborative Archaeology in Shangqui, Henan" (PDF). The Review of Archaeology. 22 (2). Williamstown, Massachusetts: The Review of Archaeology, Inc.: 47–61.
- Whiting, Marvin C. (2002). Imperial Chinese Military History: 8000 BC-1912 AD. Lincoln: iUniverse. ISBN 0-595-22134-3.
- Tan, Koon San (2014). Dynastic China: An Elementary History. Petaling Jaya: The Other Press Sdn. Bhd.
- Allan, Sarah (2007). "On the identity of Shang Di 上帝 and the origin of the concept of a Celestial Mandate (Tian Ming 天命)". Early China. 31. Cambridge: Cambridge University Press: 1–46. doi:10.1017/S0362502800001796. JSTOR 23354211. S2CID 159662391.
- Pankenier, David W. (1995). "The cosmo-political background of Heaven's Mandate". Early China. 20. Cambridge: Cambridge University Press: 121–176. doi:10.1017/S0362502800004466. JSTOR 23351765. S2CID 157710102.
- Khayutina, Maria (2015). "King Wen, a Settler of Disputes or Judge? The "Yu–Rui case" in the Historical Records and its Historical Background". Bochum Yearbook of East Asian Studies. 38. München: Ruhr-Universität Bochum: 261–276.
- Milburn, Olivia (2016). "The Xinian: an ancient historical text from the Qinghua University collection of bamboo books". Early China. 39. Cambridge: Cambridge University Press: 53–109. doi:10.1017/eac.2016.2. JSTOR 44075753. S2CID 232154371.
