= Duke of Shao =

Ruler of Shao and minister of the Zhou

Duke Shi of Shao 召公奭
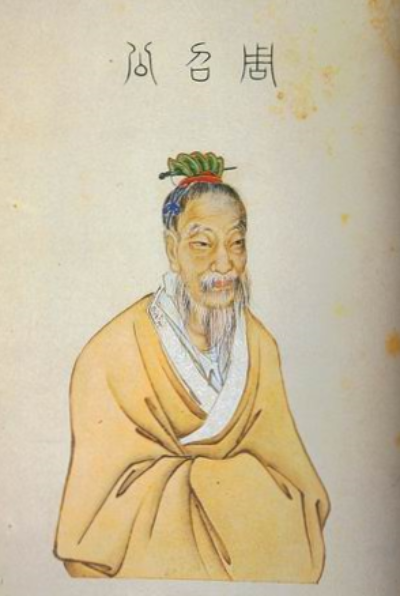
- Qing dynasty illustration, featuring Duke Shao's name in small seal script.

Duke of Shao
- Reign: c. 1120 BCE - c. 1000 BCE
- Predecessor: Position established
- Successor: Shao Zhong (召仲)

Duke of Northern Yan
- Reign: c. 1037 BCE - c. 1000 BCE
- Predecessor: ?
- Successor: Marquis Ke of Yan (燕侯克)
Names
- Family name: Ji (姬); Given name: Shi (奭); Clan name: Zhou (周)
Posthumous name
- Duke Kang of Zhou (召康公)

Chinese name
- Chinese: 召公奭
Transcriptions
Standard Mandarin
- Hanyu Pinyin: Shào Gōng Shì

Ji Shi
- Chinese: 姬奭
Transcriptions
Standard Mandarin
- Hanyu Pinyin: Jī Shì

Duke Kang of Shao
- Chinese: 召康公
Transcriptions
Standard Mandarin
- Hanyu Pinyin: Shào Kāng Gōng

Grand Protector Shi
- Chinese: 太保奭
Transcriptions
Standard Mandarin
- Hanyu Pinyin: Tài Bǎo Shì

Lord of Shao
- Chinese: 召公
Transcriptions
Standard Mandarin
- Hanyu Pinyin: Shào Gōng

Shi, Duke of Shao (died c. 1000 BCE), born Ji Shi, posthumous name Kang (康), also known as Lord Shao or Duke of Shao, (Note: also known as Duke Kang of Shao, Grand Protector Shi, and Lord Kang of Yan) was a high-ranking minister of the early Zhou dynasty. He was a member of the royal clan, the founding lineage head of the state of Yan, and elder of the minor polity Shao (召國). After King Wu of Zhou's death, Lord Shao supported the Duke of Zhou in his regency and helped suppress the Rebellion of the Three Guards. He remained a major figure at court for decades.

== Royal kin ==
The earliest biography of Lord Shao, in Sima Qian's Records of the Grand Historian, states merely that he was a member of same ancestral temple kinship group as the house of Zhou. Wang Chong's Lunheng calls him the elder brother of the Duke of Zhou. Huangfu Mi states Lord Shao was the son of King Wen of Zhou by a concubine. Modern scholarship has not significantly modified this view. Edward Shaughnessy called Lord Shao half-brother to the Duke of Zhou in a 1989 paper. Maria Khayutina, writing in 2015, reads the Gu Ming (顧命) chapter of the Shangshu as ordering the lineages who visit the ailing King Cheng of Zhou by their seniority rank within the Ji ancestral temple. With Shao in the first position, prior to the lineages founded by the sons of King Wen she reasons this lineage was founded earlier.

== Early career ==
For his role in the Zhou conquest of Shang, King Wu created Lord Shao the regional lord of Yan, but he never went to his lands, sending a son to mind them in his stead. Lord Shao was also appointed as the Grand Protector (太保), one of the Three Excellencies, the highest ministerial positions in the capital. The Duke of Zhou was another. Oracle bone and bronzeware study has revealed that Yan existed as a state prior to the mass enfeoffment of King Wu's family members and allies, implying that Duke Shi was installed in a manner similar to Shu Chu of Huo.

Two years after the conquest, before Zhou power had been completely consolidated, King Wu was dead. His son was considered too young to be fit to rule, and the Duke of Zhou unilaterally took power. The preceding Shang dynasty had handled succession by distributed agnatic seniority, a pattern which followed would have put the Duke of Zhou next in line for the throne. An illegally excavated manuscript version of a chapter of Shangshu, part of the Tsinghua bamboo slips, allows for the reading that the Duke of Zhou had performed a sacrifice to the ancestral spirits to divine whether he was their chosen successor to the ailing King Wu. The traditional reading interprets this passage to indicate the Duke of Zhou offering his life if the king's could be spared. In both readings, this ceremony is suggested by the other two Ducal Ministers.

Traditionally, the Duke of Zhou is considered to have assumed regency rather than kingship. In any case, the son of the vanquished Shang king and affiliated groups, possibly aided by Zhou royal brothers, (Note: All transmitted sources charge the brothers of King Wu who had been appointed to govern the Shang remnants with joining the rebellion. The excavated text Xinian states that the Zhou governors were killed by the rebel forces, but does not provide their identities.) took the opportunity to rebel in an action called the Rebellion of the Three Guards. Lord Shao allied with the Duke of Zhou, and after three years the rebellion was suppressed.

== Sharing power ==
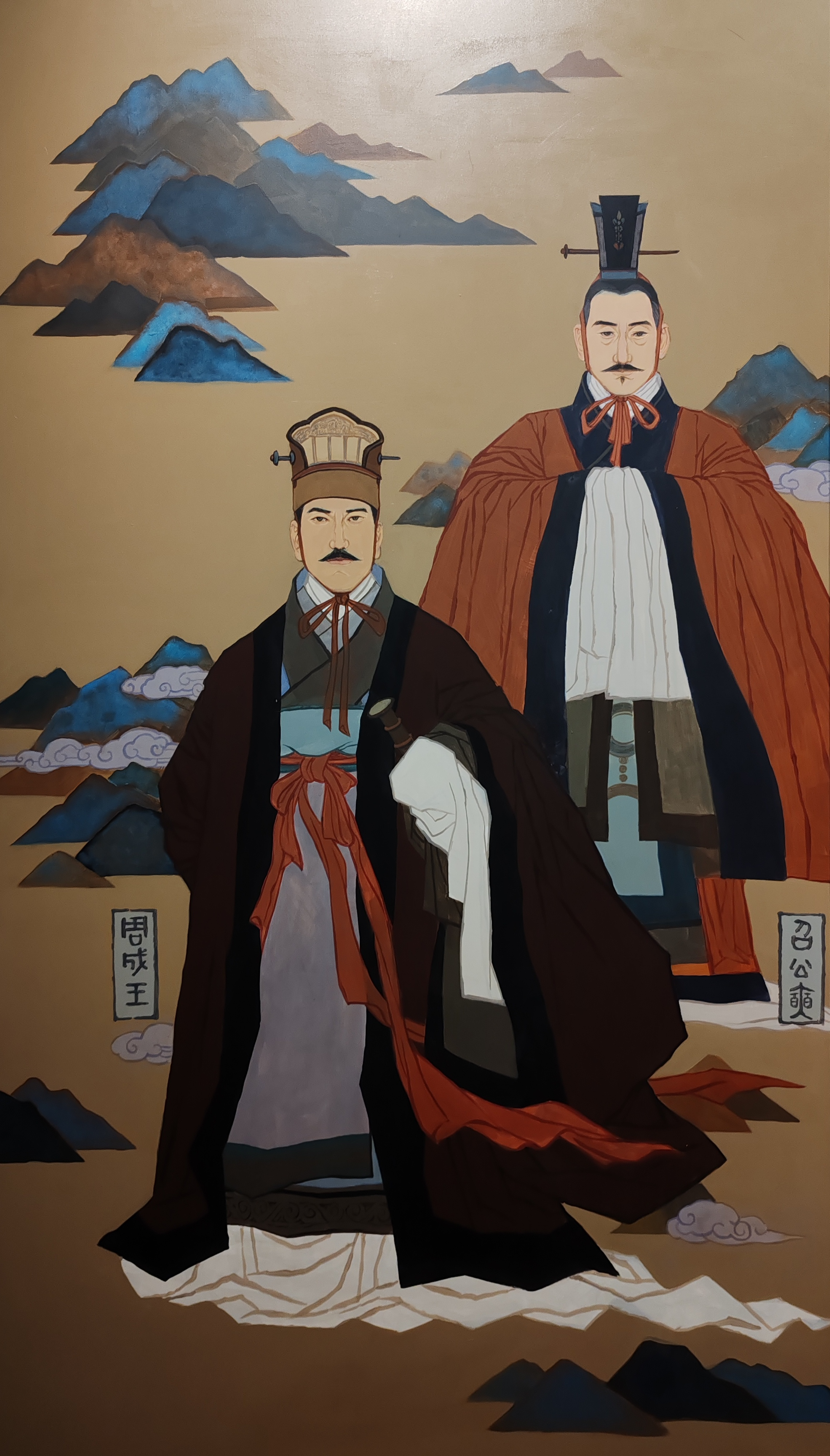
Duke of Shao (right) was assigned to Yan by King Cheng of Zhou (left)

With the violence quelled, King Wu's son, now three years less young, along with the victorious Lord Shao and Duke of Zhou, entered into a triple alliance, sharing power delicately between them. Lord Shao was given power over the lands to the west of the twin capitals Feng and Hao, on the Wei river in present-day Xi'an, Shaanxi. This included his lineage's power base near the predynastic Zhou capital of Xishan; the Duke of Zhou was given control over the lands to the east. It was during this timeframe Lord Shao went to survey the site of the new capital city Luoyi (present day Luoyang, Henan), which would control both the strategic ford which had facilitated the Zhou conquest in the first place, as well as the pass through the mountains to the Zhou homeland. The portents were also auspicious, and Lord Shao had rammed earth city wall constructed in a month's time.

Multiple episodes carried by the Shangshu relate to this period of time, and two in particular relate to each other and the power struggle at court. Jun Shi (君奭), a piece of persuasive writing from the Duke of Zhou to Lord Shao is one, and the other is Shao Gao (召誥), mostly by Lord Shao.

The language is archaic, and admits multiple readings. The traditional reading takes into account a cryptic statement that Lord Shao was unhappy at court to read Jun Shi as a plea from Lord Shao to remain in his position and help coadminister government affairs until the new king is ready. Shao Gao is then read as an exhortation to the new king to do a good job.

An alternative reading pits the two chapters against one another, with Lord Shao highlighting how the Mandate of Heaven flows only to the eldest son, and the Duke of Zhou calling upon a panoply of worthy ministers of yore to support his platform of how crucial capable ministers are to good government, quoting Lord Shao's own words back at him about how the two of them would work together, asserting that heaven's mandate had come jointly to the Zhou as a group, and ending with an impassioned plea where he addresses Lord Shao as his brother. (Note: Shaughnessy's reading of the line in Jun Shi where the Duke of Zhou addresses Lord Shao as his brother rests on the assumption that the word "brother" as carried by the parallel passage in the Three Styles Stone Classic, inscribed in 241 ce, has been corrupted by scribal transmission error from its original form 兄 to 允 in the received literature. Gassmann posited in 2012 that during the time period the Jun Shi was set in, the word translated as "brother" could also have referred to any elder male member of same generation in the kin group, suggesting that "cousin" could be a plausible reading.)

Although the two texts are clearly closely related, which is the response to the other is debated. And whether they are read from a traditional or revisionist viewpoint, regardless of the personal, political, or philosophical motives behind either man's words, soon thereafter the young King Cheng stepped fully into his authority, and the Duke of Zhou disappeared from the political scene for the remainder of his life.

== Longevity ==
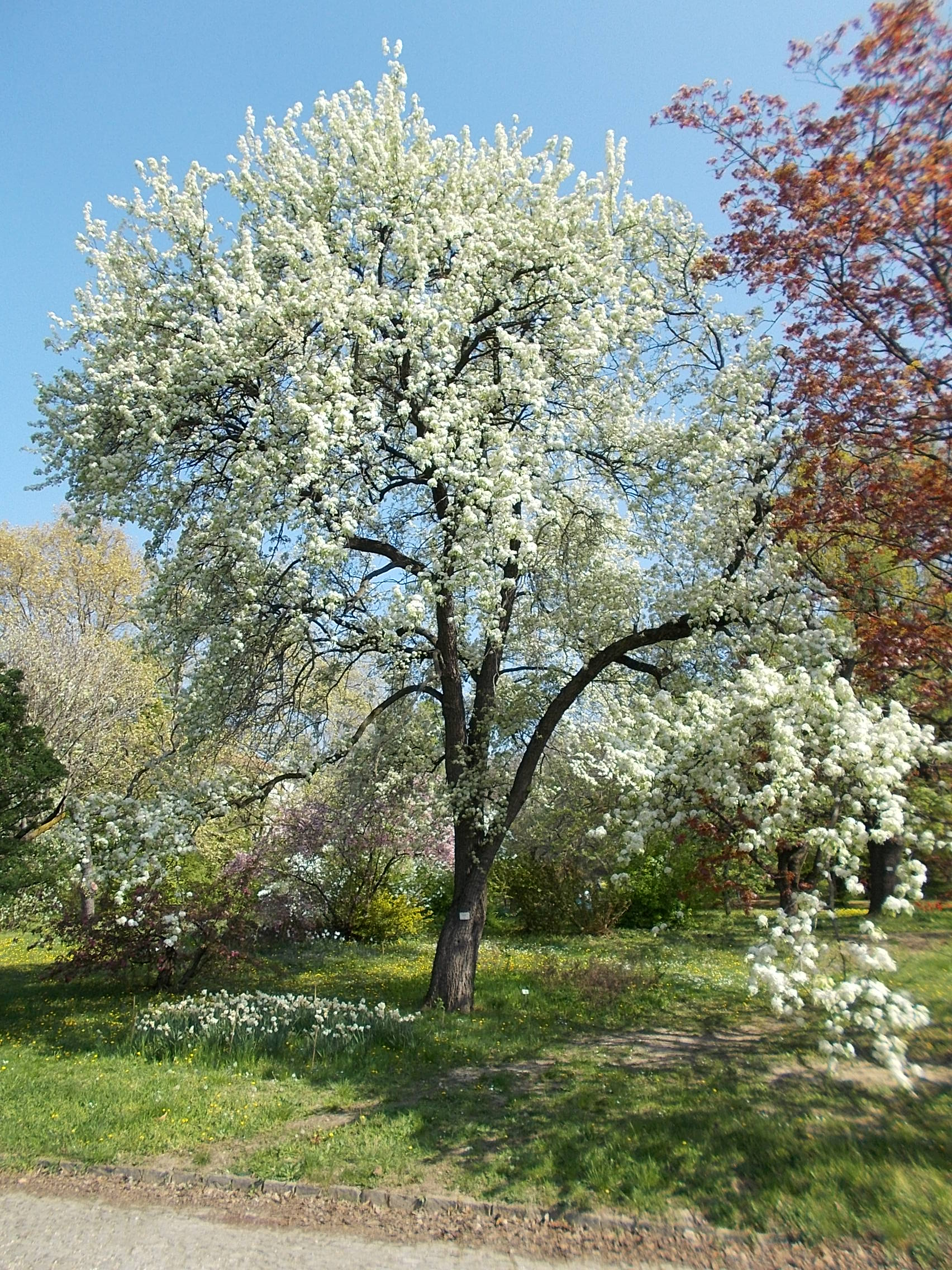
Birchleaf pear

Lord Shao served four generations of Zhou kings: King Wen, King Wu, King Cheng, and King Kang. He features prominently in the later Shangshu chapter Gu Ming, which describes the inauguration ritual of King Kang. In it, Lord Shao can be seen to command great respect at court. He is listed first in each enumeration of participants, gives orders to other functionaries to help prepare for the proceedings, performs ritual actions rivaled only by the new king and the Master Ritualist, and reads the command of accession to the king.

Wang Chong's Lunheng claims that Lord Shao lived over a hundred years, and epigraphic records securely dateable to the middle years of King Kang's reign tend to support rather than refute this claim.

The Classic of Poetry ode "The Sweet Pears" (甘棠) is said to have been composed in his honour. The poem says:

蔽芾甘棠，勿翦勿伐，召伯所茇。
The lush and flourishing sweet pear tree, do not trim it, do not cut it down—it was where Duke of Shao once camped.

蔽芾甘棠，勿翦勿敗，召伯所憇。
The lush and flourishing sweet pear tree, do not trim it, do not damage it—it was where Duke of Shao once rested.

蔽芾甘棠，勿翦勿拜，召伯所說。

The lush and flourishing sweet pear tree, do not trim it, do not bend it—it was where Duke of Shao once gave counsel.
