= History of Zhengzhou =

The history of Zhengzhou, a city that is today the provincial capital of Henan Province, China, spans over 10,000 years from its beginnings as a Neolithic settlement to its emergence as a trading port during the final years of the Qing dynasty.

== Antiquity to Western Zhou ==
Balls from the Lijiagou site (李家沟遗址) unearthed in Xinmi, Zhengzhou date to between 10,500 and 8,600 years ago and show evidence of stone tools from the early and late Neolithic periods at a time when the area's inhabitants made the transition between purely hunting for their livelihood to concurrently cultivating cereals. In Xinzheng, Zhengzhou, 8,000-year-old relics of Peiligang culture show that at the time local people raised livestock and engaged in the production of handicrafts as they expanded from their original base in the Yellow River Basin to develop the foundations of Chinese culture. The large scale Zhengzhou Dahecun Ruins (大河村遗址) provide a model example of Yangshao culture with many well preserved building foundations in a unique "Wood & Bone" (木骨整塑) architectural style that provide an important resource for research into ancient Chinese constructions methods.

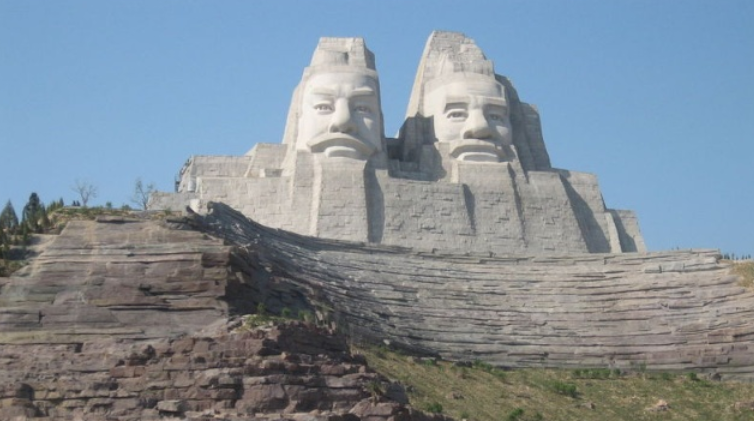
Zhengzhou Yellow River Scenic Area (郑州黄河风景名胜区) Twin Statues of the Emperors Yan and Huang

From the time that the legendary Five Emperors ruled China through the Xia dynasty to the advent of the Shang dynasty, Zhengzhou served as the axis of Chinese civilization. About 5,000 years ago, the primogenitor of the Chinese people, Xuanyuan (轩辕) later known as Yellow Emperor (Huangdi) was born at Xuanyuan's Mound (轩辕之丘). When Xuanyuan was 37 years old, he established his capital at Xinzheng while according to legend his 25 sons went on to found the Xia and Shang dynasties as well as providing leaders for the early Zhou dynasty.

The old ruins of Xishan (西山) marked a significant milestone in the development of Chinese architectural development, paving the way for large scale city wall construction and later developments in construction techniques.

Between 2070 BCE and 1600 BCE, Yu the Great, first leader of the Xia dynasty established his capital at Wanchenggang (王城岗) in Yancheng (now Dengfeng). Mount Song became the center of the Xia civilization based around the upper reaches of the Yi, Luo and Ying river basins as well as parts of southwest Shanxi Province.

From the time of Qi of Xia to King Tang of Shang the Shang Tribe migrated eight times then in 1675 BCE, King Tang invoked the mandate of heaven and attacked and overthrew the Xia capital at Fengqiu thereby destroying the Xia dynasty and paving the way for China's second feudal dynasty, the Shang with its capital at Xibo (西亳) in the Zhengzhou area.

Zhengzhou Shang City is a Shang dynasty site located in the city's Beiguan District. Based upon examination of the soil in the walls of the site, it was built around 1600 BCE at its very beginning.

Shang dynasty relics have been found both inside and outside Zhengzhou's double city wall. The inner wall is built in the form of a rectangle, while the outside wall is round to reflect these ancient people's circular cosmological view of the world. At the time, these walls exceeded the scale of those of the Middle East's Babylon and Assur as well as those of Mohenjo-daro in India, one of the ancient world's major urban settlements.

In 1046 BCE King Wu of Zhou defeated King Zhou of Shang and founded the Western Zhou dynasty with its capital at Chang'an (modern day Xi'an). He gave his younger brother Guan Shu (管叔) a fiefdom around Zhengzhou, which became the State of Guan. Other territories in the Zhengzhou area bestowed by King Wu included the states of Kuai (郐国/鄶國), Eastern Guo, Zhai (祭国/祭國) and Mi (密国/密國).

Following the destruction of Western Zhou in 770 BCE, Duke Wu of Zheng (郑武公) in alliance with the armies of the states of Qin, Jin and Wey beat back an attack by the nomadic Quanrong and as a reward received the office of qīngshì (卿士), becoming responsible for high level matters of state in Luoyang. Not long afterwards, Duke Wu escorted King Ping of Zhou when he moved his capital to Luoyang and was given territory around the Hulao Pass. Duke Wu established his capital at Xingyang and became the second ruler of the State of Zheng. Shortly afterwards, Duke Wu annexed the States of Kuai, Eastern Guo and Hu (胡国) then in 765 BCE he moved his capital back to its original location in the State of Kuai and to distinguish it from Zheng territory in Xihua County he called his Henan capital Xinzheng.

== Spring and Autumn period to the Northern and Southern dynasties ==
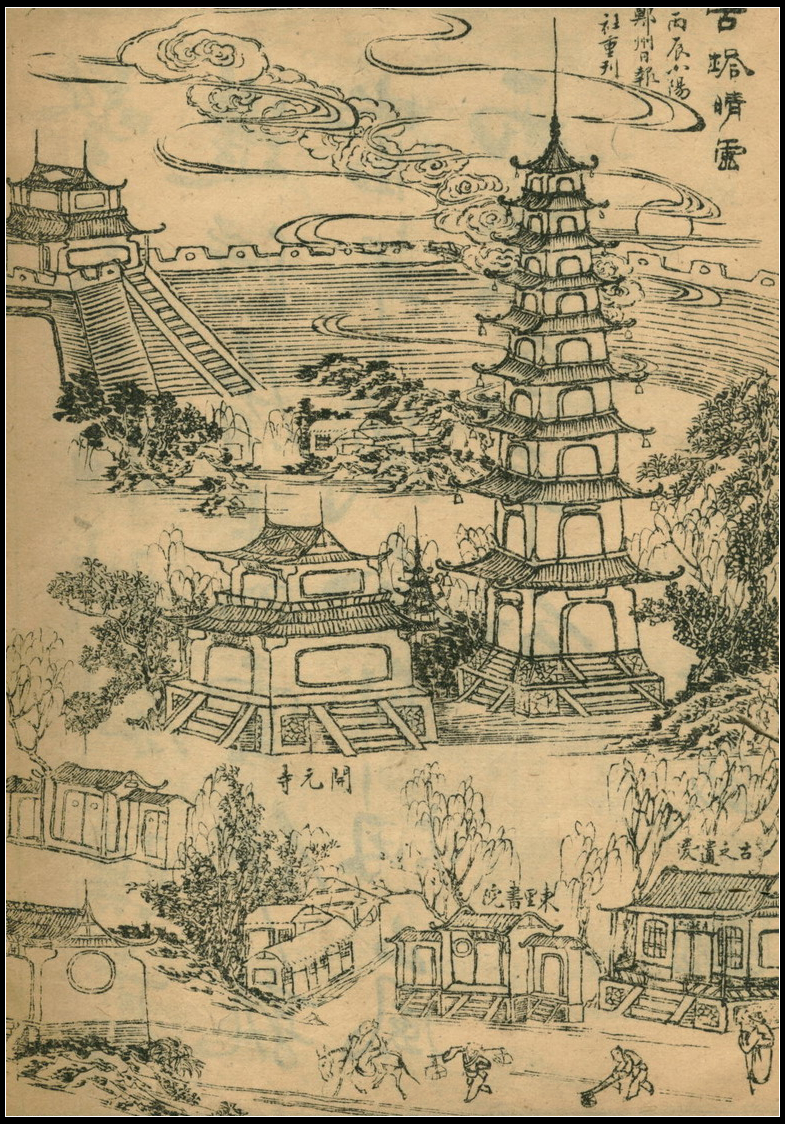
Qingyun Ancient Pagoda, Zhengzhou (古塔晴云)

The Spring and Autumn period saw the emergence of vassal states vying for hegemony and created a period of disorder. The State of Zheng survived through a combination of cooperation with other states, occasional confrontations, diplomacy and mutual acquisition of territory; circumstances that lasted until the Warring States period.

When statesman Zichan held office in the State of Zheng from about 544 BCE he resisted external incursions and cultivated the rule of law as well as implementing agricultural reforms to make Zheng a rich and powerful state once more. After he died, Zitai Shu (子太叔) took over whereupon Zheng's rulers mistakenly enforced strict policies that caused an outbreak of serious banditry.

In 375 BCE, the State of Han overthrew Zheng and moved its capital to Xinzheng. During 355 BCE reforms by Shang Yang in the State of Qin, Han became relatively weak compared to the other vassals but when Marquis Zhao of Han (韩昭侯) succeeded to the throne, he appointed former Zheng official Shen Buhai chancellor. Shen strengthened the Han army such that it became one of the Seven Warring States only to gradually decline towards the end of the Warring States period, leading to its King's capture by the Qin army in 230 BCE and the state's extermination. Xinzheng acted as capital city for both the Han and Zheng states throughout this 500-year period.

After they invaded, the Qin army made Han territory into a military commandery known as Sanchuan Commandery (Sānchuān Jùn 三川郡). When Qin Shihuang unified the remaining six warring states in 221 BCE he went on to create a total of thirty six commanderies with the Sanchuan Commandery as one of them and its magistrate's seat first at Luoyang, later moved to Xingyang. A large part of Zhengzhou fell within Sanchuan Commandery while Xinzheng was classified as part of Yingchuan Commandery (Yĭngchuān Jùn 颖川郡). In 208 BCE at the end of the Qin dynasty the Dazexiang uprising led by Chen Sheng and Wu Guang, broke out. Wu was killed by his own troops during their siege of Xingyang while Chen pressed on towards Xianyang in modern-day Shanxi to challenge the unified rule of the Qin Court but was eventually crushed. In 206 BCE Liu Bang stationed troops in Xingyang and fought Xiang Yu in the first battle of the Chu–Han Contention during which both sides fought repeatedly until after a stalemate of several months the parties agreed that the Hong Canal (鸿沟 Hóng Gōu) between the Yellow and Huai Rivers would form the boundary marking their respective territories. During this period, the area of modern Zhenghou was centered on Xingyang and because of its transportation links acted as an important economic hub.

During the Western Han period, relying on the rich resources of the Mount Dakui (隗山), Mount Yi (役山) and Mount Song region, Gongyi to the west of Zhengzhou and Xingyang both became important national iron smelting centers. Xingyang established an Iron Bureau and many remnants of large scale Han dynasty iron smelting and pig iron production have been unearthed in the area, demonstrating that at that time the Han people had already reached the highest standards of metal casting. The Eastern Han period saw successive revolts and land seizures beginning with the Yellow Turban Rebellion in 184 CE. Cao Cao occupied the Central China Plain and in 200 CE defeated Yuan Shao at the Battle of Guandu, northeast of present-day Zhongmu County. After Emperor Hui of Jin ascended the throne in 290 CE, uprisings such as the War of the Eight Princes and the Disaster of Yongjia occurred frequently and continued until the time of the Later Zhao during the Sixteen Kingdoms period. Throughout this time, Zhengzhou witnessed unrest with a slump in agriculture and frequent crop failures. During the Northern Wei dynasty Indian Buddhist disciple Bodhidharma arrived and remained at the Shaolin Temple on Mount Song where stared at a wall for nine years and passed on the teachings of Buddha to the Chinese Chán disciple Dazu Huike.

== Sui dynasty to Qing dynasty ==
The first Sui emperor, Emperor Wen of Sui, established the two-tier zhōu and xiàn territorial administration system, renaming Xingzhou (荥州) Zhengzhou in 583 CE and thus establishing the official name of the city that still exists today. After Emperor Yang of Sui improved both the Grand Canal and its western extension, the Tongji Canal (通济渠), for a time Zhengzhou became an important national hub for both land- and water-borne commerce. In 618 CE Sui general Yuwen Huaji killed Emperor Yang of Sui marking the end of the Sui dynasty. Thereafter, Yang Tong seized his opportunity and set himself up as emperor in Luoyang. A year later General Wang Shichong nullified Yang's appointment and reestablished the State of Zheng, the third iteration of the name in Chinese history. In 621, Li Shimin (later Emperor Taizong of Tang) led three thousand armored horsemen to face Dou Jiande's 100,000 strong army at the Battle of Hulao. Dou lost and Wang Shichong immediately surrendered Luoyang.

During the Tang dynasty in 680 CE, Emperor Gaozong of Tang took his consort Wu Zetian on a tour of Mount Song. Wu again visited in 696 CE during her time as empress regnant to present gifts to the Shaolin monks. As this was her Wànsuì dēngfēng (万岁登峰/萬歲登封) regnal year, in commemoration she renamed Songyang County (嵩阳县) Dengfeng. After the An Lushan Rebellion in the mid-eighth century, production in the Yellow River basin virtually ceased with miles and miles of the central plain lain waste. The Northern Song dynasty established their capital at Biànjīng (汴京) [modern day Kaifeng] in 1105 CE whereupon Zhengzhou became one of the four imperial auxiliary capitals and was known as Xifu (西辅). From the beginning the Northern Song dynasty, education came into vogue and many Confucian academies sprang up across the country. At that time in Dengfeng, the Songyang Academy (嵩阳书院) below Junji Ridge (峻极峰) was one of the largest in China. Economic stagnation set in during the Jin dynasty with the only developments occurring in astronomy when Guo Shoujing and Wang Xun (王恂) set up a network of 27 astronomical observatories across China with Dengfeng at the center.

After the founding of the Ming dynasty in 1368 CE, the Central China Plain became desolate and overgrown. In succession, migrants arrived from Zhejiang and Shanxi Provinces crowding both Xingyang and Zhongmu with new residents. Insurrection broke out in all parts of China at the end of the Ming dynasty and in 1635 during the reign of the Chongzhen Emperor, Li Zicheng's rebel peasant army occupied areas including Sishui (汜水) and Xingyang County, finally marching on Guangwushan (广武山). The rebels broke through the Ming army, surrounded and annihilated them then more than 200,000 of the peasants assembled to discuss strategy at the "Xingyang Gathering" (荥阳聚会). Following the 40 years of chaos at the end of the Ming dynasty the dykes along the Yellow River were in disarray, with many stretches breached. This had a serious impact on water transport and in June 1662, during the reign of the Qing dynasty Kangxi Emperor, the Yellow River overflowed flooding Zhongmu to the west, south and north. As a result, in 1683 Kangxi ordered the dykes to be rebuilt 40 feet high and 10 feet wide. In the final years of the Qing dynasty the Pinghan (平汉) and Longhai Railways intersected at Zhengzhou, making the city the link in the main national north–south and east–west transport network. The economic situation continually improved making the city an important agricultural by-product distribution center and a small-scale port for the importation of manufactured goods.

== Republic of China and PRC era ==
After the foundation of the Republic of China, in 1913 Zhengzhou changed from being a territory directly administered from the capital, (直隶州zhílìzhōu), to Zhengzhou County (郑州县). In 1920 the Henan Provincial Legislature proposed the set-up of a trading port in the city then in February 1923 the Jinguan Railway came to a halt during the communist-led "27 Major Strike" (二七大罢工), which originated in Zhengzhou but was quickly resolved. In March the same year, the State Affairs Conference of the Beiyang Government officially approved the creation of a trading port at Zhengzhou and established a government commercial office to run it. By 1927, the newly founded "Travel Magazine" (旅行杂志) published in Shanghai, was already describing Zhengzhou as a 'major northern Chinese metropolis'. Zhengzhou was elevated to city status by warlord Feng Yuxiang in 1928, then in 1931, following the military confrontation between Chiang Kai-shek, Yan Xishan and Feng during the Central Plains War, Zhengzhou once more became a county. During the Second Sino-Japanese War, on June 9, 1938, to stop the westward advance of the Japanese Army along the Longhai Railway, Nationalist KMT troops blew up the dikes along the south bank of the Yellow River at Huayuankou (花园口) causing the 1938 Yellow River flood. The Nationalist Government set up an official Zhengzhou Appeasement Office (郑州绥靖公署) (a regional military headquarters) in January 1946 at the Luzu Temple (吕祖庙) then in October 1948 the People's Liberation Army attacked and occupied the city, taking over the Appeasement Office and thereby taking control from the Nationalists.

Zhengzhou became a city once more in 1953 then on October 30 the next year the provincial capital of Henan moved to the city from Kaifeng. According to official records, the reason for the move from Kaifeng was Zhengzhou's unrivalled position as a provincial traffic hub compared to other cities while its central position was more convenient for the management of the whole province as opposed to the eastern Kaifeng. On August 5, 1952, the decision to move the capital was official ratified by the Provincial People's Government.

With its elevation to provincial capital status, Zhengzhou also became one of 15 national cities to focus on construction. Industry developed rapidly encompassing spinning and weaving, coal mining, machinery production and 65 other backbone industries. Ten vocational colleges and a research institute were constructed at the same time as Zhengzhou commenced a city-wide building program. In 1997 the Chinese State Council officially approved Zhengzhou as one of three national trade and commerce pilot centers.

At the start of the 21st century Zhengzhou has successively received awards as "National Garden City", "Excellent Tourism City", "Optimal Conference and Exhibition City", "National Competitive City" and "National Cultural City" amongst others and has established itself as the core city and economic center of the Central China Plain.
