= Guan (state) =

Ancient Chinese city-state

Guan 管
- ca. 1046 BC–ca. 1039 BC
- Status: Vassal state
- Capital: Guancheng, Zhengzhou
- Government: Monarchy
- Ruler
- History
  - Established: ca. 1046 BC
  - Rebellion of the Three Guards: ca. 1039 BC

Guan (Chinese: 管; pinyin: Guǎn; c. 1046–1040 BC) was an ancient Chinese city-state in present-day Henan. Its capital was Guancheng or Guan City (管城) in present-day Guancheng Hui District of Zhengzhou and its power was limited to the immediate surrounding area.

Guan was established soon after the founding of the Zhou dynasty as an appanage for King Wu's younger brother, who was known as Shu Xian of Guan. The three brothers: Shu Xian, Shu Chu of Huo, and Shu Du of Cai were known as the Three Guards, for their territories' function protecting the Zhou homeland from east. Following the death of King Wu, however, the Three Guards and Wu Geng rebelled against the regency of the Duke of Zhou. The latter’s victory led to the dissolution of Guan.

== See also ==
- Three Guards Rebellion
