= Shu Chu of Huo =

Duke of Huo and one of the Three Guards

Duke of Huo Shu Chu of Huo
- 霍叔處
- Chu (處) in Bronze script.

Personal details
- Born: c. 11th Century BCE Predynastic Zhou
- Parents: King Wen of Zhou (father); Tai Si (mother)

Chinese name
- Traditional Chinese: 霍叔處
- Simplified Chinese: 霍叔处
Transcriptions
Standard Mandarin
- Hanyu Pinyin: huò shū chǔ
- Military career
- Allegiance: Yin
- Conflicts: Rebellion of the Three Guards

Shu Chu of Huo was a ruler of the State of Huo during the Western Zhou period. He is most known for his involvement in the Rebellion of the Three Guards, though to what extent is disputed.

== Early life ==
Shu Chu was one of ten children of Tai Si and King Wen of Zhou, the eighth, and thus a younger brother to King Wu of Zhou.

== Reign ==
After the Battle of Muye that brought down Di Xin, King Wu of Zhou stationed Shu Chu near Yin, the remains of the Shang dynasty. This was to monitor the Shang people, as well as Di Xin's heir, Wu Geng, to ensure that they do not rebel. Along with Shu Du of Cai and Shu Xian of Guan, these individuals would be known as the Three Guards (三公). Shu Chu would serve throughout the reign without incident.

When King Wu died, he left no successor old enough to take the throne. His eldest heir, Cheng, was around 7 years old. Ergo, Duke Dan of Zhou would take regency over Western Zhou and teach him the skills necessary to rule. However, this was controversial amongst the Zhou, with some believing that as the previous rulers of the region were the Shang, it would make sense for Wu Geng to take regency. This led to Wu Geng and the Three Guards to rebel against the regency of the Duke of Zhou in 1042 BCE, which would be defeated in the east four years later. Thereafter, Shu Chu was reduced to a commoner for three years, whilst Shu Xian would be executed in Yin and Shu Du would be imprisoned.

== Legacy ==
The state of Huo would continue for several centuries, eventually being destroyed by Duke Xian of Jin in 661 BC. His descendants would reside in Pingyang (平陽) as commoners thereafter.
