= Wu Geng =

Son of Di Xin, Shang dynasty

- 武庚
- Died: c. 1039 BC; Zhaoge, Western Zhou
- Other names: Family name: Zi (子); Given name: Wu Geng (武庚); Alternative name: Lu Fu (祿父)
- Occupations: Politician, prince
- Known for: Participation in the Rebellion of the Three Guards

Ruler of the Vassal State of Bei
- In office c. 1046 BCE – c. 1039 BCE
- Preceded by: Di Xin; Monarchy abolished
- Succeeded by: Weizi Qi; State of Song established

Chinese name
- Chinese: 武庚
Transcriptions
Standard Mandarin
- Hanyu Pinyin: wǔ gēng
Middle Chinese
- Middle Chinese: mjuX kaeng
Old Chinese
- Baxter–Sagart (2014): /*m(r)aʔ kˤraŋ/
- Zhengzhang: /*maʔ kraːŋ/
- Military career
- Allegiance: Yin
- Conflicts: Rebellion of the Three Guards †

Wu Geng or Wugeng (Chinese: 武庚 Wǔgēng), a.k.a. 祿父 Lùfù, was an ancient Chinese noble who was the son of Di Xin, the ruler of the Shang.

== Traditional historiography ==
After his father allegedly executed Bi Gan by cutting out his heart, Wu Geng fled to Feng, the capital of the Zhou state, together with his uncles Weizi Qi and Weizhong to plead King Wu of Zhou for support. However, despite the classics saying such, no evidence of Bi Gan's death has been uncovered in excavations.

Around c. 1046 BCE, on a jiazi (甲子) day, King Wu attacked the Shang and decisively defeated Di Xin at the Battle of Muye, thus establishing the Zhou dynasty. Oracle bone evidence suggests King Wu requested Wu Geng to come to Haojing after the conquest of Shang.

=== Reign ===
Wu Geng was allowed to stay in Yin, the old Shang capital, which was split between three vassal states. These were Bei—which Wu Geng governed—Yong (庸), and Wei. Wu Geng would serve as a princedom and vassal lord to King Wu. He was said to have administered in a similar way to Pan Geng, to which the Shang people rejoiced. During this period, King Wu enfeoffed three relatives; Shu Xian of Guan, Shu Du of Cai, and Shu Chu of Huo, the "Three Guards" (三監); in areas close to Yin, so to weaken the late Shang state's power and cut them off from access to military support from the Dongyi states.

=== Rebellion of the Five Guards ===
After King Wu's death and the ascension of his young son King Cheng, Wu Geng joined the failed Rebellion of the Three Guards against the regent Duke of Zhou, who had taken power from the young ruler. Wu Geng believed that the Duke of Zhou was attempting to usurp the new king, and that if anyone were to serve as regent for this period, it should be him. Wu Geng was in turn joined by the Dongyi states and the Three Guards who were meant to oversee him. The rebellion was defeated in three years by the Duke of Zhou, who personally led the Zhou army.

== In popular culture ==
Wu Geng's life after the fall of Shang was fictionalized in manhuas titled Feng Shen Ji (封神記) and Feng Shen Ji II. The former manhua focuses on Wu Geng's battle against the gods who supported Zhou, using the body of a slave he humiliated and blinded, when his mother extracted his soul out to fake his death. The latter covers further fighting against gods. An animated adaptation entitled Wu Geng Ji (武庚纪) started airing in 2016.
