= Fengjian =

Political ideology during the latter part of the Zhou dynasty

- Chinese: 封建
- Literal meaning: demarcation and establishment
Transcriptions
Standard Mandarin
- Hanyu Pinyin: fēngjiàn
- Wade–Giles: fêng-chien
Yue: Cantonese
- Jyutping: fung1 gin3
Southern Min
- Hokkien POJ: hong kiàn

Fengjian, literally "demarcation and establishment" but often (controversially) described as Chinese feudalism, was a governance system and political thought in Ancient China and Imperial China, whose social structure formed a decentralized system of confederation-like government. The ruling class consisted of the Son of Heaven (king or emperor) and aristocracy, and the lower class consisted of commoners categorized into four occupations (or "four categories of the people", namely scholar-officials, peasants, laborers and merchants). Elite bonds through affinal relations and submission to the overlordship of the king date back to the Shang dynasty, but it was the Western Zhou dynasty who granted land to their clan relatives and fellow warriors in return for continued political loyalty. Through the fengjian system, the king would allocate an area of land to a noble, establishing him as the ruler of that region and allowing his title and domain to be legitimately inherited by his descendants. This created large numbers of local autonomous dynastic domains.

== Development ==
The earliest description of fengjian was in the Classic of Poetry, which portrayed an image of prosperity, peace, and order:

At Heaven’s bidding they looked down;

The peoples below were awed,
There were no disorders, no excesses;
They dared not be idle or pause.
Heaven’s charge was upon the lands below (命於下國; ming yu xiaguo),

Firmly were their blessings planted and established (封建厥福; fengjian juefu).

The rulers of these vassal states, known as zhūhóu (諸侯; 'many lords'), had a political obligation of fealty to the king, but as the central authority started to decline during the Eastern Zhou dynasty, their power began to outstrip that of the royal house and subsequently the states developed into their own kingdoms, reducing the Zhou dynasty to little more than a prestigious name. As a result, Chinese history from the Zhou dynasty (1046–256 BC) to the beginning of the Qin dynasty has been termed a "feudal" period by many Chinese historians, due to the custom of enfeoffment of land similar to that which was alleged by many scholars to have existed in Medieval Europe. However, scholars have suggested that fengjian otherwise lacks some of the fundamental aspects of the so-called 'feudalism' (for the debate concerning whether any one such system existed in Europe in the first place and if there existed any 'fundamental' traits it was supposed to have, see Susan B. Reynolds).

Each fengjian state was autonomous and had its own tax and legal systems along with its own unique currency and even writing style. The nobles were required to pay regular homage to the king and to provide him with soldiers in a time of war. This structure played an important part in the political structure of the Western Zhou which was expanding its territories in the east. In due course this resulted in the increasing power of the noble lords, whose strength eventually exceeded that of the Zhou kings, leading to dwindling central authority. The vassal states started to ignore the orders of the Zhou court and fight with each other for land, wealth and influence, which eventually disintegrated the authority of the Eastern Zhou into the chaos and violence of the Warring States period, where the great lords ended up proclaiming themselves as kings.

During the pre-Qin period, fengjian represented the Zhou dynasty's political system, and various thinkers, such as Confucius, looked to this system as a concrete ideal of political organization. In particular, according to Confucius, during the Spring and Autumn period the traditional system of rituals and music had become empty and hence his goal was to return to or bring back the early Zhou dynasty political system. With the establishment of the Qin dynasty in 221 BCE, the First Emperor unified the country and abolished the fengjian system, consolidating a new system of administrative divisions called the junxian system (郡縣制, "commandery-county system") or prefectural system, with the establishment of thirty-six prefectures and a rotational system for appointing local officials. There are many differences between the two systems, but one is particularly worth mentioning: the prefectural system gave more power to the central government, since it consolidated power at the political center or the top of the empire's political hierarchy. Tradition narrates that the Burning of books and burying of scholars was a result of Confucian scholars promoting the revival of the fengjian system. From the Qin dynasty onward, Chinese literati would find a tension between the Confucian ideal of fengjian and the reality of the centralized imperial system.

After the establishment of the Han dynasty, Confucianism became the reigning imperial ideology and scholars and court officials alike again began to look to the Zhou dynasty fengjian system as an ideal. These scholars advocated incorporating elements of the fengjian system into the junxian system. The Han dynasty emperors ultimately chose to parcel out land to their relatives and several other powerful officials, thus combining the junxian and fengjian systems. The turning point came at the Rebellion of the Seven States, following which the autonomy of the fiefs was curbed and the fiefs were eventually abolished altogether. Subsequent dynasties also partially implemented the fengjian system alongside regular administration in other regions of the empire.

From the Tang dynasty to the Southern Song dynasty, including the Liao dynasty and the Jin dynasty, nobles were granted titles but held no fiefs.

The fengjian system was again revived in the Yuan dynasty when dynastic fiefs were once again established at various parts of the empire. This remained the same throughout the Ming dynasty and the Qing dynasty, albeit the number of fiefs in the Qing dynasty was drastically reduced.

== Four occupations ==
The four occupations were the shì (士) the class of "knightly" scholars, mostly from lower aristocratic orders, the gōng (工) who were the artisans and craftsmen of the kingdom and who, like the farmers, produced essential goods needed by themselves and the rest of society, the nóng (農) who were the peasant farmers who cultivated the land which provided the essential food for the people and tributes to the king, and the shāng (商) who were the merchants and traders of the kingdom.

Zōngfǎ (宗法; "Clan Law"), which applied to all social classes, governed the primogeniture of rank and succession of other siblings. The eldest son of the consort would inherit the title and retained the same rank within the system. Other sons from the consort, concubines, and mistresses would be given titles one rank lower than their father. As time went by, all of these terms lost their original meanings, yet Zhūhóu (諸侯), Dafu (大夫), and Shi (士) became synonyms for court officials.

The four occupations under the fengjian system differed from those of European feudalism in that people were not born into the specific classes, such that, for example, a son born to a gōng craftsman was able to become a part of the shāng merchant class, and so on.

Beginning in the Han dynasty, the sizes of troops and domains a male noble could command would be determined by his rank of peerage, which from highest to lowest were:

1. gōng 公
2. hóu 侯
3. bó 伯
4. zǐ 子
5. nán 男

While before the Han dynasty an aristocrat with a place name in his title actually governed that place, it was only nominally true afterwards. Any male member of the nobility could be called a gōng zǐ (公子), while any son of a king could be called a wáng zǐ (王子; 'prince').

== Well-&-field system ==
The brown border between the farms resembles the character for well (井).

The well-&-field system (Chinese: 井田制度; pinyin: jǐngtián zhìdù) was a land distribution method existing in some parts of China between the ninth century BC (late Western Zhou dynasty) to around the end of the Warring States period. Its name comes from Chinese character 井 (jǐng), which means 'well' and looks like the # symbol; this character represents the theoretical appearance of land division: a square area of land was divided into nine identically sized sections; the eight outer sections (私田; sītián) were privately cultivated by peasants and the center section (公田; gōngtián) was communally cultivated on behalf of the landowning aristocrat.

While all fields were aristocrat-owned, the private fields were managed exclusively by individual families and the produce was entirely the farmers'. It was only produce from the communal fields, worked on by all eight families, that went to the aristocrats, and which, in turn, could go to the king as tribute.

As part of a larger fengjian system, the well-&-field system became strained in the Spring and Autumn period as kinship ties between aristocrats became meaningless. When the system became economically untenable in the Warring States period, it was replaced by a system of private land ownership. It was first suspended in the state of Qin by Shang Yang and the other Chinese states soon followed suit.

As part of the "turning the clock back" reformations by Wang Mang during the short-lived Xin dynasty, the system was restored temporarily and renamed to the King's Fields (王田; wángtián). The practice was more-or-less ended by the Song dynasty, but scholars like Zhang Zai and Su Xun were enthusiastic about its restoration and spoke of it in a perhaps oversimplifying admiration, invoking Mencius's frequent praise of the system.

== "Feudalism" and Chinese Marxism ==
Marxist historians in China have described medieval Chinese society as largely feudal. The fengjian system is particularly important to Marxist historiographical interpretation of Chinese history in China, from a slave society to a feudal society. The first to propose the use of this term for Chinese society was the Marxist historian and one of the leading writers of 20th-century China, Guo Moruo in the 1930s. Guo Moruo's views dominated the official interpretation of historical records, according to which the political system during the late Zhou dynasty saw the gradual transformation of society from slave society into feudal society. It is argued that during the Warring States Period, society had started to develop institutions comparable to the feudalistic system in medieval Europe. Adhering to Marx's theory of historical materialism, Guo argues that models of society progress under the impact of technological advancements. For example, with the discovery of bronze and the emergence of bronze tools, society progressed from primitive communism into slave society. Similarly, with the introduction of iron metallurgy around the 5th century BCE, Chinese society gradually saw the centralisation of authority, the emergence of total war, and the departing from slavery as society's primary mode of production. Guo therefore argues that with the unification of China under the first emperor Qin Shi Huang, China officially progressed into feudal or fengjian society. With Guo's work however, fengjian no longer referred to the classical system of 'demarcation and establishment' but was equated with the western historical stage of feudalism. Certain historians have identified the "near-pseudohistorical" nature of Guo's assessment and argue that Guo's use of fengjian was an intentional misusage in order to deprecate decentralist societies in support of a centralized state.

=== Comparisons ===
Under the Zhou fengjian society, the delegation of authority was based on kinship and there was a single direction of obligation, whereas in the European model, the lord and vassal had clearly specified mutual obligations and duties. Medieval European feudalism realized the classic case of the 'noble lord' while, in the middle and latter phases of the Chinese fengjian society, the landlord system was instead to be found. In Europe, the feudal lordships were hereditary and irrevocable and were passed on from generation to generation, whereas the Zhou lordships were not always hereditary, required reappointment by the king, and could be revoked. The medieval serf was bound to the land and could not leave or dispose of it, whereas the Zhou peasant was free to leave or, beginning in the Eastern Han dynasty, to purchase the land in small parcels.

Moreover, in Europe, feudalism was also considered to be a hierarchical economic system in which the lords were at the top of the structure, followed by the vassals, and then the peasants who were legally bound to the land and were responsible for all production. In Zhou rule, the fengjian system was solely political and was not responsible for governing the economy.

Furthermore, according to China: A New History by John K. Fairbank and Merle Goldman, dissimilarities existed between the merchant class of the two systems as well. In feudal Europe, the merchant class saw a marked development in towns located away from the influence of the manors and their attached villages. The European towns could grow outside of the feudal system instead of being integrated into it since the landed aristocrats were settled in manors. Thus, the towns and their people were independent of the influence of the feudal lords and were usually solely under the political authority of the monarchs of the European kingdoms. In China, these conditions were non-existent and the king and his officials depended greatly on the regional lords for all governance, within towns and without, except in the royal demesne. Thus no independent political power existed to encourage the growth of the merchant class in an independent manner, although exceptions existed and some private individuals could become very wealthy. Chinese towns and villages were part of a fully integrated political system and the merchants remained under the political control of the aristocracy instead of setting up an independent trading or mercantile economy.

Regardless of the similarities of an overwhelmingly agrarian society being dominated by the feudal lords in both societies, the application of the term 'feudal' to the society of the Western Zhou has been a subject of considerable debate due to the differences between the two systems. The Zhou fengjian system was termed as being 'protobureaucratic' and bureaucracy existed alongside feudalism, while in Europe, bureaucracy emerged as a counter system to the feudal order.

Therefore, according to some historians, the term "feudalism" is not an exact fit for the Western Zhou political structure but it can be considered a system somewhat analogous to the one that existed in medieval Europe. According to Terence J. Byres in Feudalism and Non European Societies, "feudalism in China no longer represents a deviation from the norm based on European feudalism, but is a classic case of feudalism in its own right." According to Li Feng, the term "feudalism" is not at all an apt descriptor for the Western Zhou political structure, due to differences in the relationship between the monarch and regional lords, differences in governance of regional states, contrasts in military organization, and the absence of an ordered system of ranks.

== See also ==
- Ancient Chinese states
  - List of states in Shang Dynasty
  - List of states in Zhou Dynasty
- Eighteen Kingdoms
- Agriculture in China
- Economic history of China
- Ejido
- Mufu
- Feudal Japan
  - Han system
- Ritsuryō

== Bibliography ==
- Bloom, I. (1999). "The evolution of Confucian tradition in antiquity". In De Bary, William Theodore; Chan, Wing-tsit; Lufrano, Richard John; Adler, Joseph (eds.). Sources of Chinese Tradition. Vol. 2. New York: Columbia University Press.
- Byres, Terence; Mukhia, Harbans (1985). Feudalism and Non European Societies. Bristol: Stonebridge Press. ISBN 0-7146-3245-7.
- Dirlik, Arif (1985). Feudalism and Non European Societies. London: Frank Cass and Co. ISBN 0-7146-3245-7.
- Lewis, Mark Edward (2006). The Construction of Space in Early China. Albany: State University of New York Press.
- Fu Zhufu (1981). "The economic history of China: Some special problems". Modern China. 7 (1): 3–30. doi:10.1177/009770048100700101. S2CID 220738994.
- Li Feng (2008). Bureaucracy and the State in Early China. Cambridge: Cambridge University Press. ISBN 978-0-521-88447-1.
- Roberts, John A.G. (1999). A Concise History of China. First United Kingdom. ISBN 0-674-00074-9.
- Wu Ta-k'un (1952). "An Interpretation of Chinese Economic History". Past & Present (1): 1–12. doi:10.1093/past/1.1.1.
