= Weizi of Song =

Weizi of Song 宋微子

Duke of Song
- Reign: c. 1038–1025 BC
- Predecessor: New title
- Successor: Weizhong
Names
- Ancestral name: Zǐ (子); Lineage name: Sòng (宋); Given name: Qǐ (啓)
- Father: Di Yi of Shang

Weizi (Chinese: 微子), also spelled Wei Tsze, was the first ruler of Song. He was the subject of Chapter 18 of the Analects of Confucius.

Weizi was the eldest son of Di Yi. He was first enfeoffed at Wei (微), hence Lord of Wei (微子). He was also a half-brother of the last Shang king, Di Xin (better known as King Zhou of Shang). Di Xin gave himself over to drinking, women and abandoned morals. Weizi tried to persuade him not to do so, but Di Xin ignored. Subsequently, Weizi resigned and withdrew from the court.

When Zhou dynasty conquered the Shang kingdom, Weizi submitted and presented the ritual utensils to King Wu of Zhou. He was pardoned by King Wu.

After Rebellion of the Three Guards was put down, Weizi was enfeoffed as Duke of Song and granted land at Shangqiu (商邱 'the hill of Shang'), where the capital of the new State of Song was built. After his death, he was succeeded by his younger brother Yan (衍), historically known as Weizhong (Chinese: 微仲; lit. 'The Second of Wei').

Weizi was honored by Confucius as one of the "three men of virtue" (三仁) of the Shang, together with Jizi and Bigan. Weizi was entitled by Emperor Shun of Yuan, named Renjing Gong (仁靖公) at late of Yuan Dynasty.

== Name ==
His personal name is Qi (啓), ancestral name Zi (子) of the Shang kings and lineage name Song (宋) which later was passed down to the Song lords. Weizi (微子) is his posthumous name, with zi (子) meaning either "master" (educated man) or "viscount" and wei (微) meaning "humble." Hence, his title can be fully interpreted as either "Humble Viscount of Song" or "Humble Master of Song."

His younger brother inherited the part wei (微) of his posthumous name as Weizhong, with zhong (仲) meaning the "second-born (of the family,)" indicating the former being a younger brother to the latter.
