= J. A. G. Roberts =

British historian (born 1935)

John Anthony George Roberts (born 1935) is a British historian and a principal lecturer in history at the University of Huddersfield, UK. He has lectured extensively on the histories of China and Japan and has a special interest in Western perceptions of Chinese and Japanese society. He is the author of A History of China (2000) and China to Chinatown: Chinese Food in the West (2002).
