= King Cheng of Zhou =

Second king of the Zhou dynasty

King Cheng of Zhou 周成王
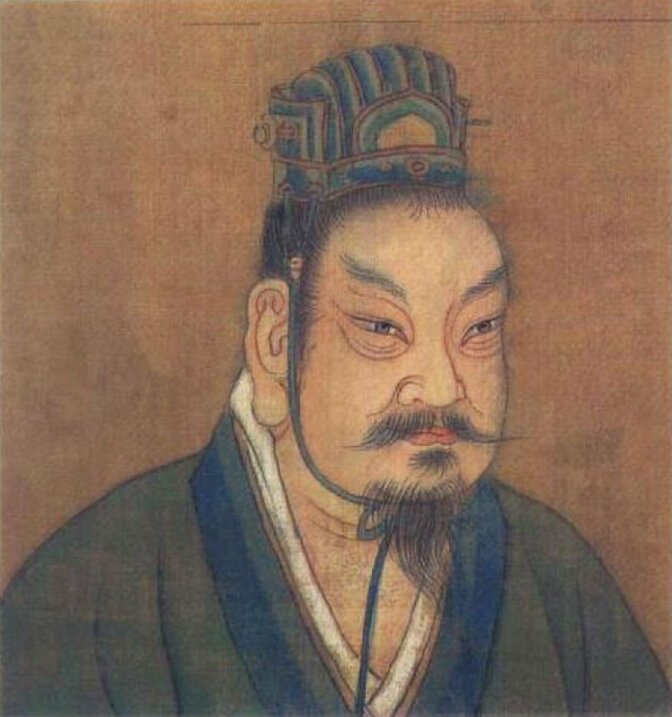
- Posthumous depiction from the Qing dynasty

King of the Zhou dynasty
- Reign: 1042–1021 BCE
- Predecessor: King Wu of Zhou
- Successor: King Kang of Zhou
- Regent: Ji Dan
- Born: 1055 BC
- Died: 1021 BC
- Spouse: Wang Si
- Issue: King Kang of Zhou
Names
- Ancestral name: Jī (姬); Given name: Sòng (誦)
Posthumous name
- King Cheng (成王)
- House: Ji
- Dynasty: Zhou (Western Zhou)
- Father: King Wu of Zhou
- Mother: Yi Jiang

King Cheng of Zhou

Posthumous name
- Chinese: 周成王
- Literal meaning: The Accomplished King of Zhou; The Successful King of Zhou
Transcriptions
Standard Mandarin
- Hanyu Pinyin: Zhōu Chéng Wáng
- Wade–Giles: Chou Chéng-wang; King Chéng of Chou

King Cheng of Zhou (Chinese: 周成王; pinyin: Zhōu Chéng Wáng; Wade–Giles: Chou^{1} Ch‘êng^{2} Wang^{2}; 1055–1021 BC), personal name Ji Song, was the second king of the Chinese Zhou dynasty. The dates of his reign are 1042–1021 BCE or 1042/35–1006 BCE. Ji Dan, Duke of Zhou served as regent during his minority. His parents were King Wu of Zhou and Queen Yi Jiang.

== Life ==
King Cheng was young when he ascended the throne. His paternal uncle the Duke of Zhou, fearing that Shang forces might rise again under the possible weak rule of a young ruler, became the regent and supervised government affairs for several years.

At some point during the king's childhood, he grew ill, which prompted the Duke of Zhou to cut off his hair, throw it into the Yellow River, and pray, stating:

王少未有識，奸神命者乃旦也。
The King is a child and still without awareness. If any monster has offended the deity's orders, it is I, Dan.

== Reign ==
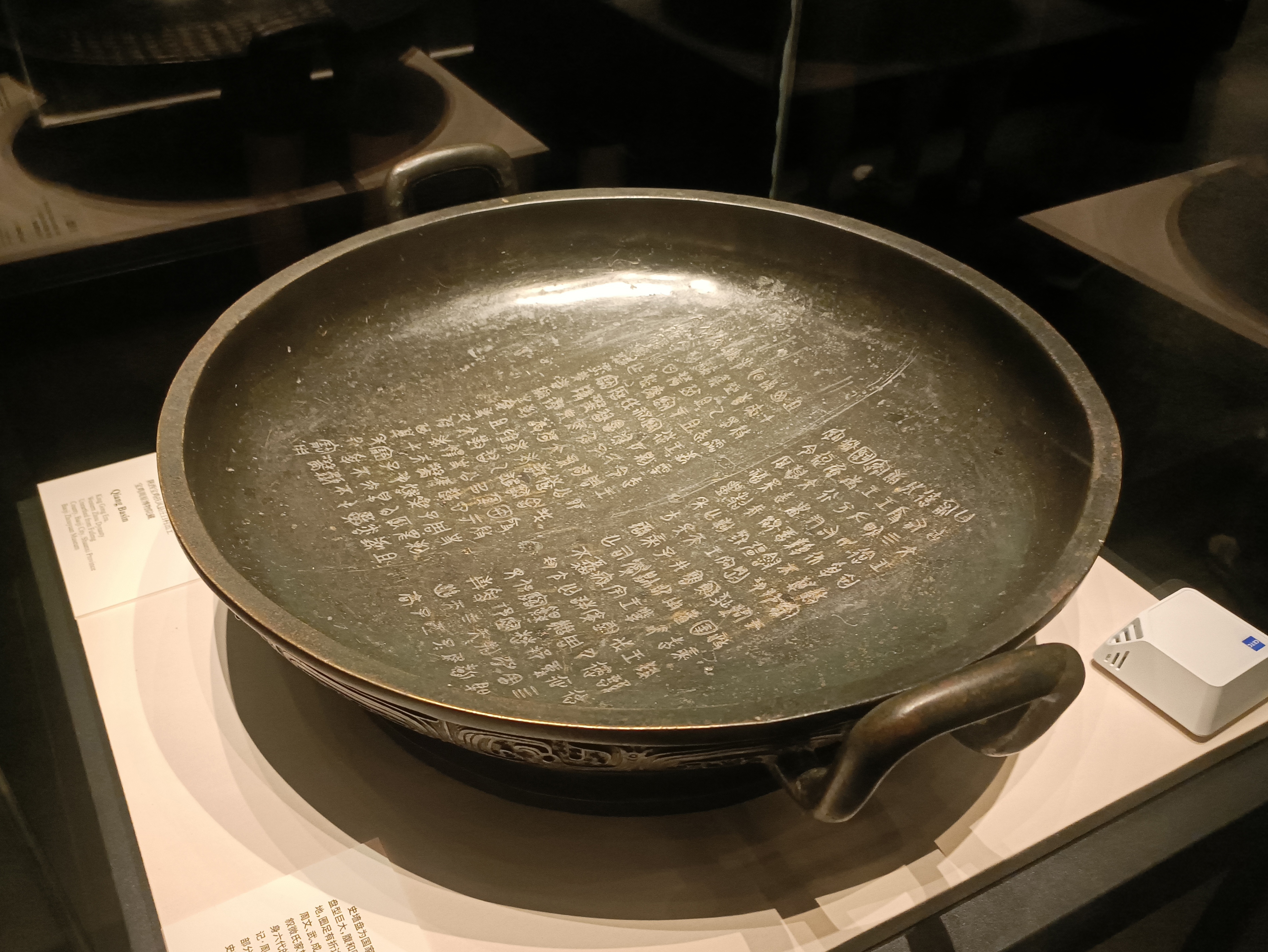
The Qiang pan, which lists the achievements of the first seven rulers of Zhou, including King Cheng.

King Cheng came into power during a turbulent time. King Wu of Zhou had not long defeated Di Xin at the Battle of Muye, leaving a throne that had yet to assert itself. However, for the first six years of his reign, King Cheng had the Duke of Zhou serve as regent, due to his young age and feeble body. During these years, the Duke would establish the capital at Luoyang, then teach King Cheng the ins and outs of running the nation, thus cementing the coming Zhou dynasty. Shuo Yuan gives a short account of King Cheng playing with a leaf and bestowing the State of Tang onto the Duke as a game; the Duke then said that a king must keep their word, wherein the Duke was officially enfeoffed. The Duke of Zhou would write many treatises for the young king, with concerns ranging from minor quibbles to potential arrogance. Some of these are recorded in Records of the Grand Historian.

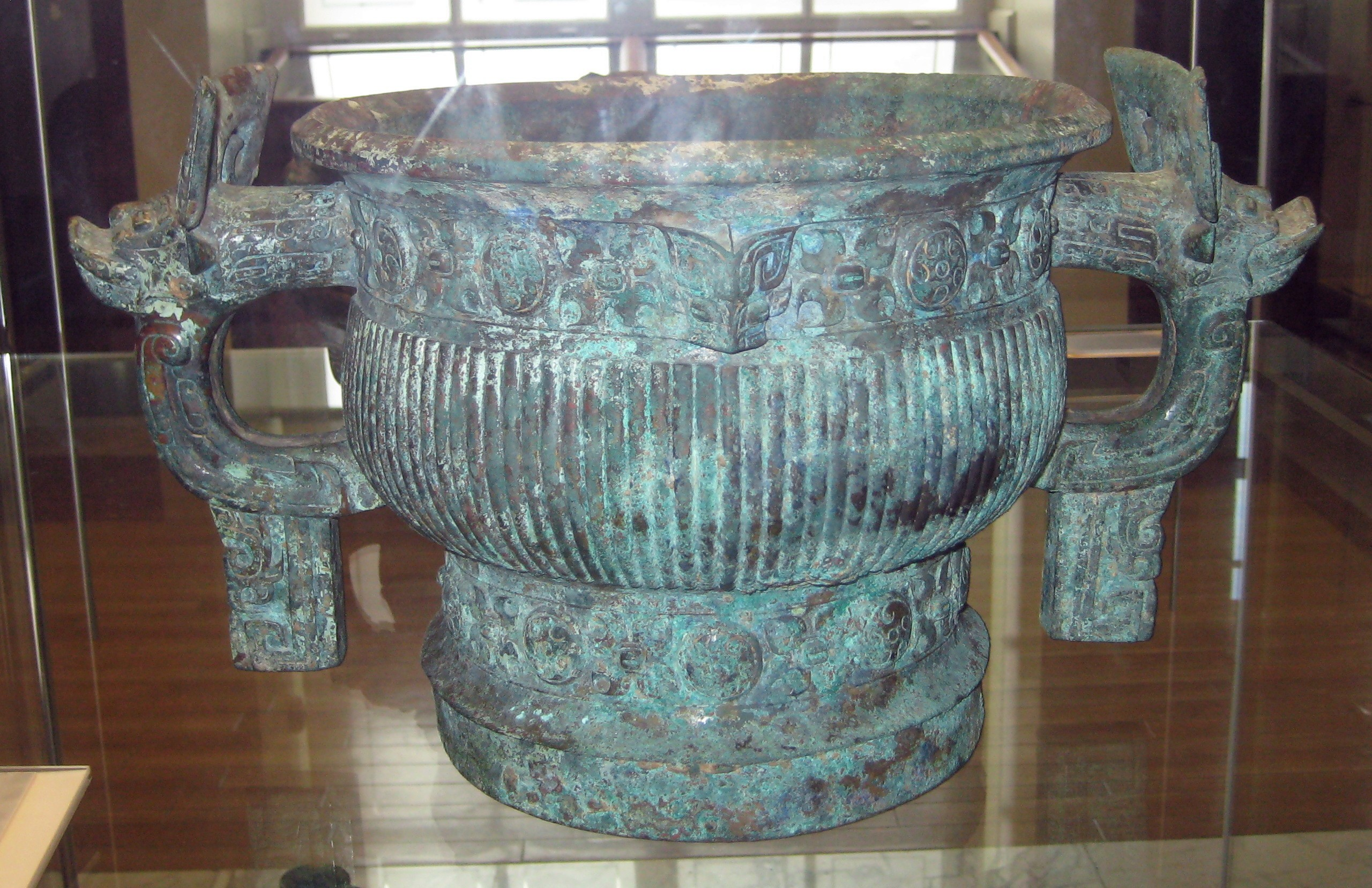
The Kang Hou gui, cast shortly after the Rebellion of the Three Guards for Shu of Wey-Kang.

When the Duke of Zhou took regency, this was not without problems. King Cheng's uncles, Shu Xian of Guan and Shu Du of Cai, as well as the son of Di Xin, Wu Geng, disagreed with the Duke of Zhou's regency, and believed that they should have the right to it. They therefore conspired together, sparking the Rebellion of the Three Guards, which the Duke of Zhou was forced to settle through eastern offensives.

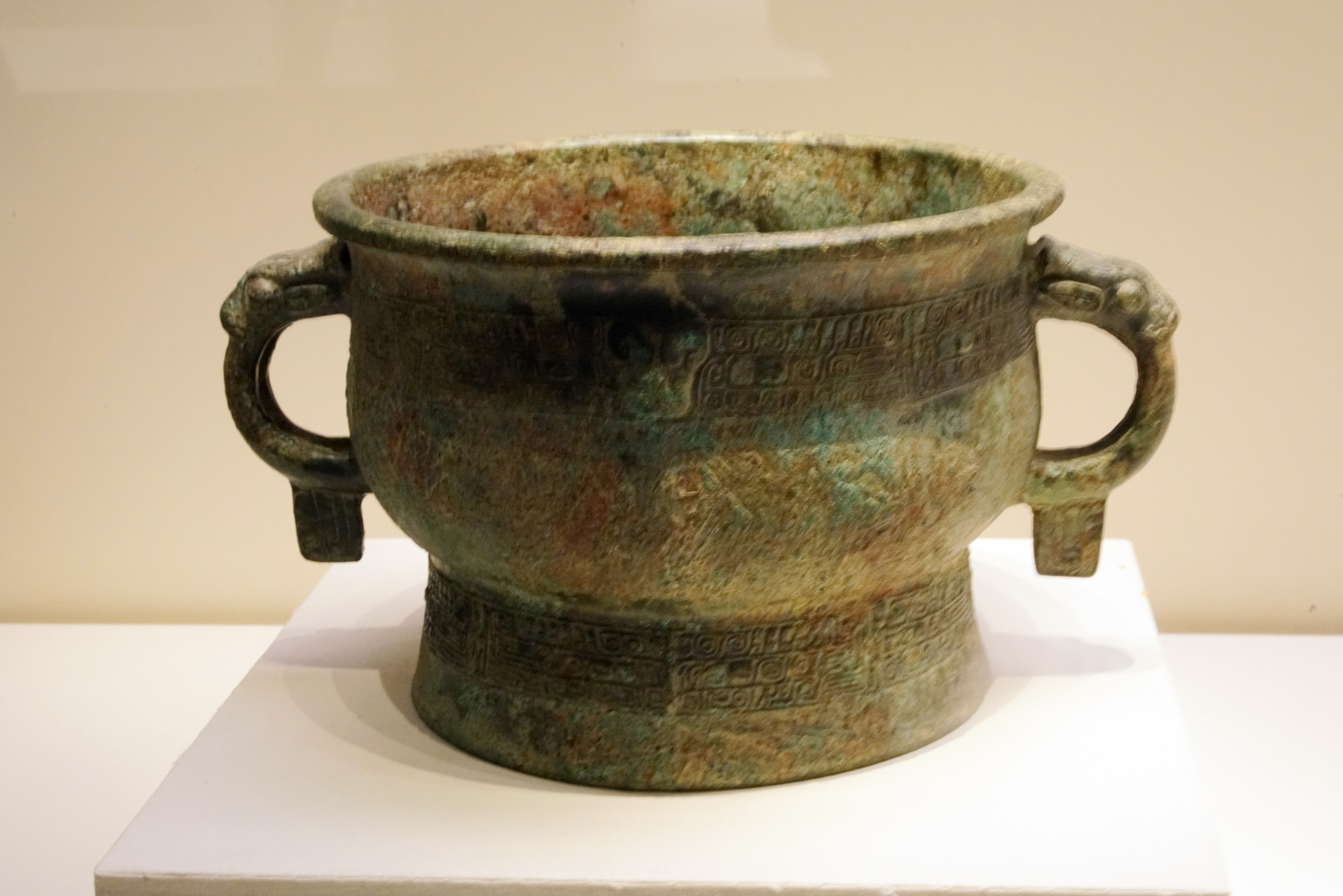
A contemporary gui recording an invasion against the Marquess of Yan.

The Bamboo Annals says the following about King Cheng's reign:

- In his first year, King Cheng appointed the Duke of Zhou to regent. A while later, the Duke addressed the feudal lords in Huangmen (皇門). In autumn, King Cheng received his cap to celebrate his coming of age, and then Wu Geng began his Rebellion of the Three Guards.
- In the second year, the people of Yan and Xu, as well as the Huayi, entered Bei (邶) to rebel. The Duke of Zhou returned from the east and launched a campaign against Yin.
- In the third year, Wu Geng was defeated and killed. The Shang people of Yin were then relocated to Wey (衛), Yan was attacked, and Pugu was destroyed.
- In the fourth year, court officials met formally for the first time, and grain was tasted for the first time. The Shang people were relocated to Luoyi, and Chengzhou was established.
- In the sixth year, a military review was held in Qiyang (岐陽).
- In the seventh year, the Duke of Zhou stepped down from regency, and the king toured Luodu. The Eastern Capital was then established, to which King Cheng went, and feudal lords paid homage.
- In the eighth year, King Cheng did true governance for the first time, destroying the State of Tang and relocating its people to Du (杜). The Shang people were also relocated to Lu.
  - Jia Yi mentions that King Cheng was 20 when he ascended the throne, and had enquired about the Dao and revitalising a state.
- In the ninth year, an offering ceremony was held at the Grand Temple, and the Shao (勺) ritual was used for the first time. The Sushen (肅慎) clan came to pay homage, and King Cheng ordered Rong Bo (榮伯) to bestow a title upon them.
- In the tenth year, the king appointed Tang Shuyu (唐叔虞) as marquis. The Yuechang (越裳) clan came to pay homage. The Duke of Zhou left court and resided in Feng (豐).
- In the eleventh year, the king went to Feng. Tang Shuyu presented auspicious grain, and the king ordered him to deliver it to the Duke of Zhou. King Cheng appointed Duke Zhou of Ping to govern the Eastern Capital.
- In the twelfth year, the king led an army from Yan to build a city at Han (韓), and he bestowed a title upon the Marquis of Han.
- In the thirteenth year, the royal forces joined with Duke Qi and Duke Lu to attack the Rong. In summer, Lu held a grand ancestral sacrifice at the Temple of the Duke of Zhou.
- In the fourteenth year, Qin forces besieged Qu Cheng (曲城) and captured it. In winter, the completion of Luoyi was reported.
- In the eighteenth year, the king went to Luoyi to establish the Nine Tripod Cauldrons. The Fenghuang appeared, and an offering ceremony was held at the Yellow River.
- In the nineteenth year, King Cheng conducted an inspection tour of the regional domains and mountain shrines, accompanied by Duke Kang of Zhao. He returned to Zongzhou, reorganised the officials, and demoted the Marquis of Feng.
- In the twenty-first year, the administrative system of xiang (象) was abolished. The Duke of Zhou died in Feng.
- In the twenty-second year, the Duke of Zhou was buried in Bi (畢).
  - Sima Qian expands on this. When the Duke of Zhou fell ill, he said that he must be buried in Chengzhou to show that he never left King Cheng's side. King Cheng could not dare to regard the Duke as a subject, and instead buried him in Bi (畢) alongside King Wen of Zhou. Thereafter, the autumn harvest was beset by a severe storm. King Cheng and his ministers donned ritual attire and opened a chest, which contained the Duke's diary of his self-sacrifice for King Wu, to which King Cheng wept and demanded to no longer have things hidden from him. The storm stopped.
- In the twenty-fourth year, envoys from Yu (於越) came to pay homage.
- In the twenty-fifth year, the king held a grand assembly of feudal lords in the Eastern Capital, and envoys from all directions attended. In winter, he returned and held an offering ceremony at the Grand Ancestral Temple.
- In the thirtieth year, envoys from Li Rong (離戎) came to pay homage.
- In the thirty-third year, the king toured Juan'a (卷阿) with Duke Kang of Zhao. After returning to Zongzhou, he ordered Crown Prince Zhao to go to Fang (房) to escort his bride; Fang Bo Qi (房伯祈) was married and brought back to Zongzhou.
- In the thirty-fourth year, a rain of gold fell in Xianyang.
- In the thirty-seventh year, on the yichou day of the fourth month, King Cheng died.

== Death ==
During his twilight years, King Cheng was unsure of whether his son, Ji Zhao, was up to the task of carrying his legacy. Remembering the care the Duke of Zhou gave him, he ordered the Duke of Shao and Duke of Bi to teach him how to run the nation, composing The Dying Emperor's Will (顧命), recorded in the Book of Documents and extant. Within, he tells the dukes to ensure that King Kang does not rush headlong down the wrong path. He wrote on a jade tablet the following, which would be given to the incoming King Kang of Zhou:

皇后憑玉几，道揚末命：命汝嗣訓，臨君周邦，率循大卞，燮和天下，用答揚文武之光訓。
This Sovereign, leaning upon that jade armrest, utters his final order: ‘I command you to carry on the instruction, to preside over Zhou, to follow the great statutes, to harmonise and pacify all under heaven, and so to answer and exalt the glorious teachings of King Wen and King Wu.

== Family ==
Queens:

- Wang Si, of the Si clan (王姒 姒姓), the mother of Crown Prince Zhao

Sons:

- Crown Prince Zhao (太子釗; 1040–996 BC), ruled as King Kang of Zhou from 1020 to 996 BC

== See also ==
- Family tree of Chinese monarchs (ancient)
- Duke of Zhao

King Cheng of Zhou Zhou dynasty Died: 1021 BC
Regnal titles
Preceded by King Wu of Zhou	King of China; 1042–1021 BC	Succeeded by King Kang of Zhou
