= Duke of Zhou =

Regent of the early Western Zhou dynasty

Dan, Duke of Zhou 周公旦
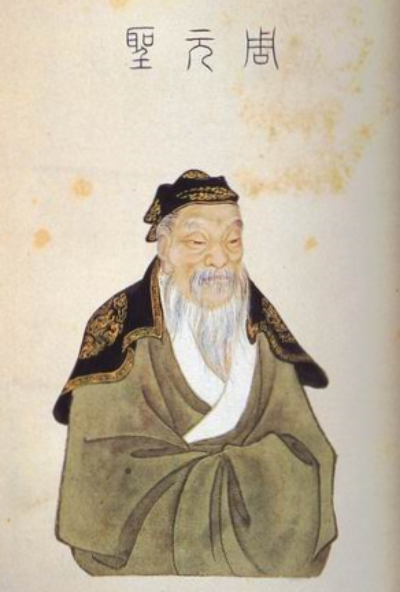
- Painting of the Duke of Zhou, made during the reign of the Qianlong Emperor, Qing dynasty.

Regent of the Zhou dynasty
- Reign: 1042–1035 BC
- Predecessor: King Wu of Zhou
- Successor: King Cheng of Zhou

Duke of Zhou
- Reign: c. 1046 BC - ?
- Predecessor: Position established
- Successor: Duke Ping of Zhou
- Issue: Bo Qin
Posthumous name
- Duke Wen of Zhou (Chinese: 周文公); King Baode (Chinese: 褒德王), honored by Wu Zetian; King Wenxian (Chinese: 文憲王), honoured by Zhenzong of Song
- Father: King Wen of Zhou
- Mother: Tai Si
- Military career
- Allegiance: Predynastic Zhou; Western Zhou
- Conflicts: Battle of Muye; Rebellion of the Three Guards

Duke of Zhou
- Chinese: 周公旦
Transcriptions
Standard Mandarin
- Hanyu Pinyin: Zhōu Gōng Dàn
- Wade–Giles: Chou^{1} Kung^{1} Tan^{4}
- IPA: [ʈʂóʊ kʊ́ŋ tân]
Yue: Cantonese
- Yale Romanization: Jāu Gūng Daan
- Jyutping: Zau1 Gung1 Daan3
- IPA: [tsɐw˥kʊŋ˥tan˧]
Southern Min
- Hokkien POJ: Chiu Kong Tàn
Old Chinese
- Baxter–Sagart (2014): *tiw C.qˤoŋ [d]ˤa[n]ʔ

Personal name
- Chinese: 姬旦
Transcriptions
Standard Mandarin
- Hanyu Pinyin: Jī Dàn
- Wade–Giles: Chi^{1} Tan^{4}
Yue: Cantonese
- Yale Romanization: Gēi Daan
- Jyutping: Gei1 Daan3
Southern Min
- Hokkien POJ: Ki Tàn
Old Chinese
- Baxter–Sagart (2014): *[k](r)ə [d]ˤa[n]ʔ

Posthumous name
- Chinese: 周文公
Transcriptions
Standard Mandarin
- Hanyu Pinyin: Zhōu Wén Gōng

Ji Dan, Duke Wen of Zhou, commonly known as the Duke of Zhou, was a member of the royal family of the early Zhou dynasty who played a major role in consolidating the kingdom established by his elder brother King Wu. He was renowned for acting as a capable and loyal regent for his young nephew King Cheng, and for successfully suppressing the Rebellion of the Three Guards and establishing firm rule of the Zhou dynasty over eastern China. He is also a Chinese culture hero, with the authorship of the I Ching and the Classic of Poetry having traditionally been attributed to him, as well as the establishment of the Rites of Zhou.

== Biography ==
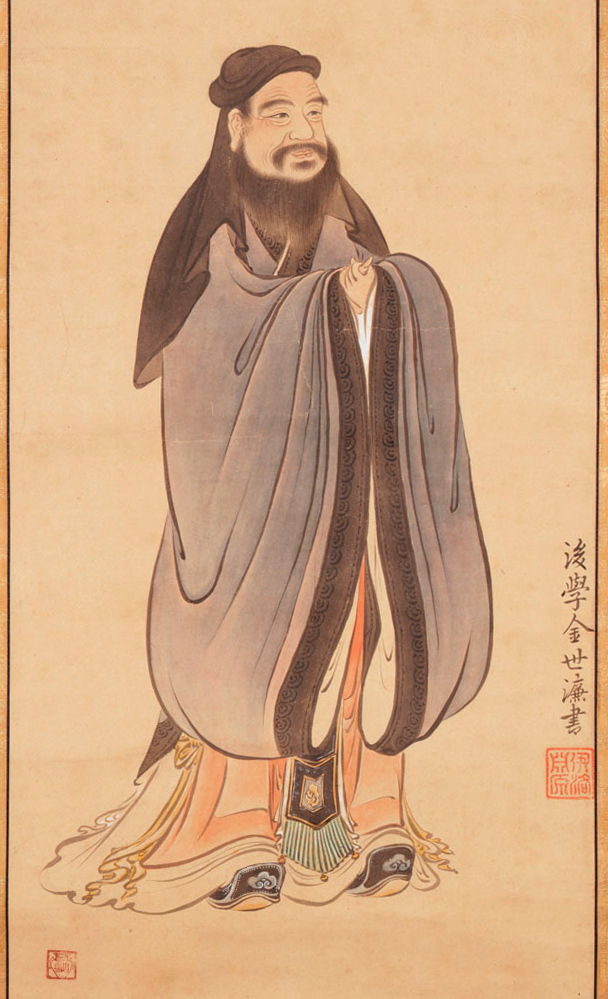
Painting of the Duke of Zhou by Kanō Sansetsu. Japan, Edo period, 1632.

=== Predynastic Zhou ===
The Duke of Zhou was born with the personal name Dan (旦) of the Ji clan (姬), during a time in which the Shang dynasty was in a perceived period of decline, having a series of rulers that the Chinese classics record as being corrupt, incompetent, or otherwise immoral. Chief amongst these was Di Xin, who was an alcoholic. Ji Dan was the fourth son of Ji Chang, King Wen of Zhou and Queen Tai Si. Ji Dan was noted for his filial conduct and moral aptitude compared to his other brothers from a young age. He would assist King Wen, but to what extent is unclear.

At first, Ji Chang, King Wen of Zhou would refuse to act, as the Predynastic Zhou maintained a good relationship by serving as their western vanguard. The Lost Book of Zhou claims that Ji Chang consulted Ji Dan regarding what to do should the situation in Shang continue to decline. Ji Dan was ordered to deliberate on the situation whilst Ji Chang attended to other matters. However, this account is debated, as the chapters written here appear to have been written later than other chunks of the book.

Eventually, Ji Chang expressed dissatisfaction with the Shang state, which Marquess Hu of Chong picked up on. He told Di Xin and Ji Chang was imprisoned, but was later released. Following a major astrological event, King Wen would devise a plan to sack the Shang capital of Yin, and execute it by coercing, invading, and annexing Shang allies over time, but died before this could be complete. This was the Mandate of Heaven doctrine, which influenced Ji Dan considerably. Ji Fa, King Wu of Zhou would take up the mantle of sacking Yin, and Ji Dan would join, taking a much larger role in government.

==== Battle of Muye ====
During the ninth year of Ji Fa's reign, Ji Fa gathered 800 feudal lords and went on an expedition to Mengjin (盟津), along with Ji Dan as an active assistant. However, despite the lords pleading for an attack on Yin, Ji Fa denied the request for the will of Heaven, in his eyes, decreed against it. The Lost Book of Zhou writes that Ji Fa continually consulted Ji Dan during this period, continuing his deliberations from under Ji Chang's rule. Two years later, he surmised that the time was right, wherein the Oath at Muye was written, recorded in the Book of Documents.

While Ji Dan certainly participated in the Battle of Muye, his role is unclear, with later accounts deeming him a strategist who participated in ceremonial rites. However, the earliest materials either depict him as a soldier, or not at all. The Lost Book of Zhou writes of Ji Dan holding a ceremonial axe and the Duke of Shao holding a smaller one, flanking Ji Fa as they finish the battle together. However, earlier segments of the book that are said to be from Western Zhou, or even contemporary with the events, do not mention him at all.

=== Political career ===
==== Under King Wen and King Wu ====
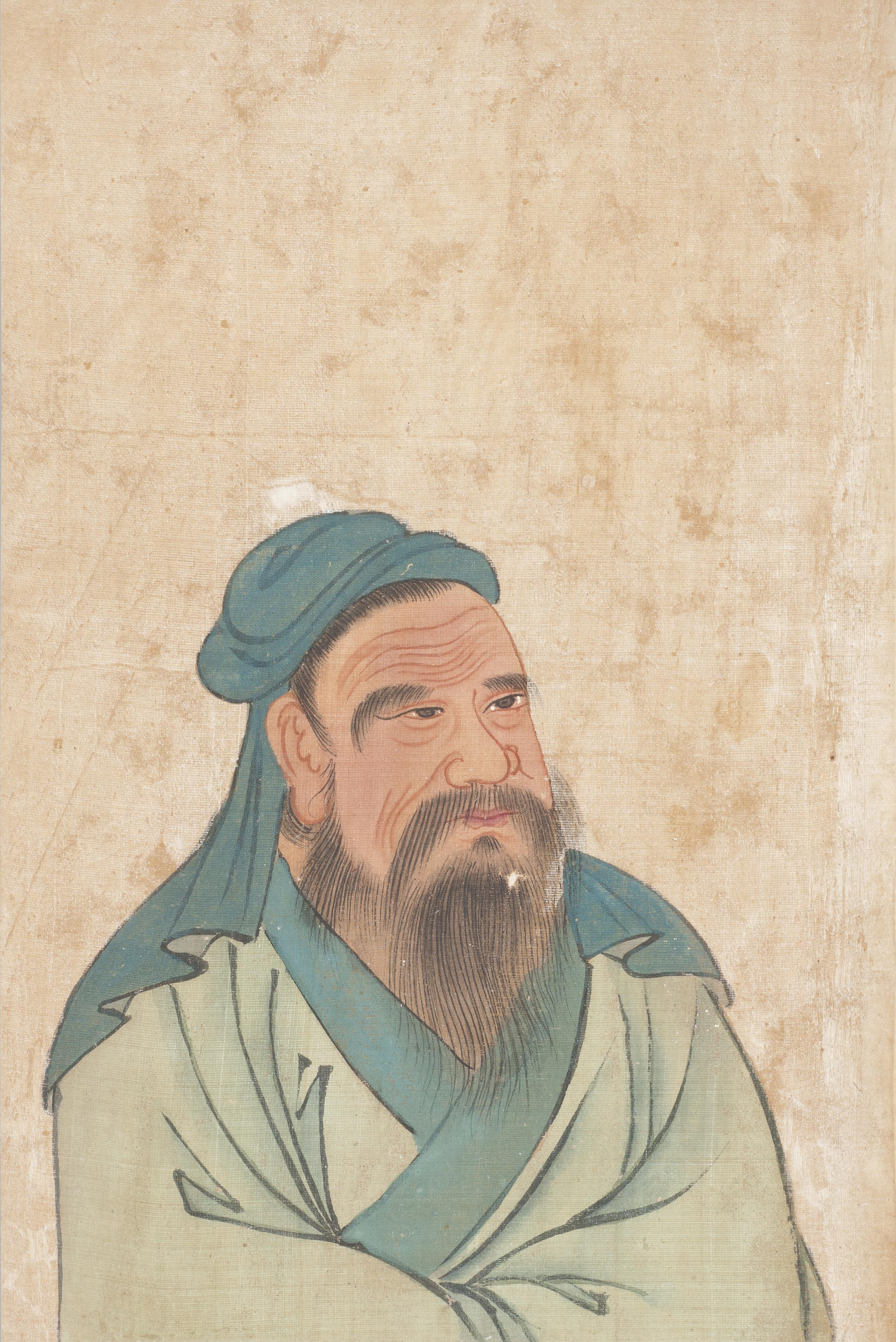
As depicted in the album Portraits of Famous Men, c. 1900 CE, housed in the Philadelphia Museum of Art

Ji Dan, being a royal son, was heavily involved in government from a young age. Activity increased considerably after the Battle of Muye, where he was a chief advisor to the newly-enthroned Ji Fa, King Wu of Zhou. King Wu distributed many fiefs to his relatives and followers. Ji Dan was offered a fief in Qufu, Lu, but he refused to continue governing in Zhou, and Bo Qin, his son, took it instead. Therefore, he remained in Haojing with a fief, and because it was in Zhou, he became the Duke of Zhou.

The Metal-Bound Coffer anecdote in the Book of Documents records King Wu falling ill, to which the Duke of Zhou prayed for his safety. Around this time, he is said to have composed Owl (Chi Xiao 鴟鴞), recorded in the Classic of Poetry under the Odes of Bin (豳風).

The Duke of Zhou was credited with elaborating the doctrine of the Mandate of Heaven, which countered Shang propaganda that as descendants of the god Shangdi they should be restored to power. According to this doctrine, Shang injustice and decadence had so grossly offended Heaven that Heaven had removed their authority and commanded the reluctant Zhou to replace the Shang and restore order, as Heaven itself follows the will of the people. Therefore upholding virtue and ruling with justice and clemency, showing pity to the orphans and widows, and ensure respectful treatment to everyone corresponds to the will of Heaven and the people, as Duke Zhou expresses and emphasized to the young king Cheng and his courtiers.

==== Regency of King Cheng ====
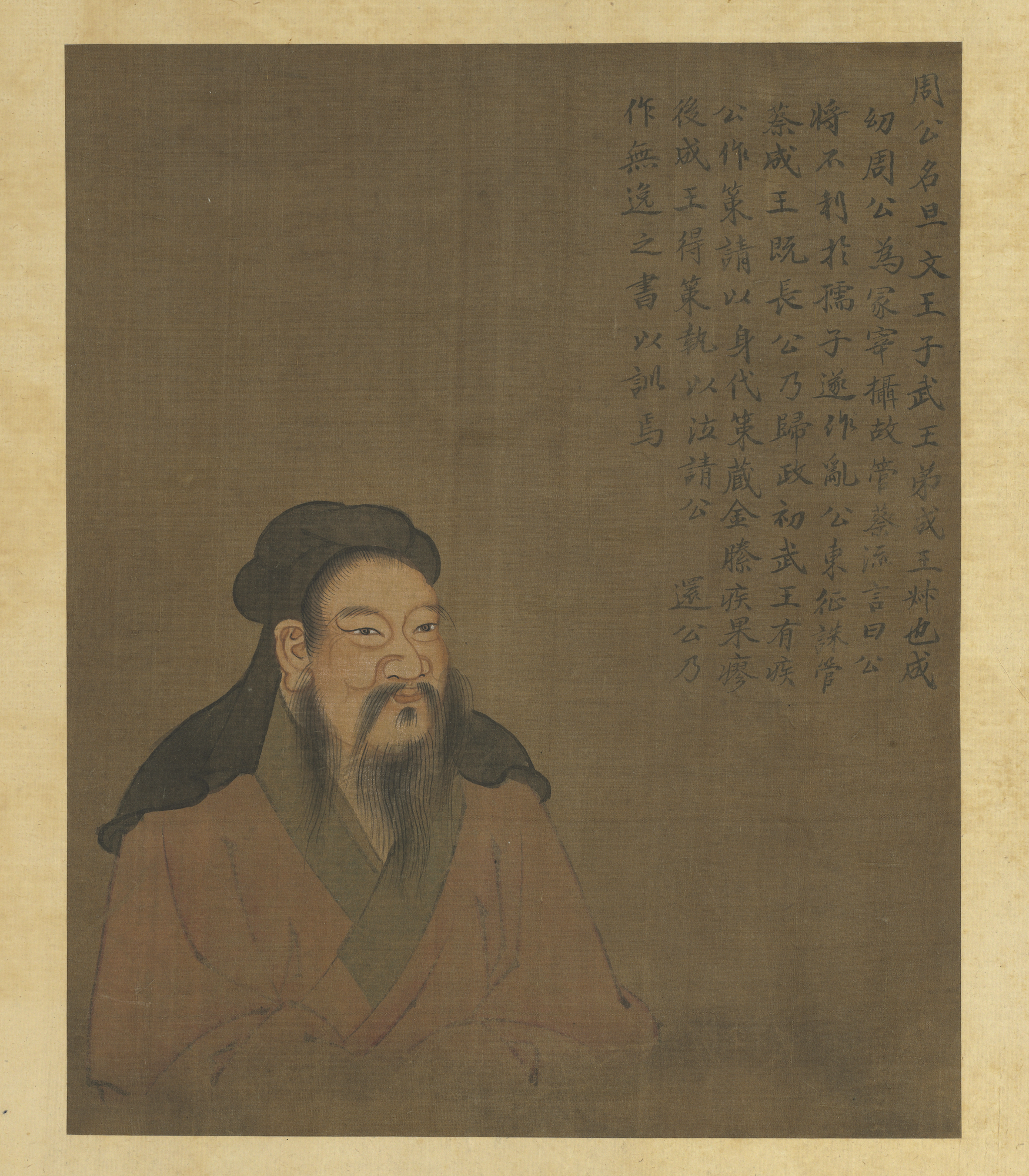
Duke of Zhou, album leaf, housed in the National Palace Museum

Only three years after assuming power, King Wu died and left the kingdom to his young son King Cheng. The Duke of Zhou successfully attained the regency and administered the kingdom himself, teaching the burgeoning king the ins and outs of government.

During his rule, Duke of Zhou expanded and codified King Wu's system of territorial administration, granting titles to loyal Shang clansmen and even establishing a new capital city at Chengzhou around 1038 BC. Laid out according to exact geomantic principles, Chengzhou was the home of King Cheng, the Shang nobility, and the nine tripod cauldrons symbolic of royal authority, while the Duke continued to administer the kingdom from the former capital of Haojing. Once Cheng came of age, according to traditional narrative, the Duke of Zhou dutifully gave up the throne without trouble. At some point, the new king became ill, to which the Duke of Zhou prayed for his safety. The Duke would also write numerous treatises for the young king.

However, the regency was not unquestioned. People from the recently-expunged Late Shang would question whether the Duke of Zhou was a legitimate ruler: As King Wu had died, some theorised that Wu Geng, the late Di Xin's heir apparent, should rule. This would lead to the Rebellion of the Three Guards, led by Wu Geng and three of the Duke of Zhou's siblings. Within five years, the Duke of Zhou had managed to defeat the Three Guards and other rebellions and his armies pushed east, bringing more land under Zhou control.

After the Rebellion of the Three Guards, Ji Feng, Kang Shu of Wey was to be stationed around Yin. The Duke of Zhou educated him on how to govern. Three treatises, recorded in the Book of Documents, are thought to be from this time, supported by the excavated Xinian (繫年). The first was him ordering Ji Feng to govern the conquered Shang people carefully, as they were politically dangerous due to their rebellion. He tells him to learn from the fall of Yin and use it as a mirror from which Zhou can learn. The second was a treatise against drunkenness, in which the duke posited that Di Xin's fall from grace and loss of the will of Heaven was due to his alcoholism, continuing a policy from King Wen's days. The order was to be published in Meibang (妹邦). Execution involved rehabilitating alcoholics and relocating them to Zhou, and punishing repeat offenders or those arranging gatherings involving alcohol. Alcoholic Ex-Shang ministers would also be rehabilitated and treated more leniently. The final treatise was a tutorial about government expressed through craftsmanship metaphor: Governing a state means linking ruler, minister, family, and the everyman together, and ruling successfully means not killing people and granting clemency where possible. The end details a disoriented Shang populace, which Ji Feng was tasked with managing.

== Legacy ==
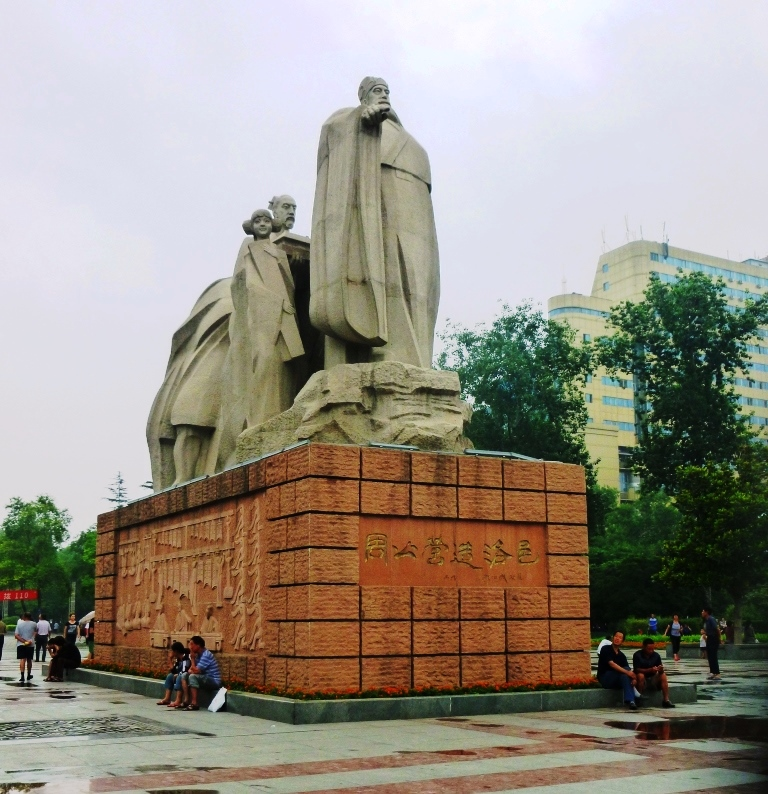
Statue of the Duke of Zhou who founded a city on the site of modern Luoyang c. 1038 BCE

The duke's eight sons all received land from the king. The eldest son received Lu; the second succeeded to his father's fief, Zhou.

The Duke of Zhou's campaign in the east to suppress the Rebellion of the Three Guards is remembered in Po Fu (破斧) in the Classic of Poetry. It repeatedly emphasises the Zhou state's victory over Guan, Cai, Yin, and Yan, and the subsequent reforms that brought them back under Zhou control.

In later centuries, subsequent emperors considered the Duke of Zhou a paragon of virtue and honored him with posthumous names. The empress Wu Zetian named her short-lived 8th-century Zhou dynasty (known as Wu Zhou in historiography) after him and called him the Honorable and Virtuous King (褒德王, Bāodé Wáng). In 1008, the Zhenzong Emperor gave the Duke the posthumous title King of Exemplary Culture (traditional Chinese: 文憲王; simplified Chinese: 文宪王; pinyin: Wénxiàn Wáng). He was also known as the First Sage (traditional Chinese: 元聖; simplified Chinese: 元圣; pinyin: Yuán Shèng).

In 2004, Chinese archaeologists reported that they may have found his tomb complex in Qishan County, Shaanxi, now named Zhougong Miao.

=== God of Dreams ===
Duke of Zhou is also known as the "God of Dreams". The Analects record Confucius saying, "How I have gone downhill! It has been such a long time since I dreamt of the Duke of Zhou." This was meant as a lamentation of how the governmental ideals of the Duke of Zhou had faded, but was later taken literally. In Chinese legends, if an important thing is going to happen to someone, the Duke of Zhou will let the person know through dreams: hence the Chinese expression "Dreaming of Zhou Gong". Zhou Gong's "Explanations of Dreams" (周公解夢; Zhōu gōng jiěmèng) is attributed to him.

=== Descendants ===
The main line of the Duke of Zhou's descendants came from his firstborn son, the State of Lu ruler Bo Qin's third son Yu (魚) whose descendants adopted the surname Dongye (東野). The Duke of Zhou's offspring held the title of Wujing Boshi (五經博士; Wǔjīng Bóshì). One of the Duke of Zhou's 72 generation descendants family tree was examined and commented on by Song Lian.

Duke Huan of Lu's son Qingfu (慶父) was an ancestor of Mencius. He was descended from Duke Yang of Lu, who was the son of Bo Qin, who was the son of the Duke of Zhou. The genealogy is found in the Mencius family tree (孟子世家大宗世系).

The Zhikou Jiangs (also romanized as "Chiangs") such as Chiang Kai-shek were descended from Jiang Shijie who during the 17th century moved there from Fenghua District, whose ancestors in turn came to southeastern China's Zhejiang province after moving out of Northern China in the 13th century CE. The 12th-century BCE Duke of Zhou's third son was the ancestor of the Jiangs.

== See also ==
- Chancellor (China)
- Family tree of Chinese monarchs (ancient)
