= Edward L. Shaughnessy =

American sinologist, scholar and educator (born 1952)

- Born: July 29, 1952 (age 74)
- Education: University of Notre Dame (BA); Stanford University (MA, PhD)
- Scientific career
- Fields: Zhou dynasty, Classic of Changes (Yi jing)
- Workplaces: University of Chicago
- Thesis: The Composition of the Zhouyi (1983)
- Doctoral advisor: David S. Nivison

Chinese name
- Chinese: 夏含夷
Transcriptions
Standard Mandarin
- Hanyu Pinyin: Xià Hányí

Edward Louis Shaughnessy (born July 29, 1952) is an American sinologist, scholar, and educator, known for his studies of early Chinese history, particularly the Zhou dynasty, and his studies of the Classic of Changes (I Ching 易經).

== Life and career ==
Edward Shaughnessy was born on July 29, 1952. He attended the University of Notre Dame as an undergraduate student, graduating in 1974 with a B.A. in theology, after which he spent several years studying Chinese in Taiwan and Japanese in Kyoto, Japan. He then went to Stanford University for graduate study in Asian languages, earning his Ph.D. in 1983 with a dissertation entitled "The Composition of the Zhouyi". After receiving his Ph.D., Shaughnessy joined the faculty of the Department of East Asian Languages and Civilizations at the University of Chicago, where he is currently the Lorraine J. and Herrlee G. Creel Distinguished Service Professor of Early Chinese Studies.

Shaughnessy's wife, Elena Valussi, is an Italian scholar of East Asian history who teaches at Loyola University Chicago. They have two children.

== Selected works ==
- Shaughnessy, Edward L. (1983). "The Composition of the Zhouyi". Ph.D. dissertation (Stanford University).
- ——— (1986). "On the Authenticity of the Bamboo Annals". Harvard Journal of Asiatic Studies. 46 (1): 149–180. doi:10.2307/2719078. JSTOR 2719078.
- ——— (1992). Sources of Western Zhou History: Inscribed Bronze Vessels. Berkeley: University of California Press. ISBN 0-520-07028-3.
- ——— (1994). "A First Reading of the Mawangdui Yijing Manuscript". Early China. 19: 47–73. doi:10.1017/S0362502800003552. S2CID 247327998.
- ——— (1997). Before Confucius: Studies in the Creation of the Chinese Classics. SUNY Series in Chinese Philosophy and Culture. Albany: State University of New York Press. ISBN 0-791-43378-1.
- ——— (1997). I Ching: the Classic of Changes. New York: Ballantyne Books. ISBN 0-345-36243-8.
- ———, ed. (1997). New Sources of Early Chinese History: An Introduction to the Reading of Inscriptions and Manuscripts. Early China Monograph Series 3. Berkeley: Society for the Study of Early China; Institute for East Asian Studies, University of California Berkeley. ISBN 1-55729-058-X
- ———; Loewe, Michael, eds. (1999). The Cambridge History of Ancient China. Cambridge: Cambridge University Press. ISBN 978-0-521-47030-8
- ———, ed. (2005). China: Empire and Civilization. Oxford: Oxford University Press. ISBN 0-19-518287-1
- ——— (2006). Rewriting Early Chinese Texts. Albany: State University of New York Press. ISBN 0-7914-6643-4.
- ——— (2014). Unearthing the Changes: Recently Discovered Manuscripts of the Yi Jing (I Ching) and Related Texts. Translations from the Asian Classics. New York: Columbia University Press. ISBN 978-0231161848.
- A Brief History of Ancient China. London: Bloomsbury Academic. 2023. ISBN 9781350170414.
