= Li Feng (sinologist) =

Chinese-born American academic and sinologist (born 1962)

- 李峰
- Born: 1962 (age 63–64)
- Occupations: Sinologist, archaeologist, historian, professor

Academic background
- Education: Institute of Archaeology, Chinese Academy of Social Sciences; University of Chicago; University of Tokyo

Academic work
- Discipline: Sinology, archaeology, history
- Sub-discipline: Ancient Chinese history
- Institutions: Columbia University
- Main interests: Shang-Zhou bronze inscriptions

Li Feng (Chinese: 李峰; pinyin: Lǐ Fēng; born 1962), or Feng Li, is a professor of Early Chinese History and Archaeology at Columbia University, where he is director of graduate studies for the Department of East Asian Languages and Culture. He received his MA in 1986 from the Institute of Archaeology, Chinese Academy of Social Sciences, and his Ph.D. in 2000 from the University of Chicago. He also did Ph.D. work in the University of Tokyo (1991). He is both a field archaeologist and an historian of Early China with primary interest in bronze inscriptions of the Shang-Zhou period. Additionally, his first collaborative archaeological project in China sought Guicheng city of the Bronze Age Shandong Province. Li founded the Columbia Early China Seminar in 2002, and directed Columbia's first archaeological field project in China, in the Shandong Peninsula, in 2006–2011.

When sinologist Cho-yun Hsu's Western Chou Civilization (1988) was reprinted in Chinese in 2012, Hsu invited Li Feng to write a chapter-length postscript to update the book with new discoveries made in the intervening decades. In his preface, Hsu praised Li's expertise in both field archaeology and traditional history, and expressed his hope that Li would one day write a new history of the Zhou (Chou) dynasty to supersede his work.

== Selected publications ==
- Landscape and Power in Early China: The Crisis and Fall of the Western Zhou 1045-771 BC Cambridge University Press, 2006.
- Bureaucracy and the State in Early China: Governing the Western Zhou Cambridge University Press, 2008.
- Writing and Literacy in Early China (co-edited with David Branner); UW Press, 2011.
- Early China: A Social and Cultural History Cambridge University Press, 2013.
- Guicheng: A Study of the Formation of States on the Jiaodong Peninsula in Late Bronze-Age China, 1000-500 BCE.
