= Shu Xian of Guan =

Duke of Guan and one of the Three Guards

Duke of Guan Shu Xian of Guan
- 管叔鮮
- Xian (鮮) in small seal script.

Personal details
- Born: c. 11th Century BCE Predynastic Zhou
- Died: c. 1039 BCE Yin
- Cause of death: Executed
- Parents: King Wen of Zhou (father); Tai Si (mother)

Chinese name
- Traditional Chinese: 管叔鮮
- Simplified Chinese: 管叔鲜
Transcriptions
Standard Mandarin
- Hanyu Pinyin: Guǎn shū xiān
- Military career
- Allegiance: Yin
- Conflicts: Rebellion of the Three Guards (executed)

Shu Xian of Guan (Chinese: 管叔鮮; lit. 'Xian', '[Royal] Uncle of Guan') was the first and only ruler of the ancient Chinese city-state of Guan and was the younger brother of King Wu of Zhou, founder of the Zhou dynasty.

== Life ==
He was the third son of King Wen of Zhou, and one of the Three Guards responsible for overseeing the eastern lands of the newly founded Zhou dynasty. Three years into the first reign, King Wu died of an illness and left his underage son, Song, as king. Thus Ji Dan, the Duke of Zhou - who was the fourth son of King Wen - fearing that the kingdom might fall apart under an inexperienced king, took over government affairs as regent. This angered Shu Xian and the other two guards, who felt the Duke of Zhou had usurped the throne, and thus they joined Zi Wugeng, the son of the last king of Shang and nominal ruler of Yin, the old Shang capital, and began a rebellion against the regent. This was known as the Rebellion of the Three Guards. Following three years of war, the rebellion was crushed and Shu Xian, considered its main leader and culprit, was executed and the state of Guan was extinguished.

Sima Qian's Shiji states that Guan state was extinguished because Shu Xian left no descendants. Meanwhile, Zheng Qiao (鄭樵)'s Comprehensive Records asserts that Shu Xian had descendants who would take Guǎn (管) as their lineage surname (氏), and Lin Bao (林寶)'s Register of surnames of the Yuanhe reign states that Guan Zhong (born Yiwu) descended from Shu Xian, and Guan Zhong's 7th-generation-descendant Xiu, became grandee of Yin (隂大夫) and adopted the lineage surname Yin (隂).
