= The Legend and the Hero =

2007 Chinese television series

- DVD cover art
- 封神榜之凤鸣岐山
- Genre: Shenmo
- Based on: Investiture of the Gods by Xu Zhonglin and Lu Xixing
- Screenplay by: Cheng Ruilong; Chen Longxiang; Dahei
- Directed by: Jin Guozhao; Cheng Lidong
- Presented by: Cheng Lidong; Cui Changhong
- Starring: Fan Bingbing; Steve Ma; Liu Dekai; Zhou Jie; Eddie Kwan
- Opening theme: "Love" (爱) by Fan Zhuqing and Wang Yingzi
- Ending theme: "Investiture of the Gods (封神榜) by Zhou Peng; "Love of a Lifetime" (一世情) by Chen Guoning
- Country of origin: China
- Original language: Mandarin
- No. of episodes: 40

Production
- Executive producers: Zhou Zhengyuan; Li Guangming; Liu Guizhen; Li Xiaoli; Zou Xiaoli; Li Xiaoguo; Yu Wei
- Producers: Cheng Lidong; Yang Gui; Huang Weihong; Li Jinyuan; Yang Lingling; Yan Xiaoqin; Zhou Haiwen; Zhang Suzhou; Li Guangming; Yang Wenhu; Ding Hui; Li Yue; Duan Jianwu; Liang Zhixiang; Yan Aihua
- Production location: China
- Cinematography: Li Xinbo; Wang Xuguang
- Running time: ≈45 minutes per episode

Original release
- Network: Jilin Television
- Release: February 2007

Related
- The Legend and the Hero 2

The Legend and the Hero (封神榜之凤鸣岐山) is a 2007 Chinese shenmo television series adapted from the 16th-century novel Investiture of the Gods by Xu Zhonglin and Lu Xixing. It starred cast members from mainland China, Taiwan, Hong Kong, and Singapore. The series started airing on CCTV-8 in February 2007, while the sequel The Legend and the Hero 2 was released in 2009.

== Cast ==
- Fan Bingbing as Daji
- Steve Ma as Di Xin
- Zhou Jie as King Wu of Zhou
- Liu Dekai as Jiang Ziya
- Miao Haizhong as Shen Gongbao
- Tang Guoqiang as Yuanshi Tianzun
- Eddie Kwan as Bo Yikao
- Jin Qiaoqiao as Queen Jiang
- Xu Huanshan as Wen Zhong
- Liu Tao as Chang'e
- Wu Ma as Shang Rong
- Bonnie Xian as Nezha
  - Leo Wu as young Nezha
- Han Dong as Yang Jian
- Chen Ganlin as Jinzha
- Zhang Chao as Muzha
- Yang Long as Huang Tianhua
- Li Botun as Leizhenzi
- Tay Ping Hui as Huang Feihu
- Du Zhiguo as Su Hu
- Guo Kaimin as Bi Gan
- Lou Qi as Wu Ji
- Priscelia Chan as Zixian
- Han Zhi as Huang Feibao
- Xie Run as Nüwa
- Tian Jingshan as King Wen of Zhou
- Yao Yunshun as Fei Zhong
- Xu Ming as You Hun
- Li Yuan as E'lai
- Wu Jiani as Hu Ximei
- Yan Boya as Fenglai
- Mao Jian as San Yisheng
- Lü Shigang as Nangong Kuo
- Li Qingxiang as Tongtian Cult Master
- Cheng Lidong as Wenshu Guangfa Tianzun
- Xiao Bing as Nanji Xianweng
- Ding Yujia as White Crane Boy
- Zhu Feng as Yin Pobai
- Zhao Jintao as Yin Hong
- Ran Qiaoqun as Immortal Puxian
- Xu Jingyi as Juliusun
- Jin Youpeng as Guangchengzi
- Li Jun as Chijingzi
- Li Jianxin as Chong Houhu
- Feng Chunzhe as Consort Huang
- Yang Guang as Consort Yang
- Zhang Bojun as Li Jing
- Liu Wei as Yu Hua
- Liu Xiaohu as Su Quanzhong
- Xie Jiaqi as Zheng Lun
- Wang Xiaofeng as Yurong
- Xu Songzi as Lady Ma
- Zhou Yuefang as Queen Mother of the West
- Zhong Minghe as Huang Gun
- Su Mao as Zhang Guifang
- Lou Yajiang as Zhou Ji
- Zhou Zhong as Huang Ming
- Yu Jinsheng as Long Huan
- Cheng Dachun as Wu Qian
- Yi Kun as Ji Li
- Dong Meng as Yu Qing
- Wang Wensheng as Lu Xiong
- Laopi as Chong Heihu
- Sun Dahao as Chong Yingbiao
- Chen Longzhan as Immortal Du'e
- Du Hongjun as Welkin Lord Zhang
- Zhao Le as Zhao Gongming
- Wang Xinfen as Yunxiao
- Liu Shuzhen as Bixiao
- Liu Chaomei as Qiongxiao
- Shang Yisha as Holy Mother of Golden Light
- Liu Rongsheng as Welkin Lord Qin
- Zhao Enquan as Welkin Lord Zhao
- Shi Jipu as Welkin Lord Dong
- Dong Jie as Welkin Lord Yuan
- Wang Hongjun as Welkin Lord Sun
- Zhang Haiping as Welkin Lord Bai
- Jiao Changqiu as Welkin Lord Wang
- Chen Weiguo as Welkin Lord Yao
- Zhu Dongning as Chen Jiugong
- Guo Xirui as Daode Zhenjun
- Cui Zai as Yunzhongzi
- Zhu Jiazhen as Han Dulong
- Gong Zhixue as Xue E'hu
- Chen Jie as Lihuangshi
- Zhang Xueying as Caiyun

== See also ==
- Gods of Honour, a similar 2001 Hong Kong TV series.
