= Gods of Honour =

Hong Kong television series

- DVD cover art
- Also known as: Fung San Bong
- Chinese: 封神榜
- Jyutping: Fung1 San4 Bong2
- Genre: Chinese mythology, shenmo fantasy
- Based on: Investiture of the Gods by Xu Zhonglin and Lu Xixing
- Screenplay by: Cheung Wah-biu; Chu Keng-kei
- Starring: Benny Chan; Chin Kar-lok; Irene Wan; Michelle Ye; Dickson Lee; Yuen Wah; Kingdom Yuen; Winnie Yeung
- Theme music composer: Mou Si-chung
- Opening theme: Fung San (封神) performed by Benny Chan and Rain Lau
- Country of origin: Hong Kong
- Original language: Cantonese
- No. of episodes: 40

Production
- Producer: Lau Si-yu
- Production location: Hong Kong
- Editors: Cheung Wah-biu; Wong Wai-keung
- Running time: 45 minutes per episode
- Production company: TVB

Original release
- Network: TVB Jade
- Release: 23 July – 14 September 2001

Gods of Honour is a Hong Kong television series adapted from the 16th-century novel Fengshen Bang (also known as Investiture of the Gods or Creation of the Gods), a Chinese vernacular classic written by Xu Zhonglin and Lu Xixing. The series was first aired on TVB Jade in Hong Kong in 2001. It starred Benny Chan, Chin Kar-lok, Irene Wan, Michelle Ye, Dickson Lee, Yuen Wah, Kingdom Yuen and Winnie Yeung in the lead roles.

== Story ==
Since time immemorial, the history of China has seen many belligerent and licentious tyrants. King Zhou of the Shang dynasty was one of the most notorious tyrant. His tyranny triggered off an epic legend: King Wu of the Zhou dynasty overthrowing King Zhou of the Shang dynasty. In the fierce battle between good and evil, ancient China was gripped by paroxysms of rage and grief. Countless loyal and valiant warriors were sacrificed. Taking pity on the aggrieved mortals, the Celestial Realm laid the Rostrum of Gods of Honour.

The story tells a great number of filial piety as well. Important figures such as Nezha and Daji are mentioned.

== Cast ==
- Benny Chan as Na-tsa
- Chin Kar-lok as Yeung Jin
- Irene Wan as So Dan-kei
  - Maggie Wong as young So Dan-kei
- Michelle Ye as Yeung Lin-fa
- Dickson Lee as Lui-tsan-tsi
- Yuen Wah as Lei Ching
- Kingdom Yuen as Yan Sap-neung
- Winnie Yeung as Wong Ngan
- Angela Tong as Lau Pei-pa
- Chang Tse-sheng as King Tsau of Sheung
- Fiona Yuen as So Tsing-heung
- Law Lok-lam as Kei Cheung
- Marco Lo as Pak-yap Hau
- Deno Cheung as Kei Fat
- Yu Tze-ming as Keung Tsi-nga
- Lee Kwok-lun as San Kung-pau
- Wong Wai as So Wu
- Rain Lau as Tang Sin-yuk
- Wai Ka-hung as To-hang-suen
- Henry Lo as Pei Kon
- Ngo Ka-nin as Muk-tsa
- Tang Siu-chun as Kam-tsa
- Wong Wai-leung as Tang Kau-kung
- Law Lan as Yiu Tin-heung
- Lam Kei-yan as Lei Ngai-seung
- Kwan Ching as Mo Lai-ching
- Tang Yu-chiu as Mo Lai-hoi
- Cheng Ka-sang as Mo Lai-hong
- Chan Tik-hak as Mo Lai-shau
- Savio Tsang as Wong Fei-fu
- Chan On-ying as Tsui Yu-yuk
- Tam Kuen-fai as Wong Tin-fa
- Chan Min-leung as Hong Pak
- Tam Yat-ching as Tai-yut
- Choi Kwok-hing as Man Chung
- Kwok Tak-shun as Chiu Kung-ming
- Wong Tin-dok as Mui Pak
- Joe Junior as Chong Kung-kung
- Lau Sam-yee as Ko Chun-chung
- Fung Hiu-man as Nine-tailed Fox Spirit
- Chu Kin-kwan as Keung Wan
- Yau Piu as Yin Jiao
- Cheung Hak as Yan Hung
- Sherming Yiu as Concubine Yeung
- Tavia Yeung as Concubine Chan
- Fu Chor-wai as Concubine Lei
- Tsang Wai-wan as Chun-mui
- Tsang Sau-ming as Yim-lo
- Lee Hung-kit as Judge
- Wong Wai-tak as Chin-lei-ngan
- Leung Kin-ping as Shun-fung-yee
- Yu Muk-lin as Fung Po-po
- Che Pou-lor as Lui Sun
- Man Kit-wan as Tin Mo
- Wah Chung-nam as Chek Geok Tai Sin
- Yi Fan-wai as General Hung
- Yau Mang-shing as General Ha
- Cheung Ying-choi as Yeung Chun
- Lau Kwai-fong as Mrs Yeung
- Sun Kwai-hing as Teacher
- Kiu Hung as Host
- Siu Cheuk-yiu as Physician
- Ling Hon as Housekeeper

== See also ==
- The Legend and the Hero
- The Legend and the Hero 2
