= The Investiture of the Gods (2014 TV series) =

Chinese television series

- Also known as: The First Myth
- Genre: Epic fantasy, Chinese mythology, Gods and demons fiction
- Based on: Fengshen Yanyi
- Written by: Jerry Chien
- Directed by: Wang Weiting, Yang Jianwu
- Starring: Sammul Chan; Viann Zhang; Vular Jiang; Johnny Zhang
- Opening theme: Shenxian Dao by Zhang Zhuowen 《神仙道》
- Ending theme: Rain Fall down in Chang'an by Jin Lin 《雨落长安》
- Country of origin: China
- Original language: Mandarin
- No. of episodes: 50(TV)/75(DVD)

Production
- Executive producer: Jerry Chien
- Production location: Hengdian World Studios
- Production companies: Huace Film and Television Company

Original release
- Network: Shandong Television, Guizhou Television, Hubei Television
- Release: January 31 – February 18, 2014

Related
- The Investiture of the Gods 2

The Investiture of the Gods
- Traditional Chinese: 封神英雄榜
- Simplified Chinese: 封神英雄榜
Transcriptions
Standard Mandarin
- Hanyu Pinyin: Fēngshén Yīngxióngbǎng

The Investiture of the Gods is a Chinese shenmo television series directed by Wang Weiting and Yang Jianwu. The television series are based on the classical 16th-century novel Fengshen Yanyi (also known as Investiture of the Gods or Creation of the Gods) written by Xu Zhonglin and Lu Xixing.

The success of the series have led to a sequel Investiture of The Gods II which aired in 2015.

== Cast ==
- Sammul Chan as Jiang Ziya
- Viann Zhang as Daji
- Vular Jiang as Ma Zhaodi (Jiang Ziya's wife)
- Johnny Zhang as King Wu of Zhou
- Zhang Mingming as Shen Gongbao
- Andrew Wu as King Zhou of Shang
- Yin Yezi as Helan
- Zheng Yitong as Feng Qingqing
- Madina Memet as Wang Pan
- Zhang Zhuowen as Nezha
- Li Jinrong as Erlang Shen
- Zheng Pengfei as Leizhenzi
- Wang Jinduo as Wu Ji
- Zhou Danli as Niu Xiaomei
- Jian Yuanxin as King Wen of Zhou
- Yizhen Chen as Tai Si
- Li Huailong as Li Jing
- Tang Dehui as Yin Shiniang
- He Qiang as Wen Zhong
- Wang Xia as San Yisheng
- Sun Cong as Jinzha
- Lan Haoyu as Muzha
- Zhang Yongqi as Queen Jiang
- Hugo Goh Kwei Ann as Bigan
- Ji Xiaobing as Bo Yikao
- Chen Zhixi as Nüwa
- Liu Zhixi as Shiji Niangniang
- Liu Yuting as Cuiping
- Wang Jingluan as Fairy Flowers
- Kang Lei as Gao He
- Ge Xingyu as Tu Xingsun
- Hao Jinjin as Shuang'er
- Xing Qiqi as Fei Zhong
- Zhao Yang as You Hun

== Critical reception ==
The series became a popular broadcast on three major television networkings in Shandong, Guizhou, Hubei.
