= The Legend and the Hero 2 =

2009 Chinese TV series

- DVD cover art
- 封神榜之武王伐纣
- Genre: Shenmo
- Based on: Investiture of the Gods by Xu Zhonglin and Lu Xixing
- Directed by: Cheng Lidong
- Starring: Liu Dekai; Victor Huang; Ruby Lin; Ray Lui; Wang Like
- Opening theme: "Love" (爱) by Fan Zhuqing and Wang Yingzi
- Ending theme: "Investiture of the Gods (封神榜) by Zhou Peng; "Love of a Lifetime" (一世情) by Chen Guoning
- Country of origin: China
- Original language: Mandarin
- No. of episodes: 40

Production
- Executive producers: Li Zhanying; Zhang Ning; Lu Haibo; Li Wansen
- Producer: Cheng Lidong
- Production location: China
- Cinematography: Li Xinbo; Wang Xuguang
- Running time: ≈45 minutes per episode

Original release
- Network: TTV
- Release: 14 September – 13 October 2009

Related
- The Legend and the Hero

The Legend and the Hero 2 (封神榜之武王伐纣) is a 2009 shenmo television series adapted from the 16th-century novel Investiture of the Gods by Xu Zhonglin. It starred cast members from mainland China, Taiwan, Hong Kong, and Singapore. The series was first broadcast on TTV from September to October 2009, and was preceded by The Legend and the Hero in 2007.

== Cast ==
- Victor Huang as King Wu of Zhou
- Ray Lui as King Zhou of Shang
- Ruby Lin as Daji
- Liu Dekai as Jiang Ziya
- Miao Haizhong as Shen Gongbao
- Ix Shen as Huang Feihu
- Bonnie Xian as Nezha
- Han Dong as Yang Jian
- Wang Like as Ziyu
- Yan Boya as Fenglai
- Tang Guoqiang as Yuanshi Tianzun
- Yang Long as Huang Tianhua
- Du Zhiguo as Su Hu
- Ding Ting as Jinzha
- Yang Chen as Muzha
- Qi Fang as Deng Chanyu
- Cheng Yalin as Tuxingsun
- Lou Qi as Wu Ji
- Yang Bo as Huang Tianxiang
- Yao Yunshun as Tongtian Jiaozhu
- Mou Fengbin as Kong Xuan
- Li Zixuan as Leizhenzi
- Li Xinling as Guanghan Fairy
- Lu Yujie as Princess Longji
- Pierre Png as Hong Jin
- Huang Jingjun as Guangchengzi
- Li Jun as Chijingzi
- Xu Jingyi as Juliusun
- Zhu Jiazhen as Yang Ren
- Xie Jiaqi as Zheng Lun
- He Lei as Yunzhongzi
- Xu Jiamin as Taishang Laojun
- Chi Sheze as Immortal Puxian
- Luo Shunming as Taoist Zhunti
- Luo Yongheng as Immortal Taiyi
- Wu Lihua as Qingxu Daode
- Sun Wanqing as Taoist Jieyin
- Guo Ye as Immortal Cihang
- Li Jianchang as Immortal Huanglong
- Jiao Changdao as Immortal Jinguang
- Wu Xiangqi as Holy Mother of Golden Spirit
- Chen Qiufang as Holy Mother of Wudang
- Yu Yang as Immortal Kunlu
- Jiang Bozhou as Wei Hu
- Zhu Yanfei as Nangong Shi
- Xie Lin as Master Yiqi
- Zhang Jiajun as Taoist Duobao
- Cheng Lidong as Wenshu Chufa

== See also ==
- Gods of Honour, a similar 2001 Hong Kong TV series
- The Legend and the Hero
