= Jiutou Zhiji Jing =

Figure in Chinese mythology

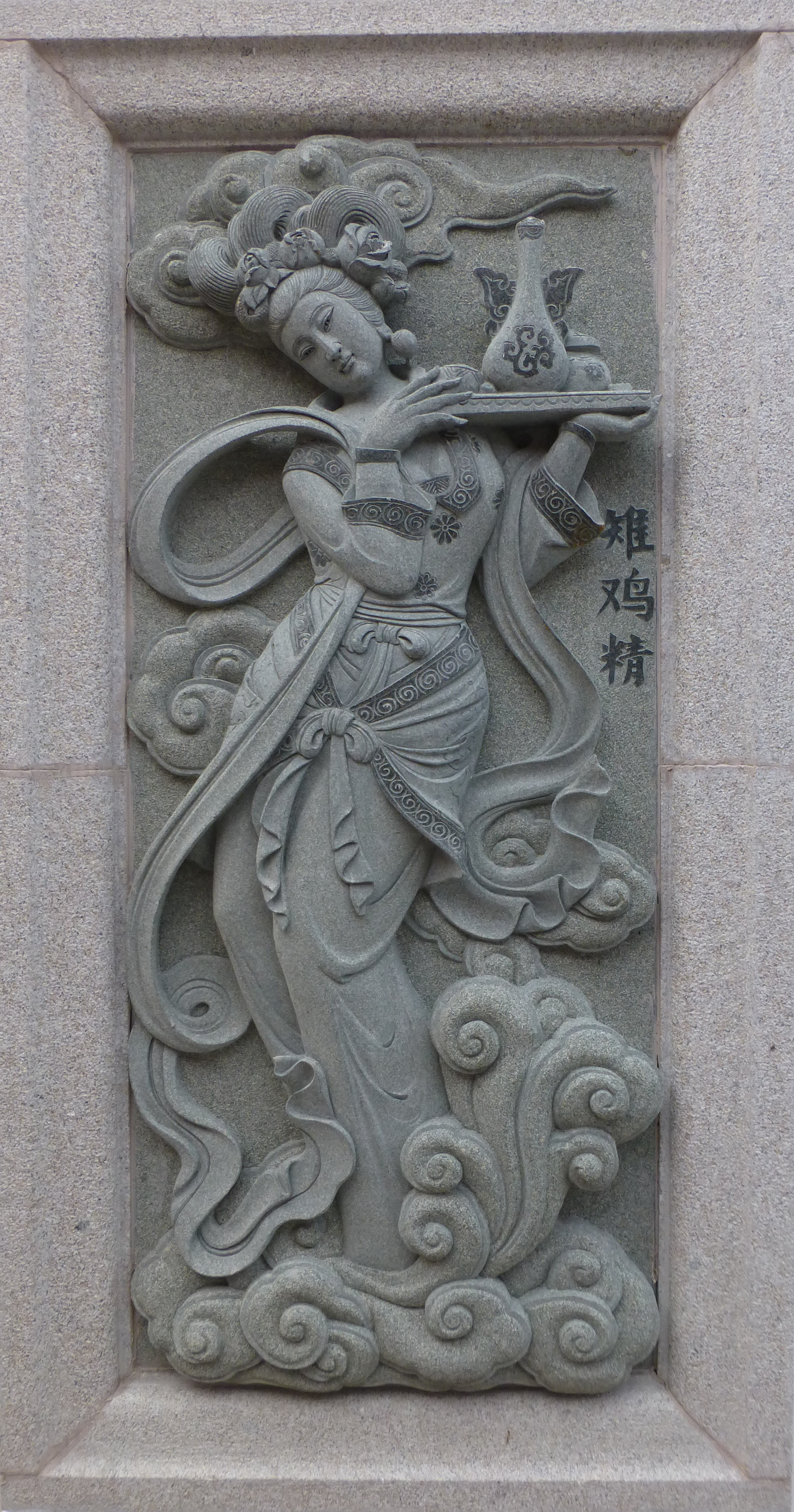
Zhiji Jing with a pheasant's head

Jiutou Zhiji Jing (simplified Chinese: 九头雉鸡精; traditional Chinese: 九頭雉鷄精; pinyin: Jiǔtóu Zhìjī Jīng; roughly Nine-Headed Pheasant Spirit), or Hu Ximei (Chinese: 胡喜媚; pinyin: Hú Xǐmèi; roughly Splendor), is a yaojing, changed from a pheasant with nine heads. She is a character from the famed classic Chinese novel Investiture of the Gods.

Like both Pipa Jing and Daji, Zhiji Jing is one of three specters under Nu Wa. In appearance, Zhiji Jing wore a large red robe, a silk sash around her slim waist, and small red linen shoes. She also possessed beautiful eyes as an autumn lake. Zhiji Jing would first appear when Daji headed to the tomb of the Yellow Emperor to retrieve her along with her other fox cohorts.

Daji intended to bring her friends to a banquet disguised as heavenly maidens to trick the king. Once the true forms of Zhiji Jing and her allies were revealed to Vice Prime Minister Bi Gan, and each specter returned to their original form, Huang Feihu set out and lit their home on fire, which killed every specter except Splendor herself. Following this event, Daji returned to the tomb of the Yellow Emperor and found her sister Zhiji Jing as the only survivor. However, she would head back to Zhaoge with Daji disguised as an even more beautiful woman. While disguised as a woman, Zhiji Jing would play along with her sister's scheme by spending some personal time with King Zhou. Shortly after, Zhiji Jing decided to stay with the king at Zhaoge instead of living in the mountains as previously.

She would continue to enjoy palace life and drown herself with luxurious wine. Near the end of the novel, she tried to flee Zhaoge's destruction with her sisters but was captured by Jiang Ziya's men. She was executed by Erlang Shen.

Her origin is said to be derived from the mythical Nine-headed bird.
