= Huang Gun =

Fictional character from Investiture of the Gods

Huang Gun (Chinese: 黄滚; pinyin: Huáng Gǔn) is a fictional character in the Chinese novel Investiture of the Gods (Fengshen Yanyi). He is the father of the military commander Huang Feihu and a general of the Shang dynasty who commands Jiepai Pass (界牌关).

== Role in the novel ==
Huang Gun commands Jiepai Pass during the rebellion of his son, Huang Feihu. Before Huang Feihu leaves Chaoge, he is described as a veteran general who has guarded the pass and trained soldiers for the Shang court.

When Huang Feihu leaves Chaoge after the deaths of his wife and sister, Huang Gun learns that his son is approaching Jiepai Pass. He orders 3,000 soldiers to prepare for battle and has ten prisoner carts made to capture the members of Huang Feihu's group and return them to Chaoge.

When Huang Feihu meets him at the pass, Huang Gun refuses to let him proceed. He reminds his son that the Huang family has served the Shang dynasty for seven generations and accuses him of betraying his ruler and neglecting his filial duty. Huang Gun tells Huang Feihu that he must either return with him to Chaoge as a loyal and filial son or leave him to continue westward.

Huang Ming argues that King Zhou has become a tyrannical ruler and that a minister is not required to obey an unjust sovereign. Huang Gun rejects this argument and attacks Huang Ming, continuing to defend his family's loyalty to the Shang. Huang Feihu nevertheless follows Huang Ming and the others rather than returning to Chaoge.

Huang Gun is then persuaded to leave Jiepai Pass with Huang Feihu's group. After the grain stores and supplies at the pass are burned, he realizes that he has been deceived into leaving his post. He nevertheless continues toward Sishui Pass, where he expects that he and his family will be captured. He gives up his military seals and formally leaves Jiepai Pass with his retainers and family members.

At Sishui Pass, Huang Gun learns that several members of his family have been captured. He goes personally to Han Rong and asks him to spare his seven-year-old grandson, Huang Tianjue, so that the Huang family line will survive. Huang Gun again refers to the family's seven generations of service to the Shang and accepts responsibility for his son's actions.

Huang Gun later continues with the Zhou forces. Near the end of the novel, he is among the officials who meet King Wu of Zhou after the Zhou conquest. He appears with his grandson Huang Tianjue during the return to Xiqi.

== Characterization ==
Huang Gun's conflict with his son Huang Feihu has been discussed in terms of the father–son relationships depicted in Investiture of the Gods. A 2025 article in The Paper describes Huang Gun as 愚忠 (blindly loyal) for insisting on taking Huang Feihu back to Chaoge despite the circumstances of his defection.

== Worship ==
Huang Gun is worshipped in Chinese folk religion as a deity. There is a temple in Shanxi where his son Huang Feihu was worshipped as Dongyue Dadi. Huang Gun was also enshrined at the temple.
