= Wen Zhong (Investiture of the Gods) =

Character in Fengshen Yanyi

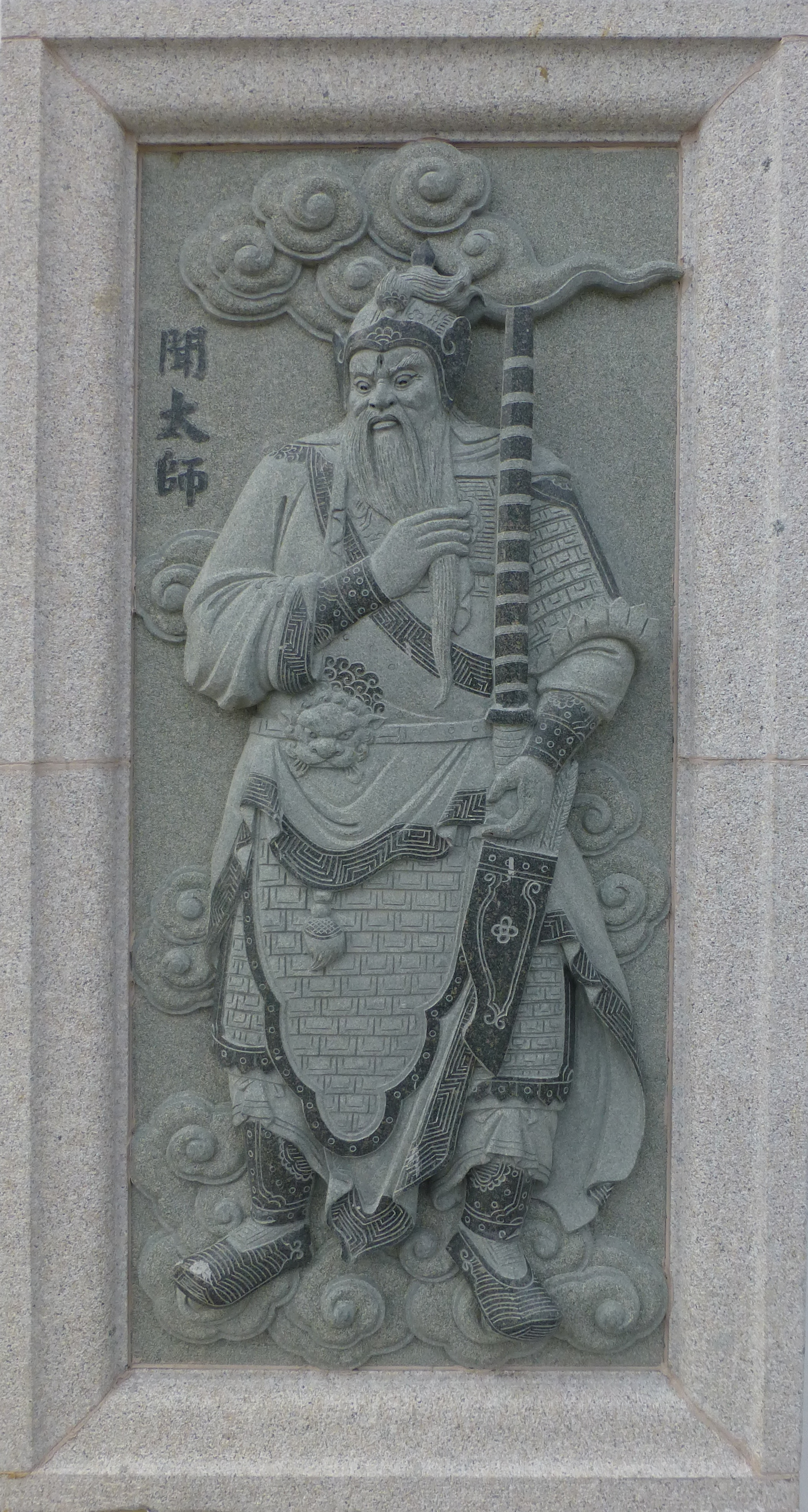
Wen Zhong

Wen Zhong (Chinese: 闻仲; pinyin: Wén Zhòng) is a character in the classic Chinese novel Fengshen Yanyi. He is the Grand Preceptor (Taishi) of Di Xin, the king of Shang.

== In Fengshen Yanyi ==
Wen Zhong first appears in the opening chapter of the novel. As a young man, he studied under Jinling Shengmu at Biyou Palace, the headquarters of the Jie sect. He is depicted with a third eye on his forehead. Wen Zhong rides Mo Qilin (墨麒麟), a flying qilin, and carries a pair of Jiaolong Golden Whips (蛟龙金鞭), which are described as having been transformed from two dragons.

Wen Zhong serves at the Shang court under King Di Yi. After Di Yi's death, he helps place Zi Shou on the throne. He is frequently sent on military campaigns and spends much of his time away from the capital.

In the first chapter, Wen Zhong leaves for the North Sea to suppress a rebellion led by Yuan Futong, one of the seventy-two marquises. He does not return to the capital until chapter 27. By then, Daji has gained influence over King Zhou, and several officials have been executed after opposing the king. Wen Zhong criticizes the state of the court and submits ten proposals for the government.

The ten proposals call for the demolition of Lutai, abolition of the paolao punishment, filling the chiyu prison, ending the wine pool and meat forest, demoting Daji, executing the ministers Fei Zhong and You Hun, opening the state granaries to relieve famine, sending envoys to pacify the southeastern territories, seeking capable officials, and accepting remonstrance. King Zhou accepts some of the proposals but refuses to immediately carry out the measures against Fei Zhong and You Hun. Wen Zhong then leaves on another military campaign.

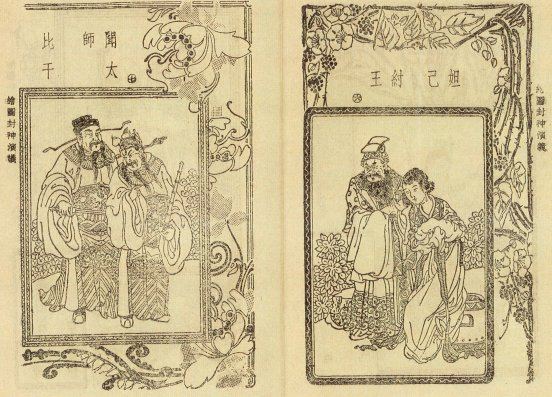
Left: Wen Zhong and Bi Gan; right: King Zhou and Daji

After returning from the campaign, Wen Zhong learns that Huang Feihu has defected from Shang to Xiqi. He pursues Huang Feihu and orders the passes along his route to be guarded. Huang Feihu escapes with assistance from Qingxu Daode Zhenjun and eventually reaches Xiqi.

Wen Zhong then prepares for a campaign against Xiqi. In chapter 41, he personally leads the Shang army and recruits several allies. He first takes four generals from Huanghua Mountain—Deng Zhong, Xin Huan, Zhang Jie, and Tao Rong—as his subordinates. He later seeks assistance from the Ten Heavenly Kings, Zhao Gongming, and the three sisters of Sanxiao Palace, all associated with the Jie sect.

Wen Zhong's campaign against Xiqi continues through several battles and formations. After repeated defeats, he retreats with his remaining forces. In chapter 52, he is pursued to Juelong Ridge, where Yunzhongzi confronts him. Yunzhongzi uses eight divine fire pillars to trap Wen Zhong. Wen Zhong is killed in the flames, and his spirit is taken to the Fengshen Altar.

After his death, Wen Zhong's spirit appears to King Zhou in a dream and urges him to practice benevolent government, seek capable ministers, avoid excess and corruption, and respect the Shang ancestral state and the will of Heaven.

At the end of the novel, Jiang Ziya appoints Wen Zhong Jiutian Yingyuan Leisheng Puhua Tianzun (九天應元雷聲普化天尊). The investiture decree states that Wen Zhong had served two Shang kings and had held the highest ministerial rank. It appoints him to oversee the Thunder Department, with responsibility for bringing clouds and rain, nurturing living things, and punishing rebels and wrongdoers. He is placed in command of 24 Thunder Department Heavenly Lords.

== Religious traditions ==
In Investiture of the Gods, Wen Zhong becomes Jiutian Yingyuan Leisheng Puhua Tianzun (九天應元雷聲普化天尊), also known as Lei Zu (雷祖). He rules the Thunder Department and commands 24 thunder gods. The god was worshipped in Daoism before the novel was written. Other traditions identify him with the Jade Pure King (玉清真王) or the Yellow Emperor.

== In opera ==
Wen Zhong is the main character in the Peking opera Taishi Huichao (太师回朝), also called Da Huichao (大回朝) or Chen Shice (陈十策). After returning from a military campaign in the North Sea, he learns that several officials and members of the royal family have died. He becomes angry with King Zhou and his ministers, Fei Zhong and You Hun. He also presents ten proposals to improve the government.

== Interpretations ==
Yoo Su-min compares Wen Zhong's death and his appointment as a god with haewon (解冤), the Korean idea of resolving grievances. She sees his appointment as a way of honoring the defeated heroes of Shang. Yoo also links Wen Zhong's three-eyed appearance and his role as a thunder god to Korean religious traditions. She argues that the name Wen Taishi (聞太師), used for the author of the Daoist scripture Yushujing (玉樞經) in Joseon Korea, came from the popularity of Fengshen Yanyi.

== Bibliography ==
- Investiture of the Gods, chapters 27, 52 and 99
