= Yunzhongzi =

Character in the Chinese novel Fengshen Yanyi

Yunzhongzi (Chinese: 雲中子; pinyin: Yúnzhōngzǐ) is a Daoist immortal in the Chinese novel Fengshen Yanyi. He lives at Jade Pillar Cave (玉柱洞) on Mount Zhongnan (終南山) and is the teacher of Leizhenzi.

== Role in the novel ==
Yunzhongzi first appears after Daji enters the court of King Zhou of Shang. He knows that Daji is a fox spirit and visits the king to warn him. He gives the king a wooden sword to drive away the spirit. The sword makes Daji ill, but she persuades the king to remove it.

Yunzhongzi later takes Leizhenzi as his disciple and raises him at Mount Zhongnan. He gives Leizhenzi two magical apricots, which cause him to grow wings and gain great strength. He then sends Leizhenzi to rescue Ji Chang and later to help the Zhou army.

Yunzhongzi also helps the Zhou army against Wen Zhong. At Juelong Ridge, he traps Wen Zhong with eight Divine Fire Pillars (通天神火柱) and uses Randeng Daoren's Purple Gold Bowl to stop him from escaping.

When Jiang Ziya faces Lü Yue's Plague Formation, Yunzhongzi gives him protective talismans and a pill. He also takes charge of the army while Jiang Ziya is trapped in the formation.

Yunzhongzi later joins the battle at the Ten Thousand Immortals Formation.

== Interpretations ==
Yunzhongzi is not one of the Twelve Golden Immortals. Japanese researcher Satoshi Ninomiya notes that he avoids the battles at the Ten Absolute Formations and the Yellow River Formation, but later defeats Wen Zhong. Randeng calls him an immortal of good fortune (福德之仙).

== Temple art ==
A painting at Fengqi Temple (奉祈宮) in Tuku, Taiwan, shows Yunzhongzi giving a wooden sword to King Zhou. The scene comes from Fengshen Yanyi.
