= Investiture of the Gods =

16th-century Chinese novel

Fengshen Yanyi
- Cover of the Investiture of the Gods, book two, from the Harvard University's rare books collection
- Author: Xu Zhonglin; Lu Xixing
- Original title: 封神演義
- Language: Chinese
- Genre: Chinese mythology, shenmo, fantasy, historical fiction
- Publication date: 16th century
- Publication place: China
- Media type: Print

Investiture of the Gods
- Traditional Chinese: 封神演義
- Simplified Chinese: 封神演义
- Literal meaning: The Romance of the Investiture of the Gods
Transcriptions
Standard Mandarin
- Hanyu Pinyin: Fēngshén Yǎnyì
- Wade–Giles: Fêng^{1}-shên^{2} Yan^{3}-yi^{4}
- Yale Romanization: Fēng-Shén Yǎn-Yì
Yue: Cantonese
- Jyutping: Fung^{1} San^{4} Jin^{2} Ji^{6}

Alternative Chinese name
- Traditional Chinese: 封神榜
- Simplified Chinese: 封神榜
- Literal meaning: The Name List of the Investiture of the Gods
Transcriptions
Standard Mandarin
- Hanyu Pinyin: Fēngshén Bǎng
- Wade–Giles: Fêng^{1}-shên^{2} Pang^{3}
- Yale Romanization: Fēng-Shén Bǎng
Yue: Cantonese
- Jyutping: Fung1 San4 Bong2

The Investiture of the Gods, also known by its Chinese titles Fengshen Yanyi (Chinese: 封神演義; pinyin: Fēngshén Yǎnyì; Wade–Giles: Fêng^{1}-shên^{2} Yan^{3}-yi^{4}; Jyutping: Fung^{1} San^{4} Jin^{2} Ji^{6}) and Fengshen Bang (封神榜), (Note: Less common translations of the title include The Canonisation of the Gods.) is a 16th-century Chinese novel and one of the major vernacular Chinese works in the gods and demons (shenmo) genre written during the Ming dynasty (1368–1644). Consisting of 100 chapters, it was first published in book form between 1567 and 1619. Another source claims it was published in a finalized edition in 1605. The work combines elements of history, folklore, mythology, legends and fantasy.

The story is set in the era of the decline of the Shang dynasty (1600–1046 BC) and the rise of the Zhou dynasty (1046–256 BC). It intertwines numerous elements of Chinese mythology, Chinese folk religion, Chinese Buddhism, Confucianism, and Taoism, including deities, demons, immortals and spirits. The authorship is attributed to Xu Zhonglin.

The Investiture of the Gods is generally regarded as one of the most important works of Chinese gods-and-demons fiction (shenmo xiaoshuo), comparable in status to Journey to the West. Because of its large cast of gods and immortals and its combination of mythology with the historical fall of the Shang dynasty and the rise of the Zhou dynasty, it has become one of the most significant mythical literary works of the Chinese people.

== Plot ==
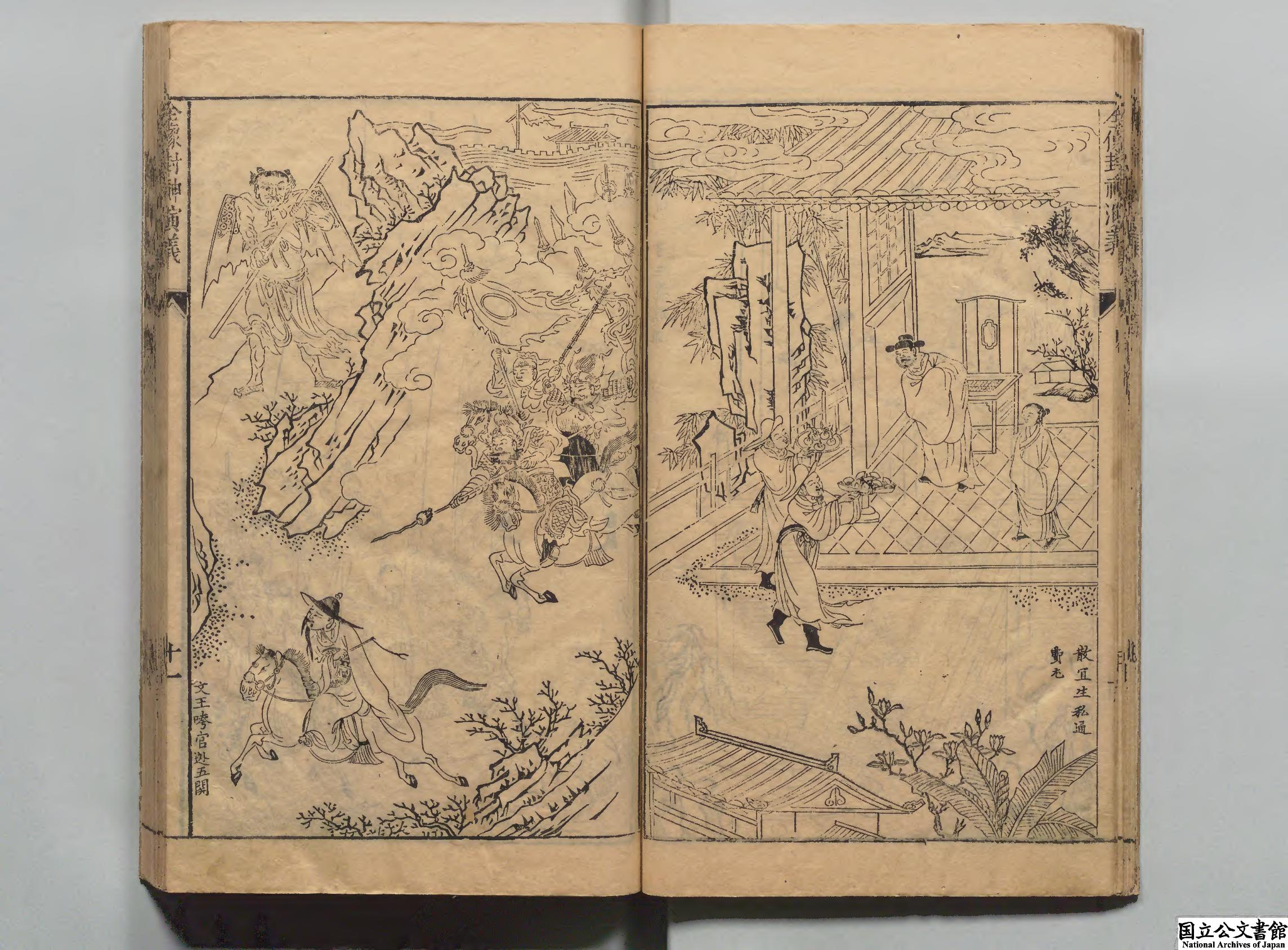
Illustrations of Fengshen Yanyi from an edition of the novel featuring commentary by Zhong Xing (1574–1625) (book one)

The novel is a romanticised retelling of the overthrow of Di Xin, the last ruler of the Shang dynasty, by Ji Fa, who would establish the Zhou dynasty in its place. The story integrates oral and written tales of many Chinese mythological figures who are involved in the struggle as well. These figures include human heroes, immortals, and various spirits (usually represented in avatar form, such as vixens and pheasants, and occasionally as inanimate objects such as a pipa).

Bewitched by his concubine Daji, who is actually a vixen spirit disguised as a beautiful woman, Di Xin oppresses his people and persecutes those who oppose him, including those who dare to speak up to him. Ji Fa (King Wu of Zhou), assisted by his strategist Jiang Ziya, rallies an army to overthrow the tyrant and restore peace and order. Throughout the story, battles are waged between the kingdoms of Shang and Zhou, with both sides calling upon various supernatural beings – deities, immortals, demons, spirits, and humans with magical abilities – to aid them in the war. Yuanshi Tianzun ("Primeval Lord of Heaven") bestows upon Jiang Ziya the Fengshen bang, a list that empowers him to invest the gods of Heaven. The heroes of Zhou and some of their fallen enemies from Shang are eventually endowed with heavenly ranking and essentially elevated as gods, hence the title of the novel.

== Detailed Summary ==
=== Background ===
The world is divided into the "immortal world" and the "human world". The founder of Taoism, Hongjun Laozu has 3 disciples, Taishang Laojun, Yuanshi Tianzun and Tongtian Jiaozhu . Taishang Laojun founded Taoism; Taoist priests and immortals of human origin belong to the Chan Sect, practicing on Mount Kunlun with Yuanshi Tianzun as the leader; except for a few humans, many animals and plants join the Jie Sect after being trained and become spirits, and worship Tongtian Jiaozhu as the master. Although both Chan Sect and Jie Sect belong to the disciples of Hongjun Laozu, Chan Sect believes that the disciples of Jie Sect are not upright, so the 2 sects are opposed to each other. There is a saying that "1 way is passed on to 3 friends, and the 2 sects are divided into Chan and Jie". There is also a Western sect that alludes to the predecessor of Buddhism. The setting is China in the 12th century BC. At that time, the Shang Dynasty that ruled China was in decline. The last monarch, Di Xin wrote a poem to tease Nuwa. The angry Nuwa sent a millennium-old fox spirit, a jade pipa spirit, and a 9-headed pheasant spirit into the palace to seduce Di Xin and destroy the Shang Dynasty. The fox spirit transformed into Su Daji, the daughter of Jizhou Hou Su Hu and lived a life of pleasure with Di Xin, corrupting the state system. As a result, Xibo Hou Jichang, who rebelled against the Shang Dynasty, led the people to fight against the Shang Dynasty and eventually established a new dynasty: the Zhou Dynasty . On the other hand, the immortal world was facing a killing calamity that occurred once every 1500 years [the urge to kill in the immortal's heart] and had to kill to survive this calamity. Taking advantage of the chaos in the mortal world, the immortal world also started killing. For this reason, the 3 religions jointly established the "List". There were 365 names on this list, recording the people, immortals, Taoists or demons who would be canonized as gods so that those who met the conditions would be canonized as gods. The protagonist, Jiang Ziya is a Taoist priest from Mount Kunlun who was given the mission by heaven to assist King Wen and King Wu of Zhou in defeating Di Xin and carry out the deification.

=== Su Daji Enters the Palace ===
At the end of the Shang Dynasty, Di Xin was in power. On the birthday of Nüwa, Di Xin led all officials to Nuwa Palace to pay homage. Seeing the beautiful statue of Nuwa, he wrote a poem. After returning to the palace, Nuwa was very angry to see Di Xin's poem insulting her. She summoned the millennium-old fox spirit, the jade pipa spirit, and the 9-headed pheasant spirit from Xuanyuan Tomb, and ordered the 3 demons to confuse the king and ruin the country. The millennium-old fox spirit killed Su Daji, the daughter of Jizhou Hou Su Hu, and transformed into her to enter the palace to seduce Di Xin, making him addicted to alcohol, fornication, and the people suffered. Although the Qigong master Yun Zhongzi, Queen Jiang, and loyal ministers such as Shang Rong and Mei Bo advised Di Xin because of Daji's evil words, the 2 treacherous ministers Fei Zhong and You Hun added fuel to the fire, Mei Bo was executed by burning Huang Feihu to begin to disobey Di Xin's will, also forced the 2 princes Yin Jiao and Yin Hong to escape from the palace, and then they were taken back to the mountains by Chi Jingzi and Guang Chengzi, 2 of the 12 Immortals to be accepted as apprentices. But Di Xin did not give up. He listened to Fei Zhong's advice and tricked the 4 princes into the capital, intending to wipe out the roots. Dongbo Hou Jiang Huanchu and Nambo Hou E Chongyu died as a result while Xibo Hou Ji Chang escaped death by fortune-telling. This section also introduces Ji Chang's 100th son Lei Zhenzi who was born after the wind, thunder, adopted by Ji Chang as his adopted son, then taken away by Yun Zhongzi, and accepted as his apprentice.

=== The Birth of Nezha ===
Nezha is the 3rd son of Li Jing, the general of Chentangguan. He is the reincarnation of Taiyi Zhenren's magic weapon Lingzhuzi. He was born wearing magic weapons and was accepted as a disciple by Taiyi Zhenren. When Nezha was 7 years old, he played in the water at the mouth of the East China Sea and killed Li Gen, a subordinate of Dragon King Ao Guang, and Prince Ao Bing that made Li Jing very dissatisfied. Nezha did not want to implicate his parents, so he cut open his abdomen and removed his intestines to redeem himself. Yin was worried that Nezha's soul would have no place to rest so she built a palace for Nezha without telling Li Jing. When Li Jing learned about it, he burned the palace in anger, and Nezha had to go back to find his master. Taiyi Zhenren asked Nezha to be reborn with the lotus as a proof and taught him many magic weapons. Nezha then returned to Chentangguan to kill Li Jing but was subdued by Li Jing with the pagoda taught by the Taoist Master Ran Deng. After the father and son reconciled, they practiced with their respective masters and later assisted Jiang Ziya in battle.

=== Jiang Ziya Descends the Mountain ===
Jiang Ziya went to the mountains to learn Taoism at the age of 32. Although he practiced Taoism for 40 years, he did not have the talent to become an immortal and could only enjoy the blessings of the world. His master Yuanshi Tianzun asked him to descend the mountain to be deified and assist the wise master. After descending the mountain, Jiang Shang took refuge with his sworn brother Song Yiren, married Ma, and started selling sieves and flour but all failed to make business. Song Yiren knew that Jiang Ziya understood Feng Shui so he asked him to open a fortune-telling shop. Jiang Ziya was as good as a god and his name made a sensation in Chaoge. He also saw through the original form of the Jade Pipa Fairy so Di Xin appointed him as the Imperial Observatory. Seeing her sister suffering, Daji made it for Jiang Ziya to build a gordifficultgeous high platform "Lutai" but in fact she wanted to kill him. After Jiang Ziya escaped by water escape, Chonghouhu took over the job. When Ma knew that her husband resigned from office, she blamed him for being useless and the 2 divorced. When Jiang Ziya left Songjiazhuang, he met people who were fleeing because they did not want to build the Lu Tower. He used earth escape to send them to Xiqi for refuge. Daji placed the pipa on the Zhaixing Tower to absorb the essence of the sun and the moon and she transformed into a beautiful noblewoman after 5 years and entered the palace to seduce Di Xin. In addition to the Lu Tower, Daji also built a scorpion pot, a wine pool and a meat forest, forcing the loyal minister Jiao Ge to commit suicide after admonishing the king, and Yang Ren had his eyes gouged out. Afterwards, Qingxu Daode Zhenjun revived Yang Ren and ordered him to assist Di Xin.

=== Flying Bear Enters the Dream ===
Ji Chang had spent 7 years in prison. His eldest son, Bo Yikao, planned to pay tribute to his father with his ancestral treasures to atone for his father's sins. Seeing that Bo Yikao was young and handsome, Daji could not keep him, so she lied that Bo Yikao had molested her. Bo Yikao could no longer bear it and tried to kill the king. After failing, Daji chopped him into meat sauce and tricked Ji Chang into eating it. Ji Chang, who was proficient in Yishu, knew that the food on the plate was his son's meat, but disobeying orders would bring about a disaster, so he had to eat his son reluctantly. When Ji Chang's second son, Ji Fa, learned about it, he bribed Fei Zhong and You Hun according to San Yisheng's plan and asked them to say a few good words to Di Xin, and he released Ji Chang. Ji Chang's escape was exposed, and Di Xin sent Yin Pobai and Lei Kai to lead troops to capture the escaped official. Yun Zhongzi ordered Lei Zhenzi to go down the mountain to help his father, and Lei Zhenzi easily scared off Yin and Lei's troops. Ji Chang returned to Xiqi and vomited 3 rabbits when he thought of Bo Yikao . ["Rabbit" is a homophone of "Tuzi", and the 3 rabbits represent the 3 souls of Bo Yikao.] Later Ji Chang wanted to build a "Lingtai" to predict the weather and disasters. On the night after the Lingtai was built, Ji Chang dreamed of a flying bear. San Yisheng told Ji Chang that this was a sign that Zhou would prosper. This is the origin of the idiom "flying bear enters the dream".

=== Jiang Taigong fishing ===
After abandoning Chaoge, Jiang Ziya fished with a needle in the Wei River . The woodcutter Wu Ji laughed at him for fishing with a needle but Jiang Ziya said he was fishing for the princes and that Wu Ji would kill people. Wu Ji didn't believe it at first but when he went to Xiqi to sell firewood, he accidentally killed Wang Xiang and was about to be executed. However, after he became Jiang Ziya's disciple, Jiang Ziya taught him a way to save his life and he escaped death. Time passes rapidly. One day, King Wen led his civil and military officials to the southern suburbs for fun. They heard Wu Ji's singing and learned about Jiang Ziya from him. King Wen believed that Jiang Ziya must be the flying bear in his dream, so he hired Jiang Ziya as the prime minister of Youlingtai [those who are willing will take the bait]. King Wen personally pulled Jiang Ziya's cart for more than 800 steps, and Jiang Ziya calculated that the Zhou Dynasty could last for 8 centuries. Afterwards, Jiang Ziya governed the country well and had laws to pacify the people. The people of Xiqi lived and worked in peace.

=== The Heart of Bi Gan Cut Out ===
Inside the pages of the Zhong Xing printed edition of the novel (book one)

Di Xin and Daji came to the completed Lutai. In order to win the trust of Di Xin, Daji went back to Xuanyuan Tomb and asked the foxes to transform into gods on the night of the full moon to create the feeling that the gods had descended on Lutai. Di Xin was delighted to see the gods descend, but Bigan, who was accompanying him, felt that the fox was smelly and unbearable, so he told Huang Feihu about it. Huang Feihu ordered his servants to follow the fox spirit back to the nest and then set fire to the fox den. Bigan peeled the fox skin and made it into a coat to present to Di Xin. This made Daji very angry, so she pretended to be sick and wanted to eat the rare heart "Linglong Heart" to cure her illness. She also asked the 9-headed pheasant spirit to transform into her sister Hu Ximei. Ximei told Di Xin that only Bigan had Linglong Heart in the palace. Knowing that he was about to die, Bigan remembered the note that Jiang Ziya had given him before, and drank the talisman water according to the content to protect his 5 internal organs. After the heart was removed from the body by laparotomy, Bigan left the Meridian Gate and heard an old woman selling heartless vegetables. He asked her, “What if a person has no heart?” The old woman replied, “If a person has no heart, he will die.” Upon hearing this, Bigan bled to death.

=== King Wucheng rebels ===
Wen Zhong was the Grand Master of Di Xin. He had been on an expedition to the North Sea for many years . When he returned, he saw that Di Xin was addicted to wine and women, so he ordered the destruction of the fire irons, wine pools and scorpion pots, and then set off to the East Sea to quell the rebellion. After the Grand Master left, Di Xin relapsed. On the other hand, Jiang Ziya sent Nangong Shi to lead troops to Chongcheng to fight, and finally captured Hou Hu and his son, but Ji Chang was in a trance after seeing Hou Hu's head, and died soon after. He was later posthumously named King Wen of Zhou. Jiang Ziya established Ji Fa as King Wu. On New Year's Day, Huang Feihu's first wife Jia came to the palace to pay tribute. Because it was against etiquette for the king to see the minister's wife, and Daji had a grudge against Huang Feihu, she designed to let Di Xin come. Seeing Jia's graceful appearance, Di Xin flirted with her. Jia could not bear the humiliation and jumped off the Zhaixing Tower to commit suicide. Concubine Huang of the West Palace is the sister of Huang Feihu. After hearing that her sister-in-law was killed by Daji, she beat Daji and Di Xin several times, and was thrown off the building by Di Xin and died. Huang Feihu decided to rebel after hearing the news. Wen Taishi returned from the East China Sea and sent troops to chase Huang Feihu after hearing about this. Feihu and others were blocked by Chen Tong, Chen Wu, Huang Gun, Han Rong, Yu Hua and other soldiers. Fortunately, Qingxu Daode Zhenjun sent Huang Feihu's eldest son Huang Tianhua down the mountain to save his father, and Jia also appeared to save Feihu. The generals of the Huang family finally surrendered to Xiqi, and King Wu of Zhou named him the founding king of Wucheng.

=== The Four Saints of Jiulong Island and the Four Generals of the Demon Family ===
Wen Taishi sent Chao Tian, Chao Lei, Feng Lin, Zhang Guifang, and many other generals to attack but they all failed to win. Jiang Ziya was worried that Chaoge would send a large number of troops again so he went to Kunlun to ask for reinforcements but he was careless for a while and deceived by his junior brother Shen Gongbao. He almost burned the Conferred God List and surrendered to Shang to destroy Zhou. Fortunately, the Nanji Immortal helped to keep the Conferred God List safe. Before leaving, Shen Gongbao made a bold statement that he would turn Xiqi into a sea of blood. After that, Jiang Ziya went to the East China Sea to recruit Xuanyuan General Bai Jian and asked him to supervise the construction of the Conferred God Platform in Qishan. Wen Taishi invited the 4 Saints of Jiulong Island to help. The 4 mounts were all strange beasts. Jiang Ziya's ordinary horse was frightened and paralysed so he had to go to Kunlun Mountain again. Yuanshi Tianzun gave the 4 Unspeakables to Jiang Ziya as a mount and gave him the Divine Whip as a weapon. Afterwards, the 4 Saints of Jiulong Island and Feng Lin were killed. Zhang Guifang knowing that he could not win, shot himself. Wen Taishi sent Lu Xiong, Fei Zhong, and You Hun to the battle but all 3 were frozen to death by Jiang Ziya. Wen Taishi sent the 4 generals of the Demon Family (Mo Liqing, Mo Lihong, Mo Lihai, and Mo Lishou) to the battle. The 2 sides were deadlocked at first but the 4 generals of the Demon Family each had a magic weapon, Jiang Ziya, and others were defeated. At this time, Huang Tianhua and Yu Ding Zhenren's apprentice Yang Jian came to help. Yang Jian was good at transformation. After killing the monster Flower Marten controlled by Mo Lishou, he disguised himself as Flower Marten and stole all their magic weapons after the 4 generals fell asleep. Huang Tianhua used the Heart-piercing Nail passed down by his master to nail the 4 generals to death one after another.

=== The 10 Absolute Formations ===
Master Wen recruited 4 generals in Huanghua Mountain and then went to Jin'ao Island to ask the 10 Heavenly Lords for help. Each of these 10 Heavenly Lords had his own mysterious formation. Yao Tianjun first set up the Soul-Falling Formation. He tied up a straw man in an attempt to curse Jiang Ziya to death. Jiang Ziya's soul almost drifted to the Conferred God Platform but fortunately he was rescued by Taishang Laojun. Seeing that Jiang Ziya had returned from his calamity, the immortals were unsure about breaking the 10 Absolute Formations. At this time, the Taoist Master Ran Deng came to help and everyone decided to let him be the leader. On the day of the formation, the 10 Heavenly Lords faced the 12 Immortals. Qin Tianjun first set up the Heaven Absolute Formation. Those who entered the formation would be shattered by thunder but he was subdued by Guangfa Tianzun with the Dragon-Escape Pillar. Zhao Tianjun set up the Earth-Fierce Formation. Those who entered the formation would be attacked by thunder and fire. Ju Liusun tied up Zhao Tianjun with the Immortal Binding Rope and broke the formation. Dong Tianjun set up the Wind Roaring Formation and those who entered the formation would be cut to death by the sharp blades in the wind. After obtaining the Wind-Fixing Pearl from Du'e Zhenren, the formation was broken by Cihang Daoist. Yuan Tianjun set up the Ice Formation and after Samantabhadra entered the formation, he used the golden light to melt the sharp ice blades and then killed Yuan Tianjun with the Wu Gou Sword. Jin Guang Shengmu set up the Golden Light Formation and those who entered the formation would be turned into pus and blood by the golden light. After Guangchengzi entered the formation, he killed Jin Guang Shengmu with the Fantian Seal. Sun Tianjun set up the Blood Transformation Formation and those who entered the formation would be turned into blood and water. After Taiyi Zhenren entered the formation, he killed Sun Tianjun with the 9 Dragons Divine Fire Cover. When Master Wen saw that the 6 formations were broken, he went to Mount Emei to ask Zhao Gongming for help.

=== Zhao Gongming ===
After Zhao Gongming went to the battle, he beat Jiang Ziya to heavy injury with a whip. His magic weapon Dinghaizhu also overwhelmed the 5 immortals but he was defeated by Xiao Sheng and Cao Bao, the wanderers of Wuyi Mountain. He went to Sanxian Island to borrow the 2 magic weapons, Golden Dragon Shears and Hunyuan Golden Bowl from his 3 sisters. Jiang Ziya was saved by Guangchengzi with an elixir and the wandering Taoist Lu Ya also came to help Jiang Ziya. Lu Ya shot Zhao Gongming to death with the 7 Arrows of the Nail Head and the 10 Heavenly Lords had to set up the formation again. Bai Tianjun set up the Fiery Array and those who entered the formation were burned by the Samadhi True Fire. After Lu Ya entered the formation, he killed Bai Tianjun with a gourd. Yao Tianjun set up the Soul-Falling Array and those who entered the formation were instantly shattered. After Chi Jingzi entered the formation, he used the Yin-Yang Mirror to kill Yao Tianjun. Wang Tianjun set up the Red Water Array and those who entered the formation would turn into blood water if they touched the red water in the formation. Daode Zhenjun rode a lotus into the formation and fanned Wang Tianjun into red ash with the 5 Fires and 7 Birds Fan, thus breaking the formation. Zhang Tianjun set up a red sand formation and those who entered the formation would be crushed to death by flying sand. King Wu of Zhou personally came out to break the formation and suffered the destined 100 days of suffering in the formation. The 3 fairies of Sanxian Island were entrusted by Shen Gongbao to leave the island to help Master Wen. They once captured Lu Ya but he successfully escaped. The 3 fairies set up the dangerous 9 Bends of the Yellow River Formation that trapped all the 12 Immortals of Kunlun. Jiang Ziya had to ask Yuanshi Tianzun and lao zi to break the formation. Afterwards, Nanji Xianweng entered the red sand formation and hit Zhang Tianjun in the back with a jade ruyi. After breaking the formation, he rescued King Wu. Master Wen saw that all 10 formations were broken so he had to defeat and go to Qishan but he was ambushed along the way and finally went to Juelong Ridge by mistake. He was burned to death by Yun Zhongzi with the Tongtian Divine Fire Pillar and died for his country.

=== Jiang Ziya designs to capture Deng Jiugong ===
Shen Gongbao once again sought out the immortal guest to avenge Master Wen. He instigated Tu Xingsun, a disciple of the 12 Immortals, Juliusun to steal his master's immortal rope and descend the mountain to serve as a general of Deng Jiugong who was attacking Xiqi. At first, seeing that Tu Xingsun was short and ugly, Deng Jiugong made him a grain supervisor. However, after Deng Jiugong was defeated by the Xiqi army and his daughter Deng Chanyu was bitten by Yang Jian's Roaring Sky Dog, he remembered Tu Xingsun and made him the commander-in-chief. Tu Xingsun defeated Nezha, Huang Tianhua and other generals with his earth-walking skills and immortal rope. Deng Jiugong was very happy and planned to marry Chanyu to him. However, Tu Xingsun failed to assassinate Jiang Ziya, was later subdued by Juliusun, and surrendered to Xiqi. Jiang Ziya took advantage of the marriage between Tu Xingsun and Deng Chanyu to force Deng Jiugong to abandon Shang and join Zhou. After hearing the report, Di Xin sent Su Hu, Zhang Shan, Li Jin to attack, and they were helped by Qigong Master Lü Yue and Yuyixian from Penglai Island but they were all defeated. Su Hu seeing that the situation was hopeless, returned to Zhou with Zheng Lun while Lü Yue was defeated, returned to Jiulong Island, and Yuyixian was subdued by Taoist Master Ran Deng.

=== Yin Jiao and Yin Hong ===
Yin Jiao and Yin Hong were the sons of Di Xin, born to Queen Jiang. Yin Jiao was originally the crown prince and Yin Hong was the prince of a county. After Daji plotted to kill Queen Jiang, the 2 princes were sentenced to death for premeditated regicide. Later they were rescued by the immortals of the Chan Sect and after they had achieved success in their cultivation, they each received a magic weapon from their master and went down the mountain to assist King Wu of Zhou. After Yin Hong went down the mountain, he was seduced by Shen Gongbao and changed his mind to become an enemy of Zhou. Although the Yiqi Immortal Ma Yuan assisted him, Ma Yuan was turned into ashes by Chi Jingzi with the Tai Chi Diagram. Since Ma Yuan's name was not on the Conferred God List, the Taoist Zhunti took him to the West. On the other hand, he accepted 2 generals, Wen Liang and Ma Shan after Yin Jiao bid farewell to his master. Shen Gongbao provoked him to oppose Jiang Ziya with the tragic death of Yin Hong and Yin Jiao angrily helped the Yin Dynasty. Luo Xuan, the Flame Immortal of Fire Dragon Island came forward to help him, but Luo Xuan was defeated by Princess Longji and was eventually burned to death by Li Jing in a pagoda. Yin Jiao was defeated by Jiang Ziya and the Taoist Master Ran Deng and died from being ploughed. Di Xin ordered Hong Jin to go to war. Hong Jin was defeated by Princess Longji and was about to be killed by her but Elder Yuehe said that they were destined to be together so they chose a date to get married.

=== Send troops to Chaoge ===
After Jiang Ziya went on stage to pay respect to the general, he led his troops to Chaoge. Kong Xuan blocked the way at Jinji Ridge. There were 5 divine lights behind him that made anyone who saw them faint. His general Gao Jineng released centipedes to kill Huang Tianhua. Huang Feihu avenged his son and Kong Xuan had a connection with the Western Religion and was taken to the West by the Taoist Zhunti. In front of Jiameng Pass, Guangchengzi killed the Holy Mother of Fire Spirit under the Taoist Duobao and returned her Golden Cloud Crown to the Biyou Palace. As a result, he had conflicts with the disciples of Jiejiao laying the foundation for the formation of the 10000 Immortals. Jiang Ziya faced Shen Gongbao in front of the pass. Shen Gongbao injured Jiang Ziya with the Kaitianzhu but was tied up by Ju Liusun's immortal rope. He swore in front of Yuanshi Tianzun that he would not obstruct Jiang Ziya again, otherwise he would be stuffed into the North Sea Eye. When the Xiqi army arrived at Qinglong Pass, Chen Qi, the grain supervisor at Qinglong Pass could exhale a stream of yellow air from his mouth. Deng Jiugong was hit by this magic and fell off his horse and was beheaded. Seeing this, Tu Xingsun ordered Zheng Lun, the grain supervisor who could exhale 2 streams of white light from his nose to fight. The 2 generals were evenly matched but Nezha and Huang Feihu came to help and Huang Feihu finally stabbed Chen Qi to death. After that, the Xiqi army defeated the Taoist priests Yu Hua and Yu Yuan as well as Han Sheng, the son of Han Rong, the commander of Sishui Pass. Han Rong fell to his death after his son was defeated.

=== Zhuxian and Wanxian Formations ===
Inside the pages of the Zhong Xing printed edition of the novel (book three)

The Jiejiao master Tongtian led his disciples to set up the Zhuxian formation. When Taishang Laojun saw that his junior brother was obstructing the Zhou army from responding to the destiny, he transformed into the 3 Pure Ones and defeated Tongtian. The Zhuxian formation was also broken by Yuanshi Tianzun, Taishang Laojun, Zhunti Taoist, and Jieyin Taoist. The army passed through Jiepai Pass, Chuanyun Pass, and Tongguan. Xu Gai abandoned the dark and joined the light to submit to the Great Zhou. Xu Fang, Yu Hualong, his son Fajie, Lu Yu, and many other guarding officers and Jiejiao disciples were killed or subdued one after another. The Jiejiao immortals finally set up the Wanxian formation to compete with the Chanjiao and Shen Gongbao who had always been against Jiang Ziya was also in the Wanxian formation. The immortals on both sides showed their magical powers and the battle was very fierce. The 10000 Immortals Formation was eventually broken by Yuanshi Tianzun, Taishang Laojun, Jieyin Taoist, and Zhunti Taoist. Just as the remaining Jiejiao scattered immortals were discussing how to rise again, the ancestor of the 3 religions, Hongjun Laozu arrived. Hongjun Laozu scolded Tongtian for being angry and foolish and doing evil and asked the 3 disciples to take the elixir. If the 3 of them had the intention to fight each other again, the elixir in their stomachs would take effect and kill them immediately. After that, the immortals returned to their palaces. On the way back to Yuxu Palace, Yuanshi Tianzun saw the fleeing Shen Gongbao so he rolled him up on a futon and took him to Saibei Sea Eye for breaking his oath.

=== The Seven Monsters of Meishan ===
During the Xiqi campaign, Di Xin and Daji continued their cruelty. They smashed the tibia of an old man and a young boy to compare the density of their marrow, and cut open the belly of a pregnant woman to verify the gender and direction of the foetus. The Xiqi army passed Lintong Pass and defeated the defending general Ouyang Chun and several deputy generals. However, Zhang Kui, the general commander of Mianchi County and his wife Gao Lanying were very powerful. Huang Feihu, Chong Heihu, Tuxingsun, and Deng Chanyu all died here. Seeing the fierce battle, Jiang Ziya had to retreat temporarily. After knowing that his apprentice had died in the battle, Juliusun passed on the plan of luring the tiger away from the mountain to Jiang Ziya and others. Zhang Kui fell into the trap and was trapped by Yang Jian with the "Pointing to the Ground to Become Steel" Talisman. He was later beaten to death by Wei Hu while Gao Lanying was killed by Nezha's spear. Under the heavy reward from Di Xin, the 7 Monsters of Meishan responded to the imperial edict to seek talents and led troops to meet the Xiqi army. The 7 Monsters of Meishan were 7 spirits transformed from animals, Gao Ming, and Gao Jue, spirits transformed from peach spirits, willow ghosts, and the giant Wu Wenhua also came to help but Gao Ming, Gao Jue, and Wu Wenhua all died at the hands of Jiang Ziya. Although Yuan Hong, the leader of the 7 Monsters of Meishan were equally good as Yang Jian after Nuwa gave Yang Jian the map of mountains, rivers, and states, Yang Jian used the map to trap Yuan Hong in an illusion. The 7 Monsters were eventually killed but Zhou Ying also lost generals such as Zheng Lun, Yang Ren, and Longxuhu.

=== The Shang and Zhou Dynasties ===
The Xiqi army was unstoppable and killed Di Xin's general Yin Pobai but it was difficult to break through Chaoge City for a while. Jiang Ziya drafted a draft and asked the soldiers to shoot the notice into the city with arrows to let the people know about Di Xin's evil deeds. In the middle of the night, the people opened the 4 gates of Chaoge City to welcome the arrival of King Wu. Seeing that the army was approaching the city, Di Xin had to gather his troops for a battle. After Ziya told Di Xin's 10 major crimes, the 3 princes fought against Di Xin. Even though 3 generals came forward to help Di Xin, he still returned to the Meridian Gate in defeat. Di Xin knew that it was difficult to change God's will. After saying goodbye to Su Daji, Hu Ximei, and Wang Guiren, he went to Zhaixing Tower alone. Su Daji and the other 3 demons were chased by Yang Jian and others and met Nuwa on the way. Nuwa denounced the 3 demons for indulging in killing and harming loyal people. The 3 demons were eventually beheaded and displayed to the public. When Di Xin saw the heads of the 3 queens in the Zhaixing Tower, he was so sad that he burned himself to death. King Wu of Zhou ordered his men to collect the remains of Di Xin and bury them with the rites of an emperor. After that, he distributed the wealth of Lutai and implemented benevolent policies. When Ma heard that her former husband was now rich and powerful, she was ashamed, hanged herself to death, and her soul flew to Fengshentai. Jiang Ziya knew that the matter was settled so he went to Fengshentai to confer titles on the gods. After reading the edict of Yuanshi Tianzun, he conferred titles on 365 gods in order and the gods went to receive their titlesafter that. The next morning, King Wu ascended the palace and conferred titles on the princes of various countries while Jiang Ziya continued to assist King Wu of Zhou to ensure that the people lived and worked in peace and the world was peaceful.

Illustrations of selected major characters in the novel

Zhou Wenwang

Jiang Ziya

Yang Jian

Nezha

Di Xin

Daji

Wen Taishi

Shen Gongbao

== Magic vessel ==
=== Fengshen Bang ===
The Fengshen Bang (Chinese: 封神榜, meaning "a register of deities") is a key magic vessel in the Investiture of the Gods. Jointly drafted by the Chan sect (阐教), the Jie sect (截教) and the human realm (人道), Fengshen Bang records the deities chosen for appointment to the celestial bureaucracy. Execution of its provisions is entrusted to Jiang Ziya (姜子牙).

Altogether, 365 righteous deities are registered, arranged in eight departments. The upper division comprises the Departments of Thunder, Fire, Plague and the Stellars. The lower division lists the Mansions, the Three Mountains and Five Peaks, Cloud-and-Rain and the Gods of Virtue and Vice. Seven heroes who attain sainthood with human flesh—Li Jing, Jinzha, Muzha, Nezha, Yang Jian, Wei Hu and Lei Zhenzi—stand outside the register's tally.

== Selected anecdotes ==
The novel features many stories in which various supernatural beings enter the human realm and change the fates of mortals and the course of history with their magical powers. The following are some anecdotes.

=== Nüwa and Di Xin ===
Di Xin visits the temple of the ancient Chinese goddess Nüwa to offer incense and pray. As he was doing so, there came a gust of wind which blew up the cover on Nüwa’s statue. He notices that the statue of the goddess is very attractive. The lewd king spouts blasphemy before the statue, declaring "It would be wonderful if I could marry her". He writes poems on the walls to express his lust for the goddess. He has offended Nüwa unknowingly and Nüwa foresees that Di Xin is destined to be the last ruler of the Shang dynasty. As Di Xin will live for another 28 years, she sends the thousand year old vixen spirit, nine-headed pheasant spirit and jade pipa spirit to torture Di Xin. As a result, Di Xin becomes obsessed with the spirits, who disguise themselves as beautiful women, and starts to neglect state affairs and rule with cruelty. The people suffer under his tyranny and eventually join Ji Fa to rise up and overthrow him.

=== Daji and Bo Yikao ===
Di Xin places Ji Chang, the Western Duke, under house arrest in Youli for almost seven years. Ji Chang's eldest son Bo Yikao comes to Zhaoge (present-day Hebi, Henan) to plead with Di Xin to release his father. Daji falls in love with Bo Yikao and requests the king to permit Bo Yikao to teach her how to play the guqin. Daji attempts to seduce Bo Yikao but he rejects and ridicules her. The irate Daji complains to Di Xin that Bo Yikao molested her and insulted the king through his music. The king is furious and he has Bo Yikao executed, his flesh minced and made into meat pies, and served to his father. Ji Chang knows divination and has already foreseen his son's fate. He suppresses his sorrow and consumes the meat cakes. After that incident, Di Xin lowers his guard against Ji Chang and allows the latter to return home. Ji Chang builds up his forces and plans to avenge his son.

=== Ji Chang and Jiang Ziya ===
Jiang Ziya is an apprentice of master of the Kunlun Mountains Yuanshi Tianzun. He leaves his master at the age of 72. He only uses a straight fishhook without bait, three feet above the water, for angling. His neighbours are puzzled by his odd method of fishing. They ask him out of curiosity. Jiang replies, "What I'm angling is not a single fish, but the king and the great many vassals. Only those who really wish to go on the hook will be fished by me." Jiang Ziya means that he is waiting for a wise ruler who recognises his talent and needs him.

Some people tell Ji Chang about Jiang and Ji Chang becomes interested in him. One day, Ji Chang pays a visit to Jiang Ziya. Jiang demands that the duke helps him pull his cart. Ji Chang does so and stops pulling after he has moved 800 steps forwards. Jiang Ziya tells the duke that his future kingdom (the Zhou dynasty) will exist for 800 years. Ji Chang wishes to pull the cart for a few more steps but he is too exhausted to move forward. Jiang Ziya becomes the chancellor of Zhou afterwards and assists Ji Chang in building his kingdom.

=== Bi Gan loses his heart ===
From the prophecy revealed by the oracle bones, Jiang Ziya predicts that Di Xin's loyal and benevolent courtier, Bi Gan, will die soon. He gives a charm to Bi Gan. One night, during a banquet hosted by Di Xin, several "immortals" appear and the king is delighted to see them. The "immortals" are actually Daji's fellow fox spirits in disguise, and Bi Gan, who is also present at the banquet, senses something amiss. Bi Gan's suspicions are confirmed when the fox spirits reveal their tails unknowingly after getting drunk. Bi Gan gathers a group of soldiers and they track the fox spirits back to their den and kill all of them. Bi Gan uses the foxes' hides to make a cloak and presents it to Di Xin. Daji is horrified and saddened when she sees the cloak, and she secretly plots vengeance on Bi Gan.

Not long later, Daji tells Di Xin that she has a heart attack and only a "delicate seven-aperture heart" (七巧玲瓏心) can relieve her agony. No one in the palace has that type of heart except Bi Gan, who is revered as a saint. Bi Gan swallows the charm given by Jiang Ziya, grabs his heart, pulls it out of his body, and presents it to Di Xin. Bi Gan does not die immediately nor sheds a single drop of blood. Instead, he walks out of the palace and follows Jiang Ziya's instructions to go straight home without looking back.

When he is only a few steps away from home, a female huckster yells from behind, "Hey! Cheap cabbages without stems (hearts)!" (The "heart" rhetorically refers to the stem of the plant.) Bi Gan turns around, then asks the huckster in curiosity, "How can there be cabbages without stems?" The woman puts on an evil grin and replies, "You're right, sir. Cabbages cannot live without stems just as men cannot live without hearts." Bi Gan shouts, collapses, and dies. The huckster is actually the jade pipa spirit in disguise.

=== The Four Saints of Nine Dragon Island ===
The Four Saints of Nine Dragon Island (九龙岛四圣) are a set of four fictional characters. These four individuals are Wang Mo, Yang Sen, Gao Youqian, and Li Xingba; each of them are renowned as superior men. These four superior men would later be personally recruited by Grand Old Master Wen Zhong in an attempt to put an end to the threat of King Wu.

== Creations of Daji ==
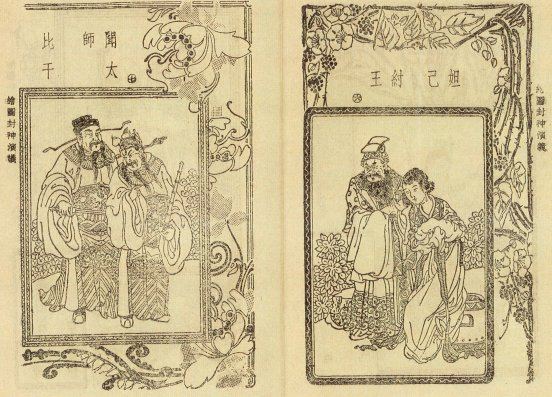
Illustrations of Fengshen Yanyi. Left: Bi Gan and Wen Zhong; Right: Di Xin and Daji

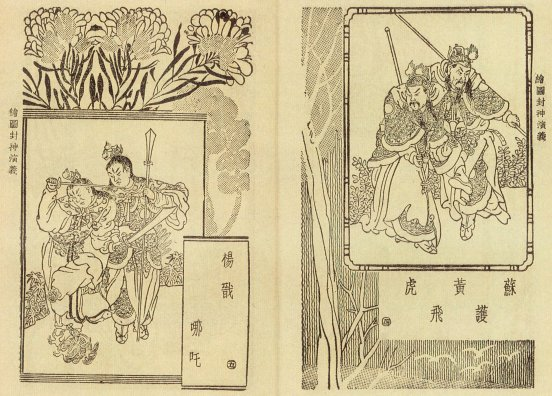
Illustrations of Fengshen Yanyi. Left: Yang Jian and Nezha; Right: Su Hu and Huang Feihu

This is a list of the variety of projects created by Daji throughout the novel Fengshen Yanyi by Xu Zhonglin and Lu Xixing.

=== The Bronze Toaster ===
The Bronze Toaster, intended as a torture and execution device, was first suggested by Daji. It is a bronze cylindrical device that is over twenty feet tall and eight feet wide. It has two wheels on each side so it can be moved around. There are three layers of charcoal over three layers of burning fire inside the device. The victims were stripped naked and tied before being placed into the pit. The pit was used to execute Grand Counselor Mei Bo. Big fans were used to intensify the fire during the execution of Mei Bo.

The Bronze Toaster was only mentioned in Chapter 6.

=== The Snake Pit ===
The Snake Pit, another torture device, was first introduced in Chapter 17. The 25-feet wide snake pit was dug beneath the Star-Picking Belvedere. Venomous spiders and exceedingly venomous snakes were put into the pit. Once this pit was finally constructed, seventy-two unfortunate maidens, with their hair shaved and clothes stripped, were tied and thrown into the pit to feed the snakes.

This torturing device was mentioned multiple times after Chapter 17.

=== The Wine Pool and Meat Forest ===
The Wine Pool and Meat Forest were introduced in Chapter 17. The Wine Pool was located on the left side of the Snake Pit, while the Meat Forest was on the right, thus forming a small park before the Star-Picking Belvedere. Fifty maidens and fifty eunuchs were chosen and tied together to form 50 pairs. Each individual pair would then get thrown into the pool and would be asked to drink the pool's wine while performing swimming tricks. Once each pair is readily drunk, they would be put into the Meat Forest to enjoy an abundance of cooked duck, roasted pig, etc. By sunset a few pairs would then be beaten to a bloody pulp and secretly fed to Daji to ease her need for human flesh.

This method of torture, created by Daji, was first mentioned in Chapter 17, as well as multiple times afterward.

=== The Deer Gallery ===
The Deer Gallery is also mentioned in Chapter 17. Daji had chosen this Deer Gallery as an ensured way to put an end to Jiang Ziya, who had been entrusted to complete the impossible mission of creating the Deer Gallery itself. This large tower-like structure was forty-nine feet in height (double the size of the Star-Picking Belvedere), fully equipped with columns of jade, floors of marble, roofs and ceilings of legendary jewels, and railings of great pearls and sea corals.

== Authorship ==
The authorship of Investiture of the Gods is still debated. The three most commonly attributed writers were Xu Zhonglin, Lu Xixing (陸西星), and Li Yunxiang (李雲祥). The earliest surviving printed edition credits "Zhongshan Yisou Xu Zhonglin" (鍾山逸叟許仲琳) on the first page of the second volume. However, the same edition also contains a preface by Li Yunxiang, who says that he revised and edited the novel, suggesting that he may have played a role in its authorship.

Scholar Sun Kaidi (孫楷第) found early records that attribute the novel to "Lu Changgeng" (陸長庚), the courtesy name of the Daoist Internal Alchemy East Sect founder Lu Xixing. Scholar Chen Hong (陳洪) gives three reasons in support of this theory. First, the novel's Daoist terms and ideas are similar to those in Lu Xixing's other works. Second, the character Lu Ya Daoren (陸壓道人) teaches the "dual cultivation of nature and life," which matches Lu Xixing's philosophy. Third, Lu Ya is an independent immortal who guides the story and may have been created as Lu Xixing's literary self-portrait.

== Historical inspirations ==
The novel was written during the Longqing (reigned from 1567 to 1572) and Wanli eras of the Ming dynasty by compiling and assembling material from several earlier works. According to publisher and scholar Zhao Jingshen, the first thirty chapters are largely based on the Song–Yuan dynasties storyteller's prompt-book Pinghua of King Wu's Expedition against Zhou (全相武王伐纣平话). After chapter thirty, the author moved away from the historical prompt-book and focused on original supernatural stories. The novel also drew material from works such as Yu Shaoyu's Spring and Autumn Annals of the Various States (春秋列国志传) and the Yuan dynasty Comprehensive Collection of Deities from the Three Religions (绘图三教源流搜神大全), while also following the narrative styles of historical novels like Romance of the Three Kingdoms and Water Margin.

Although Investiture of the Gods is a work of fantasy, many parts of its story are based on earlier historical texts, including the Classic of History (Shangshu), the Classic of Poetry (Shijing), and Sima Qian's Records of the Grand Historian (Shiji). Several events involving King Zhou of Shang, such as his indulgence in wine and women, the bronze pillar punishment (Paoluo), the execution of his uncle Bi Gan, and his death by self-immolation, were adapted from the "Annals of Yin" chapter of the Records of the Grand Historian.

The novel's main mythological elements also developed from earlier folk traditions and literary works. Important themes, including Jiang Ziya's investiture of the gods and early versions of many of the novel's demons, already appeared in works such as the Yuan dynasty Pinghua of King Wu's Expedition against Zhou (武王伐纣平话) and the Ming dynasty Lieguo Zhizhuan (列国志传).

== Versions ==
The Investiture of the Gods was written around the reign of Emperor Longqing (reigned from 1567 to 1572) and Emperor Wanli of the Ming dynasty. The earliest existing print version is called "New Edition of Investiture of the Gods Commented by Zhong Bojing" in 20 volumes and 100 chapters. The cover of this edition is inscribed with "Jinchang Bookstore Shu Chongfu's Signature", and the front of the second volume is signed "Jinchang Zaiyang Shu Wenyuan Zixing", so this edition is called "Shuben". There are differences between Shuben versions and current popular versions (current popular versions, for example, include the Yuelu Publishing House 1988 edition, ISBN 978-7-80520-120-7) in the 99th and 100th chapters.

== Criticism ==
Although the novel is now seen as one of the great vernacular epic novels of Chinese literature, it has received some criticism from literary critics of the past. In comparing the work to other major Chinese novels, Lu Xun remarked in his 1924 book A Brief History of Chinese Fiction that Fengshen Yanyi "lacks the realism of Water Margin and the imaginative brilliance of Journey to the West."

== Impact and influence ==
According to a literary analysis in Beijing Daily, the novel can be interpreted as taking a "pro-Daoist, anti-Buddhist" stance, which some scholars see as a response to the Buddhist themes in Journey to the West. In the novel, Daoist figures such as Hongjun Laozu and his three disciples occupy the highest positions, while future Buddhist figures, including the Western Saints, are placed at lower or equal ranks. The novel is also influenced by the political philosophy of Mencius, especially the idea that the welfare of the people is more important than the authority of the ruler. Some scholars argue that its portrayal of the overthrow of the tyrant King Zhou reflects subtle anti-authoritarian and revolutionary ideas.

The main conflict of the novel is between the Chan Sect (阐教) and the Jie Sect (截教). However, neither sect existed in historical Taoism. They were fictional creations by the author to represent the conflict between orthodox teachings and popular folk beliefs. The author also changed elements of the traditional Taoist pantheon for the story. In orthodox Taoism, the supreme trinity is the Three Pure Ones (Laozi, Yuanshi Tianzun, and Lingbao Tianzun). In the novel, Laozi and Yuanshi Tianzun remain as leaders of the orthodox Chan Sect, but Lingbao Tianzun is removed from the supreme position. The author instead created the fictional figure Tongtian Jiaozhu as the leader of the Jie Sect, using major religious figures to create the conflict of the fictional war.

Scholars Nie Gannu and Wang Kaiyun noted its strong influence on Chinese folk religion. They argued that the novel helped popularize the worship of figures such as Zhao Gongming and the Sanxiao Sisters, and that some local communities even changed the names of traditional deities to match those in the novel.

Japanese scholar Issei Tanaka suggested that the novel became especially popular in rural Jiangnan because its list of 365 gods suited the needs of local Taiping Qingjiao rituals, which were held to comfort the spirits of people who had died in clan conflicts. Over time, some villages replaced the forgotten names of local spirits with the names of characters from the novel.

Scholar Hu Wenhui also suggests that the fictional conflict between the Chan (阐教) and Jie (截教) sects is an allegory for religious rivalries during the Ming dynasty. According to this interpretation, the Chan Sect represents the Quanzhen school, while the Jie Sect represents the Zhengyi school.

During the late Qing dynasty, revolutionary leaders adapted the novel's characters as symbols of resistance, particularly among rural populations. For example, the revolutionary leader Li Fangchun assigned his followers the identities of heroes from the novel to inspire them. He claimed that the rebel Huang Dangxuan was the reincarnation of Nezha, Ma Fangxian was Jiang Ziya, and Liu Guangmin was Tuxingsun. By giving his followers these divine identities, Li sought to convince his peasant recruits that they possessed sacred origins and were capable of enduring hardship and facing death in battle without fear.

The novel's descriptions of magical combat had a documented influence on late Qing dynasty politics. Empress Dowager Cixi was reportedly a devoted reader, and her belief that real individuals could possess the magical invulnerability described in the book contributed to her support for the Boxers during the Boxer Rebellion.

Historical records show that Investiture of the Gods became connected with some grassroots religious practices in rural China. According to the Jianchang (Yongxiu) Local History (建昌乡土志), rural communities incorporated stories from the novel into Ghost Festival (Zhongyuan) ceremonies. Every ten years, villages would establish a ritual venue and invite theatrical troupes to perform stories from Investiture of the Gods alongside the Mulian Rescues His Mother tradition.

These ceremonies, known as Taiping Qingjiao (太平清醮), were held to honor local people who had died during violent clan conflicts. The rituals included recording the names of deceased community members in ancestral halls. Because Investiture of the Gods contained a list of 365 deified figures, including both righteous and negative characters, its pantheon could be adapted to the needs of these rituals. In some communities, when the identities of earlier deceased villagers were no longer remembered, names from popular literary works such as Investiture of the Gods, Water Margin, and Romance of the Three Kingdoms were used in their place.

Scenes from Investiture of the Gods are depicted in murals in the Holy Mother Palace of Beishiku Temple, Qingyang, Gansu. The murals were painted during the first year of the Xuantong era (1909).

The gods and immortals from the novel influenced Chinese folk religion. After the novel was published, many folk beliefs came to follow its depiction of the heavenly court, changing the traditional hierarchy of Chinese gods. The novel's list of deities also reflects the growth of god-making (zao shen; 造神) during the Yuan and Ming dynasties.

According to local tradition, the ruins of the Platform of Gods (fengshentai; 封神台), where Jiang Ziya is said to have appointed the gods, are located near Shandi Village in Huangdui Township, Fufeng County, Baoji, Shaanxi. Local tradition says that the gods named in Investiture of the Gods were once worshipped there, but the statues were destroyed during the Cultural Revolution. A replica of the Platform of Gods has since been built at the site, which is now a tourist attraction. Many statues of gods now stand in front of the platform.

== Translations ==
- Xu Zhonglin (1992) [1550s]. Creation of the Gods. Translated by Gu Zhizhong. Beijing: New World Press. ISBN 780005134X.
- Xu Zhonglin (2002) [1550s]. Tales of the Teahouse Retold: Investiture of the Gods. Translated by Katherine Liang Chew. Lincoln, NE: Writers Club Press. ISBN 9780595254194. This is a partial translation containing only the first 46 chapters out of 100.
- Xu Zhonglin (2024) [1550s]. L'ivestitura degli dei. Romanzo cinese di epoca Ming. Translated by Dario Virga. Luni Editrice. ISBN 9788879847049. A complete translation of the novel in Italian.

The book was also translated into Dutch as Feng Shen: De Verheffing tot Goden by Nio Joe Lan (Jakarta, 1940).

The book received a partial translation into French as L'investiture des Dieux translated by J. Garnier in 2002-3

== Adaptations ==
The novel has a significant impact on Chinese and Japanese popular culture. It has been adapted in various forms, including television series, manhua, manga, and video games. Some of the more notable adaptations are listed below:

- Unabridged 1970 Pingshu radio program by Yuan Kuocheng, consisting of the entire Fēngshén Yǎnyì in 200 episodes.
- The Story of Chinese Gods, a 1976 hand-drawn animated film.
- God's Parade, a 1981 TVB TV series which has a song performed by Adam Cheng.
- The Founding of the Zhou Dynasty, the first story arc of the Hong Kong manhua series Legend of Emperors by Wong Yuk-long.
- Hoshin Engi, a Japanese manga series by Ryu Fujisaki based on the translation by Tsutomu Ano of the novel.
- Gods of Honour, a 2001 Hong Kong television series produced by TVB as attributed to God's Parade.
- Mystic Heroes (バトル封神, Batoru Hōshin), a 2002 video game by Koei loosely based on the book.
- The Legend and the Hero, a 2007 Chinese television series. It was followed by a 2009 sequel, The Legend and the Hero 2.
- Warriors Orochi, a video game series produced by Koei. It features three characters from the novel – Daji (called Da Ji in the game), Nezha, and Jiang Ziya (called Taigong Wang in the game) – as playable characters.
- The Investiture of the Gods, a 2014 Chinese live action series produced by Shandong Television and starring Sammul Chan and Viann Zhang.
- League of Gods, a 2016 3D Chinese movie produced by China Star Entertainment Group, starring Jacky Heung as the main character Lei Zhenzi, Jet Li as Jiang Ziya, Tony Leung Ka-fai as Di Xin, Louis Koo as Mahamayuri, Huang Xiaoming as Erlang Shen, Angelababy as the mermaid, Fan Bingbing as Daji, and Wen Zhang as Nezha.
- Chronicles of the God's Order, an ongoing Hong Kong manhua.
- Ne Zha, a 2019 Chinese 3D animation film, and its 2025 sequel Ne Zha 2.
- Investiture of the Gods, a 2019 Chinese live action series produced by Mango Studio and starring Wang Likun, Luo Jin, Zhang Bo, Yu Hewei, Deng Lun, and Collin Chou.
- Jiang Ziya, a 2020 Chinese 3D animation film.
- New Gods: Nezha Reborn, a 2021 Chinese 3D animation film.
- New Gods: Yang Jian, a 2022 Chinese 3D animation film.
- Creation of the Gods, 2023
- Creation of the Gods 2, 2025

== See also ==
- Chinese mythology
- Religion in China
