= Bo Yikao =

Member of Chinese Zhou royal house

Bo Yikao 伯邑考
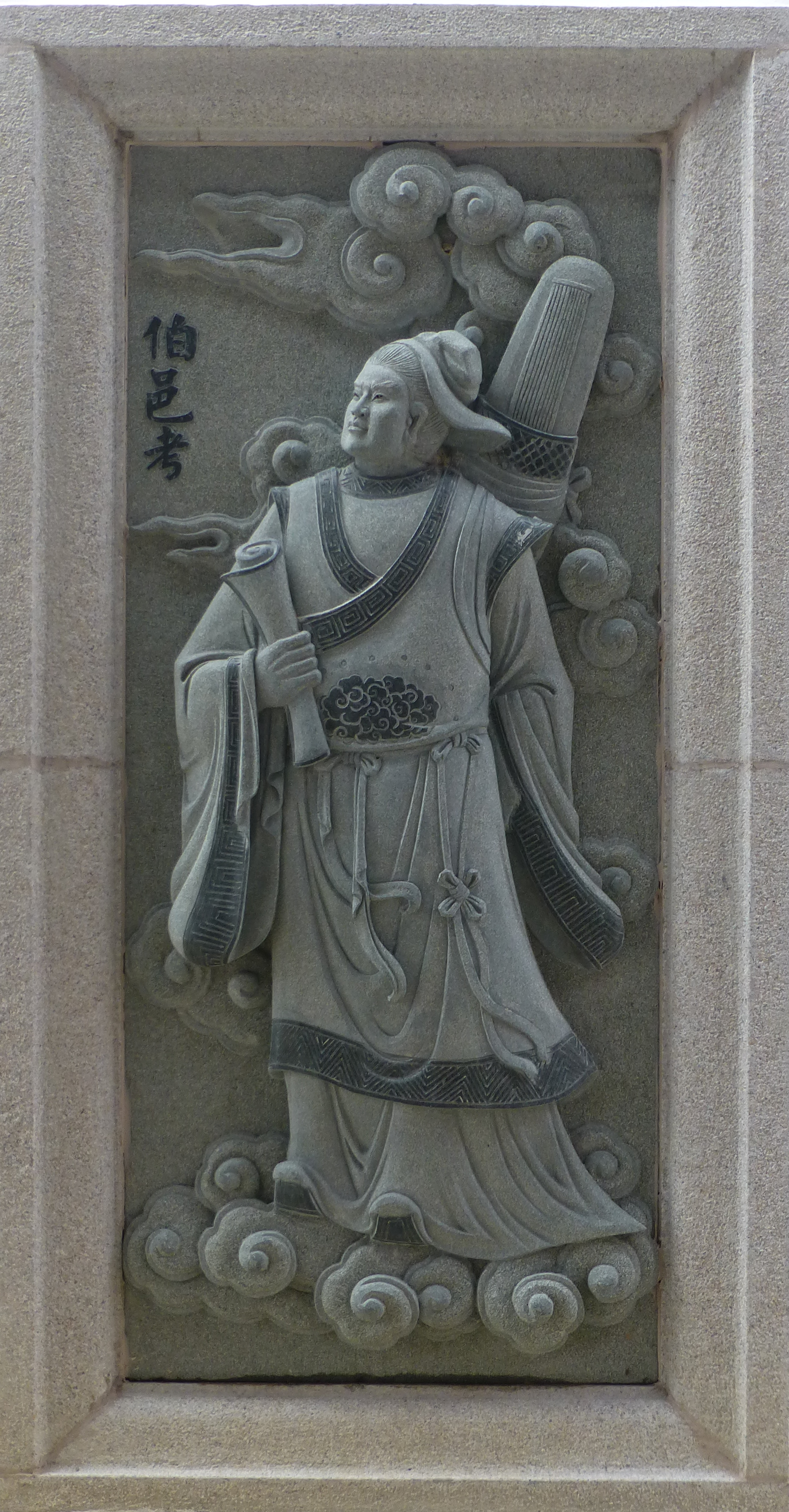
- Photograph from the Ping Sien Si Temple in Perak, Malaysia
Names
- Family name: Ji (姬); Given name: Yikao (邑考)
Posthumous name
- Bo Yikao (伯邑考)
- Father: King Wen of Zhou

Chinese name
- Chinese: 伯邑考
Transcriptions
Standard Mandarin
- Hanyu Pinyin: Bó Yìkǎo
- Wade–Giles: Po Yi-kao

Bo Yikao was the eldest son of King Wen of Zhou and brother of King Wu, the founder of the Zhou dynasty of ancient China.

== Name ==
As a member of the Zhou royal house, his family name was Ji (姬). 伯; Bó refers to his status as the oldest son of his father; 邑; Yì may have been his personal name's element or a posthumous name used for ritual purposes; 考; Kǎo either means "long-lived" or is a posthumous epithet used to refer to a deceased father.

== Life ==
Extremely little is known about Bo Yikao's life according to the Chinese classics. He is cited as an example of virtue in Chunqiu Fanlu, having recused himself to provoke action when the people's hearts were divised, thus following the way of the sages. However, it is not elaborated upon.

== Succession and possible death ==
Despite being the eldest of the sons of King Wen, Bo Yikao did not inherit the throne of Predynastic Zhou. The Rites of Zhou give a possible reason for this: Rather than giving the throne to the oldest sibling, the Zhou preferred to give it to the youngest. This is reflected in King Ji's succession: He had two older brothers, but still inherited the throne. Huainanzi says similar, assuming that King Wu's inheritance simply represented an aberration or even an older tradition among the Zhou of passing over the eldest son. In traditional accounts not entirely dismissed by modern scholarship, Bo Yikao's granduncle Taibo of Wu had likewise been passed over in favor of a younger son.

Later sources embellish the above accounts. Sima Qian believed that Bo Yikao lacked sagely virtue (賢) and predeceased his father and Ji Fa, thus the lack of succession. The 9th-century text Records of Emperors and Kings (帝王世紀) expands on this, stating that Di Xin had killed him with lingchi, despite it being a relatively new but controversial concept at the time. Despite the lack of evidence and anachronism, this text was nevertheless quoted in later works and became a common folk tale, notably being worked into the historical fiction Fengshen Yanyi.

== In fiction ==
In the Fengshen Yanyi, Bo Yikao is the oldest and most outstanding son of Ji Chang, the "Duke of the West" of the Shang dynasty. He is well versed in music and the arts, handsome, and filial. The book recounts the story of Chang's imprisonment at Youli and (ahistorically) credits Yikao with bringing the bribes to free him. At his audience, Di Xin's concubine Daji finds Yikao attractive and has the king employ him to teach her how to play the zither. During a lesson, Daji attempts to seduce the boy but he rejects and ridicules her. Daji's infatuation turns to hatred: she complains to the king that Yikao molested her and insulted the king's music. Di Xin is furious and he orders Yikao to be executed, minced into pieces, and made into meat cakes. The king then sends the cakes to Ji Chang. Ji Chang's mastery of divination means he has already foreseen his son's fate but, in order not to arouse the king's suspicion, he hides his sorrow and gleefully consumes the cakes. Thinking his divination incompetent, the king then allows the duke to leave. On the way home, the grieving Ji Chang vomits out the meat, which transforms into three white rabbits that are later brought under the care of the moon goddess Chang'e.

The horrible death of Bo Yikao had solidified the will of the Zhou people to rebel and overthrow the tyrannical Di Xin. Four years after the death of Ji Chang, Bo Yikao's younger brother Ji Fa rises up and defeats Di Xin at the Battle of Muye, establishing the Zhou dynasty. Bo Yikao's soul is assigned by Jiang Ziya as the Ziwei Emperor, who rules over the North Pole.
