= Zhaoge =

Ancient Chinese city

Zhaoge (Chinese: 朝歌; pinyin: Zhāogē), in modern Qi County, Hebi, Henan province, was the capital of the State of Wey during the Western Zhou period. According to traditional histories, it had been the last capital of the Shang dynasty, from king Geng Ding or Wu Yi through the final three kings. In the 3rd century, Du Yu stated that the Yinxu 'ruins of Yin' referenced in the Zuo Zhuan was Zhaoge.

However, archaeologists now locate Yin, the actual capital of the Late Shang, to a different site. In the early 20th century, archaeologists discovered the capital of the last 11 Shang kings, now known as Yinxu, on the edge of Anyang about 50 km (30 mi) north of Zhaoge.
