= Huang Feihu =

Fictional character from Investiture of the Gods

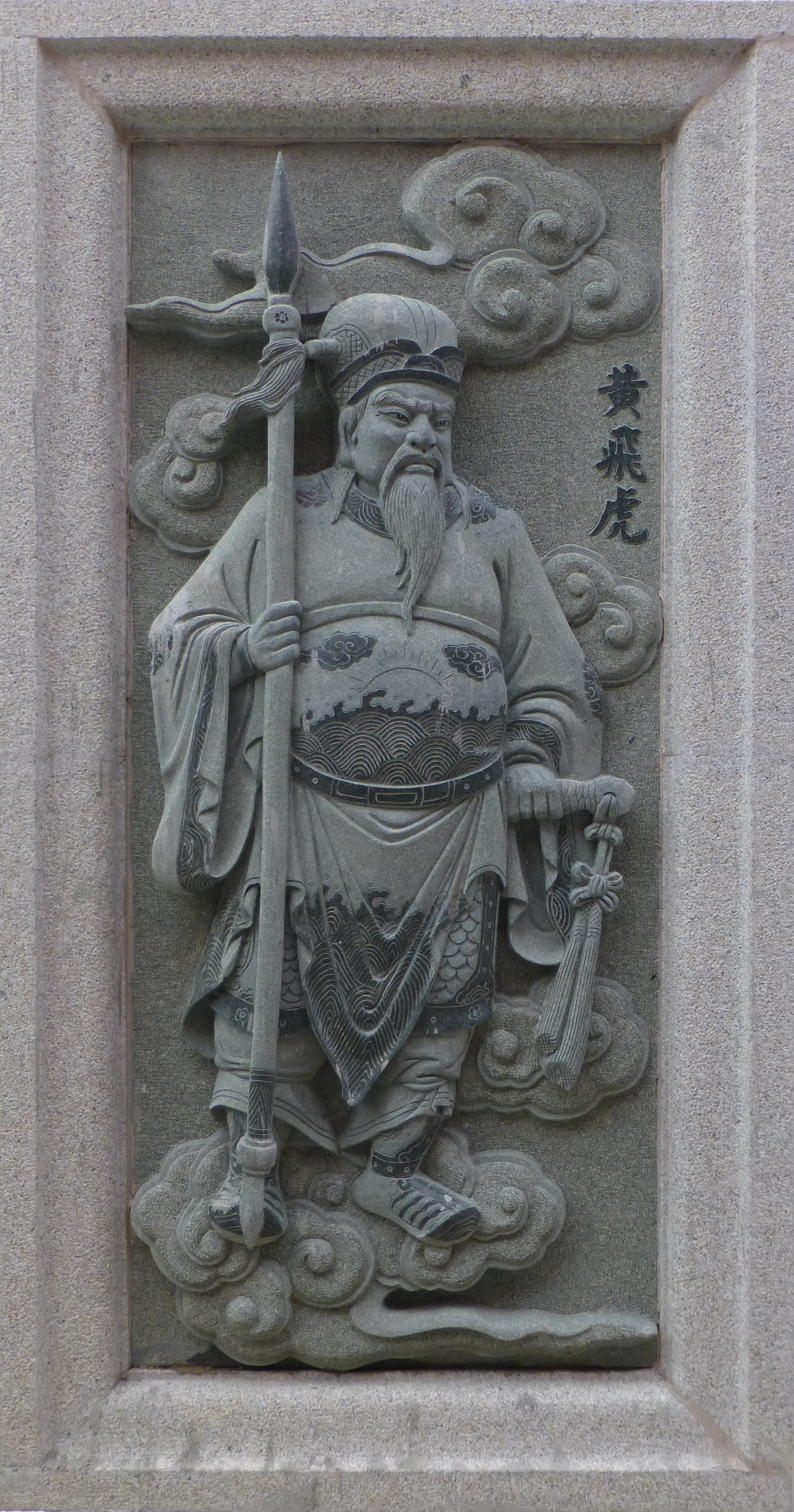
A statue of Huang Feihu, Prince Wucheng.

Huang Feihu (Chinese: 黃飛虎; pinyin: Huáng Fēihǔ; Wade–Giles: Huang Fei-hu) is a character in the Chinese novel Investiture of the Gods (Fengshen Yanyi). He is a military commander of the Shang dynasty who defects to the Zhou dynasty after King Zhou (Di Xin) causes the deaths of his wife and sister.

At the end of the novel, Huang Feihu is appointed the Great Emperor of the Eastern Peak (东岳大帝), with the title 東嶽泰山天齊仁聖大帝. He is given authority over the underworld and over human life, death, and fortune.

== Role in the novel ==
=== Background and defection ===
Huang Feihu is the son of the Shang general Huang Gun and the brother of Huang Feibiao, Huang Feibao, and Consort Huang. He holds the title Prince Wucheng Who Guards the Kingdom (鎮國武成王) and commands Shang forces. His family is described as having served the Shang dynasty for seven generations. He rides a Five-Colored Divine Bull (五色神牛) and uses a spear in battle.

During a New Year's court ceremony, Huang Feihu's wife, Lady Jia (賈氏), is brought to the attention of King Zhou through Daji. When King Zhou attempts to approach her, Lady Jia refuses him and jumps from the Star-Plucking Tower, killing herself. Huang Feihu's sister, Consort Huang (黃妃), confronts the king and is also thrown from the tower and killed.

After learning of their deaths, Huang Feihu decides to leave the Shang. His retainers Huang Ming, Zhou Ji, Long Huan, and Wu Qian accompany him. Huang Feihu leaves Chaoge with his brothers, sons, retainers, and about 1,000 household soldiers and heads toward Xiqi.

On the journey west, Huang Feihu passes through several Shang military defenses. At Tongguan, he is wounded by Chen Tong and later meets his son Huang Tianhua, who helps him recover.

At Jiepai Pass, Huang Feihu encounters his father Huang Gun, who commands the pass. Huang Gun refuses to let his son pass and orders his troops to capture him and take him back to Chaoge. Huang Gun says that the Huang family has served the Shang for seven generations and accuses Huang Feihu of abandoning his loyalty to the dynasty.

Huang Feihu and his followers eventually leave Jiepai Pass and continue toward Xiqi. Huang Gun later joins them.

=== Arrival in Xiqi ===
Huang Feihu reaches Xiqi and meets Jiang Ziya. He explains his reasons for leaving the Shang court, and Jiang Ziya accepts him and his followers.

King Wu receives Huang Feihu and changes his title from Prince Wucheng Who Guards the Kingdom (鎮國武成王) to Prince Wucheng Who Founds the Kingdom (開國武成王). Huang Feihu's father, brothers, sons, four retainers, and household soldiers also enter Xiqi.

Huang Feihu later commands Zhou forces in several campaigns. At Qinglong Pass, he leads an army that includes Huang Ming, Zhou Ji, Long Huan, Wu Qian, Huang Feibiao, Huang Feibao, and his sons Huang Tianlu, Huang Tianjue, and Huang Tianxiang.

During the fighting at Qinglong Pass, Huang Tianxiang is captured and killed. Huang Feihu continues fighting at the pass.

=== Death and deification ===
Huang Feihu is killed at the Battle of Mianchi by the Shang general Zhang Kui (張奎).

In the final chapter, Huang Feihu is appointed Great Emperor of the Eastern Peak, Mount Tai, Equal to Heaven, Benevolent and Sacred (東岳泰山天齊仁聖大帝). The novel gives him authority over the eighteen levels of the underworld and states that matters concerning the lives, deaths, transformations, and fortunes of humans and other beings are to be examined through the Eastern Peak.

== Characterization ==
Mark R. E. Meulenbeld describes Huang Feihu as one of the memorable characters in Investiture of the Gods, noting his martial ability and the compassion he shows toward his subjects and enemies. He also discusses Huang Feihu's appointment as the Great Emperor of the Eastern Peak and his place among the novel's martial deities.

== Worship and folk religion ==
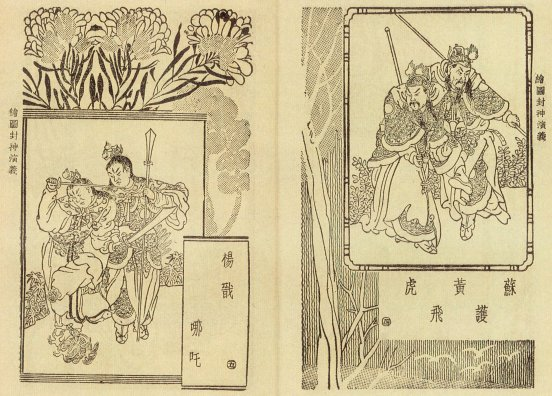
Characters from Investiture of the Gods. From left: Nezha, Yang Jian, Su Hu, and Huang Feihu.

Huang Feihu is worshipped as the Great Emperor of the Eastern Peak (東嶽大帝) in some Chinese temples. The title is older than Investiture of the Gods, which gives it to Huang Feihu.

In Beijing, a Daoist priest interviewed by Anne Swan Goodrich between 1930 and 1932 identified the Great Emperor of the Eastern Peak as Huang Feihu. He also identified the deity in the Hall of the Prince of Mount Tai as Huang Feihu's eldest son, Huang Tianhua.

A similar tradition was recorded in Shanxi. In a 2021 interview, writer Li Tianfei said that folklorist Luan Baoqun had visited an Eastern Peak Temple where Huang Feihu was worshipped. The temple also had a shrine for his father, Huang Gun.

In Yuhang, local tradition also identifies Huang Feihu as the Great Emperor of the Eastern Peak. The Dongyue Temple held a festival around the 28th day of the third lunar month, which was regarded as his birthday.

== Family and associates ==
- Father: Huang Gun (黃滾)
- Spouse: Lady Jia (賈氏)
- Siblings:
  - Huang Feibiao (黃飛彪), younger brother
  - Huang Feibao (黃飛豹), younger brother
  - Consort Huang (黃貴妃), younger sister, Di Xin's concubine
- Children:
  - Huang Tianhua (黃天化), slain by Gao Jineng
  - Huang Tianlu (黃天祿), slain by Wu Wenhua
  - Huang Tianjue (黃天爵)
  - Huang Tianxiang (黃天祥)
- Subordinates:
  - Huang Ming (黃明)
  - Zhou Ji (周紀)
  - Long Huan (龍環)
  - Wu Qian (吳謙)

Li Tianfei also describes a local tradition in Gansu involving Huang Feihu. He says that most residents of one village have the surname Huang and claim to be descendants of Huang Feihu. Li notes that Huang Feihu is a fictional character in Investiture of the Gods, but that local residents believe he was a historical person.

== See also ==
- Dongyue Dadi
- Investiture of the Gods
- Chinese mythology
