= Bi Gan =

Chinese noble in the Shang Dynasty

- 比干
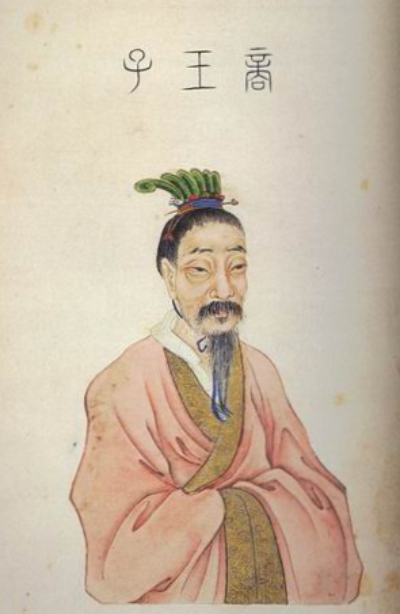
- Painting of Bi Gan featuring his name in small seal script, made during the reign of the Qianlong Emperor, Qing dynasty.
- Other names: Family name: Zi (子); Given name: Bi Gan (比干)
- Occupation: Politician
- Known for: Remonstration of Di Xin

Prime Minister of Shang
- In office ? – c. 1046 BCE
- Monarch: Di Xin

Chinese name
- Chinese: 比干
Transcriptions
Standard Mandarin
- Hanyu Pinyin: Bǐ Gān
Middle Chinese
- Middle Chinese: pjijX kan
Old Chinese
- Baxter–Sagart (2014): /*C.pijʔ [k]ˤar/
- Zhengzhang: /*piʔ kaːn/

Prince Bigan (Chinese: 比干; pinyin: Bǐgān), surnamed "Zi" (子), was a prominent Chinese figure during the Shang dynasty. He was a son of King Wen Ding, and an uncle of Di Xin, and served as the Prime Minister of the Kingdom of Shang. He was later worshipped as the God of Wealth.

== History ==
Prince Bigan was the prime minister of the Kingdom of Shang during the late Shang dynasty, and a member of the Shang royal family. His surname was "Zi" (子). He was the son of King Wen Ding and served his nephew, Di Xin. Di Xin, the last king of the Shang dynasty, has been traditionally regarded as notoriously cruel, immoral, and wasteful. According to the account recorded by Sima Qian in his Records of the Grand Historian, his minister Prince Weizi admonished him to reform his ways several times, but his admonitions fell on deaf ears. Prince Weizi then decided to withdraw from the court, but Prince Bigan argued that to serve as minister meant doing what was right even if it meant death. Prince Bigan continued to strongly criticise his ruler's conduct, and an enraged Di Xin ordered his execution, proclaiming that he wanted to see if it was true that a sage's heart had seven apertures.

David Schaberg has argued that the tendency for later politicians to adopt an indirect style of critique when disagreeing with their rulers was influenced by the gruesome fate of figures like Prince Bigan.

Bi Gan is not mentioned in any known Shang or Western Zhou oracle bone inscriptions.

== Reputation ==
In the Analects, Prince Bigan was honored by Confucius as one of "the three sages" of the Shang dynasty, together with Prince Weizi and Prince Jizi. Prince Bigan later became an exemplar of the loyal advisor willing to lose his life for giving truthful advice. When the Spring and Autumn-era general and politician of Wu, Wu Zixu, was ordered to commit suicide, his last words were, "After my death, later generations will definitely think that I was loyal. They will indeed match me up to the Xia and Yin [i.e., Shang] eras, making me a companion of Longfeng and Bigan”. (Note: Guan Longfeng was a similar figure from the semi-mythical Xia dynasty.) When Hu Yuan, who served King Min of Qi, was about to be executed, he referenced both Prince Bigan and Wu Zixu: "Yin had its Bigan, Wu had its Zixu, and Qi [now] has its Hu Yuan. [This state] not only didn't make use of apt words, it also executed their speaker at its eastern gate. By being executed, I will form a triad with those two masters." The historian Fan Wenlan ranked Prince Bigan alongside Guan Longfeng, Qu Yuan, Zhuge Liang, and Wei Zheng as one of the great frank and courageous patriots of Chinese history.

== God of Wealth ==
Later accounts of the life of Prince Bigan added details, including that his execution came at request of Di Xin's notorious concubine Daji, because she objected that Prince Bigan had remonstrated with Di Xin for wasting money meant for the common good. These depictions were an influence on Prince Bigan's later deification as a Caishen, or God of Wealth. A notable example of this version of Prince Bigan's story can be seen in the famous Ming dynasty novel The Investiture of the Gods. In the end, Jiang Ziya appointed him as Wenquxing (文曲星, 'Star of Literature').

Within the broader wealth-god (Caishen) complex, Prince Bigan is conventionally classified as the principal Civil God of Wealth (文財神; wén cáishén), distinguished from the Military Gods of Wealth (武財神) such as Zhao Gongming by his court-robe iconography and his association with honest, righteous wealth obtained through ethical conduct.

The traditional explanation in popular legend for Prince Bigan's selection as a wealth deity is paradoxical: precisely because his heart was extracted at the order of Di Xin, he is "without a heart" (無心; wú xīn) and therefore incapable of partiality in the distribution of wealth — a quality that, in the popular logic of the cult, makes him an ideally impartial judge of who deserves prosperity.

== Tomb and temple in Weihui ==
The principal cult site associated with Prince Bigan is the Tomb and Temple of Bi Gan (比干廟; Bǐgān miào) in Weihui, Henan province, traditionally identified as the site of his burial. The temple was first constructed around 494 CE under Emperor Xiaowen of the Northern Wei dynasty and has been expanded under successive imperial patronage. It was inscribed on the fourth list of Major Historical and Cultural Sites Protected at the National Level of the People's Republic of China on 20 November 1996.

Because Prince Bigan's son Quan was honoured by King Wu of Zhou as the founding ancestor of the Lin clan (林氏), the temple is also a clan-ancestral site for the global Lin diaspora — particularly populous in Fujian, Taiwan, Singapore, Malaysia and the Korean diaspora (where the surname is romanised as Im or Lim). Annual commemorative ceremonies on Prince Bigan's traditional birthday draw Lin-clan delegations from across East Asia.
