= Leizhenzi =

Character in Investiture of the Gods

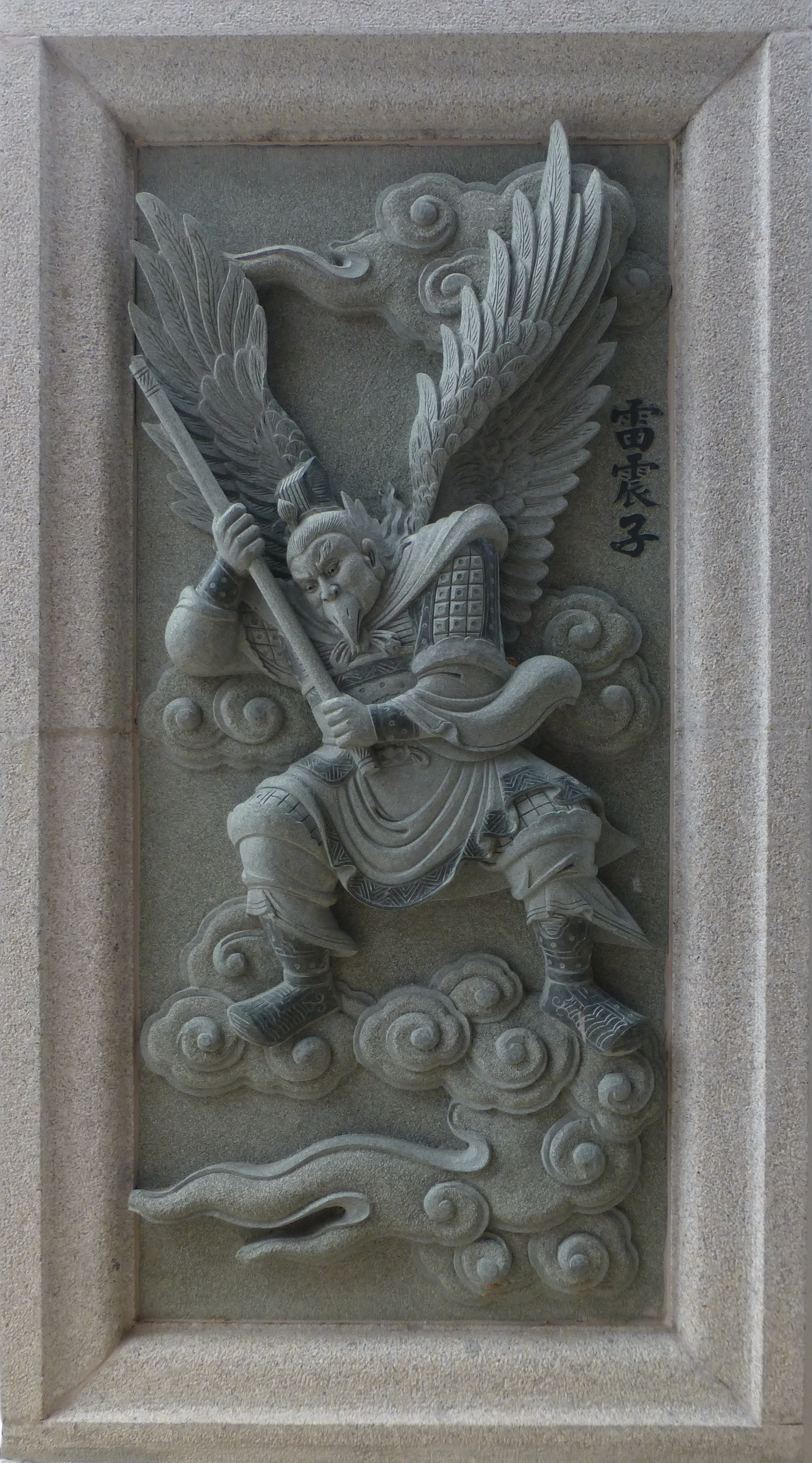
A depiction of Lei Zhenzi at Ping Sien Si

Lei Zhenzi (Chinese: 雷震子; pinyin: Léizhènzǐ), also known as Lei Chen-Tzu or Lei Jen Zu, is a character in the Chinese novel Investiture of the Gods (Fengshen Yanyi). He is the adopted hundredth son of Ji Chang and a disciple of the Daoist immortal Yunzhongzi. He has wings and the power to control wind and thunder. He fights alongside the Zhou army against the Shang dynasty and is also regarded as a thunder god in Chinese tradition.

== In Investiture of the Gods ==
Lei Zhenzi first appears as an infant during a thunderstorm at Mount Swallow. Ji Chang, who is traveling toward the Shang capital, encounters the storm and later sees a light on the mountain. He interprets it as an omen and sends his men to investigate. They find an infant near an old grave, whom Ji Chang takes as his hundredth son and names Lei Zhenzi.

Ji Chang later leaves Lei Zhenzi with Yunzhongzi, who takes him as a disciple. Seven years later, after Ji Chang is released from imprisonment in the Shang capital, Yunzhongzi tells Lei Zhenzi that his father is in danger and sends him to his aid. Before leaving, Lei Zhenzi is instructed to find a weapon at Tiger Cliff. There he eats two large apricots and undergoes a transformation. He grows wings, his face becomes dark blue, his hair turns red, and tusks grow from his mouth. Yunzhongzi gives him a golden rod and writes the characters for "wind" and "thunder" on his wings.

Lei Zhenzi then flies to Ji Chang's aid. He encounters the Shang generals Lei Kai and Yin Chengxiu and drives them away by causing a rockslide with his golden rod. Ji Chang is initially frightened by Lei Zhenzi's transformed appearance, but recognizes him after he gives his name. Lei Zhenzi then carries Ji Chang across several mountain passes and leaves him near the Zhou territory before returning to Yunzhongzi.

Lei Zhenzi later returns to assist the Zhou forces in their campaign against the Shang. He fights alongside his brothers during the final campaigns and participates in the overthrow of King Zhou. After the establishment of the Zhou dynasty, he leaves and is described as becoming an immortal.

== Earlier tradition ==
Lei Zhenzi also appears in the Wuwang Fa Zhou Pinghua (武王伐纣平话), a Yuan dynasty work about the campaign of King Wu of Zhou against the Shang. In the Pinghua, Lei Zhenzi is an adopted son of Ji Chang who rescues his father while he is fleeing the Shang capital. He later reappears with a large sword to assist King Wu in the campaign against King Zhou.

== Other legends ==
Outside the literary tradition of Fengshen Yanyi, Lei Zhenzi also appears in other legends. According to one tradition, although he was not born a dragon, he could transform into one when his adoptive father Wen Wang was taken prisoner and use this form to rescue him.

Another tradition identifies Lei Zhenzi as a son of Dianmu and Leigong. In this version, he is born from an egg that Leigong breaks open with a thunderbolt. He resembles Leigong, with wings and a pointed beak, and possesses supernatural abilities. He can also transform into a dragon after eating apricots.

== Temple ==
At Taigong Temple (太公庙) in Yutai County, Shandong, Lei Zhenzi and Nezha are represented as accompanying figures beside the principal statue of Jiang Taigong. A local report states that the temple contains 85 clay figures and that Lei Zhenzi and Nezha are placed beside Jiang Taigong in the main hall.

A statue of Lei Zhenzi is also enshrined at Jiaying Temple (嘉应观) in Wuzhi County, Henan.

A ceramic sculpture of Lei Zhenzi is also found on the 1929 Xiang Hai Ming Shan Paifang at Qing Shan Zen Monastery in Hong Kong, alongside sculptures of other characters from the novel.

== See also ==
- God of thunder
- Leigong
