= Daji =

Consort of the last Shang dynasty king

Daji 妲己
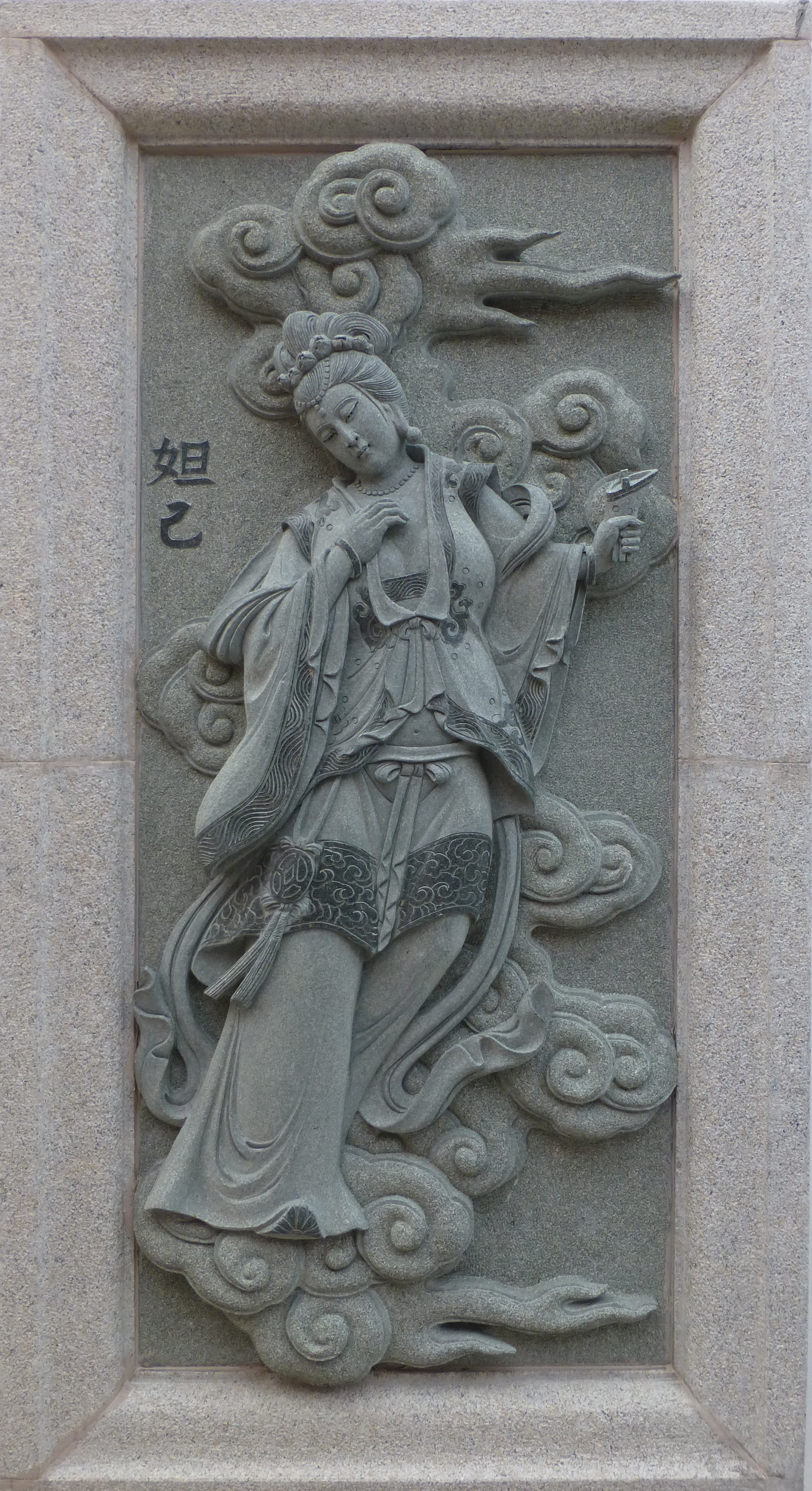
- Daji, as depicted on a relief at Ping Sien Si Temple in Perak, Malaysia
- Born: around 1076 BC
- Died: after 1046 BC
- Spouse: Di Xin
Names
- Clan name: Su (蘇); Courtesy name: Da (妲); Ancestral name: Ji (己)
- Father: Su Hu

Daji (Chinese: 妲己; pinyin: Dájǐ; Wade–Giles: Ta^{²}-chi^{³}) was the alleged favorite consort of Di Xin, the last king of the Shang dynasty in ancient China. However, she is not recorded in contemporary oracle bone inscriptions.

In historical legends and some fictions, she is portrayed as a malevolent fox spirit who kills and impersonates the real Daji. Her identification as a fox spirit seems to have originated from at least the Tang dynasty. These accounts have been popularized in works such as the Wu Wang Fa Zhou Pinghua (武王伐紂平話), the Fengshen Yanyi, and the Lieguo Zhi. She is considered a classic example of how a beautiful femme fatale can cause the downfall of a dynasty in Chinese culture.

In the Song dynasty, fox spirit cults, including those dedicated to Daji, were outlawed, but their suppression was unsuccessful. For example, in 1111, an imperial edict was issued for the destruction of many spirit shrines within Kaifeng, including those of Daji.

== Biography ==
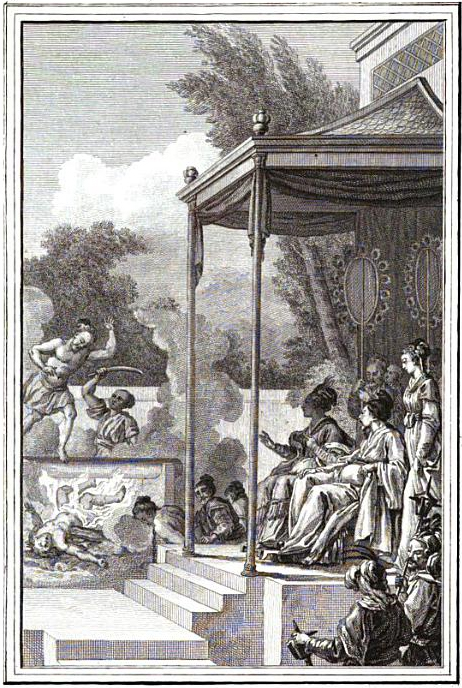
Di Xin and his consort Daji as depicted in Faits mémorables des empereurs de la Chine, tirés des annales chinoises (1788)

Daji was from a noble family of Yousu (有蘇); her style name is Da (妲), and her clan name is Ji (己). Hence, she is also known as Su Da Ji or Da Ji in ancient sources. Early in his reign, Di Xin invaded Yousu and took Daji as his prize. Di Xin soon became besotted with her and his infatuation led to prolific and wasteful spending, which in turn required further taxation.

The opponents of Di Xin's rule believed that Daji was to blame for many ills affecting the kingdom. And so, after the fall of the Shang dynasty, Daji was executed on the orders of King Wu of Zhou on the advice of Jiang Ziya. The Grand Historian, Sima Qian, only briefly mentions Daji and her execution, that Di Xin had listened only to Daji, and that she was killed after Di Xin. According to Han scholar Liu Xiang's Biographies of Exemplary Women, following her death, her head was hung on a small white flag to symbolize how she had become the downfall of the dynasty. She had become King Wu's excuse for taking over the kingdom, and, as such, the government was renewed following her death. Other sources state that she committed suicide by strangulation.

=== Daji as a mythical fox ===
From the Southern and Northern Dynasties period on, Daji was believed to be an incarnation of a nine-tailed fox.

Daji had many shrines associated with her in fox form. The shrines dedicated to her were considered illicit cults and as such, banned.

While not related directly to one source, the creation of foot binding is associated with Daji as well. It is said that Daji created foot binding to hide her fox feet. As the other women did not know why she wrapped her feet, the other ladies at court imitated her.

== Literature ==
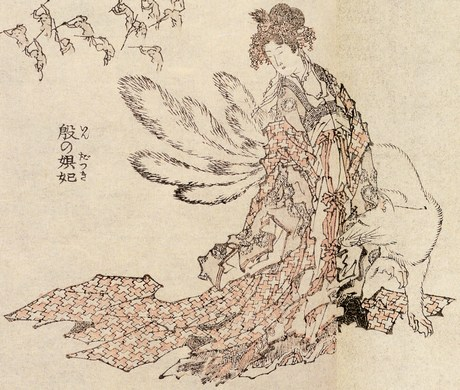
Depiction of Daji in the Hokusai Manga

Daji is featured in the Chinese novel Fengshen Yanyi as a major antagonist. She was the first featured as the corrupter of the declining Shang dynasty in the novel. She was summoned by Nüwa, the celestial sovereign, to destroy King Zhou. In return, Nüwa promised immortality after her mission was finished. In Fengshen Yanyi, she was a daughter of Su Hu (蘇護); in the early chapters, she was killed by a thousand-year-old fox spirit who possessed her body before becoming a concubine of Di Xin. Her father Su Hu gave her to him as an appeasement offer after armed conflict broke out between Su's and Shang military forces.

One night before, Daji was sent to the capital city of Zhaoge, and she was possessed by an evil nine-tailed fox spirit (aka Thousand-Year-Old Vixen). When Daji arrived in Zhaoge, she became the center of attention of Di Xin and caused the king to be extremely obsessed with her. Di Xin neglected state affairs to keep her company and ignored the advice of his subjects. Yunzhongzi was the first man to act against Daji by giving the king a magical peach-wood sword which would make Daji ill and eventually kill her. She rose above the ranks from a minor concubine to become the queen based on the king's favoritism towards her.

Daji was blamed for the fall of the Shang dynasty by corrupting Di Xin and causing him to neglect state affairs and rule with tyranny and despotism. This ultimately led to the dynasty's decline and widespread chaos. Di Xin's tyranny incurred the anger and resentment of the common people, who eventually rose up in revolt against him under King Wu of Zhou's leadership. After the fall of the Shang dynasty, Daji was exorcised by Jiang Ziya (aka Jiang Taigong) and eventually died.

In Renshi Zuan, Daji is paranoid about others finding out her secret of being a fox. As such, she escalates to violence and kills until the king is the only one who does not know. In most literature involving Daji, there is some reason as to why she cannot be killed in human form, since she is too beautiful. In Fengshen Yanyi, a magical weapon is required to kill her. In Wang Fa Zhou Pingua, a mirror is used to expose and destroy her. In this piece of literature, Daji's true form was a nine-tailed fox with a woman's face.

In Zhaoyang Qushi, a Ming dynasty novel, Daji is a fox spirit who leaves heaven. She was unhappy after her time on Earth, so she left again for the Earth to make a fox kingdom.

== See also ==
- Bao Si
- Bo Yikao
- Femme fatale
- Jade Pipa
- Jiutou Zhiji Jing
- Nüwa
- Tamamo-no-Mae
- Dal-Gi

== Sources ==
- Chen, Ya-chen - Women in Chinese martial arts films of the new millennium narrative analyses and gender politics (2012) - ISBN 9780739139103
- Epstein, Maram - Competing discourses: Orthodoxy, authenticity, and endangered meanings in late Imperial Chinese fiction (2001) - ISBN 9780674005129
- Huntington, Rania - Alien kind: foxes and late imperial Chinese narrative (2003) - ISBN 9780674010949
- Kang, Xiaofei - The cult of the fox: Power, gender, and popular religion in late imperial and modern China (2006) - ISBN 9780231133388.
- Lin, Fu-shih - Modern Chinese Religion I - ISBN 9789004271647.
- Xu, Zhonglin - Fengshen Yanyi (16th century)
