= Xu Zhonglin (novelist) =

Chinese novelist (16th century)

- Traditional Chinese: 許仲琳
- Simplified Chinese: 许仲琳
Transcriptions
Standard Mandarin
- Hanyu Pinyin: Xǔ Zhònglín
- Wade–Giles: Hsü Chung-lin
- Yale Romanization: Syǔ Jùng-Lín

Xu Zhonglin (traditional Chinese: 許仲琳; simplified Chinese: 许仲琳; died 1560s) was a Chinese writer who lived during the Ming dynasty. Little is known of his life. He is best known as the author of the 16th century semi-mythical novel Investiture of the Gods (封神演義; Fengshen Yanyi). There is considerable doubt as to his authorship of the work.

== Life ==
Xu was likely born in Yingtian, present-day Nanjing. His death has been dated to the 1560s. Little is known about Xu's life. Conventional wisdom of Qing scholars held that the author of Investiture of the Gods was likely a famous scholar in his time period and that the work may have been part of a dowry payment for his daughter.

== Investiture of the Gods ==
The earliest extant copy of Investiture of the Gods is held in the Japanese Library of the Grand Secretariat, printed by Shu Zaiyang and dated to the reign of the Wanli Emperor, between 1573 and 1619. The second section of the book is inscribed with the words "compiled by Xu Zhonglin, the Old Recluse of Mount Zhong." This is likely the source of his possible pseudonym "Zhongshan Yisou" (鍾山逸叟), which literally means "a carefree old man living in Mount Zhong". The authorship of the book was undetermined until the 20th century, when Chinese literary scholar Sun K'ai'ti discovered the Shu printing, with the attribution to Xu. While Xu is often credited as the author of the book, there is considerable doubt in both its authorship and original publication date.

Crediting the book to Xu, Lu Xun unfavorably contrasted the book with "the realism of Shui-hu Chuan and the imaginative brilliance of the Pilgrimage to the West", reflecting its lesser position in the canon of Ming-era literature. While some historians believed the book was popularly consumed in its original era, Yale University academic Tina Lu noted that it would have been prohibitively expensive for most consumers, being more than twice the price of a well-apportioned encyclopedia.

=== Authorship ===
University of Hong Kong academic Mark Meulenbeld identifies Lu Xun as a primary catalyst for the conventional belief that Xu authored the work, basing his contention on Xu's credit in the Shu Zaiyang printing. Liu Ts'un-yan rejected Xu as a major creative force behind the work, noting that the Shu printing notably does not include Xu's name on the frontispiece and lists him with Shu Zaiyang's credit for the printing, reflecting a more clerical contribution by Xu. For his part, Zhang Henshui compared Xu's role to the compiler of Water Margin and argued that Xu likely worked as a re-editor of Investiture, who drew from lost precedential works like the 14th century story "King Wu's Campaign against Chou". Liu wrote that:

this so called earliest edition of Feng Shen which we have at present can never be claimed as the "earliest" edition engraved from the manuscript of its author, and the man [Xu Zhonglin] likewise, could, therefore, not have been its author.

Liu instead argued instead that the author was likely Lu Xixing, a Daoist priest who lived contemporaneously with Xu and wrote multiple Daoist and Buddhist works. In an essay accompanying a 1991 reprint, Fudan University literary scholar Zhang Peiheng rejected both Liu Ts'un-yan and Lu Xun's views, believing instead that the book likely dated to the 1600s at the earliest, meaning neither Lu Xixing nor Xu Zhonglin would be its primary author. Meulenbeld, reviewing the different arguments, concluded that Xu Zhonglin likely only "compiled" the original version, consisting "of local, sacred histories [. . .] [which] already existed in dramatic versions before the printing of the novel." Some traditional belief on Taiwan and in twentieth-century Beijing held that 14th century scholar Liu Bowen was the work's original creator.

== See also ==
- Chinese literature
