= Fei Zhong =

Fei Zhong 費仲
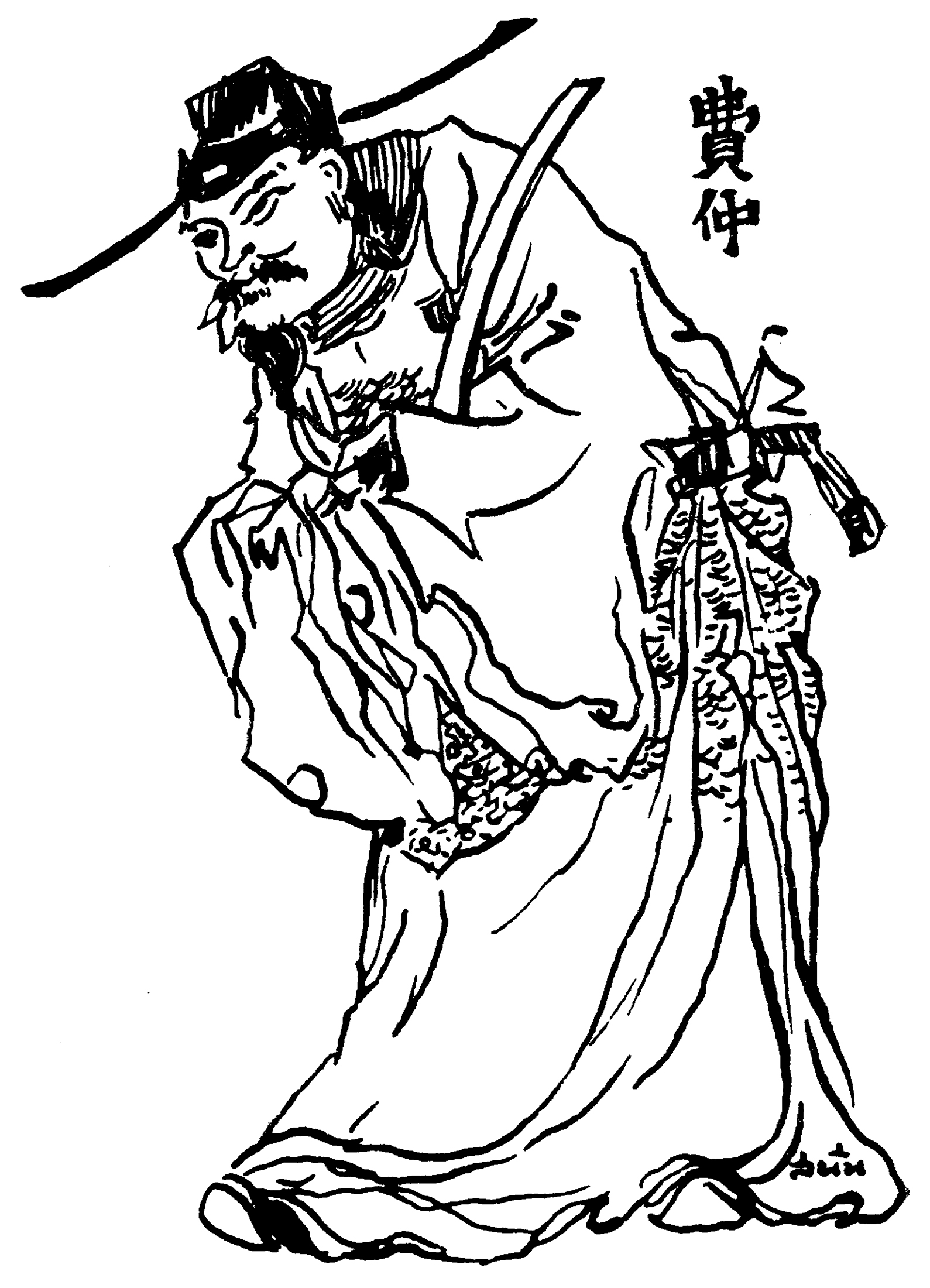
- 1963 illustration based on Fei Zhong's appearance in Fengshen Yanyi
- Died: c. 1046 BCE; Muye, Shang dynasty
- Known for: Serving Di Xin
- Children: Disputed: Elai Ge; Ji Sheng (季勝)
- Military career
- Allegiance: Shang dynasty
- Conflicts: Battle of Muye †
- Monarch: Di Xin

Chinese name
- Traditional Chinese: 費仲
- Simplified Chinese: 费仲
Transcriptions
Standard Mandarin
- Hanyu Pinyin: Fèi Zhòng

Fei Zhong (費仲) was a minister for Di Xin during the Late Shang period of the Shang dynasty. Little is known about him outside of posthumous accounts in the Chinese classics, seemingly being absent from oracle bones.

== Traditional historiography ==
In Records of the Grand Historian, Fei Zhong is recorded as the man to accept San Yisheng and Hong Yao's bargaining for the release of King Wen of Zhou after he was imprisoned; the two offered a woman of the Youshen clan (有莘氏), fine horses, and rare curios in exchange for King Wen's freedom. This came during a plot in which King Wen plotted to overthrow Di Xin following a report from Marquess Hu of Chong. Di Xin was surprised at the offer, and not only released King Wen, but also bestowed him with weaponry in the interests of him going on military expeditions once more, something Predynastic Zhou had done to defend Shang before. Despite this, the plot continued.

Han Fei expands on the above narrative in Han Feizi, where Fei Zhong is recorded as hailing the virtue of King Wen, but noting that he would become a threat to Shang if his plot continued. However, Di Xin refused to execute him, and after three attempts to reason with the ruler, it was too late, and Shang fell to King Wu. He also portrays Fei Zhong's reception of King Wen's goods differently: He implies that King Wen had employed Fei Zhong to confuse Di Xin's mind and that led to his downfall, having accepted a jade tablet from him as a gift whereas Jiao Ge (膠鬲), another minister, could not obtain it. King Wen's support of Fei Zhong, then, was made with the knowledge that his coveting of curios would corrupt the state further, making it easier to overthrow.

Fei Zhong would command a large army during the Battle of Muye, but would ultimately be defeated and killed on the battlefield along with his son, Elai Ge, by the army of King Wu of Zhou, continuing his father's legacy. The Shang dynasty would be overthrown, bringing about the Western Zhou period.

== Family ==
Fei Zhong was a descendent of Zhongyan, a minister for Tai Wu. Qianfu Lun said his two sons, Elai Ge and Ji Sheng, would serve Di Xin along with him. Fei Zhong's direct male descendents, Feizi (descent from Elai Ge) and Zaofu (descent from Ji Sheng), would go on to found the State of Qin and State of Zhao, respectively. But Shiji said Elai Ge and Ji Sheng were sons of Fei Lian, not Fei Zhong, Fei Lian was the son of Zhongjue.

== Legacy ==
Mozi contrasts Fei Zhong with Weizi of Song and Jizi; whereas he was a terror to the world, Weizi and Jizi were the sages of their day. He makes a further point, stating that they spoke the same language: Therefore, regardless of tongue, one can use it for good or evil.

=== In fiction ===
Fei Zhong is portrayed as the uncle of Daji, the semi-legendary consort of Di Xin whose sadism corrupted him, in Investiture of the Gods.
