= Hong Yao (Western Zhou) =

Chinese Zhou dynasty official

- Known for: Serving King Wen and King Wu of Zhou.
- Military career
- Allegiance: Predynastic Zhou
- Conflicts: Battle of Muye
- Monarchs: King Wen of Zhou; King Wu of Zhou

Chinese name
- Traditional Chinese: 閎夭
- Simplified Chinese: 闳夭
Transcriptions
Standard Mandarin
- Hanyu Pinyin: Hóng Yāo

Hong Yao (閎夭) was one of five major ministers for King Wen and King Wu of Zhou during the Predynastic Zhou, Battle of Muye, and Western Zhou periods of Chinese history.

== Name ==
Excavated texts, such as Chenliang (良臣), have given Hong Yao's name as Nangong Yao (南宫夭), though whether these are the same person is under slight debate given evidence from bronze inscriptions on Bianzhong bells.

== Traditional historiography ==
Hong Yao served King Wen of Zhou during a tumultuous time in the Late Shang period, and was one of five ministers held in especially high esteem; the others were San Yisheng, Tai Dian, Nangong Kuo, and Guo Shu (虢叔). However, this varies by account. Di Xin had allegedly grown fixated with alcohol, lust, and was growing increasingly incapable of governing his nation. Predynastic Zhou, a vassal state for Shang, spent time defending Di Xin's state whilst he would go to war against Dongyi states to maintain hegemony, which cost the overall dynasty greatly. King Wen, dissatisfied, plotted to overthrow Di Xin, and was imprisoned following Marquess Hu of Chong reporting it to him. Together with San Yisheng, Hong Yao procured a woman from the Youshen clan (有莘氏), rare curiosities, and effective horses, and offered them in tribute to Di Xin through Fei Zhong in exchange for their leader's release, to which he complied, and gave King Wen weapons to continue his own military expeditions. However, King Wen was undeterred in his plot, and continued picking off states over time, including the State of Chong.

Eventually, King Wen died, and King Wu of Zhou would take his place, still continuing the plot to overthrow Di Xin. Hong Yao submitted to King Wu and continued his service. Eventually, King Wu was ready to sack Shang, and, together with his ministers, led a fierce battle at the Battle of Muye and defeated Di Xin, bringing his dynasty to an end. Hong Yao and the other four ministers flanked King Wu as he made a sacrifice at the Shang shrine. The Lost Book of Zhou records that Hong Yao, along with San Yisheng and Tai Dian, held small lǚ (呂) flutes as he performed his ritual. He was also ordered by King Wu to seal the tomb of Bi Gan, who had allegedly been killed by Di Xin, though this is disputed.
