= Tai Dian =

Chinese Zhou dynasty official

- Known for: Serving King Wen and King Wu of Zhou.
- Military career
- Allegiance: Predynastic Zhou
- Conflicts: Battle of Muye
- Monarchs: King Wen of Zhou; King Wu of Zhou

Chinese name
- Traditional Chinese: 泰顛
- Simplified Chinese: 太颠
Transcriptions
Standard Mandarin
- Hanyu Pinyin: Tài Diān

Tai Dian (泰顛) was one of five major ministers for King Wen and King Wu of Zhou during the Predynastic Zhou, Battle of Muye, and Western Zhou periods of Chinese history.

== Traditional historiography ==
During the Late Shang period, the dynasty's final ruler, Di Xin, was allegedly degenerating. He was said to have become fixated with alcohol and lust, and was seen as an incompetent ruler. King Wen plotted to overthrow Di Xin following an astrological event, which brought about the idea of the Mandate of Heaven. Mozi states that it was at this time that Tai Dian would be elevated to his ministerial position, after he was found catching rabbits with net traps. Tai Dian then became one of the "Four Friends of King Wen" (四友) along with Hong Yao, San Yisheng, and Nankong Kuo. Guo Shu (虢叔) is added to this list in the Book of Documents. Together, they served Predynastic Zhou; Mozi states that during this time, Zhou culture flourished, with farmers and artisans alike bolstering each other's virtue. This was allegedly akin to that of the days of Tang of Shang's promotion of Yi Yin. However, Marquess Hu of Chong would tell Di Xin of King Wen's plot to betray him, resulting in his imprisonment. After his release with the help of San Yisheng and Hong Yao, the plot continued.

Sometime after defeating Marquess Hu's State of Chong, King Wen died. King Wu of Zhou was then enthroned and the plot to overthrow Di Xin continued. This culminated in the Battle of Muye, which led to a complete and utter defeat of the Shang dynasty. King Wu then went to make a sacrifice at the Shang temple, which the Lost Book of Zhou records as having Tai Dian, along with San Yisheng and Hong Yao, holding small lǚ (呂) flutes as King Wu performed it.

== Historicity ==
Some scholars, starting with the Song dynasty scholar Wu Renjie (吴仁杰), believe that Tai Dian was a scribal error and he was actually Jiang Ziya, often known as Tai Gong Wang (太公望). This would pick up during Qing dynasty commentaries. Modern commentaries occasionally note this, but the designation is nevertheless disputed.
