= Li gui (vessel) =

Ancient Chinese bronze artifact 利簋

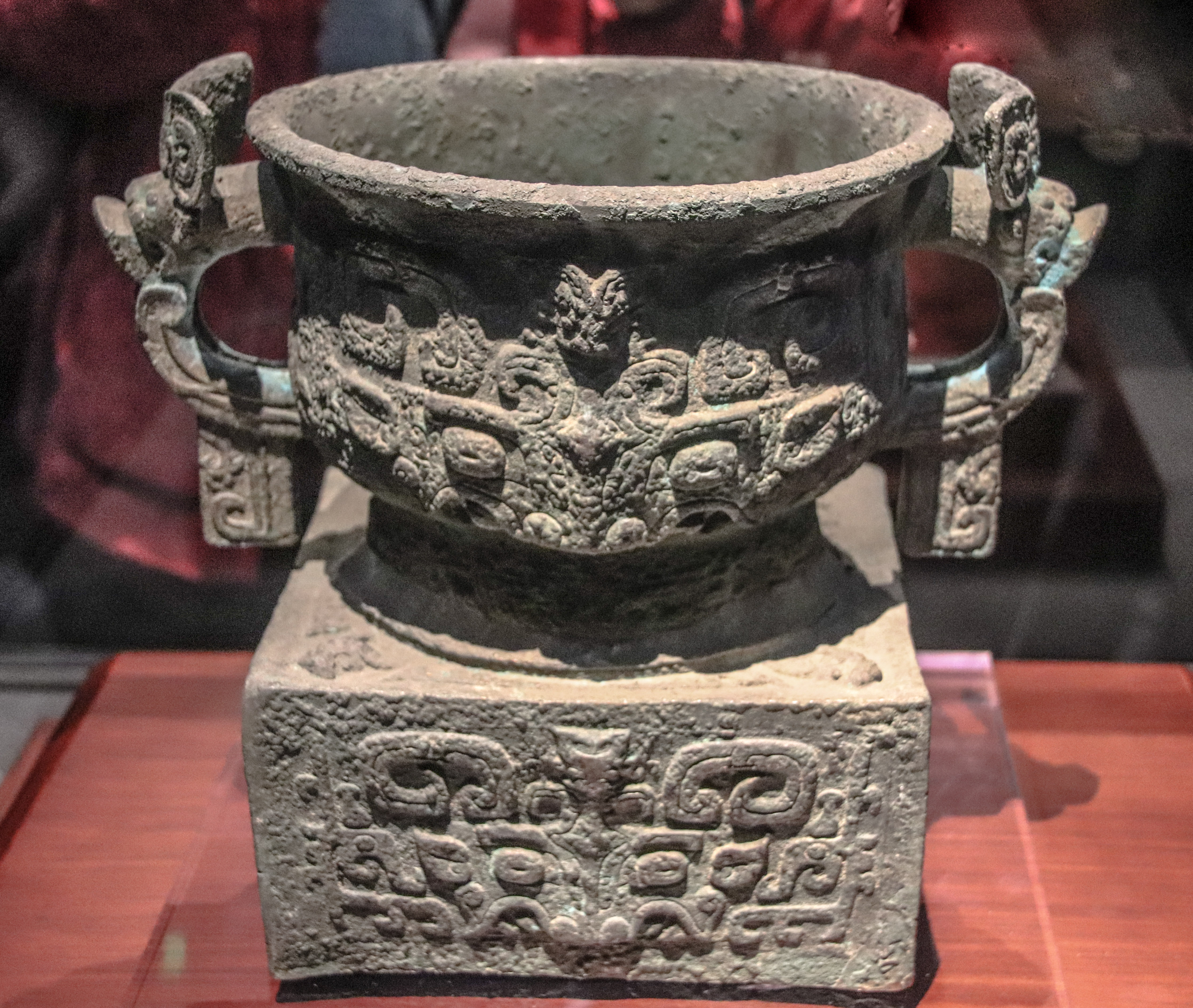
- Material: Bronze
- Height: 28 cm
- Created: c. 1046 BC
- Discovered: 1976; Shaanxi, China
- Present location: Beijing, China

The Li gui (Chinese: 利簋) is an ancient Chinese bronze sacrificial gui vessel cast by an early Zhou dynasty official.

== Description ==
It is one of the earliest Zhou bronze vessels to be discovered, the earliest record of metal being given as a gift by the king, one of only two vessels dateable to the reign of King Wu of Zhou to record personal names, and the only epigraphic evidence of the day of the Zhou conquest of Shang. This makes the Li gui important to the periodisation of the Shang and Zhou dynasties.

== Appearance ==
A round vessel on a square pedestal, the Li gui measures 28 centimeters high; the mouth of the vessel has a diameter of 22 centimeters. It has two bird-shaped handles and is covered with a high-relief taotie motif similar to earlier Shang ritual objects. It was excavated in 1976 in Lintong district, Shaanxi, and was kept for a time in the Lintong County Museum, before being transferred to the National Museum of China in Beijing, where it now resides. In 2002, it was listed among the cultural artefacts prohibited from leaving Chinese soil.

== Inscription ==
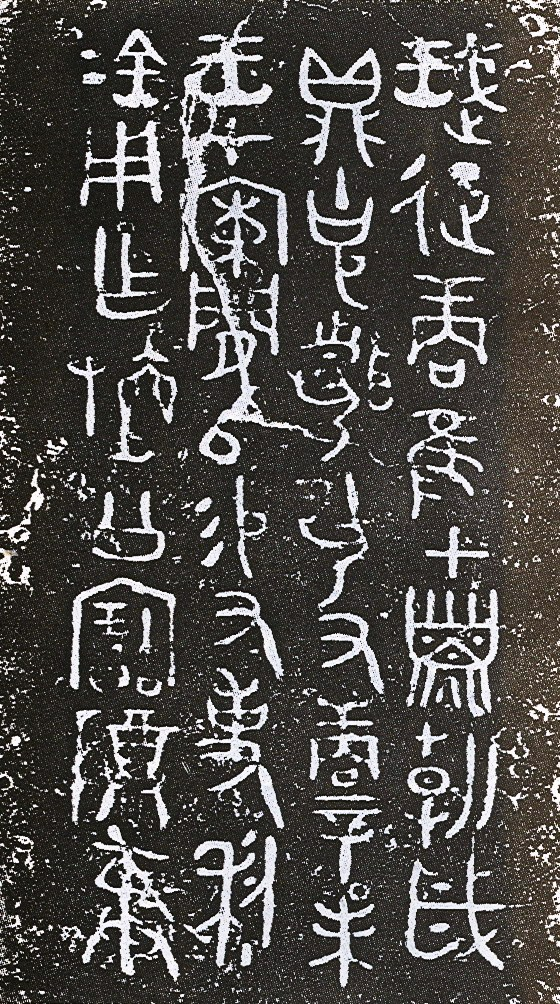
Inscription on the Li gui

The Li gui is inscribed with thirty-two characters commemorating King Wu of Zhou's conquest of Shang. Transcribed into modern-day regular script, with archaic phonetic loans and digraphs given in parentheses, the full inscription reads:

珷(武王)征商隹(唯)甲子朝歲
鼎(貞)克昏(聞)夙又(有)商辛未
王才(在)管師易(賜)又(右)吏利
金用乍(作)旜公寶尊彝

The inscription begins:

King Wu attacked Shang. It was the morning of jiazi (day 1).

King Wu's name thus recorded on a contemporary vessel supports the theory that the early Zhou kings were called by the same titles in life as they were after their deaths, unlike later Chinese monarchs. The day designation within the sexagenary cycle accords with that given for the decisive Battle of Muye by the Shi Fu (世俘, "capture of the world") chapter of the Yi Zhou Shu, and the Mu Shi (牧誓, "Oath at Muye") chapter of the Book of Documents.

There is no scholarly consensus on the meaning of the next seven graphs, beginning with sui (歲, at the end of the first line), which is variously interpreted as the name of a ritual or as a reference to the planet Jupiter. Renderings of this portion of the inscription range from "Jupiter was in the correct position, letting the King know he would conquer, and soon he controlled Shang" to "The King performed the sui and ding sacrifices, letting it be known that he could rout the ruler of Shang."

Following the problematic passage, the inscription concludes:

On xinwei (day 8), the King was at Jian encampment. He granted his youshi Li metal, with which he makes this treasured ritual vessel for his esteemed ancestor Zhan.

This indicates that the caster of the vessel may have been a participant in the Battle of Muye.
