= Elai Ge =

Elai Ge 惡來革
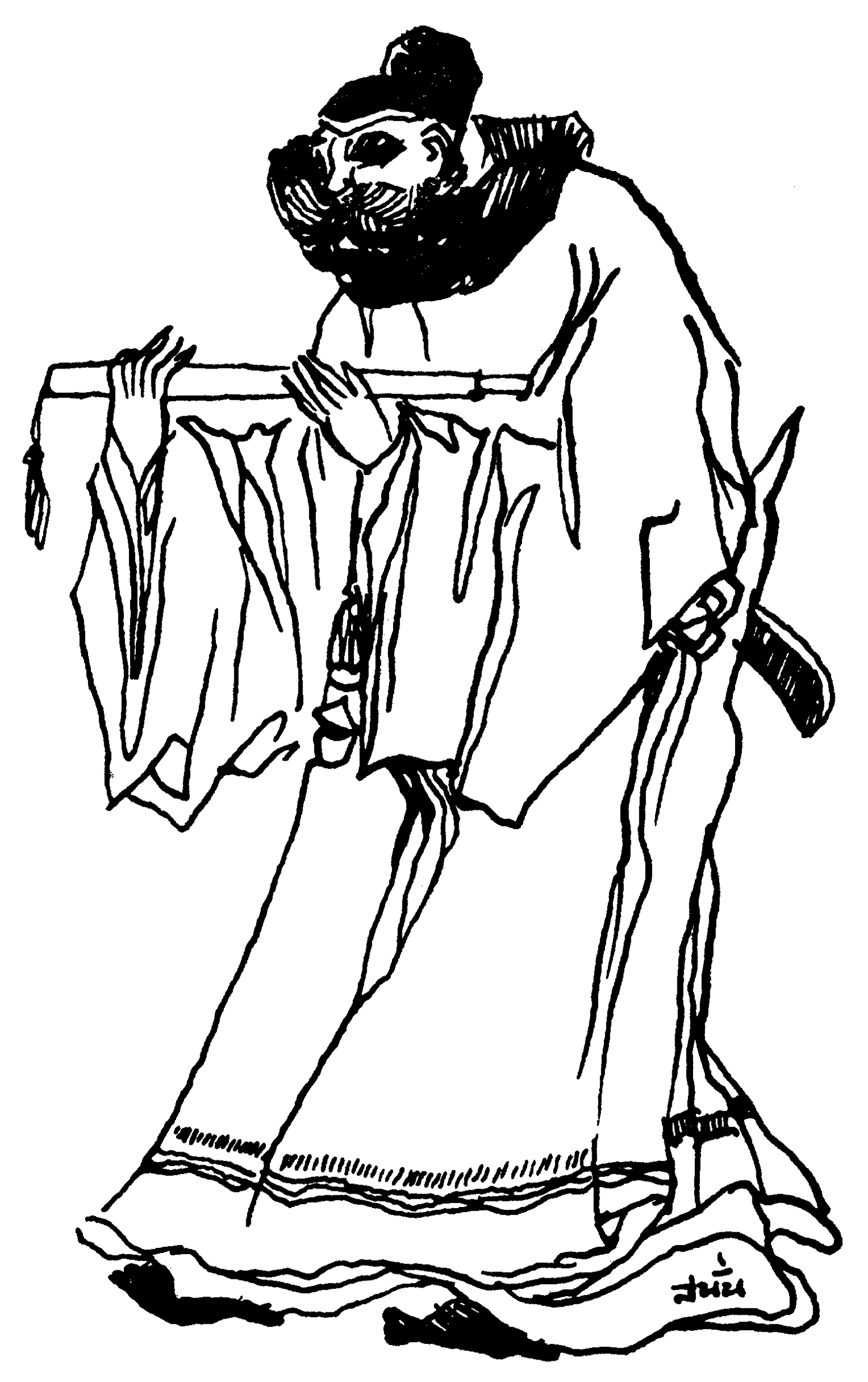
- 1963 illustration based on Elai's appearance in Fengshen Yanyi
- Died: c. 1046 BCE; Muye, Shang dynasty
- Known for: Serving Di Xin
- Father: Fei Lian (son of Zhongjue) or Fei Zhong
- Military career
- Allegiance: Shang dynasty
- Conflicts: Battle of Muye †
- Monarch: Di Xin

Chinese name
- Traditional Chinese: 惡來革
- Simplified Chinese: 恶来革
Transcriptions
Standard Mandarin
- Hanyu Pinyin: èlái gé

Elai Ge (Chinese: 惡來革; pinyin: Èlái Gé), often simply Elai, was a minister and bodyguard for Di Xin during the Late Shang dynasty.

He was the ancestor of Qin founder Feizi, his younger brother Ji Sheng was the ancestor of Zhao founder Zhao Ji.

== Name ==
Elai's name is highly unusual and not commonly seen in Chinese. Citing Late Shang naming practices, Lu Guoquan argues that È (惡) was a corruption of Yà (亞), given their minute differences. Therefore, they surmise that their actual name was Ya Lai (亞來).

亞 in small seal script.

惡 in small seal script.

亞 in bronze script.

亞 in oracle bone script.

== Ancestry ==
Elai was a direct male descendant of Zhongyan, who served Tai Wu, and ancestor of Feizi, the founder of the State of Qin. His father, Fei Lian, had another son, named Ji Sheng (季勝), who was an ancestor of Zaofu, the ancestor of the Zhao clan's leader. Fei Lian was the son of Zhongjue.

Qianfu Lun said he and his brother Ji Sheng were sons of Fei Zhong.

== Life ==
According to the Records of the Grand Historian (Shiji) by Sima Qian, Elai was known for his immense physical strength and would often villify those they disliked. Mozi also mentions this, adding that Di Xin himself, as well as Marquess Hu of Chong, also possessed such strength.

Wei Liaozi mentions that Elai, along with Feilian, participated in the Battle of Muye as a commander of extremely large forces. Sima Qian claims that Elai was killed by King Wu of Zhou during the war, dying young, which is also mentioned in Shuo Yuan.

== Legacy ==
Elai is frequently cited in classical texts, such as Xunzi, as a corrupt minister whose influence on their ruler would lead to the downfall of a state.

In the historical novel Romance of the Three Kingdoms by Luo Guanzhong, Cao Cao, impressed with Dian Wei's strength, states "This is old Elai again." Thus this fictional nickname of Dian Wei stuck with him, and he was henceforth known as "Elai" Dian Wei.
