= Nangong Kuo (Western Zhou) =

- 南宮适
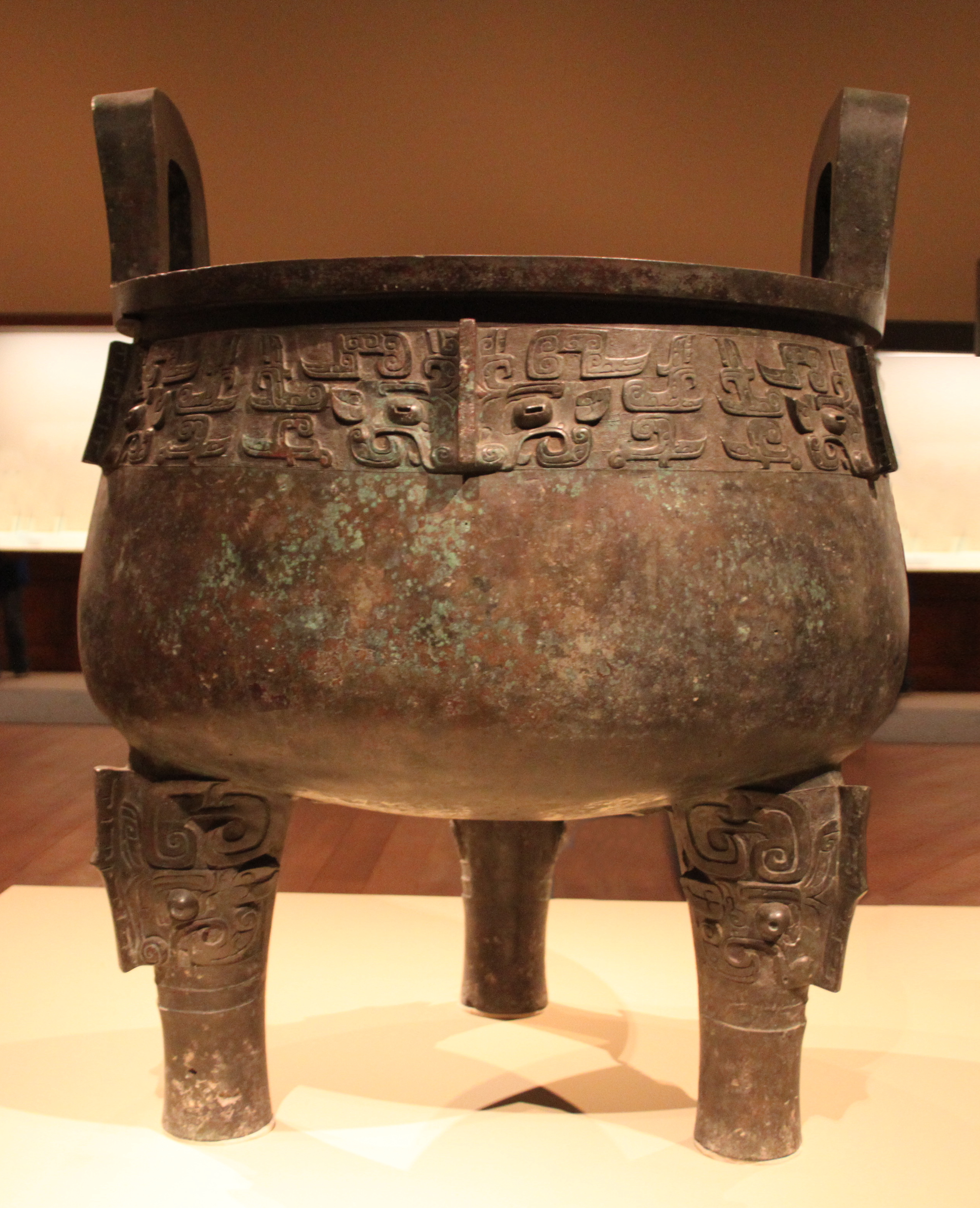
- The Da Yu ding, made in dedication to Nangong Kuo.
- Known for: Serving King Wen and King Wu of Zhou.
- Military career
- Allegiance: Predynastic Zhou
- Conflicts: Battle of Muye
- Monarchs: King Wen of Zhou; King Wu of Zhou; King Cheng of Zhou

Chinese name
- Chinese: 南宮适
Transcriptions

Nangong Kuo (Chinese: 南宮适; pinyin: Nángōng Kuò; fl. 11th century BC) was a top official of King Wen of Zhou during the late Shang and early Western Zhou dynasties.

== In the Chinese classics ==
In the "Jun Shi" (君奭) chapter of the Book of Documents, the Duke of Zhou names Nangong Kuo as one of the five key advisers of King Wen, together with Hong Yao, Tai Dian, Guo Shu (虢叔), and San Yisheng. After King Wen's death, Nangong Kuo became a key adviser of his son King Wu.

After the Battle of Muye, Nangong Kuo was given three orders by King Wu: Redistribute wealth from Deer Terrace Pavilion (鹿臺), release the grain from Juqiao (鉅橋), and inspect the Nine Tripod Cauldrons for any damage. This was in the interests of relieving pressure on the Shang commoners. Upon King Wu's death, Nangong Kuo would continue serving King Cheng of Zhou in his infancy, and this service would continue into his official regency. He would notably defend Duke Dan of Zhou and King Cheng's establishment of Chengzhou (成周) following critique from Xin Kuan (辛寬). Xin Kuan had criticised the move as reducing Zhou's natural defences, as there were less tall mountains and rivers than in the Qishan Mountains. Nangong Kuo responded by stating that the move was an example of rule by innate, moral power, and that relying on the dangerous mountains and rivers was unsustainable.

== Bronze inscriptions ==
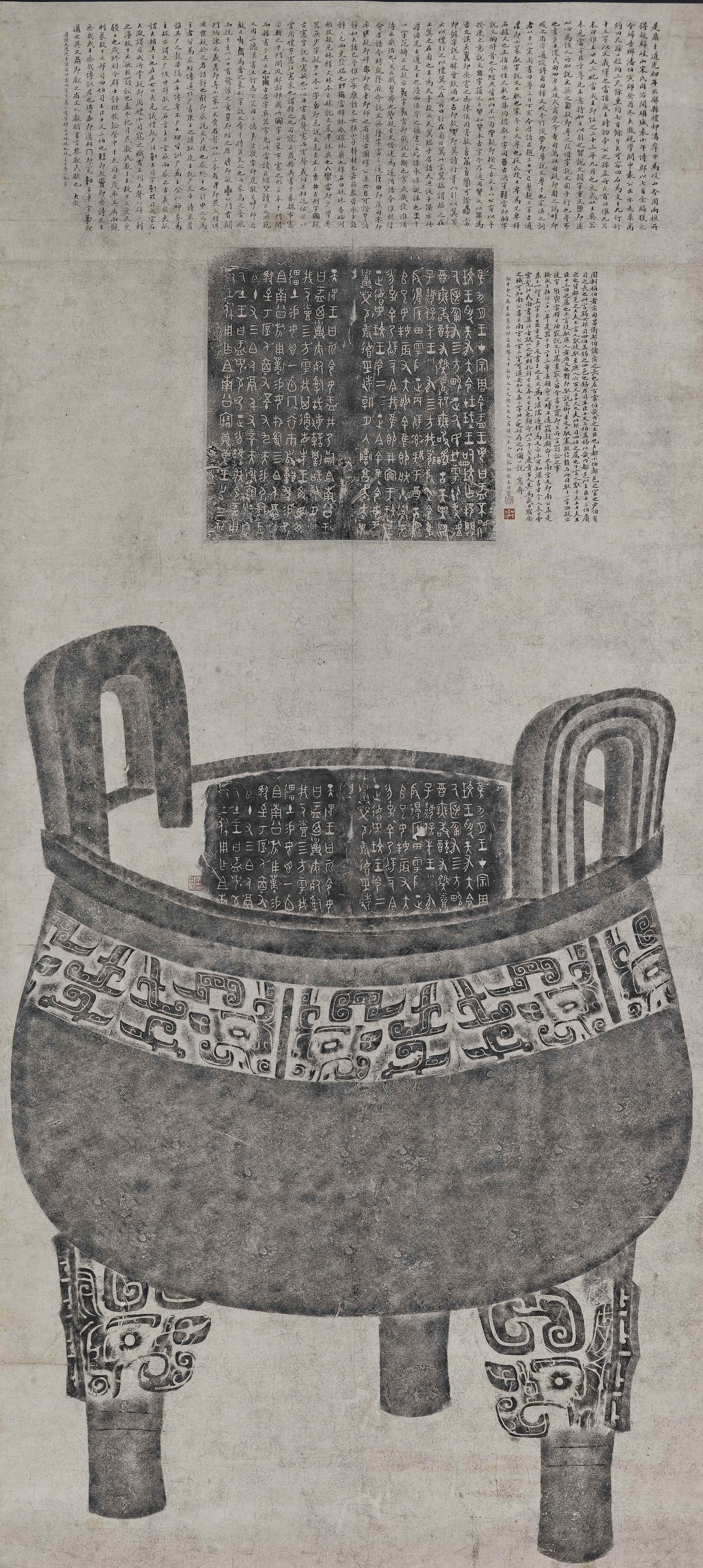
Sketch of the Da Yu ding, featuring a rubbing of its inscription.

Nangong Kuo was the founder of a major aristocratic lineage of the Western Zhou. His eldest son probably died early, and his second son Nangong Mao (南宫毛) inherited his title. The famous Da Yu ding, now a national treasure of China, was cast by Nangong Kuo's grandson Yu (盂), and dedicated to him. The bronze inscription on the vessel traces Yu's lineage back to Nangong (南公, Duke of Nan), who is identified by scholars, including Li Xueqin and Li Feng, with Nangong Kuo. Inscriptions on other unearthed bronze vessels indicate that during the late Western Zhou period, the Nangong lineage continued to produce important military leaders like Nangong Liu, and civil administrators such as Nangong Hu, Supervisor of Land.

Inscriptions on excavated bronzes from the tombs of the marquises of Zeng in Hubei Province indicate that Kang (犺) of the Nangong clan was enfeoffed with the Zeng state by either King Cheng or King Kang of Zhou. Kang, the first Marquis of Zeng, was either Nangong Kuo's son or great-grandson (Yu's son).

== In fiction ==
Nangong Kuo is a character in the Ming dynasty classic novel Fengshen Yanyi. In this novel, Nangong Kuo is a renowned general that had loyally served under Ji Chang (King Wen of Zhou) of Mount Singing Phoenix. Nangong generally seems to be more of an aggressive individual, and will rush to rather impulsive conclusions at times. Following the death of Ji Chang's first son, Bo Yikao, Nangong would swear eternal revenge against King Zhou. Due to Nangong's continuous lust to attack Zhaoge at any possible moment, San Yisheng develops a negative liking towards him.

Following King Wen's attack upon Tiger Town, the capital of Chong Houhu, Nangong is the first to charge the gates of the capital. When General Huang Yuanji stands before him, Nangong yells, "Huang Yuanji, you small potato, get out of my way! I only want to fight the real Chong Houhu himself!" With these words, Nangong, with his great knife, cuts Huang Yuanji down with relative ease. Later on following General Zhang Guifang's attack upon Phoenix City during the Huang Feihu retrieval arc, Nangong duels it out against Vanguard Feng Lin. After defeating Feng with great ease, he is captured by Feng's magic technique; only later due to Nezha's assistance would he be saved.
