= San Yisheng =

Chinese Zhou dynasty official

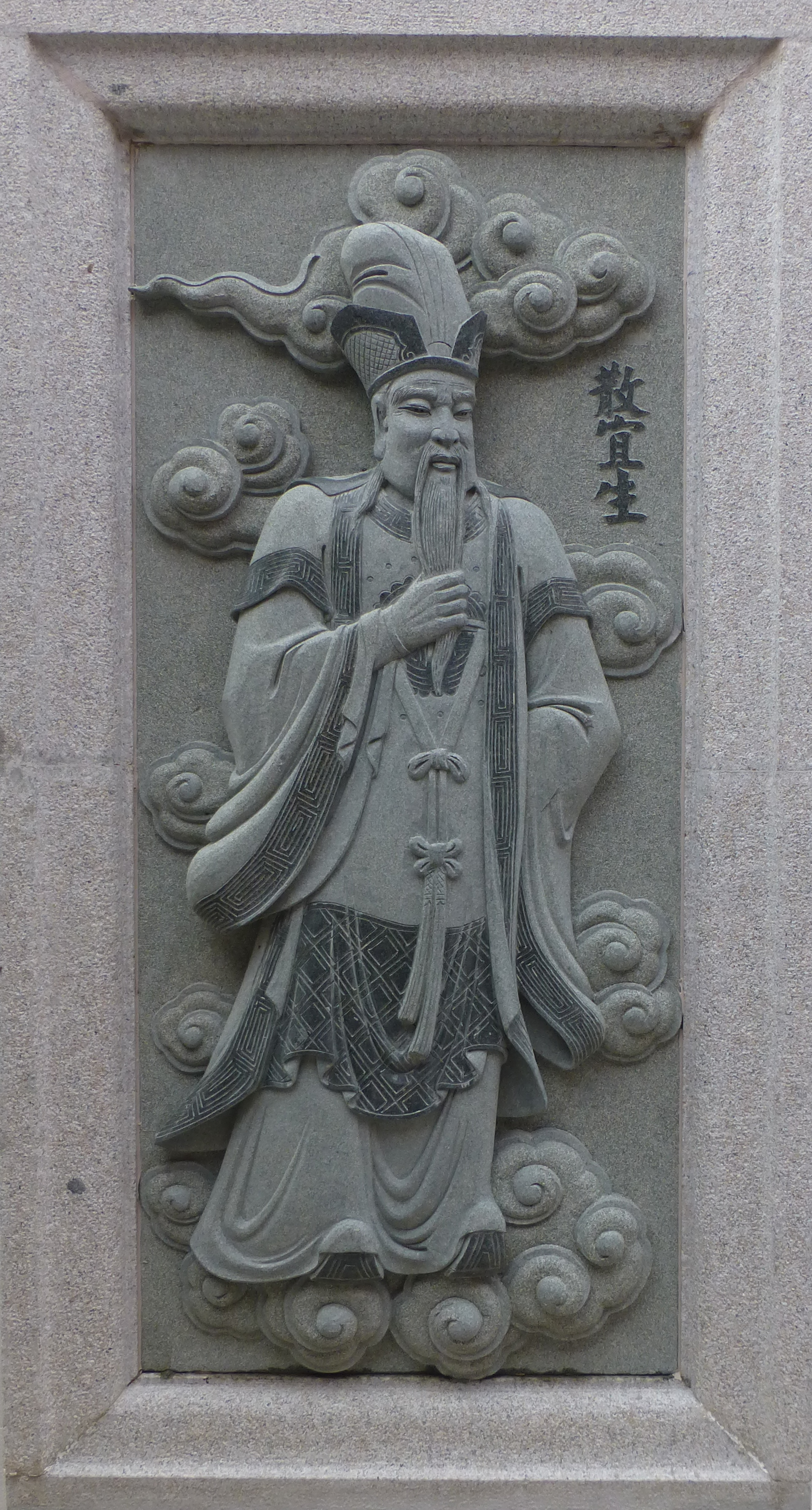
- At Ping Sien Si Temple in Malaysia.
- Known for: Serving King Wen and King Wu of Zhou.
- Military career
- Allegiance: Predynastic Zhou
- Conflicts: Battle of Muye
- Monarchs: King Wen of Zhou; King Wu of Zhou; King Cheng of Zhou

Chinese name
- Chinese: 散宜生
Transcriptions
Standard Mandarin
- Wade–Giles: san^{4} i^{2} sheng^{1}

San Yisheng (Chinese: 散宜生; pinyin: Sǎn Yìshēng; fl. 11th century BC) was a top official of the early Western Zhou dynasty.

== In the Chinese classics ==
San Yisheng is presented as one of several ministers for King Wen of Zhou. Hong Yao, Tai Dian, Nangong Kuo, and Guo Shu (虢叔) were his contemporaries, together forming a strong company of ministers. Recognising King Wen's character, he became his minister. As the rule of Di Xin became unbearable for the people of Predynastic Zhou, San Yisheng assisted King Wen with cultivating an innate, moral power by picking off the various tribes that assisted the Late Shang, either through elimination or allying them. Marquis Hu of Chong noticed this and told Di Xin, who would imprison King Wen.

After this, San Yisheng collected myriad treasures and riches, and offered them to Di Xin through Fei Zhong in exchange for King Wen's release. He complied and slaughtered an animal in sacrifice to mark the exchange. King Wen was then released.

King Wen would not live to see his ambition of overthrowing Di Xin come to pass, leaving his goals to the incoming King Wu. San Yisheng continued assisting King Wu, and advised that a given time would be best to attack. King Wu, considering the Mandate of Heaven, believed it was not the right time. Later, however, he found an auspicious time, and pressed on. Shuo Yuan describes San Yisheng as witnessing three omens during the journey as King Wu destroyed any way of returning to Zhouyuan (周原), to which King Wu retorted that a broken banner, a flood, and burned tortoishells are signs of Tian sending weapons. King Wu would win the eventual Battle of Muye in epic fashion, and San Yisheng would assist in guarding him as he went into the Shang temple to make a sacrifice to King Wen.

Upon King Wu's death, San Yisheng continued serving in the cabinet for King Cheng of Zhou.

== Plot in Fengshen Yanyi ==
Grand Counselor San has been renowned as the protector of both the Ji province and Ji Chang of Mount Singing Phoenix – who he has served for many upon many years. Throughout the many contributions of Commander/Grand Counselor San, he would be most remembered for subduing Chong Houhu's coalition with a simple letter of rationality during the Su Hu arc. Even after Ji Chang had been imprisoned for over the time of seven years, San Yisheng would continue to remain as a loyal sword of the Ji province.

Once the news of Bo Yikao's death had reached the ears of the people of Mount Singing Phoenix, San would be the first to console the people and create a rational conclusion. The top priority would be to retrieve Ji Chang, and not go to war against the Shang dynasty yet. Thus, San would compose a letter to Supreme Counselors Fei Zhong and You Hun and effectively attain their consent that Ji Chang should be released for his loyalty and devotion to the king.
