= Xuxuan =

Chinese legendary historical figure

Xuxuan (traditional Chinese: 胥軒; simplified Chinese: 胥轩; pinyin: Xūxuān; lit. 'Assistant of the covered chariot'), formerly romanized as Hsü-hsüan, was a legendary figure of Chinese history. He was a descendant of Bo Yi according to traditional accounts.

In the Records of the Grand Historian, Sima Qian's account of the origin of the House of Ying omits Xuxuan, simply stating that Zhongyan's great-great-grandson was Zhongjue. However, he later relates the speech of one of the marquesses of Shen, who states that "Xuxuan of the Rong" (戎胥軒, 戎胥轩, Róng Xūxuān), meaning that he was living with the Rong, was married to the daughter of one of his ancestors. This daughter of Shen was born at Mount Li (酈山, 郦山, Lìshān) and gave birth to Zhongjue. He says this was the cause of peace between the Zhou and the Rong, as well as the reason for the allegiance of Zhongjue to the Zhou kings.
