= Nine Tripod Cauldrons =

Symbols of authority in imperial China

- 九鼎
- Type: ding
- Material: bronze
- Created: Xia dynasty
- Present location: lost

The Nine Tripod Cauldrons (Chinese: 九鼎; pinyin: Jiǔ Dǐng) were a collection of ding in ancient China that were viewed as symbols of the authority given to the ruler by the Mandate of Heaven. According to its origin narrative, they were cast by Yu the Great of the Xia dynasty.

At the time of the Shang dynasty during the 2nd millennium BCE, the tripod cauldrons came to symbolize the power and authority of the ruling dynasty with strict regulations imposed as to their use. Members of the scholarly gentry class were permitted to use one or three cauldrons; the ministers of state (大夫, dàfū) five; the vassal lords seven; and only the sovereign Son of Heaven was entitled to use nine. The use of the nine tripod cauldrons to offer ritual sacrifices to the ancestors from heaven and earth was a major ceremonial occasion so that by natural progression the ding came to symbolize national political power and later to be regarded as a National Treasure. Sources state that two years after the fall of the Zhou dynasty at the hands of what would become the Qin dynasty the nine tripod cauldrons were taken from the Zhou royal palace and moved westward to the Qin capital at Xianyang. However, by the time Qin Shi Huang had eliminated the other six Warring States to become the first emperor of China in 221 BCE, the whereabouts of the nine tripod cauldrons were unknown. Sima Qian records in his Records of the Grand Historian that they were lost in the Si River to where Qin Shi Huang later dispatched a thousand men to search for the cauldrons to no avail.

== Origin ==
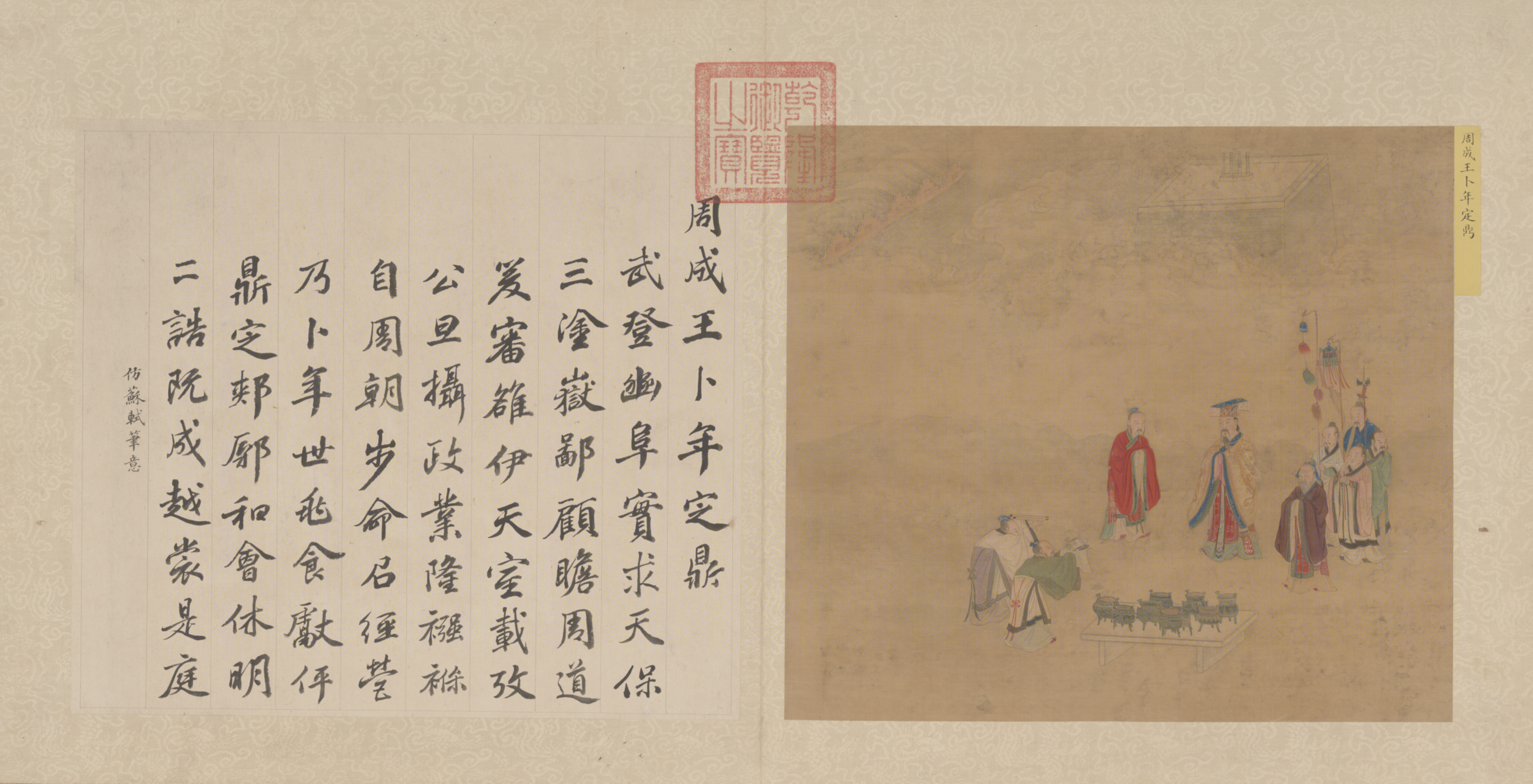
Qing dynasty painter Chen Shu's depiction of King Cheng of Zhou presented with the Nine Cauldrons.

The Records of the Grand Historian recount that once Yu the Great had finished taming the floods that once engulfed the land, he divided the territory into the Nine Provinces and collected bronze in tribute from each one. Thereafter he cast the metal into nine large tripod cauldrons. It has been said that each ding weighed around 30,000 catties equivalent to 7.5 tons. However, the Zuo Zhuan or Commentary of Zuo, states that the nine tripod cauldrons were cast by Yu the Great's son, Qi of Xia, the second Xia king, and it was he who received the tributes of bronze from the Nine Provinces. The Xia Shu (夏書) section of the Book of Documents contains the Yu Gong or "Tribute of Yu" that describes the rivers and mountains of the Nine Provinces.

== Vicissitudes of the cauldrons ==
After Tang of Shang overthrew Jie of Xia, the nine tripod cauldrons were moved to the Shang capital at Yan. Later, when the Shang king Pan Geng moved his capital to Yin (殷), the cauldrons again went with him. Following the overthrow of the Shang dynasty by the Zhou dynasty, after being inspected for damage by Nangong Kuo, the new King Wu of Zhou put the nine tripod cauldrons on public display for the first time. The Bamboo Annals state that in his 15th year of ruling the Zhou, three years after the conquest of Shang, King Wu moved the tripod cauldrons to Luo (洛).

When King Cheng of Zhou ascended the throne, the Duke of Zhou built the eastern capital of Luoyi (later Luoyang), he moved the cauldrons there, at the same time asking King Cheng to carry out their ritual installation in the settlement's Ancestral Hall (太廟).

The power of the Zhou royal family began to decline at the start of the Eastern Zhou Period in 771 BCE, with each vassal state clamoring for kingship. At the time of King Ding of Zhou (r. 605–586 BCE), King Zhuang of Chu inquired for the first time regarding the "weight of the cauldrons" (問鼎之輕重) only to be rebuffed by the Zhou minister Prince Man (王孫滿). Asking such a question was at that time a direct challenge to the power of the reigning dynasty. King Ling of Chu (r. 540–529 BCE) later again inquired of the cauldrons but was unsuccessful due to unrest sweeping the country During the reign of King Huiwen of Qin (r. 338–311 BCE), the strategist Zhang Yi formulated a plan by which he hoped to seize the Nine Tripod Cauldrons and thus gain command of the other Zhou vassal states. King Qingxiang of Chu, along with the king of the State of Qi also sought possession of the treasures as did the states of Wei and Han. The last Eastern Zhou monarch King Nan of Zhou (r. 314–256 BCE) dealt with all these rival claimants by playing them off against one another and thus kept possession of the cauldrons.

== Loss and recasting ==
After the overthrow of Zhou and the foundation of the new Qin dynasty, the Nine Tripod Cauldrons disappeared. Theories as to their fate abound with no clear agreement amongst scholars. Amongst these theories are claims that the cauldrons were:

- lost in the Si River near Pengcheng (彭城) by King Zhaoxiang of Qin (r. 306-250 BCE) en route to the Qin Capital
- stolen by Quanrong nomads following the fall of Haojing in 771 BCE;
- melted down and recast into coins or weapons in the final years of the Zhou dynasty.

According to historical records, both Qin Shi Huang and Emperor Wen of Han (r. 180–157 BCE) searched for the nine tripod cauldrons in the Si River but with no success.

Later emperors time and again recast the cauldrons, the most well known examples being Wu Zetian in the fourth month of 697 CE and the two recastings by Song dynasty Huizong Emperor in 1105 CE.

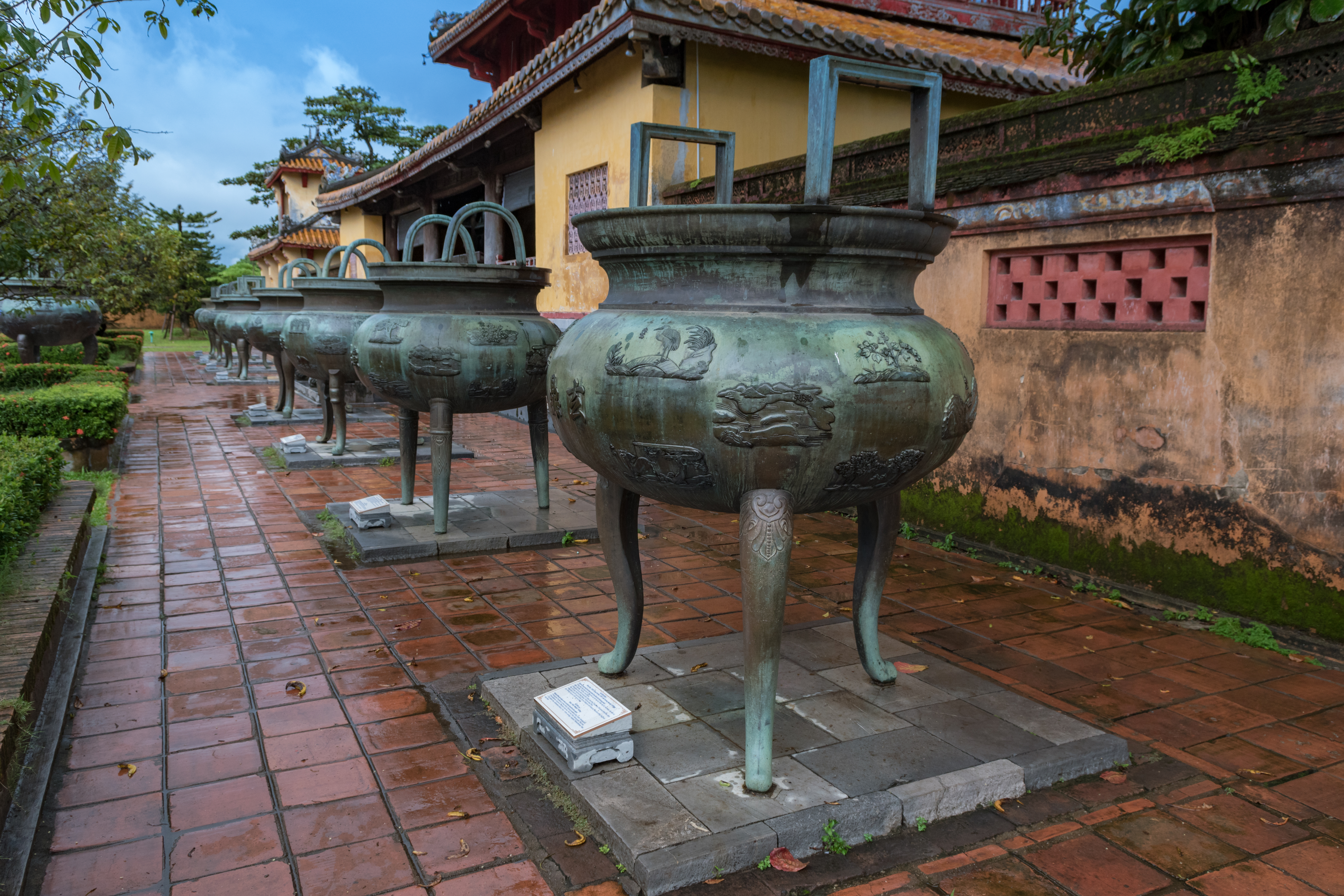
The Nine Cauldrons of the Nguyễn dynasty

Cauldrons were also cast by other dynasties in the Sinosphere, such as the Nguyễn dynasty. The Nine Cauldrons of the Nguyễn dynasty are placed in front of the Ancestral Temple (Thế Miếu) in Hue Imperial Palace.

In 2006, the National Museum of China in Beijing cast Nine Tripod Cauldrons which are now on permanent display as a tourist attraction.

== Cultural influence ==
Baopuzi mentions "Records on the Nine Cauldrons" (Jiu ding ji 九鼎記), an alleged description of the vessels commenting on their protective function.

In all Chinese speaking societies, if someone commented on someone's words as having the weight of nine tripod cauldrons (一言九鼎), this was a great compliment to the person. It meant that the person was very trustworthy and would never break their promises.

== See also ==
- Imperial Seal of China
- Tablet of Destinies (mythic item)
