= Yi Jiang =

Spouse of Chinese King Wu of Zhou

Yi Jiang (Chinese: 邑姜; pinyin: Yì Jiāng; 11th century BC), was a Chinese queen and government minister. She was married to King Wu of Zhou (r. 1046–1043 BC), founder of Zhou dynasty. She was the first queen of the Zhou dynasty. She, Fu Hao, Fu Jing, and Lady Nanzi belonged to the few politically influential women in China prior to Queen Dowager Xuan of Qin.

== Life ==
Very little is known about Yi Jiang's early life. She was the first daughter of the Great Duke of Qi, of the Lü lineage of the Jiang clan of Qi (邑姜 姜姓 呂氏), a former officer of the Shang dynasty who was given political asylum at the home of Ji Chang, Count Wen of Zhou State, when he was pursued by King Zhou of the Shang dynasty.

Yijiang married Ji Chang's second son, Ji Fa, the future King Wu, in the year of their first meeting around 1055 BC she gave birth to two children, the oldest being Ji Song, future King Cheng of Zhou (probably born in 1054 BC), the second son was Ji Yu, future Duke of Tang.

Yi Jiang belonged to the Jiang family and was born in Yi. Her marriage to Ji Fa was one of many instances of arranged marriages between members of the Ji and Jiang families, who had an old dynastic alliance. It was considered a sign of good fortune for the Zhou rulers when they married consorts of the Jiang family, this former aristocratic family that had been losing its prominence in the last years of the Shang dynasty, and was restored to power after the founding of the Zhou dynasty.

Yi Jiang is acknowledged to have had influence over the affairs of state. Her spouse the king appointed her as one of his nine government ministers, an appointment which is confirmed in records.

== Issue ==
- Prince Song (王子誦; 1060–1020 BC), ruled as King Cheng of Zhou from 1042 to 1021 BC
- Third son, Prince Yu (王子虞), ruled as the Marquis of Tang from 1042 BC
