= Deer Terrace Pavilion =

Excessive Xia or Shang dynasty palace

The Deer Terrace Pavilion (traditional Chinese: 鹿臺; simplified Chinese: 鹿台; pinyin: Lùtái) was a structure believed to have been built during the Xia and/or Shang dynasties. Its location was believed to be in Zhaoge (near the present-day Jinniuling mountain ridge in Qi County, Hebi).

== History ==
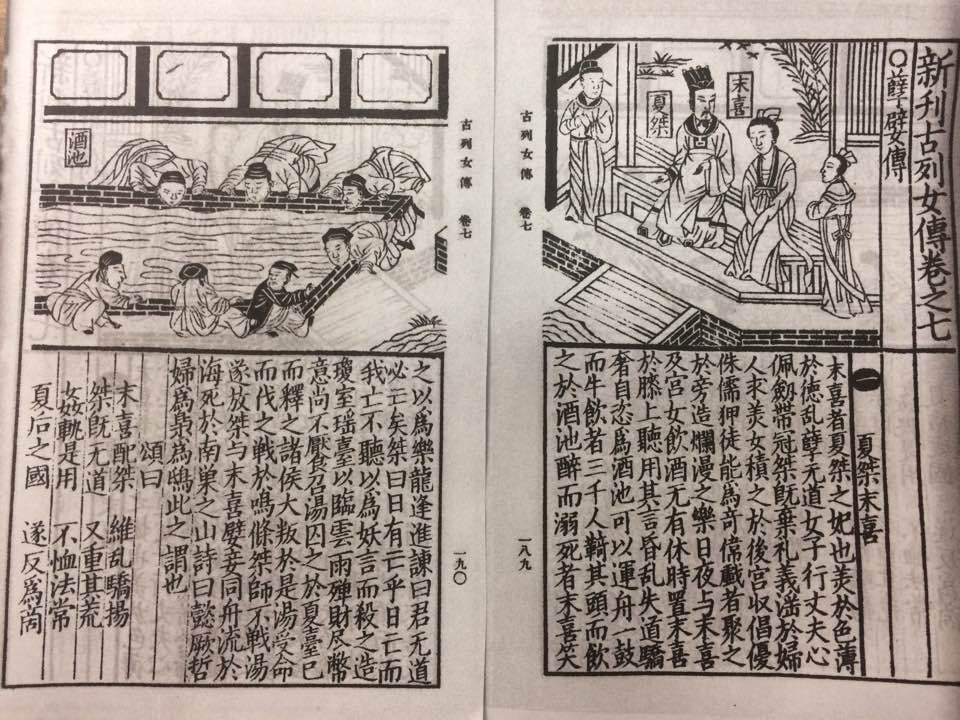
19th Century illustration of Jie of Xia watching men drink from the Lake of Wine with Mo Xi, edited by Ruan Fu (阮福).

According to the Chinese classics, particularly Shuo Yuan, the Deer Terrace Pavilion was the site of a luxurious pool, nicknamed the "Lake of Wine and Forest of Meat" (Chinese: 酒池肉林; pinyin: Jiǔchí Ròulín; lit. 'pond of wine', 'forest of meat'). Meat would be hung alongside the pool, which would be filled with wine for the personal pleasure of Di Xin. The phrase 酒池肉林 (Jiǔchí Ròulín) is now a Chinese idiom for excessive extravagance and debauchery.

The story of the "Lake of Wine and Forest of Meat" is a disputed one; Eastern Han scholar Wang Chong questioned the feasibility of the matter, and Southern Song scholar Luo Mi noted that the story is associated not just with Di Xin, but Jie of Xia as well, implying overlapping narratives.

Around 20 January 1046 BC, King Wu of Predynastic Zhou launched a violent attack on the Shang capital, Zhaoge, as part of the Battle of Muye. Zhou quickly defeated Shang, and the last king of Shang, Di Xin, retreated to the pavilion and set it on fire, burning it and himself along with his jewels as the result of the defeat. The remaining wealth inside was then redistributed by Nangong Kuo by the order of King Wu. This event marked the end of the Shang dynasty and the beginning of the Zhou dynasty. The charred remains of the pavilion have yet to be identified.

== Archaeology ==
In 1999, a pool purported to be the Deer Terrace Pavilion was uncovered in an archaeological survey in Yanshi and was found to be 130 metres (430 ft) long, 20 metres (66 ft) wide, and 1.5 metres (4.9 ft) deep. Contemporary water wells were also found close to the pool, leading archaeologists to conclude that its primary function was not to supply groundwater to the pavilion.
