= Zhongjue =

Zhongjue -- (Chinese: 中潏; pinyin: Zhòngjué; lit. 'Jue the Younger'), formerly romanized as Chung Chüeh -- was a figure in the legendary prehistory of China.

In the Records of the Grand Historian, Sima Qian's account of the origins of the House of Ying made Zhongjue the great-great-grandson of Zhongyan and the grandfather of Elai Ge. In the same account, Sima records a speech from one of the marquesses of Shen that attested to Zhongjue having been born to Xuxuan "of the Rong" and a lady of Shen from Mount Li and that it was account of this marriage that the Rong were peaceful and Zhongjue served as a vassal of the Zhou kings. Zhongjue himself was said to live among the Rong and to guard the Zhou's "Western March", a territory in modern Gansu controlling the access from the Xihan, a northern Yangtze tributary, to the Zhou heartland along the Wei.
