= Zhongyan =

Zhongyan (Chinese: 仲衍; pinyin: Zhōngyǎn; lit. 'Yan the Younger') was a figure in Shang dynasty of China.

In the Records of the Grand Historian, Sima Qian's account of the origins of the House of Ying state that he was the great-great-grandson of Lian the Great, son of Fei the Great (also known as Boyi). In turn, he was said to be the great-great-grandfather of Zhongjue. Elai Ge was one of his descendants, who would go on to serve in the Battle of Muye .
