= Battle of Muye =

Mid-10th Century BCE conquest of the Shang by Predynastic Zhou

Battle of Muye 牧野之戰
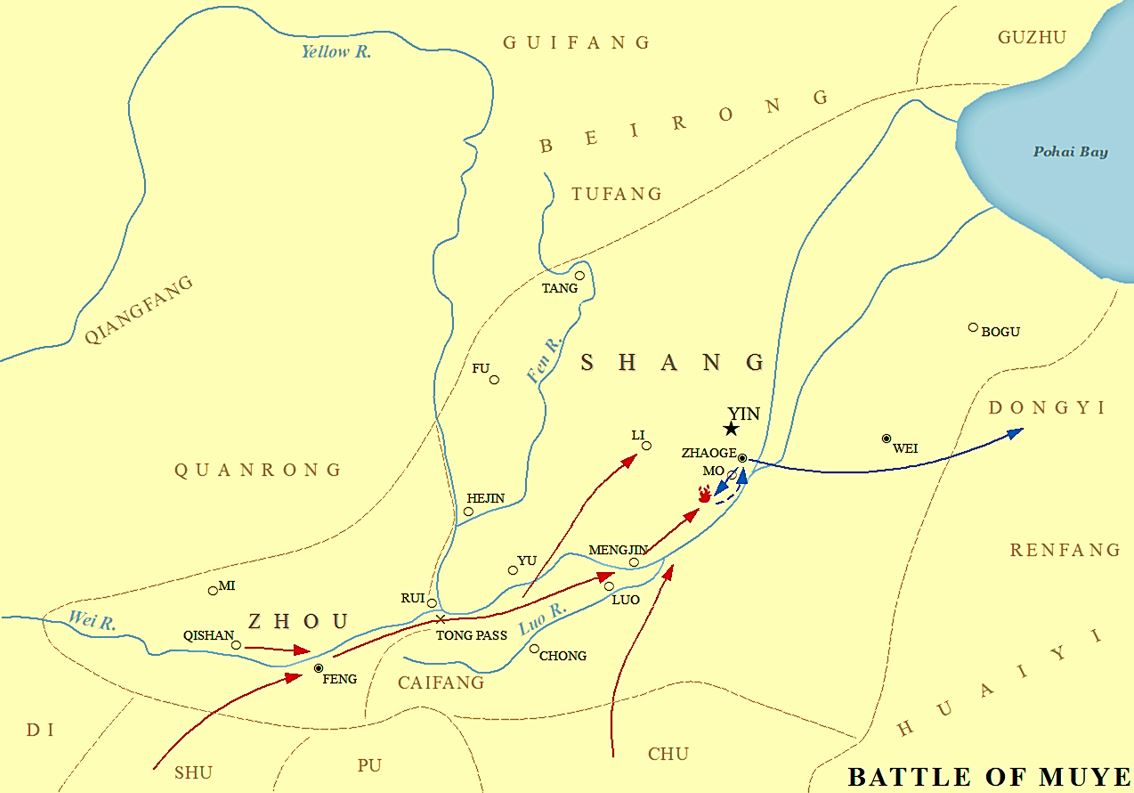
Date	c. 1046 BC (Note: 1046 BC is the year endorsed by the Xia–Shang–Zhou Chronology Project, though doubts persist on this dating. See § Dating.)
Location	Muye (in present-day central Henan)
Result	Zhou victory; Collapse of the Shang dynasty; Rise of the Zhou dynasty; Death of Di Xin; Burning of the Deer Terrace Pavilion

Belligerents
Shang	Zhou; Yong (庸); Shu (蜀); Qiang (羌); Mao (髳); Wei (微); Lu (盧); Peng (彭); Pu (濮) (Note: The given date in this chapter of the Book of Documents matches that of the Li gui.)

Commanders and leaders
Di Xin †; Elai Ge †; Fei Zhong † (Note: While this Shuo Yuan citation notes Marquess Hu of Chong dying during the Battle of Muye, alternate sources, including Shuo Yuan itself in another anecdote, says Marquess Hu died before the battle.); Changbi Jue'er (長鼻決耳); Feilian (POW)	King Wu of Zhou; Jiang Ziya; San Yisheng; Hong Yao; Nangong Kuo; Tai Dian (Note: Some sources state that Tai Dian is the same person as Jiang Ziya, but this is disputed)

Strength
170,000 troops Historically, the Shang Dynasty is recorded as deploying 700,000 troops (disputed).	45,000 footmen; 3,000 elites; 300 chariots; 3,700 allied chariots; (Each chariot / 25 men)

Casualties and losses
Heavy	

Battle of Muye
- Traditional Chinese: 牧野之戰
- Hanyu Pinyin: Mùyě zhī zhàn
Transcriptions
Standard Mandarin
- Hanyu Pinyin: Mùyě zhī zhàn
- Wade–Giles: Mu-yeh chih chan

The Battle of Muye, Mu, or Muh (c. 1046 BC) (Note: literally, "Battle of the Wild Pasture") was fought between forces of the ancient Chinese Shang dynasty led by Di Xin and the rebel state of Zhou led by King Wu. The Zhou defeated the Shang at Muye and captured the Shang capital Yin, marking the end of the Shang and the establishment of the Zhou dynasty—an event that features prominently in Chinese historiography as an example of the Mandate of Heaven theory that functioned to justify dynastic conquest throughout Chinese history.

== Background ==
The background to the Battle of Muye is murky, as much of the history is written from the perspectives of the prevailing Western Zhou dynasty and subsequent rulers. As centuries went on, narratives about the battle, particularly around the attitudes towards Di Xin, became progressively more vitriolic, and would embellish the details. Therefore, a neutral account is difficult to produce.

By the 12th century BC, Shang influence extended west to the Wei River valley, a region that was occupied by clans known as the Predynastic Zhou. King Wen of Zhou, the ruler of the Zhou and vassal of the Shang king, was given the title "Overlord of the West" by Di Xin, then-ruler of Shang. (Note: The Shang monarch's name is recorded as "Di Xin" (帝辛, "God-King Xin") in Shang records. Zhou records call him by many names, using his posthumous pejorative epithet "Zhou" (紂). These include "Zhouxin", "Zhou of Shang", "Zhou of Yin" (his capital city), and "Shang King Zhou". This name "Zhòu" is an entirely different word to the Zhōu dynasty that conquered him (周), despite their identical romanization when tone marks are ignored.) As an ally state, King Wen and the Predynastic Zhou would guard Shang's rear while Di Xin was involved in campaigns to the east, particularly against the Renfang 人方, Linfang 林方, and Hufang 虎方. These wars were costly to the Shang and drained their resources. King Wen's performance as "Overlord of the West" was admirable, and so he was made one of Di Xin's "Three Dukes," along with Marquesses Jiu and E.

At some point, Di Xin allegedly killed the daughter of Marquess Jiu who had been gifted to him, and then minced the Marquess himself, and then the Marquess of E. King Wen of Zhou learned of this and let out a sigh. Marquess Hu of Chong told Di Xin of the sigh, which led to King Wen's imprisonment. Although Wen was later released, the tension between Shang and Zhou grew. Wen prepared his army and conquered a few smaller states which were loyal to Shang, slowly weakening Shang allies, including the sacking of the State of Chong and founding Chengyi (程邑) and a new capital in Fengjing in its territories. However, King Wen died in 1050 BC before Zhou's actual offensive against Shang could begin, leaving King Wu of Zhou to continue his legacy. Despite reports of the conquests in the Wei River valley and depleting power, Di Xin was unconcerned about Zhou's progress, as he allegedly believed his rule was secured by the Mandate of Heaven.

King Wen's son King Wu of Zhou led the Zhou in a revolt a few years after King Wen's death. The reason for this delay was that King Wu believed that the heavenly order to conquer Shang had not been given as he approached the Mengjin ford, as well as the advice of Jiang Ziya to wait for the right opportunity. There was also an account of two boys, Boyi and Shuqi, who would go on a hunger strike in protest of the battle until their deaths.

=== Sentiment towards Di Xin ===
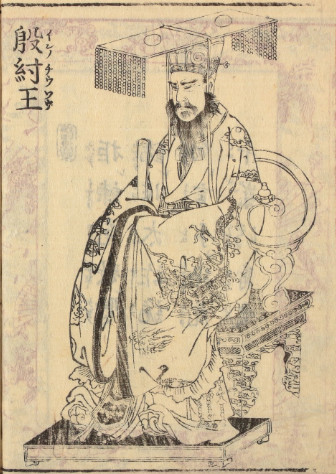
19th Century depiction of Di Xin in Ehon Sangoku Yōfuden.

Contemporary sentiment towards Di Xin is difficult to gauge, but was seen as a significant contributing factor to the Zhou conquest of Shang for a significant length of time. Subsequent histories were politically and culturally aligned with the conquering Zhou, and historical accounts of Di Xin grew more egregious over time. In earlier sources, he is depicted as benighted and ineffectual; whereas after a few centuries, he is described as a monstrous torturer, universally despised. For example, in Records of the Grand Historian, he is described as overindulging in alcohol and sex with his consort Daji, torturing dissidents, and abandoning feng (豊), the Shang conception of ancestor veneration.

However, these charges made by the Zhou are not reflected in contemporary evidence, and later scholars, such as Wang Chong and Luo Mi, dispute these claims. Daji, the villainous consort alleged to have convinced Di Xin to conduct his wicked deeds, is not seen in oracle bone evidence. The oracle bone evidence from Di Xin's period that is extant demonstrates sacrifices made towards Di Yi and other ancestors, and the rewarding of citizens for participating in ritual like any other ruler. However, it is noted that ritual practice under Di Xin had become more centralised, which could be a source of tension. Therefore, whether the rebellion against the Shang was due to Di Xin's attitude is unclear at best.

== Battle ==
With just 45,000 men and a few hundred wagons, the Zhou were initially hugely outnumbered – even though most of the Shang forces were at war to the east, Di Xin organized some 170,000 troops. However, many of Di Xin's fighters were allegedly slaves, and he thought that despite low troop morale, his army's superior numbers could, if not defeat, then at least slow down the rebels until reinforcements could arrive. He was wrong. The majority of his Shang troops fled or joined the Zhou, and the few who did not were easily overwhelmed by the Zhou forces.

Still, many loyal Shang troops fought on, and a very bloody battle followed, depicted at the end of a poem in the Shijing:

The troops of Yin-Shang,
Were collected like a forest,
And marshaled in the wilderness of Muh (Muye).
...
The wilderness of Muh spread out extensively;
Bright shone the chariots of sandal;
The teams of bays, black-maned and white-bellied, galloped along;
The grand-master Shang-foo,
Was like an eagle on the wing,
Assisting king Woo,
Who at one onset smote the great Shang.

— James Legge (translation), in Da ming (大明, "Great brightness", poem #236), Shijing (Note: The final words of this poem, "會朝清明", do not have an agreed-upon meaning, even accounting for poetic variation. Legge (1871) has "That morning's encounter was followed by a clear bright [day]." Shaughnessy (1999) and Chen (2021) give "Meeting in the morning, clear and bright." Nivison (2018) reads the final two words as a date term, yielding "this occurred in the morning, Qingming [Day]".)

The Zhou troops were much better trained, and their morale was high. In one of the chariot charges, King Wu broke through the Shang's defense line. Di Xin was forced to flee to his palace, and the remaining Shang troops fell into further chaos. The Zhou were victorious and showed little mercy to the defeated Shang, shedding enough blood "to float a log".

The Yi Zhou Shu, which has had fragments excavated in the past century, portrays the conquest of Shang in a noticeably more brutal light than other narratives, noting that King Wu took prisoners and massacred civilians as he entered Yin, and killed Di Xin with an axe. It was condemned by scholars such as Mencius for a significant length of time. The prose is noticeably corrupted, with the Book of Han occasionally quoting it with different prose. Regardless, it has seen recent attention in scholarship given its relatively stable narrative compared to many received texts.

== Aftermath ==
The traditional narrative of the aftermath of the battle tells of Di Xin gathering his treasures, ascending to the Deer Terrace Pavilion, and burning it with himself inside, committing suicide. King Wu killed Daji after he found her on the order of Jiang Ziya, wherein her head, along with Di Xin's, was placed on a pike. King Wu then paid respects to Bi Gan, who had allegedly been killed by Di Xin before the war, then freed Jizi and honored the neighborhood of Shang Rong with a plaque. Shang officials were released without charge with some later working as Zhou officials. The imperial grain store was opened immediately after the battle to feed the starving population, and wealth from Deer Terrace Pavilion was redistributed. The battle marked the end of the Shang dynasty and the beginning of the Zhou dynasty.

After the conquest, oracle bone evidence shows King Wu requesting Wu Geng's presence, and classical texts tell of him being allowed to continue the Shang state religion within Yin for a time, before Weizi Qi was enfeoffed with the state of Song. King Wu would enfeoff three relatives; Shu Xian of Guan, Shu Du of Cai, and Shu Chu of Huo, who would become the "Three Guards," who would cut off Shang from access to support from the Dongyi and no longer harm rival tribes. However, upon King Wu's death, Wu Geng would cooperate with the three brothers to mount the Rebellion of the Three Guards against the Duke of Zhou, who took regency during the reign of King Cheng of Zhou, fearing him as a usurper and believing Wu Geng should be the regent instead.

After the war and subsequent rebellion, King Cheng of Zhou would engage in the forced displacement of the Shang people, relocating them for several years from Yin to places like Wey, Luoyi, and finally, Lu.

== Dating ==
Although the day and month on which the Battle of Muye was fought are certain, there is doubt about the year. Prior to the Xia–Shang–Zhou Chronology Project, previous chronologies had proposed at least 44 different dates for this event, ranging from 1130 to 1018 BC. The most popular had been 1122 BC, calculated by the Han dynasty astronomer Liu Xin, and 1027 BC, deduced from a statement in the "old text" Bamboo Annals that the Western Zhou (whose endpoint is known to be 770 BC) had lasted 257 years.

A few documents relate astronomical observations to this event:

- A quotation in the Book of Han from the lost Wǔchéng 武成 chapter of the Book of Documents appears to describe a lunar eclipse just before the beginning of King Wu's campaign. This date, and the date of his victory, are given as months and sexagenary days.
- A passage in the Guoyu gives the positions of the Sun, Moon, Jupiter, and two stars on the day King Wu attacked the Shang.
- The "current text" Bamboo Annals mentions conjunctions of all five planets occurring before and after the Zhou conquest. Han-period texts mention the first conjunction as occurring in the 32nd year of the reign of the last king. Such events are rare, but all five planets did gather on 28 May 1059 BC and again on 26 September 1019 BC. Although the recorded positions in the sky of these two events are the reverse of what occurred, they could not have been retrospectively calculated at the time the account first appears.

The strategy adopted by the Project was to use the archaeological investigation to narrow the range of dates that would need to be compared with the astronomical data. Although no archaeological traces of King Wu's campaign have been found, the pre-conquest Zhou capital at Fengxi in Shaanxi has been excavated and strata at the site have been identified with the pre-dynastic Zhou. Radiocarbon dating of samples from the site as well as at late Yinxu and early Zhou capitals, using the wiggle matching technique, yielded a date for the conquest between 1050 and 1020 BC. The only date within that range matching all the astronomical data is 20 January 1046 BC. This date had previously been proposed by David Pankenier, who had matched the above passages from the classics with the same astronomical events, but here it resulted from a thorough consideration of a broader range of evidence.

Other scholars have raised several criticisms of this process. The connection between the layers at the archaeological sites and the conquest is uncertain. The narrow range of radiocarbon dates is cited with a less stringent confidence interval (68%) than the standard requirement of 95%, which would have produced a much wider range. The texts describing the relevant astronomical phenomena are extremely obscure. For example, the inscription on the Li gui, a key text used in dating the conquest, can be interpreted in several different ways, with one alternative reading leading to the date of 9 January 1044 BC.

== Archaeology ==
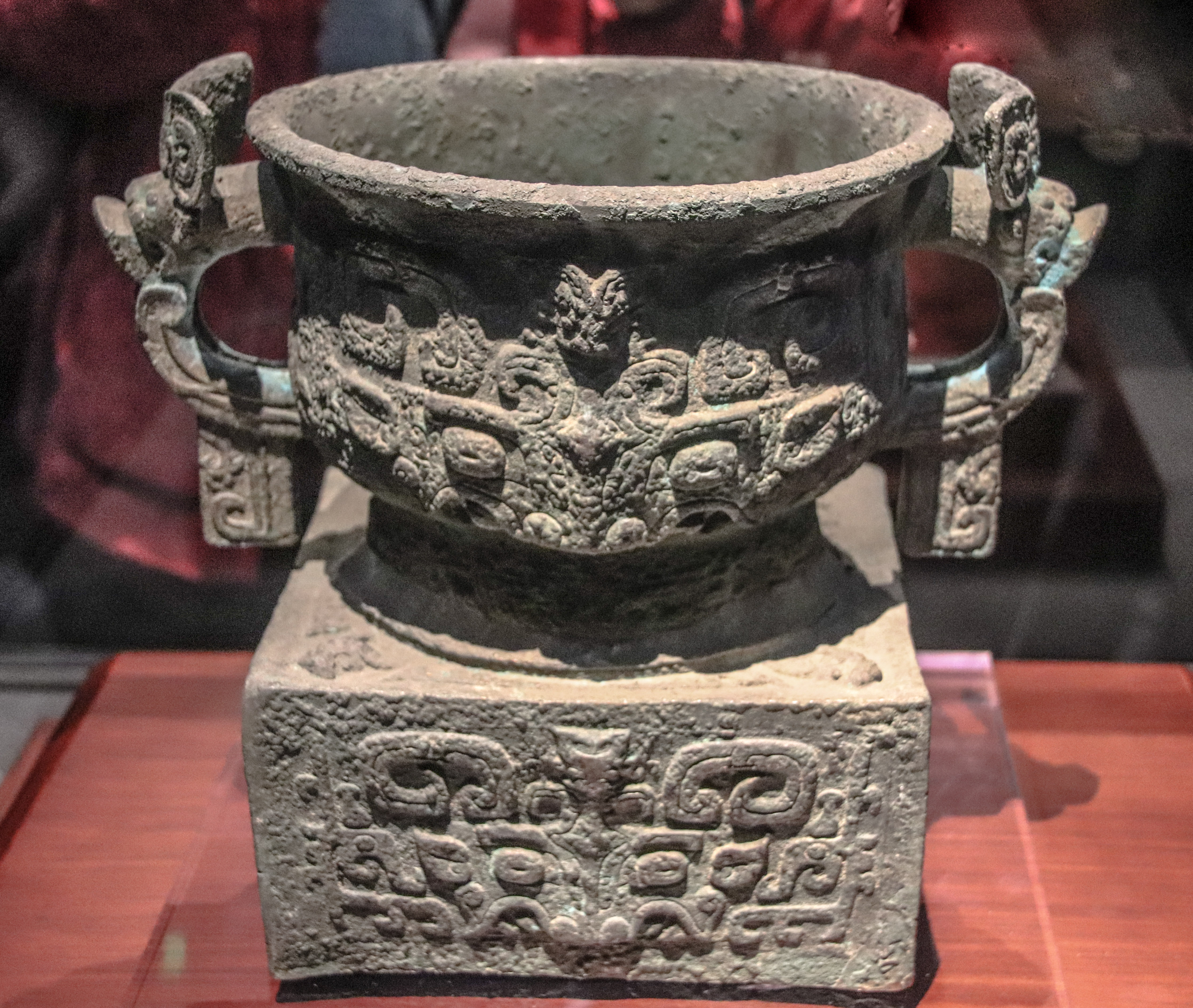
The Li gui, a crucial artifact for dating the Battle of Muye.

Archaeology has revealed that Yin had no border walls, unlike other, older Shang strongholds such as Huanbei. This is likely because of the Huan River flowing nearby, creating a natural moat defense against attack, and the lack of walls would lend to chariot-based offensives.

Despite the findings at Yin and the historicity of a "final battle" being clear, the location of "Muye" at the time of the offensive is unclear, and the remains of the battle have failed to materialise in excavations. Zhaoge has also not been found, and could simply be another area of Yin. Sun Yingmin (孙英民), President of the Henan Provincial Society of Cultural Relics and Archaeology, believes that the Mengzhuang archaeological site could be the site of the Battle of Muye. This is for three reasons: It is close in proximity to the ruins of Yin, appears to have maintained a long-standing culture, and has some remains reminiscent of the Erligang culture, associated with the Late Shang culture. However, this hypothesis has not been fully explored.

== See also ==
- Battle of Mingtiao
