= Yi Zhou Shu =

Chinese historical text

A page from a printed copy of the Yi Zhou Shu

The Yi Zhou Shu (traditional Chinese: 逸周書; simplified Chinese: 逸周书; Wade–Giles: I Chou shu; lit. 'Lost Book of Zhou') is a compendium of Chinese historical documents about the Western Zhou period (1046–771 BCE). Its textual history began with a (4th century BCE) text/compendium known as the Zhou Shu ("Book of Zhou"), which was possibly not differentiated from the corpus of the same name in the extant Book of Documents. Western Han dynasty (202 BCE–CE 9) editors listed 70 chapters of the Yi Zhou Shu, of which 59 are extant as texts, and the rest only as chapter titles. Such condition is described for the first time by Wang Shihan (王士漢) in 1669. Circulation ways of the individual chapters before that point (merging of different texts or single text's editions, substitution, addition, conflation with commentaries etc.) are subject to scholarly debates.

Traditional Chinese historiography classified the Yi Zhou Shu as a zashi (雜史) or "unofficial history" and excluded it from the canonical dynastic Twenty-Four Histories.

== Titles ==
This early Chinese historical text has four titles: Zhou zhi, Zhou shu "Documents/Book of Zhou", Yi Zhoushu "Lost/Leftover Documents/Book of Zhou", and Jizhong Zhou shu "Ji Tomb Documents/Book of Zhou".

Zhou zhi 周志 appears once throughout the transmitted texts: in the Zuo zhuan (Duke Wen of Lu's 2nd year – 625 BCE), along the quote presently found in the Yi Zhou Shu. The reference is valuable since it differentiates the Yi Zhou Shu from the corpus of other documents called shu and possibly refers to its educational function.

Zhoushu (or Zhou shu) – combining Zhou 周 "Zhou dynasty" and shu 書 "writing; document; book; letter" – is the earliest record of the present title. Depending upon the semantic interpretation of shu, Zhoushu can be translated "Book(s) of Zhou" (cf. Hanshu 漢書 Book of Han) or "Documents of Zhou" (cf. Shujing 書經 Book of Documents). In Modern Standard Chinese usage, Zhoushu is the title of the Book of Zhou history about the later Northern Zhou dynasty (557–581).

Yizhoushu (or Yi Zhou shu) adds yi 逸 "escape; flee; neglect; missing; lost; remain" to the title, which scholars interpret in two ways. Either "Lost Book(s) of Zhou", with a literal translation of yi as "lost" (cf. yishu 逸書 "lost books; ancient works no longer in existence"). Or "Remaining Book(s) of Zhou", with a reading of yi as "remnant; leftover" (cf. yijing 逸經 "classical texts not included in the orthodox classics"). This dubious tradition began with Liu Xiang (79–8 BCE) describing the text as: "The solemn statements and orders of the Zhou period; they are in fact the residue of the hundred pian [chapters] discussed by Confucius." McNeal translates differently, "[The Yi Zhou shu] may well be what remained after Confucius edited the hundred chapters [of the Shang shu]". Since the canonical Shang shu in circulation had 29 chapters, McNeal proposes,

Perhaps sometime during the early Western Han the transmitted version of the Zhou shu was expanded so as to produce a text of exactly seventy-one chapters, so that, added to the twenty-nine chapters of the Shang shu, the so-called "hundred chapters of the shu" could be given a literal meaning. This would account for those chapters of the Yi Zhou shu that seem entirely unrelated or only tentatively related to the main themes of the work.

Jizhong Zhoushu (or Jizhong Zhou shu, 汲冢周書) derives from a second tradition that the text was found among the manuscripts on bamboo slips unearthed in the (c. 279 CE) Jizhong discovery of the tomb of King Xiang of Wei (衛襄王, r. 311–296 BCE). Shaughnessy concludes that since "both of these traditions can be shown to be without foundation", and since all the earliest textual citations refer to it as Zhoushu, there is now a "general scholarly consensus" that the title should in fact read simply as Zhou shu. However, since Zhou shu also figures as the section of the Book of Documents, the name "Yizhoushu" has obtained broad currency as safely marking the differentiation.

English translations of the Yi Zhou shu title include:

- "Leftover Zhou Writings"
- "Remainder of Zhou documents"
- "[Remaining] Zhou documents"
- "Chou Documents Apocrypha"
- "Remainder of the Zhou Documents"
- "Remnants of Zhou Documents"
- "The Superfluous [Chapters of the] Book of Zhou"

== Content ==
In the 1st century BCE, the Zhoushu or Yizhoushu text consisted of 10 fascicles (juan 巻 "scroll; volume; book; fascicle") with 70 chapters (pian 篇 "article; section; chapter") and a preface. Eleven chapters were lost around the 12th century CE, and only the titles survive. The extant text has 59 chapters and a preface, with a commentary for 42 chapters attributed to the Jin dynasty scholar Kong Zhao (孔晁, fl. 256–266).

Based upon linguistic and thematic consistencies, modern scholarship reveals that 32 chapters constitute a textual "core" treating governmental and military topics. The remaining 27 Yizhoushu chapters are heterogeneous. Some describe historical events ranging from King Wen of Zhou (r. 1099–1050 BCE) down to King Jing of Zhou (Gui) (r. 544–520 BCE); supplementary chapters record topics such as astronomy (52 Shixun 時訓) and posthumous names (54 Shifa 謚法).

McNeal disagrees with Shaughnessy's claim that "there is no discernible organization of the text," and contends, "there is in fact a chronological presentation of material throughout the progression of most of the chapters." For instance, 18 chapter titles use one of the paired words wen 文 "civil; literary" and wu 武 "military; martial" – a literary reference to the Zhou founders King Wen and King Wu. At least 28 of the 59 extant chapters "are unambiguously set in the pre-dynastic reigns of Kings Wen and Wu or during the immediate time of the conquest of Shang."

== Date and place of composition ==
According to Shaughnessy, the Yizhoushu underwent two textual redactions.

First, sometime in the late 4th or early 3rd century BCE, an anonymous editor compiled the 32 "core" chapters. These have linguistic and intellectual features characteristic of Warring States writings, and were quoted in classics such as the Zuozhuan, Hanfeizi, and Zhanguoce.

Second, no later than the early 1st century BCE, another editor, possibly the preface's author, composed a redaction with 70 chapters and a preface (modeled upon the Old Texts preface to the Shangshu). Some secondary chapters are earlier than the core and others are later. For instance, Chapter 32 Wushun 武順 uses the term di 帝 "emperor"; McNeal interprets it as "a late third-century BC date", when di came to mean "Emperor of China". Qing historian Zhu Youceng (朱右曾, 19th century) claimed that, though possibly not produced in the early Zhou, Yizhoushu had no features of the Warring States or Qin–Han forgery.

The philosophical lineage of the Yizhoushu within the Hundred Schools of Thought remains uncertain. According to McNeal, several schools (including one branch of Confucianism) emphasized the concept of wen and wu as "the civil and martial spheres of government as comprising a comprehensive totality." In particular, the concept was highlighted by the famous ancient military strategist and politician Jiang Ziya or Tai Gong 太公, who is known through the writings of Su Qin (380–284 BCE) from the School of Diplomacy or "School of Vertical and Horizontal [Alliances]".

According to Chinese scholars, possible transmission line of the earliest Yizhoushu chapters went through the state of Jin (晉) and its subsequently divided territories. It is attested by the preserved textual quotes, most of which are ascribed to Jin personae. A number of thematic parallels are found between Yizhoushu and the Wenzi, which is reported to be also produced in Jin.

== Textual history ==
The bibliography sections (yiwenzhi 藝文志) of the Twenty-Four Histories provide valuable diachronic data. The (111 CE) Book of Han imperial Bibliography records the Zhoushu, or Zhoushiji 周史記, in 71 chapters. The (636) Book of Sui lists a Zhoushu in ten fascicles (juan), and notes it derived from the Jizhong discovery of Jin dynasty period. Yan Shigu (581–645), annotating Yiwenzhi, states that of the 71 Yizhoushu chapters only 45 are extant. However, Liu Zhiji (661–721) claims that all 71 original chapters were extant. The Old Book of Tang (945) bibliography lists an 8-fascicle Zhoushu with annotations by Kong Zhao (孔晁, mid-3rd century). The New Book of Tang (1060) lists both a Jizhong Zhoushu in ten fascicles and Kong Zhao's annotated Zhoushu in eight. The (1345) History of Song and subsequent dynastic histories only list the Jizhong Zhoushu in ten fascicles. Shaughnessy concludes that two separate versions existed up until the Tang period, the eight-fascicle Kong Zhao zhu Zhoushu (孔晁注周書) and the ten-fascicle Jizhong Zhoushu (汲冢周書). These two textual versions were assimilated during the Northern Song period (960–1279), and the loss of eleven chapters occurred before the middle Southern Song (1127–1279).

Both these traditions, associating the extant Yizhoushu to Jizhong texts or Kong's edition, have dubious historicity. First, contemporary research on the Yizhoushu has conclusively demonstrated that the received text could not have been recovered from King Xiang's tomb along with the Bamboo Annals. Shaughnessy explains that "the Yi Zhou shu was extant as an integral text, known as the Zhou shu 周書, throughout the nearly six centuries from King Xiang's burial in 296 B.C. through the opening of the tomb in 280 A.D." Some chapters (e.g., 62 Shifang 職方) have internal evidence of being written after the 221 BCE Qin dynasty unification. Second, it is unlikely that Kong Zhao, author of the earliest commentary, consulted the Jizhong documents. The dates of Kong's life are uncertain, but he was a close contemporary of Wang Su (195–256), and the last historical reference to him was in an imperial invitation of 266. Shaughnessy says Kong's commentary was added to the text "sometime in the middle of the third century A.D., but certainly before the 280 opening of King Xiang's tomb." Histories listed many scholars – but not Kong Zhao – who worked on deciphering the bamboo strips.

Yizhoushu commentaries began with Kong Zhao in the 3rd century and continue in the present day. Kong's commentary is extant for 42 of the 59 chapters, and has been included in most editions. Qing dynasty (1644–1912) scholarship produced valuable Yizhoushu commentaries and editions. The text-critical edition of Lu Wenchao (盧文弨, 1717–1796) was based on eight Yuan dynasty and Ming dynasty versions, and includes twelve earlier Qing commentaries. The (1936) Sibu beiyao 四部備要 series reprinted Lu's edition, which is called the 抱經堂本 "Baojing Study version". The (1919) Sibu congkan 四部叢刊 collection reproduced the earliest edition, a (1543) version by Zhang Bo (章檗) printed at the Jiaxing provincial academy.

Compared with most other Chinese classics, the Yizhoushu has been neglected by scholars, both Chinese and Western. McNeal suggests, "A bias against the work, perhaps originating in part from the misconception that it comprised those Zhou documents that Confucius deemed unfit for inclusion in his canonical edition of the Shang shu 尚書, or Venerated Documents (which includes a section called "Zhou Documents" itself), has contributed to the relative neglect of this text."

== Parallel texts and epigraphics ==
The text close to the known version of Yizhoushu was known to Sima Qian: numerous parallels are found in the Shi ji account on Zhou history, and the Yizhoushu "Ke Yin" (#36) and "Duoyi" (#44) chapters are basically incorporated into the Shi ji in their full form. The observation was made by Ding Fu (丁黼).

Among the excavated sources on Yizhoushu:

- Bamboo cache of Cili County, Zhangjiajie, Hunan (excavated in 1987) contains fairly complete text of Yi Zhou Shu #8 "Da Wu" (大武).
- Fragments of Yi Zhou Shu were identified in the Tsinghua Bamboo Slips (2008).

== Traditional scholarly attitudes ==
The Shi fu (世浮) document was condemned by Mencius and ignored by Sima Qian, which is probably part of the reason it is found in the Yizhoushu today instead of the Book of Documents. After its compilation, the Yizhoushu was condemned as inadequate representation of history by the traditional Confucian scholars of the late imperial period, beginning from the Song dynasty (Ding Fu, Hong Mai). Their standpoints were characterized by merging of moralistic judgement into textual criticism. Most pronounced condemnation came from Fang Xiaoru (1357–1402). Fang claimed that Yi Zhou Shu contained "exaggerations" and "immoral" notions ascribed to the past sages (bringing "Shi fu" chapter as an example for the first, and "Guan ren", "Da wu", "Da ming" for the second). He concluded on those grounds that they could not have been authentic Zhou documents, and thus Liu Xiang's claim that they had been left over by Confucius was necessarily false.

Yegor Grebnev has recently shown that the "Shi fu" chapter is a compilation of a number of pre-existing texts. The organization of the chapter, the totals of captives and animals, etc., are best understood in this light, and as demonstrating an ideal of kingship far removed from the moralistic "Mandate of Heaven" ideological construction of the Zhou conquest: hence Mencius's rejection of what is probably a more authentic account.
