= King Wu of Zhou =

First King of the Zhou dynasty (r. 1046–1043 BCE)

King Wu of Zhou 周武王
- Portrait of King Wu by Ma Lin

Ruler of Predynastic Zhou
- Reign: 1050–1046 BCE
- Predecessor: King Wen of Zhou

King of the Zhou dynasty
- Reign: 1046–1043 BCE
- Predecessor: Di Xin (Shang dynasty)
- Successor: King Cheng of Zhou
- Born: Ji Fa (姬發) c. 1097 BCE; Predynastic Zhou
- Died: 1043 BCE (age 54); Haojing, Western Zhou
- Wife: Yi Jiang
- Issue: King Cheng of Zhou; Yu
Names
- Family name: Ji (姬); Given name: Fa (發); Clan name: Zhou (周); Contracted name: Wu (珷)
Posthumous name
- King Wu (周武王, lit. "Martial King of Zhou")
- Dynasty: Zhou dynasty
- Father: King Wen of Zhou
- Mother: Tai Si

Chinese name
- Chinese: 周武王
- Literal meaning: Martial King of Zhou
Transcriptions
Standard Mandarin
- Hanyu Pinyin: Zhōu Wǔ wáng
- Wade–Giles: Chou^{1} Wu^{3} wang^{2}
- IPA: [ʈʂóʊ ù wǎŋ]
Yue: Cantonese
- Yale Romanization: Jāu Móuh wòhng
- Jyutping: Zau1 Mou5 wong4
Southern Min
- Hokkien POJ: Chiu Bú ông
Old Chinese
- Baxter–Sagart (2014): *Tiw M(r)aʔ ɢʷang

Personal name
- Traditional Chinese: 姬發
- Simplified Chinese: 姬发
Transcriptions
Standard Mandarin
- Hanyu Pinyin: Jī Fā
- Wade–Giles: Chi^{1} Fa^{1}
- IPA: [tɕí fá]
Old Chinese
- Baxter–Sagart (2014): *[k](r)ə Cə.pat

King Wu of Zhou (died c. 1043 BC), personal name Ji Fa, was the founding king of the Zhou dynasty of China. He is considered one of the inaugurators of the Chinese dynastic cycle and a model ruler in the Confucian tradition.

King Wu's rule of the Predynastic Zhou began around 1050 BC, when he succeeded his father King Wen. Working with Jiang Ziya, he set out to complete his father's unfinished task of overthrowing the tyrannical Di Xin and his Shang dynasty. In 1046 BC, leading a coalition that included eight other states, King Wu routed Di Xin's army at the Battle of Muye and captured the Shang capital Yin, marking the end of the Shang and the rise of the Zhou.

As King of China, King Wu consolidated his rule by granting territory to his relatives and allies. He is regarded as a virtuous ruler by later Confucians, and his overthrow of the Shang features prominently in Chinese historiography as an example of the Mandate of Heaven.

== Name ==
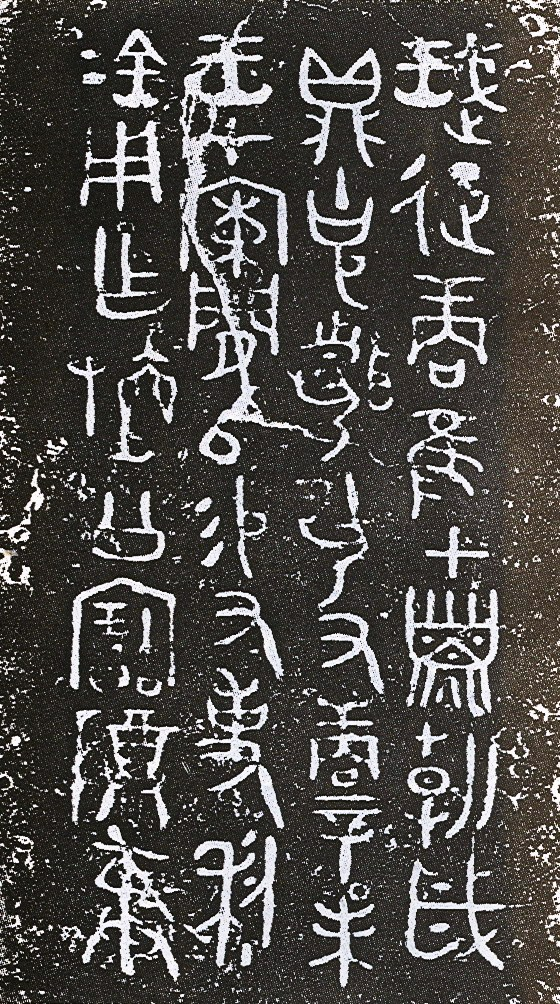
Li gui showing 珷, top-right.

In bronze inscriptions, such as the Li gui, King Wu's name is occasionally contracted to wǔ 珷. It is generally considered to be a ligature, though it is subject to scholarly debate, with some arguing that it could be seen as a specialised variant of wu 武. The Yinggong ding (应公鼎) records his name as "Wǔ Dì Rì Dīng" (珷帝日丁) "King Wu, the Thearch of the Ding Day."

The Li gui inscription goes as follows:

珷征商隹甲子朝
King Wu's campaign against Shang, on the morning of the jiazi day.

King Wu's personal name was Ji Fa 姬發.

== Lineage ==
King Wu was the second son of the Predynastic Zhou elder Ji Chang (posthumously titled King Wen of Zhou) and Tai Si. His older brother was Bo Yikao, who was passed over. This is reflected in the Book of Rites. King Wu's grandfather Ji Li, King of Zhou had likewise inherited Zhou despite having two older brothers. Modern scholarship, based on the Book of Rites, posits that the reason for older brothers being passed over was because of an ancient tradition that placed younger brothers as heirs, which explains the reigns of King Tai of Zhou, King Ji, and King Wu all being enthroned despite being the youngest brother.

In later accounts of Bo Yikao being passed over, it is said that Di Xin had killed him by lingchi. Among the earliest accounts of this lie in Records of Emperors and Kings (帝王世紀) of the 9th Century, which was then transmitted and quoted through later texts, such as the historical fiction Fengshen Yanyi. Given this punishment and anecdote only appear in accounts several centuries ahead of Di Xin's time, the historicity of this account is vanishingly unlikely.

== Reign ==
The chronology of King Wu's overall reign is disputed. However, his reign as the ruler of Predynastic Zhou is thought to have begun in 1050 BC, and his reign as King of China is thought to have begun around 1046 BC. He is then thought to have died around three years later. (Note: These dates are those of the People's Republic of China's official Xia–Shang–Zhou Chronology Project, but they remain controversial.)

=== King of Predynastic Zhou ===
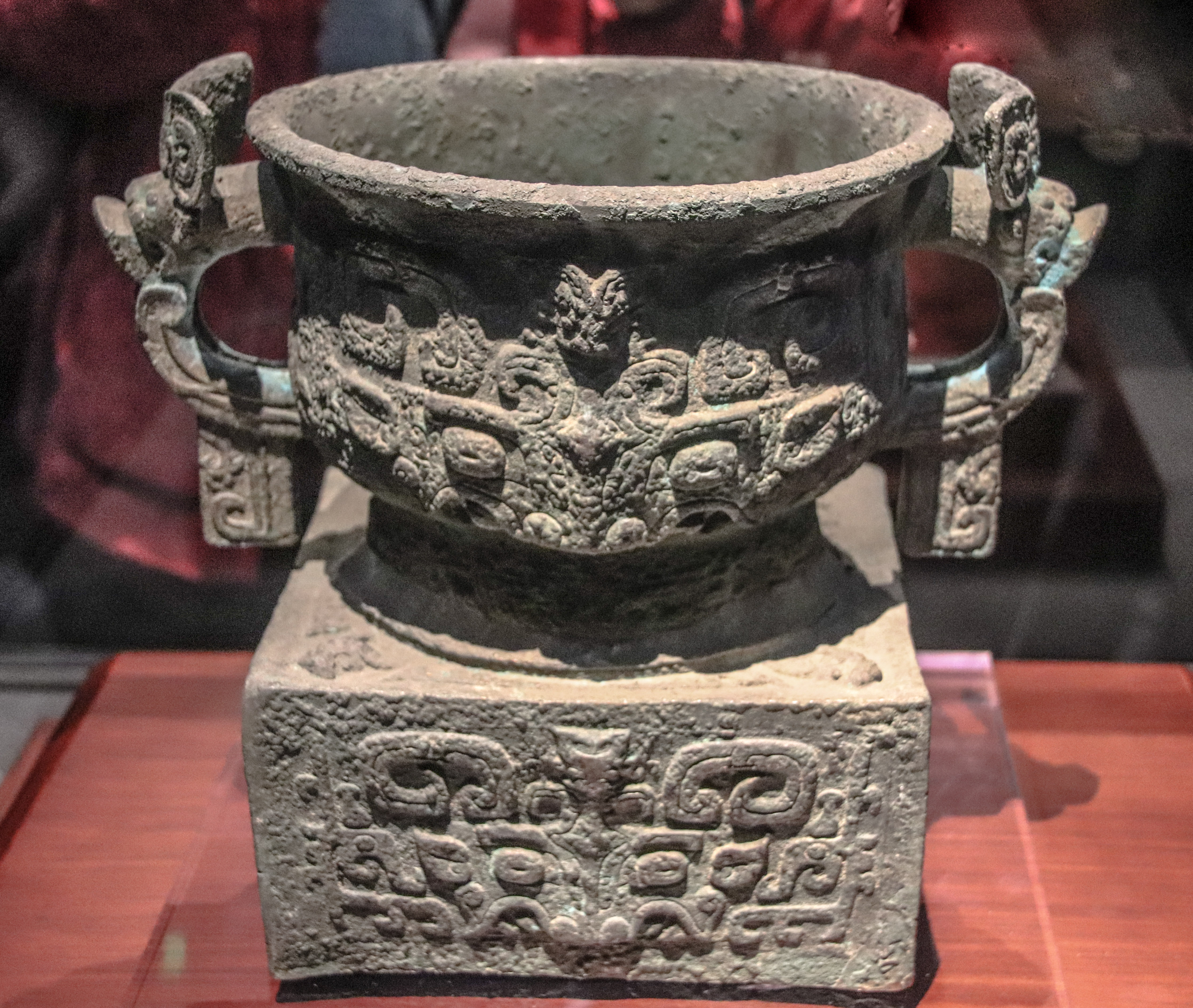
The Li gui, cast seven days after the Battle of Muye.

Upon his succession as king of Predynastic Zhou, King Wu worked with his father-in-law Jiang Ziya to accomplish an unfinished task: overthrowing the Shang dynasty and its ruler, Di Xin, who was alleged to be a cruel and inept tyrant. He resided largely in the capital, Fengjing, and the royal center remained in Zhouyuan (周原) near Mount Qi. (Note: Neither Haojing nor Fengjing have been uncovered in archaeology; most Zhou artifacts are found in and around Mt. Qi.) During the ninth year of his reign, King Wu made a sacrifice at Bi (畢). He was assisted by Duke Dan of Zhou, the Duke of Bi, and the Duke of Shao in carrying out King Wen of Zhou's ambition. He marched down the Yellow River to the Mengjin ford and met with more than 800 elders. He constructed an ancestral tablet with his father's posthumous name and placed it on a chariot in the middle of the host; considering the timing unpropitious, though, he did not yet attack Shang, stating "You still do not know the Mandate of Heaven, it is not yet possible."

Han dynasty accounts claim that during the eleventh year of his reign, allegations made against Di Xin grew worse, with news of him having killed his uncle Bi Gan and imprisoning Jizi reaching King Wu's ears. Taishi Ci (太師疵) and Shaoshi Qiang (少師彊) fled to Zhou with their instruments. King Wu could no longer refrain from attacking the Shang, and on the wumu day of the twelfth month (c. January 21, 1048 BC) led an army of 300 chariots, 3,000 elite warriors, and 45,000 armed soldiers to the Mengjin ford. There, he composed the Great Declaration (泰誓) (Note: The extant Great Declaration is considered a forgery by Mei Ze; the original is lost.) that Di Xin had lost the Mandate of Heaven, and it was time to exact Tian's punishment.

=== Battle of Muye ===
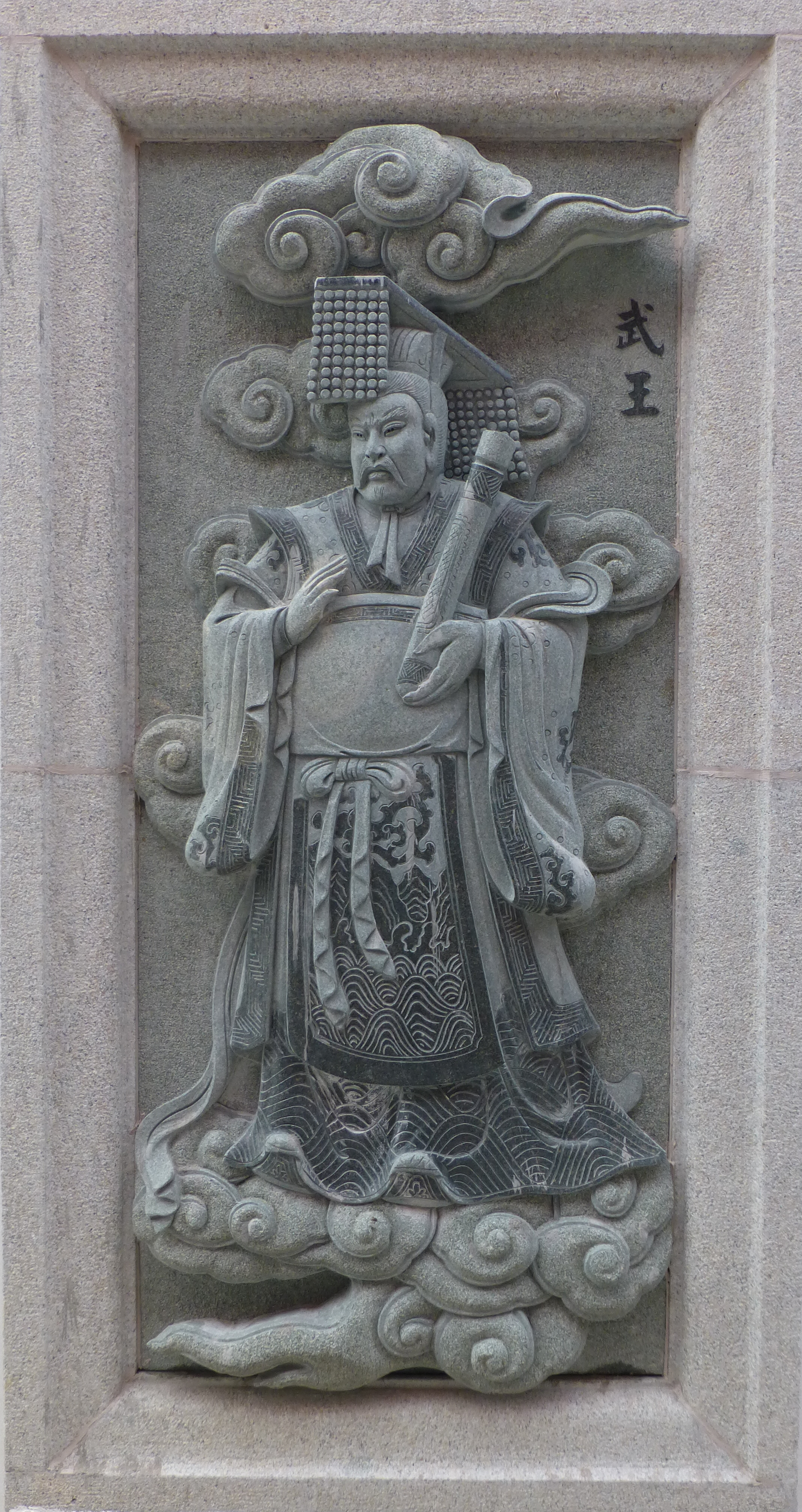
King Wu of Zhou statue at the Ping Sien Si Temple in Perak, Malaysia

On the jiazi day of the second month (c. February 5, 1046 BC) by current estimates, King Wu began his march on Muye. Sima Qian records that two boys, Boyi and Shuqi, remonstrated King Wu and pulled on the reigns of his horses before setting off, believing that the mourning period for King Wen had not finished, and that by attacking Di Xin, he was overstepping a significant boundary between ruler and citizen; therefore, King Wu was breaking away from the filial piety expressed by Emperor Shun and Emperor Yao. The Zhou army wanted to execute the boys, but Jiang Ziya stepped in and led the boys away, after which they would go on a hunger strike until their deaths. As the boys were led away, King Wu took advantage of Shang disunity to begin the attack on the plain along with many neighbouring elders, beginning the Battle of Muye.

Upon approaching the battlefield, King Wu delivered the Oath at Muye (牧誓), recorded in the Book of Documents, which states that King Wu united people from the states of Yong (庸), Shu (蜀), Qiang, (羌), Mao (髳), Wei (微), Lu (盧), Peng (彭), and Pu (濮) to aid his assault. (Note: The given date in this chapter of the Book of Documents matches that of the Li gui.) Di Xin, hearing of the rebellion, deployed 700,000 soldiers to intercept the oncoming assault. Despite the numbers advantage, many Shang soldiers, who were slaves or otherwise disliked Di Xin, defected to King Wu's combined army, allowing for a total defeat. The Battle of Muye destroyed Shang's forces and then-ruler Di Xin set himself and the Deer Terrace Pavilion on fire, killing himself within. The Lost Book of Zhou, condemned by contemporary Confucian scholars, records a similar account, but states that Di Xin was executed alongside two of his consorts (presumably Daji and Jiuhou Nü). Their heads were then brought into the temple on stakes as a sacrifice was being made by King Wu post-conquest, still with blood on his clothes and axe. However, its authenticity is disputed.

The methods used by King Wu at the Battle of Muye are uncertain. Wang Xingguang and Zhang Qiang argue that King Wu had attacked from the north, based on geographic evidence and the manner in which the Yellow River must have flowed at the time.

=== King of China ===
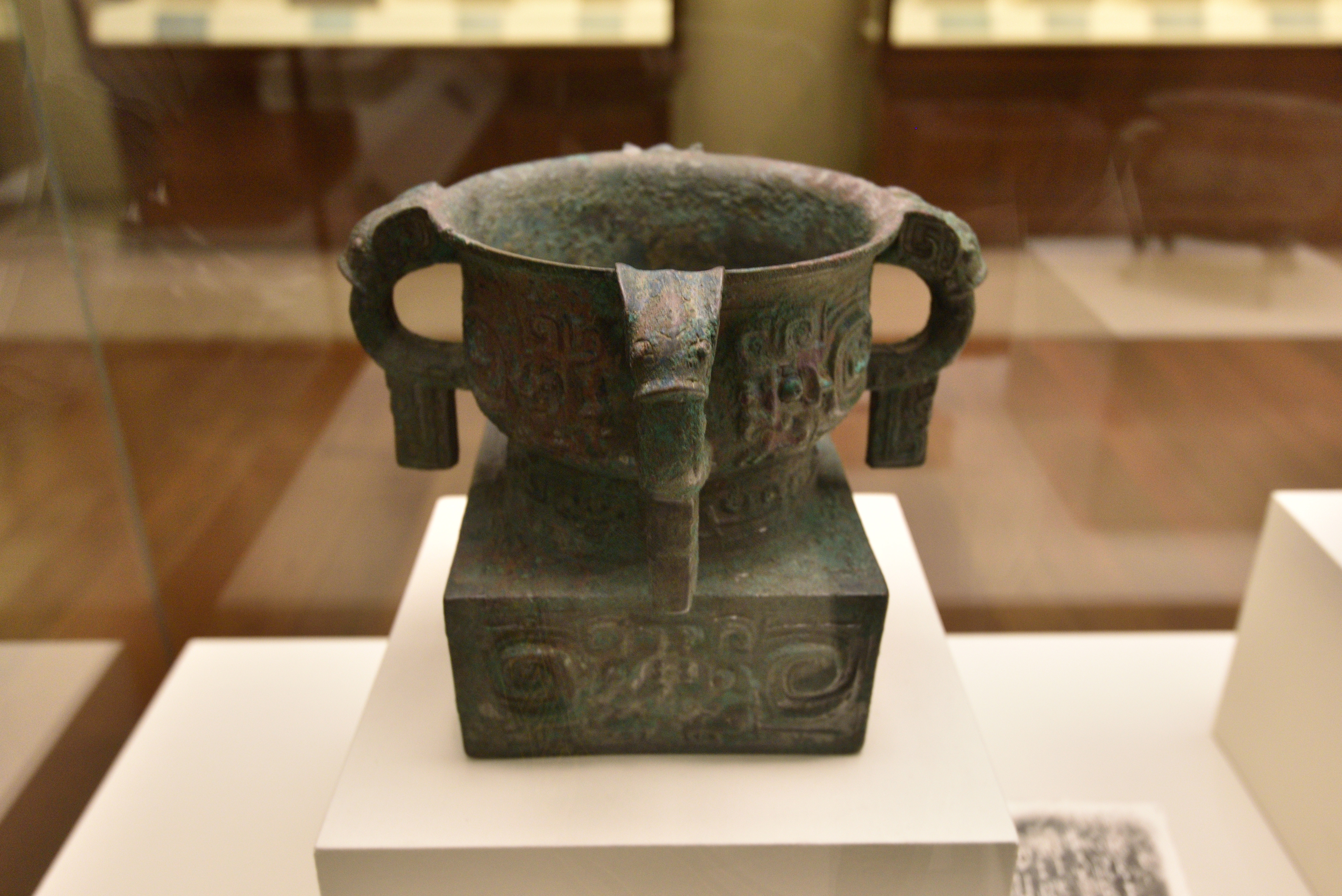
The Tianwang gui, thought to refer to King Wu performing a ritual to King Wen of Zhou.

King Wu followed his victory by composing the Great Martial Music (大武樂). A poem was also made singing praises of his victory that is recorded in the Book of Poetry, Da Ming (大明). The Shi Qiang pan and Yi Zhou Shu imply that King Wu continued his campaign into the Dongyi to eliminate further threats, including the Cuo (虘), Biao (髟), and Yitong (夷童).

Oracle bone evidence from Zhouyuan (周原), Qishan County, seems to imply that King Wu of Zhou had communicated with Shang prince Wu Geng at some point shortly after the Battle of Muye:

…巳，王其乎更，厥父陟。
On the __si day, the King may call Geng; his father then/had ascended.

Lu Guoquan (路国权) and Wang Junmei (王君美) interpret the line geng (更) as being the geng (庚) in Wu Geng's name, using paleographic evidence from Liezi. They furthermore note that the zhi (陟) is a euphemism for Di Xin's death, using evidence from the Book of Documents. (Note: Shang people used similar euphemisms, see 合集 27890, 32029, 32420, 32916, 屯 2384) The scholars therefore believe that Wu Geng was away from Yin at the time and King Wu summoned him to give the news and organise what to do thereafter.

Familiar with Shang ritual culture, within a year, King Wu performed a ritual in Yin. He also made a sacrifice to King Wen of Zhou around this time, which is detailed on the Tianwang gui, thought to date to King Wu's reign. Furthermore, Wu Geng, also known as Lu Fu (禄父) and one of the heirs to the Shang throne, was allowed to preserve his state and continue Shang religious practices. This subdued state would later become the state of Song under Weizi Qi.

After performing the rituals, King Wu moved his court from Feng to the nearby Hao, leaving the older settlement to serve as a site for ancestral temples and gardens. He granted many 'feudal' states to his 16 younger brothers and to clans allied by marriage, which the Bamboo Annals records as having occurred at least a year after his victory. Shuowen Jiezi traces two characters to this precise period, specifically Yu (邘) and Xun (郇), which were granted to his sons. He also enfeoffed Jiang Ziya at Yingqiu, which became Qi; Duke Dan of Zhou was enfeoffed in Qufu, becoming Lu; the Duke of Shao was enfeoffed in Yan, and then his brothers Shu Xian (叔鮮) in Guan and Shu Du in Cai (叔度). The Zuo Zhuan lists Yu (邘), Jin, Ying, and Han (韓) as additional states that were founded by King Wu. Despite his victory, King Wu did not fully understand why Shang had fallen, and upon asking Jizi two years later, he was too uncomfortable to say.

The enfeoffments of Shu Xian and Shu Du, as well as another brother in Shu Chu of Huo (霍叔處), were not arbitrary. These locations were all close to the state of Song, allowing for continuous monitoring of the deposed Shang royal family. It is for this reason that these individuals were called the "Three Guards" (三监). He also allegedly enfeoffed Jizi in Chaoxian (朝鮮), which would become Joseon, Korea.

The Bamboo Annals record King Wu hunting in Mount Song and moving the Nine Tripod Cauldrons to Luo (洛) in his 15th year. In the next year, Jizi came to his court and Pugu (蒲姑) was annihilated. In his final years, he ordered Wang Shizi to recite at his court, and he died in winter, at 54 years old.

== Personal life ==
Little is left regarding King Wu's personal life. He had a wife, Yi Jiang, with whom he had 9 children. He was an adept hunter, with anecdotes stating him catching large amounts of game on his expeditions. King Wu was familiar with Shang ritual practice and able to quickly adapt to a transition process between Shang and Zhou society as hegemony shifted. This is shown in his use of Shang ritual shortly after his conquest, where he paid proper respects to Bi Gan, who had allegedly been killed by Di Xin.

== Illness and death ==
Two years after his victory, in his 14th year, King Wu fell ill. Duke Dan of Zhou prayed for his health, composing jinteng 金縢 "Metal-Bound Coffer" in King Wu's 14th year, which would be repeated in the Book of Documents. Wang Chong repeats the prayer as follows:

予仁若考，多才多藝，能事鬼神。
乃元孫某，不若旦多才多藝，不能事鬼神。

I am benevolent and compliant like my ancestors, possessed of many talents and arts, and am able to serve the ghosts and gods.
As for your primary grandson (King Wu), he is not like me, Dan, in being possessed of many talents and arts, nor is he able to serve the ghosts and gods. (Note: Wang Chong states the "ghosts and gods" (鬼神) refers to the Three Kings; Tang of Shang, King Wen of Zhou, and Yu the Great, and believed that the Three Kings, then, had been deified shortly after King Wu's conquest.)

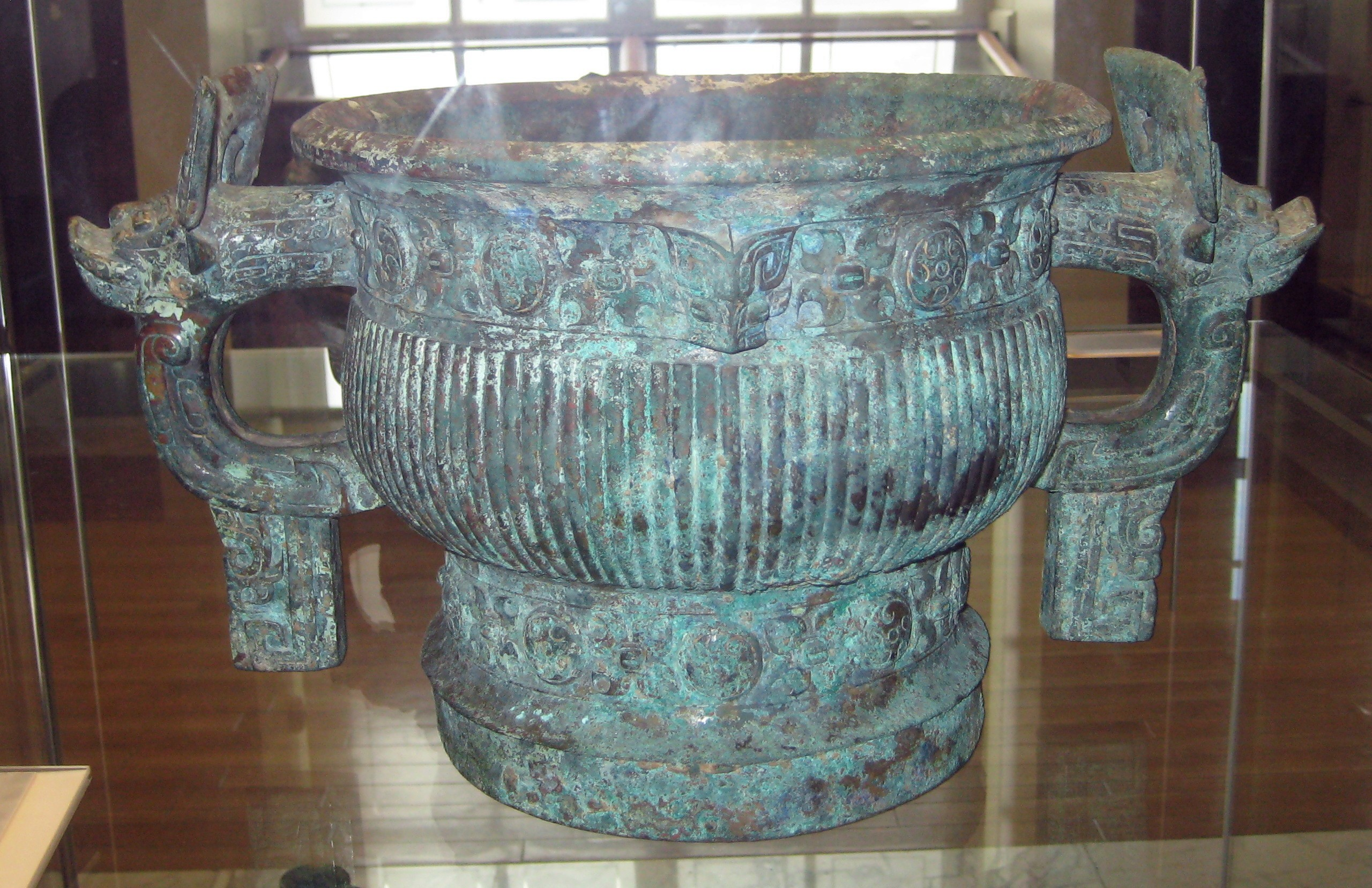
The Kang Hou gui (康侯簋), made after subduing the Rebellion of the Three Guards following King Wu's death.

After 5 years of ruling China, in the 17th year of his rule of the Zhou, King Wu died in the winter. His death provoked several rebellions against his young heir King Cheng and the regent Ji Dan, even from three of his brothers following Wu Geng's conspiracy with them.

=== Tomb ===
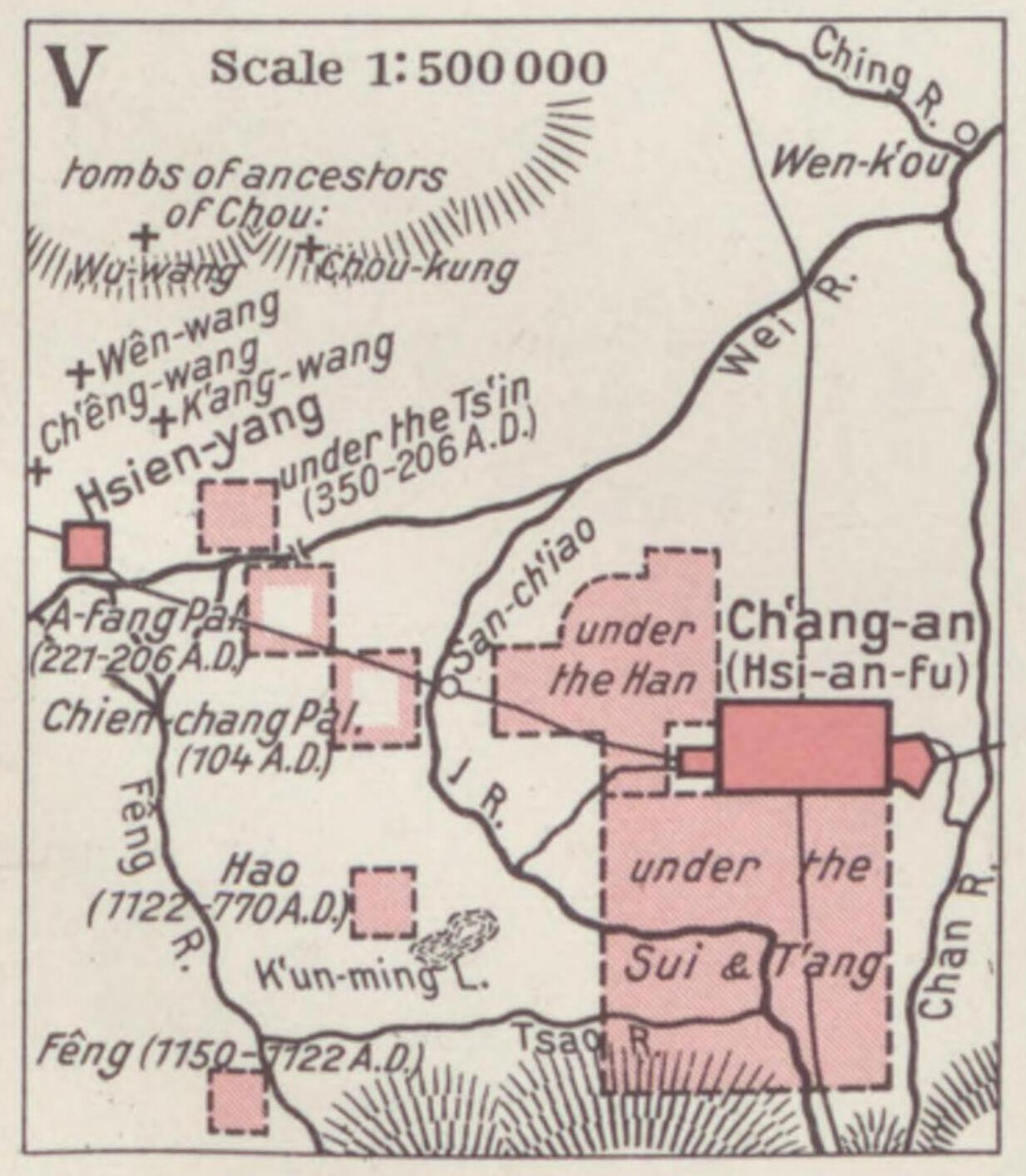
Map of Xianyang and Xi'an, with King Wu's supposed tomb listed in the top-left.

A burial mound at Zhouling in Xianyang Prefecture, Shaanxi, was once thought to be King Wu's tomb. It was fitted with a headstone bearing Wu's name under the Qing dynasty. Modern archeology has since concluded that the tomb is not old enough to be from the Zhou dynasty and is more likely to be that of a Han dynasty royal. The true location of King Wu's tomb remains unknown, though current scholarship points towards Zhou lords in general being buried around Zhougong Miao in Qishan County.

== Legacy ==
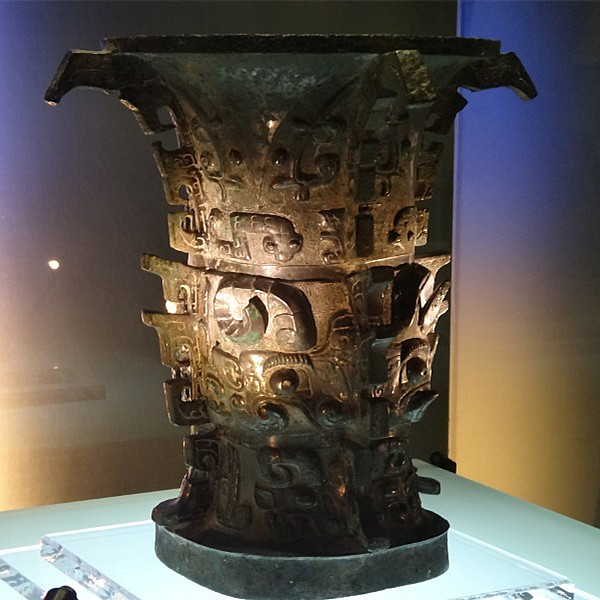
The He zun, which records King Cheng of Zhou extolling King Wu in a sacrifice.

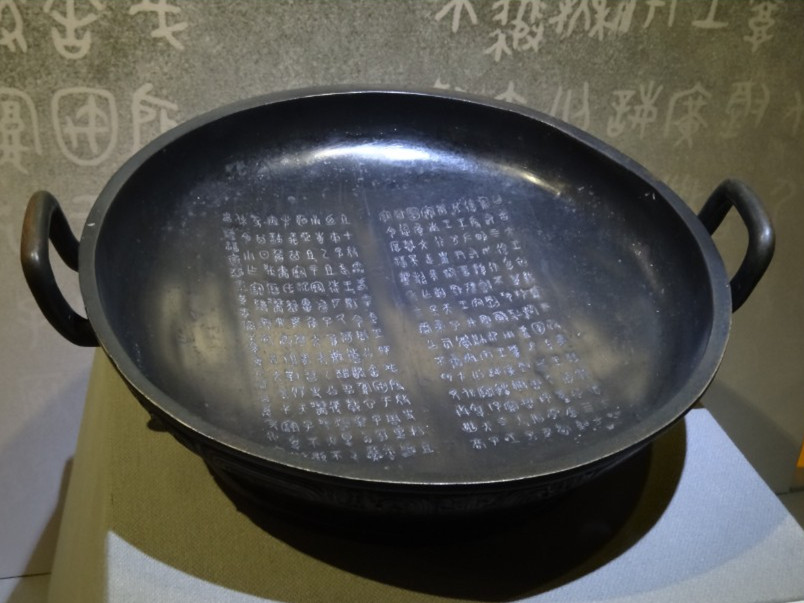
The Shi Qiang pan, which venerates King Wen and King Wu.

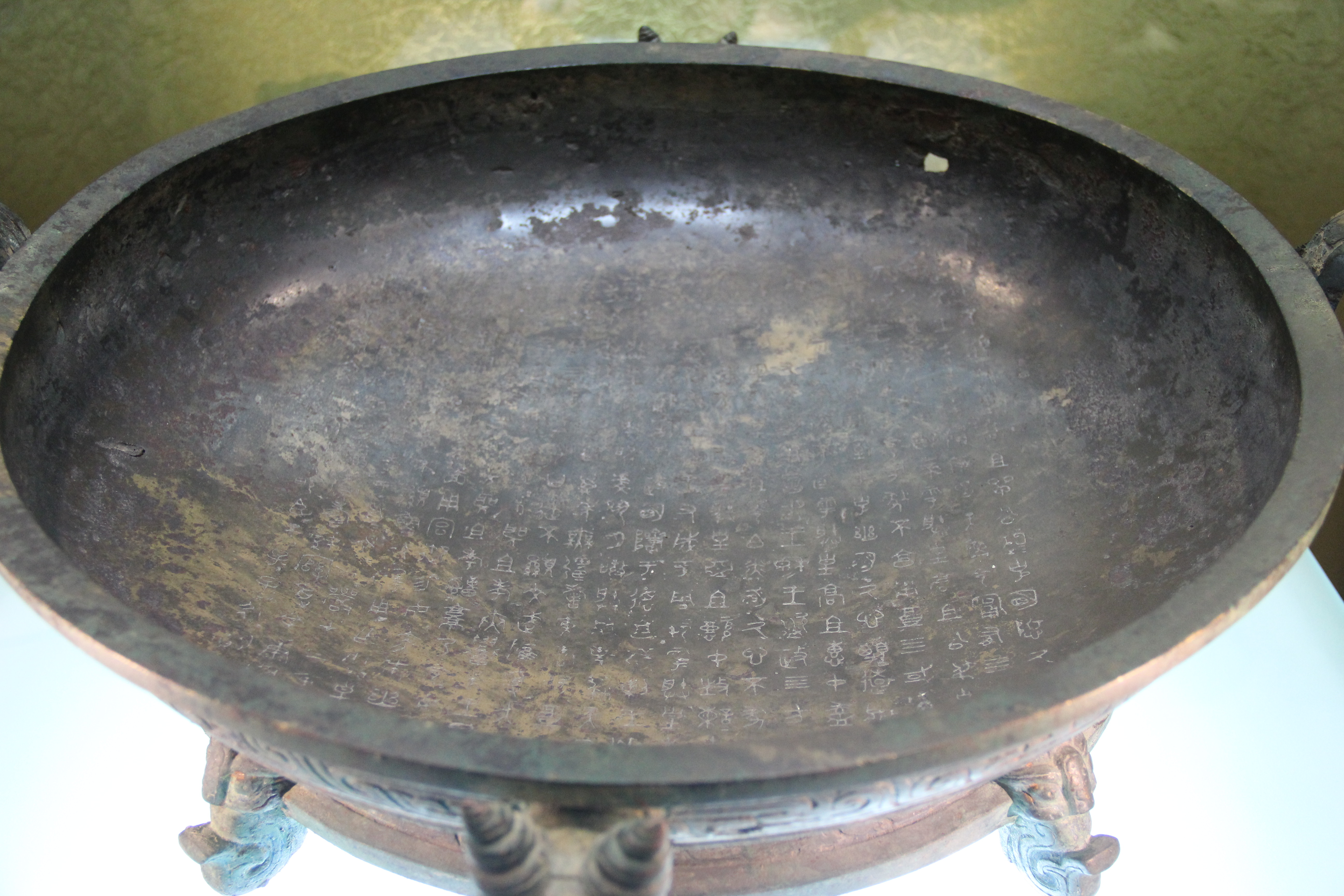
The Lai pan, a bronze venerating King Wen and King Wu.

Ever since his conquest of the Shang dynasty, King Wu of Zhou has been mentioned across Classical Chinese literature as one of the sparks for the Chinese dynastic cycle. Allusions to his exploits can be seen even in bronze inscriptions commemorating his conquest of Yin. He is frequently mentioned alongside Tang of Shang and Yu the Great as the "Three Kings," model rulers to learn from. One such example is the entry-level Three Character Classic, which groups them together alongside King Wen of Zhou.

Despite the nigh-unanimous veneration of King Wu at the time, the Yi Zhou Shu's Shi Fu (世俘) chapter notably portrays him in a more brutal light, taking captives, decapitating Shang soldiers, and going to the temple covered in blood to perform the ritual to King Wen of Zhou. The text was largely ignored by scholars and condemned by Mencius. Furthermore, the received text is extremely corrupted, as shown by quotes in the Book of Han being markedly different.

=== Evaluation within Confucianism ===
King Wu of Zhou is considered a culture hero in Confucianism and a model ruler to learn from, having replicated Tang of Shang's defeat of a perceived tyrannical ruler; in Tang's case, it was Jie of Xia, and in King Wu's case, it was Di Xin.

Xunzi and Mencius defend King Wu's regicide of Di Xin within the thought of the Mandate of Heaven: As Di Xin had seemingly lost the mandate and retired from royal affairs, he was, then, more of a commoner than ruler. Therefore, in the eyes of these two philosophers, it could not be called regicide, but a punitive exhibition. In Xunzi proper, Sun Qingzi (孫卿子) groups King Wu's deposition of Di Xin with that of the Three Sovereigns deposing their archnemeses in addition to Tang of Shang's role. To restrain violence and eliminate harm, it must be reduced by eliminating propagators of greater harm. Within Zhenglun (正論), Xun Kuang also states that as it cannot be called a regicide, it is not so simple to call King Wu an usurper either, as Di Xin did not necessarily control the state to begin with if he had lost the mandate and not managed the people.

Jia Yi talks extensively about King Wu and Tang in opposition to the failed Qin dynasty. In The Faults of Qin, he argues that Qin failed because, unlike Kings Wu and Tang, they sought power without virtue, or in other words, innate power. Because Tang and Wu had expanded their reach and cultivated their innate power, they were able to found dynasties that ruled for hundreds of years, whereas Qin Shi Huang failed to cultivate an effective successor that could make choices with care.

=== Evaluation within Legalism ===
In The Book of Lord Shang, King Wu of Zhou is seen as an example of successful statesmanship without necessarily following antiquity, as different eras require different tools. Tang and Wu had attacked feudal societies and took them over by force, not necessarily relying solely on virtue but on military efficacy. By achieving military supremacy, they were able to mount successful revolutions against inadequate rulers. However, they also understood that to maintain this power, they needed to give rewards to the masses, not simply pay for their military service.

Han Fei, similar to Lord Shang, believes in the idea of enriching the state with new ideas, and uses Tang and Wu as models for this; in new eras, new methods are necessary to maintain a stable state. However, within this model, he also condemns the regicide of Di Xin in the strongest possible terms, as with Tang of Shang's regicide of Jie of Xia. By allowing regicide to occur, the hierarchical society of his era was reduced, thus causing instability. He says:

臣其君，湯、武為人臣而弒其主、刑其尸，而天下譽之，此天下所以至今不治者也。
Tang and Wu, as ministers, assassinated their sovereigns and mutilated their corpses, yet the whole world praised them—this is why the world remains in disorder to this day.

Han Fei therefore expounds an absolutist perspective: Even if a sovereign is not worthy, they should still be served. At the time of writing, the states of Qi and Song had experienced usurpations of their own, which Han Fei believed were due to the precedents set by Tang and Wu.

== Family ==
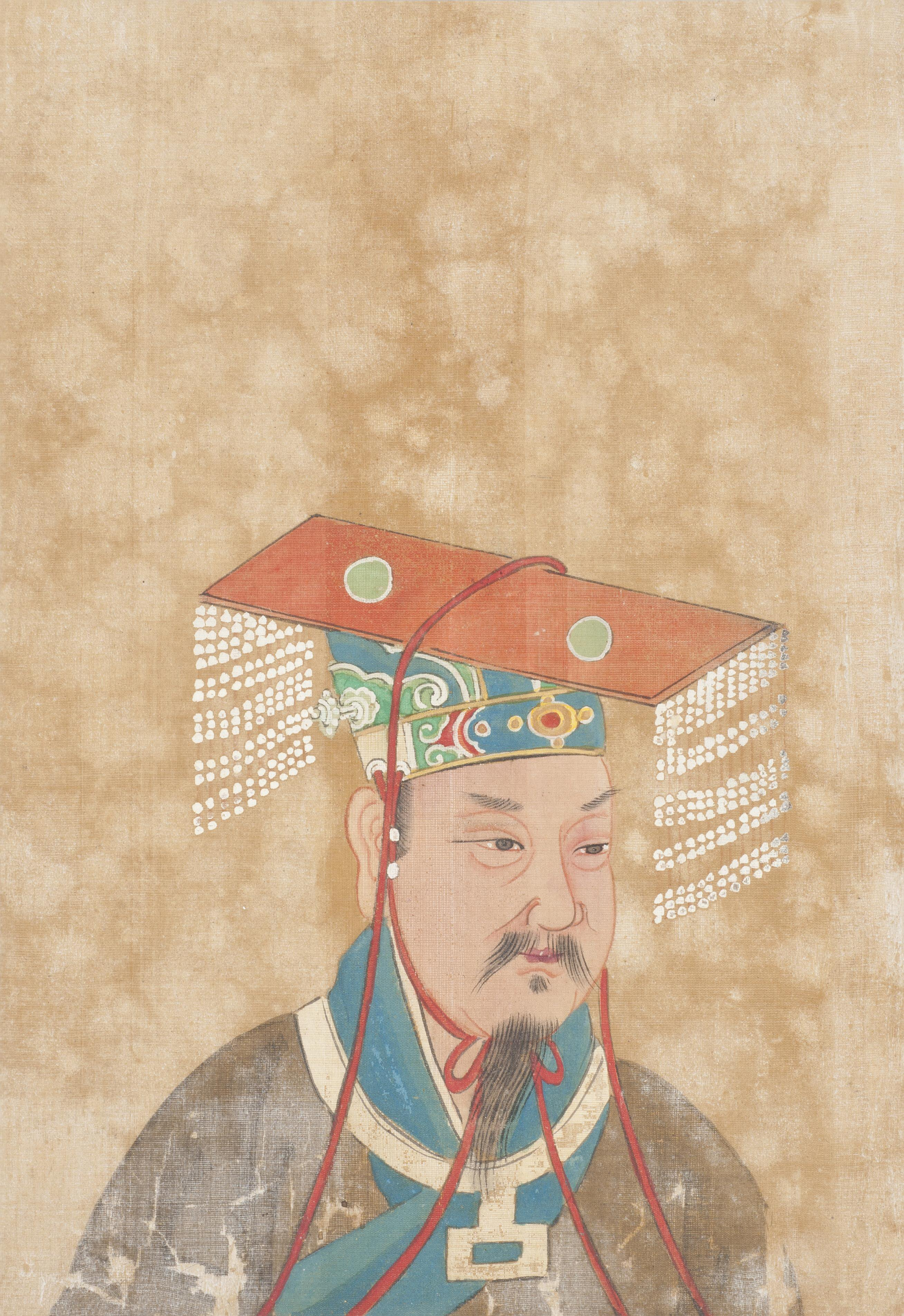
As depicted in the album Portraits of Famous Men c. 1900 CE, housed in the Philadelphia Museum of Art

Queens:

- Yi Jiang, of the Lü lineage of the Jiang clan of Qi (邑姜 姜姓 呂氏), the first daughter of the Great Duke of Qi; the mother of Song and Yu

Sons:

- Prince Song (王子誦; 1060–1020 BC), ruled as King Cheng of Zhou from 1042 to 1021 BC
- Second son, ruled as the Monarch of Yu (邘), the ancestor of the surname Yu (于)
- Third son, Prince Yu (王子虞), ruled as the Marquis of Tang from 1042 BC
- A son who ruled as the Marquis of Ying (應)
- A son who ruled as the Marquis of Han

Daughters:

- First daughter, Da Ji (大姬)
  - Married Duke Hu of Chen (1071–986 BC)
- Youngest daughter, personal name Lan (蘭)
  - Married Duke Yǐ of Qi (d. 933 BC)

== See also ==
- Family tree of Chinese monarchs (ancient)

== Notes ==
King Wu of Zhou Predynastic Zhou / Zhou dynasty Died: 1043 BC
Regnal titles
Preceded by King Wen of Zhou	King of Zhou c. 1050–1046 BC	Succeeded by Himself as King of the Zhou dynasty
Preceded by Di Xin (Shang dynasty)	King of China c. 1046–1043 BC	Succeeded by King Cheng of Zhou
