= King Wen of Zhou =

Ji Chang
- Overlord of the West
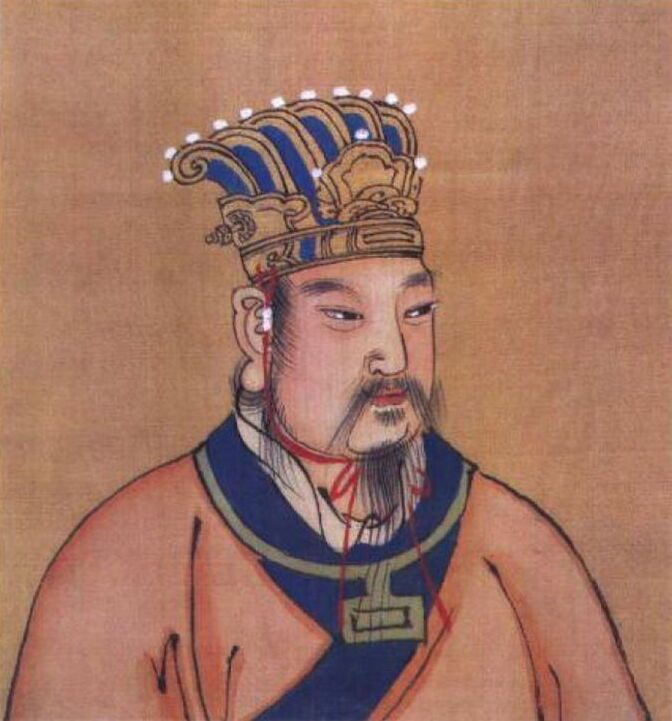
- Imaginary portrait made during the Ming Dynasty

Elder of the Predynastic Zhou
- Reign: 1100–1050 BC (50 years)
- Predecessor: Ji, King of Zhou
- Successor: King Wu of Zhou; Western Zhou established
- Born: 1152 BC (traditional) or 1112 BC (modern estimate); Bi (Zhou state)
- Died: 1050 BC (aged 62); Cheng (Zhou state)
- Burial: Bi (Zhou state)
- Spouse: Tai Si
- Issue: Bo Yikao; King Wu of Zhou; Shu Xian of Guan; Duke Dan of Zhou; Shu Du of Cai; Feng, Count of Wey; Wu, Count of Cheng; Shu Chu of Huo; Zheng, Count of Mao; Zai, Monarch of Dan; Zhenduo, Marquis of Cao; Xiu, Marquis of Teng; Gao, Count of Bi
Posthumous name
- King Wen of Zhou (周文王, lit. "Cultured King of the Zhou")
Temple name
- Shizu (始祖, lit. "First Founder")
- Father: King Ji of Zhou
- Mother: Tai Ren

Ji Chang (Xiahou) (姬昌; 1152–1050 BC), posthumous title King Wen of Zhou (Chinese: 周文王, Zhōu Wén Wáng), was the patriarch lord of the Zhou state during the final years of Shang dynasty in ancient China. Ji Chang himself died before the end of the Zhou–Shang war, but his second son Ji Fa completed the conquest of Shang following the Battle of Muye and posthumously honored him as the founder of the Zhou dynasty. Many of the hymns of the Classic of Poetry are paeans of praise to King Wen. Some consider him the first epic hero of Chinese history.

== Life ==
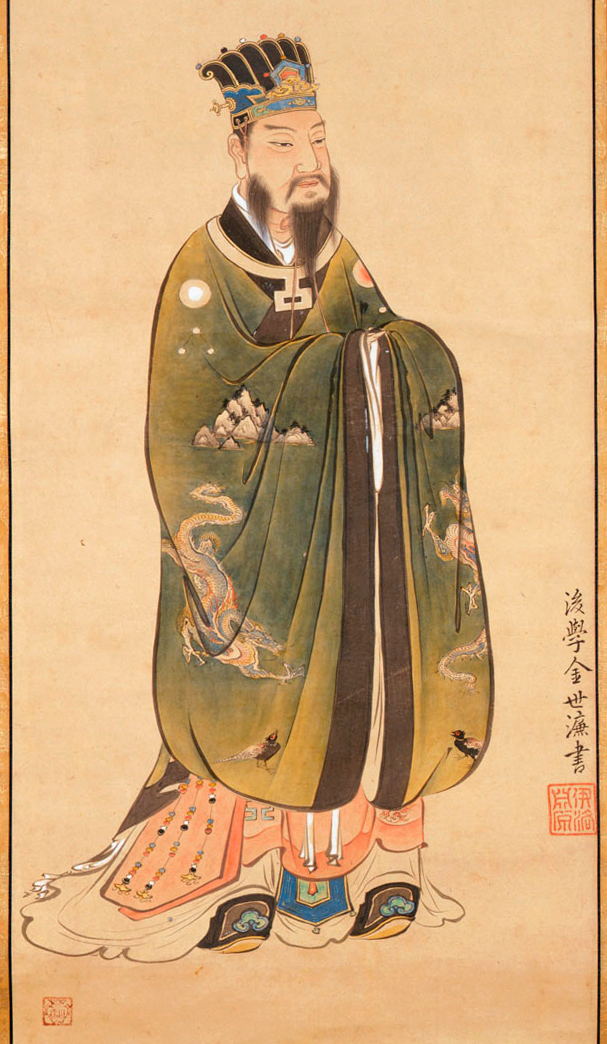
Painting of King Wen of Zhou by Kanō Sansetsu. Japan, Edo period, 1632.

Born Ji Chang (姬昌), Wen was the son of Tairen and Ji Li, the Elder of Zhou, a vassal clan of the Kingdom of Shang along the Wei River in present-day Shaanxi. Jili was betrayed and executed by the Shang king Wen Ding in the late 12th century BC, leaving the young Chang as the Elder of the Zhou lineage. The received text of Mencius literally calls Ji Chang "one of the western barbarians" (西夷之人, Xīyí zhī rén), although commentators gloss this as describing him as "close" to the Xirong and other non-Huaxia tribes.

According to Annals of Zhou in the Records of the Grand Historian, upon becoming the Elder of Zhou, Wen was said to continue his father and their ancestor Hou Ji's legacy by ruling with benevolence, respecting elders while treating the young with kindness, and allowed talented individuals to counsel him. Among these counsellors became important officials of Zhou, such as Yuxiong, San Yisheng, Tai Dian, Guo Shu, and Hong Yao, and later Jiang Ziya. Over time, Wen gained respect and reverence of the other regional lords, whose quarrels were also mediated by Wen.

Wen also placed great importance in agriculture within his domain, with Mencius crediting the well-field system as one of Wen's policies.

King Wen is also credited with having stacked the eight trigrams in their various permutations to create the sixty-four hexagrams of the I Ching. He is also said to have written the judgments which are appended to each hexagram. The most commonly used sequence of the 64 hexagrams is attributed to him and is usually referred to as the King Wen sequence.

During this time, Wen married Taisi and fathered ten sons and one daughter by her, plus at least another eight sons with concubines.

At one point, Di Xin, King of Shang, fearing Wen's growing power, imprisoned him in Youli (present-day Tangyin in Henan) after he was slandered by the Marquis of Chong. His eldest son, Bo Yikao, went to Di Xin to plead for his freedom, but was executed in a rage by lingchi and made into meat cakes which were fed to his father in Youli. However, many officials (in particular San Yisheng and Hong Yao) respected Wen for his honorable governance and gave Di Xin so many gifts – including gold, horses, and women – that he released Wen, and also bestowed upon him his personal weapons and invested him with the special rank of Overlord of the West (Western Shang). Wen offered a piece of his land in Western Luo to Di Xin, who in turn allowed Wen to make one last request. He requested that the Burning Pillar punishment be abolished, and so it was..

Subsequently, upon returning home Wen secretly began to plot to overthrow Di Xin. In his first year as Overlord of the West, he settled a land dispute between the states of Yu and Rui, earning greater recognition among the nobles. One anecdote claims that the rulers of Yu and Rui became ashamed of their dispute once they entered Zhou territory and saw its people sharing their farmlands and caring for the elderly. It is by this point that some nobles began calling him "king". The following year, Wen found Jiang Ziya fishing in the Pan River and hired him as a military counselor. He also repelled an invasion of the Quanrong barbarians and occupied a portion of their land. The following year, he campaigned against Mixu (密須, now Lingtai County in Gansu), a state whose chief had been harassing the smaller states of Ruan and Gong, thus annexing the three of them. The following year, he attacked Li, a puppet of Shang, and the next year he attacked E, a rebel state opposed to Shang, conquering both. One year later he attacked Chong, home of Hu, Marquis of Chong, his arch-enemy, and defeated it, gaining access to the Ford of Meng through which he could cross his army to attack Shang. By then he had obtained about two thirds of the whole kingdom either as direct possessions or sworn allies. That same year he moved his administrative capital city one hundred kilometers east from Mount Qi to Feng, placing the Shang under imminent threat. The following year, however, the Overlord of the West died before he could cross the Ford. Nonetheless, other sources suggest he died in battle during the Zhou campaign against the Shang. The Chinese long preserved a tradition that he had been buried in Cheng, a tribe and city annexed by the Zhou, located between the Jing and Wei Rivers in what is now Xianyang, Shaanxi.

== Legacy ==
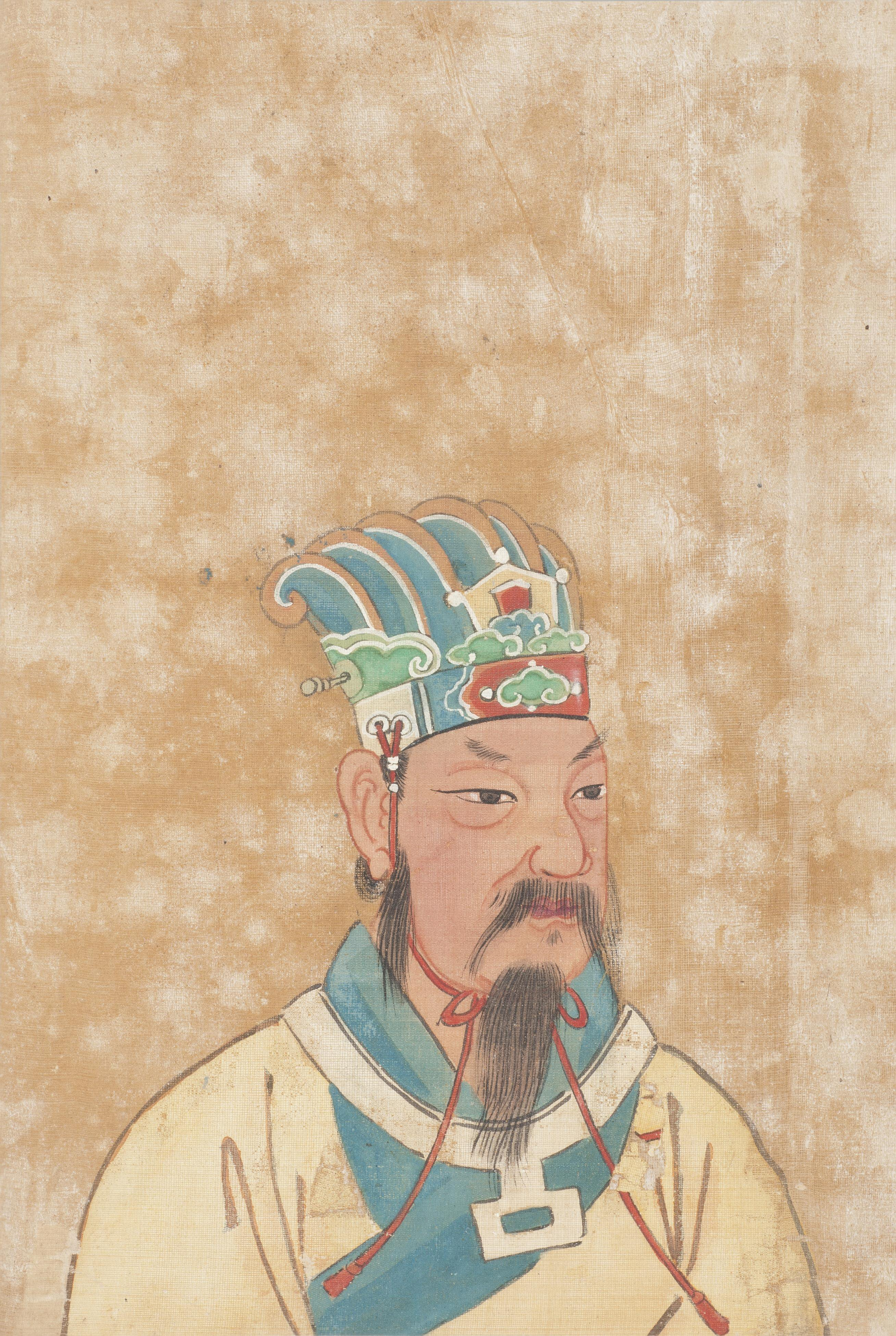
As depicted in the album Portraits of Famous Men c. 1900 CE, housed in the Philadelphia Museum of Art

Four years after Ji Chang's death, his second son Fa, posthumously known as King Wu, followed his footsteps and crushed the Shang at Muye, founding the Zhou dynasty. The name "Wen" now means "the Cultured" or "the Civilizing" and was made into an official royal name by King Wu in honor of his father. He was the only noble to bear the posthumous name "Wen" for almost the entire first half of the Zhou dynasty, despite its common usage as an epithet of eulogy, suggesting a special privilege.

Ah! Solemn is the clear temple,
reverent and concordant the illustrious assistants.
Dignified, dignified are the many officers,
holding fast to the virtue of King Wen.
Responding in praise to the one in Heaven,
they hurry swiftly within the temple.
Greatly illustrious, greatly honored,
may [King Wen] never be weary of [us] men.

— "Eulogies of Zhou – Clear Temple" (Chinese: 清廟; pinyin: Qīng miào)

Many of the older odes from the Classic of Poetry (Shijing 詩經) are hymns in praise of King Wen. He was additionally a great hero of Confucius, whose followers played a significant role in shaping Chinese culture.

Building on a parable between the Yellow Emperor and Guangchengzi in Zhuangzi, Wen is mentioned in Wunengzi during a discourse with advisor Lü Wang, where he convinces Wang the hermit to assist him in saving the collapsing State of Yin. It is justified through claiming that the virtue of wu wei (non-purposive action) in Taoism surrounds heaven and earth, whilst the virtue of purposive action inaugurates and completes things, thus how the Yellow Emperor and Emperor Yao became Sons of Heaven. In other words, if one is obstructed by purposive action, one cannot perform wu wei. This has since been interpreted as an example of early eastern anarchist thought.

In 196 BC, Han Gaozu gave King Wen the title "Greatest of All Kings".

== Mandate of Heaven ==
The theory of political legitimacy that prevailed during the Zhou dynasty and found adherents throughout the following millennia was known as the Mandate of Heaven. According to this theory, Heaven established the sovereign lexically the same way a sovereign would establish a vassal, legitimacy flowed from Heaven's will through the person of the ruler to his lords and his family. The sovereign was held to be Heaven's eldest son in a manner analogous to the patrilineal kin-based society of Predynastic Zhou. If the sovereign was insufficiently virtuous, Heaven would choose a new successor, portended by various omens or disasters. King Wen was said to be mandated by Heaven because the virtue of the Shang kings had declined too greatly. While this political theory gained a great deal of sophistication over time, it seems to have begun with King Wen reading the skies.

In 1059 BC, two unusual celestial phenomena took place. In May, the densest clustering in five hundred years of five planets visible to the naked eye could be seen in the constellation of Cancer, followed a few seasons later by an apparition of Comet 1P/Halley. One or more of these was interpreted by King Wen as a visible sign indicating his divine appointment. Early records, such as the inscription on the Da Yu ding, describe Heaven's Mandate in terms of an actual astronomic event: "the great command in the sky" (天有大令). (Note: 令; líng here is to be read as 命; mìng, which had not yet developed at this early stage of the written language.)

The transmitted record does not place King Wen's receipt of the Mandate in his biography, although the widespread traditions that hold the idea of its existence to be true universally agree that he did receive it at some point during his career. While his conquests, imprisonment, establishments, and rebellion form a traditional relative chronology, the absolute date calculated by modern scholars of the celestial phenomena that formed the seed of what has been called the Zhou dynasty's most important contribution to Chinese political thought cannot be securely slotted into King Wen's timeline.

== Family ==
Wives

- Tai Si, of the Youshen lineage of the Si clan (太姒 姒姓 有莘氏)

Concubines

- Lady, of the Zi clan of Shang (子姓), a daughter of Wen Ding and a younger sister of Di Yi
- Other spouses.

Sons

- By Tai Si:
  - First son: Bo Yikao;
  - Second son: Fa (發); ruled as King Wu of Zhou;
  - Third son: Shu Xian of Guan (鮮), ruled Guan;
  - Fourth son: Duke Dan of Zhou (旦), ruled the Zhou fief,
    - Served as Grand Tutor and regent for King Cheng of Zhou;
    - Dan's son Boqin ruled as Duke of Lu, a younger son succeeded the Zhou fief (prominent descendants included Duke Ding of Zhou of the Gonghe Regency-fame);
  - Fifth son: Shu Du of Cai (度), ruled Cai;
  - Sixth son: Zhenduo (振鐸), ruled Cao;
  - Seventh son: Wu (武), ruled Cheng (郕);
  - Eight son: Shu Chu of Huo (處), ruled Huo;
  - Ninth son: Shu Kang of Wey (封), ruled Kang, then Wey;
  - Tenth son: Zai (載), ruled Ran (冉) or Dan (聃).
- By other spouses:
  - Ruler of Gao 郜;
  - Earl of Yong 雍;
  - Zheng (鄭), Duke of Mao 毛;
  - Xiu (繡), ruler of Teng;
  - Gao 高, ruled as Duke of Bi 畢;
  - Earl of Yuan 原
  - Marquis of Feng 酆
  - Ji Pu, Earl of Xun 郇伯姬葡
  - Possibly Shi 奭, Duke of Shao 召, ruler of Yan (Note: Not listed among King Wen's sons by Book of Han & Yuanhe Xingzuan)
    - Served as Grand Protector to King Cheng
- Yuanhe Xingzuan "Register of surnames of the Yuanhe reign" lists King Wen's sons in a slightly different order of birth:
  - Eldest son: Bo Yikao (伯邑考)
  - Second son: Fa, King Wu of Zhou (周武王)
  - Third son: Shu Xian of Guan (管叔鮮)
  - Fourth son: Duke Dan of Zhou (周公旦)
  - Fifth son: Shu Du of Cai (蔡叔度) (Note: Possibly due to scribal error, Yuanhe xingzuan ranks Du as King Wen's 10th son like Zai. Here Du is treated as the 5th son following Shiji's & Zuozhuan's orderings)
  - Sixth son: Shu Chu of Huo (霍叔處)
  - Seventh son: Wu, Ruler of Cheng (郕叔武)
  - Eight son: Shu Kang of Wey ([衛]康叔封)
  - Ninth son: Zheng, Ruler of Mao (毛叔鄭)
  - Tenth son: Zai, Ruler of Ran (冉 (Note: 𥅆 in Yuanhe Xingzuan; note the same phonetic component 冉; possibly due to scribal error, Yuanhe xingzuan ranks Zai as King Wen's 10th son like Du. Here Zai is treated as the 10th son following Shiji's & Zuozhuan's orderings)季載)
  - Eleventh son: Ruler of Gao (郜叔)
  - Twelfth son: Earl of Yong (雍伯)
  - Thirteenth son: Zhenduo, Ruler of Cao (曹叔振鐸)
  - Fourteenth son: Xiu, Marquis of Teng (滕侯 / 滕叔繡)
  - Fifteenth son: Gao, Duke of Bi (畢公高)
  - Sixteenth son: Earl of Yuan (原伯)
  - Seventeenth son: Marquis of Feng (豐侯) (Note: Possibly due to scribal error, Yuanhe xingzuan ranks him as King Wen's 17th son like the Earl of Xun. Here Marquis of Feng is treated as the 17th son following the ordering of the Zuo Zhuan)
  - Eighteenth son: Ji Pu, Earl of Xun (郇伯姬葡) (Note: Possibly due to scribal error, Yuanhe xingzuan ranks him as King Wen's 17th son like Marquis of Feng. Here Count of Xun is treated as the 18th son following the ordering of the Zuo Zhuan)

== Archaeology ==
Chinese scholars (e.g. Wang Yunwu (王雲五), Li Xueqin (李学勤), etc.) identified King Wen with a 周方白 (Note: Rebus for 伯.); Zhōufāng bó; 'Elder of Zhou region' mentioned in inscriptions H11:82 & H11:84 among oracle bones excavated at Zhouyuan (周原), Qishan County.

== Notes ==
King Wen of Zhou Predynastic Zhou Born: 1152 BC Died: 1056 BC
Regnal titles
Preceded by Ji, King of Zhou	King of Zhou; 1099 – c. 1050 BC	Succeeded by King Wu of Zhou
