= Earl of Mei =

11th-century BC ruler of Mei, China

Earl of Mei 梅伯
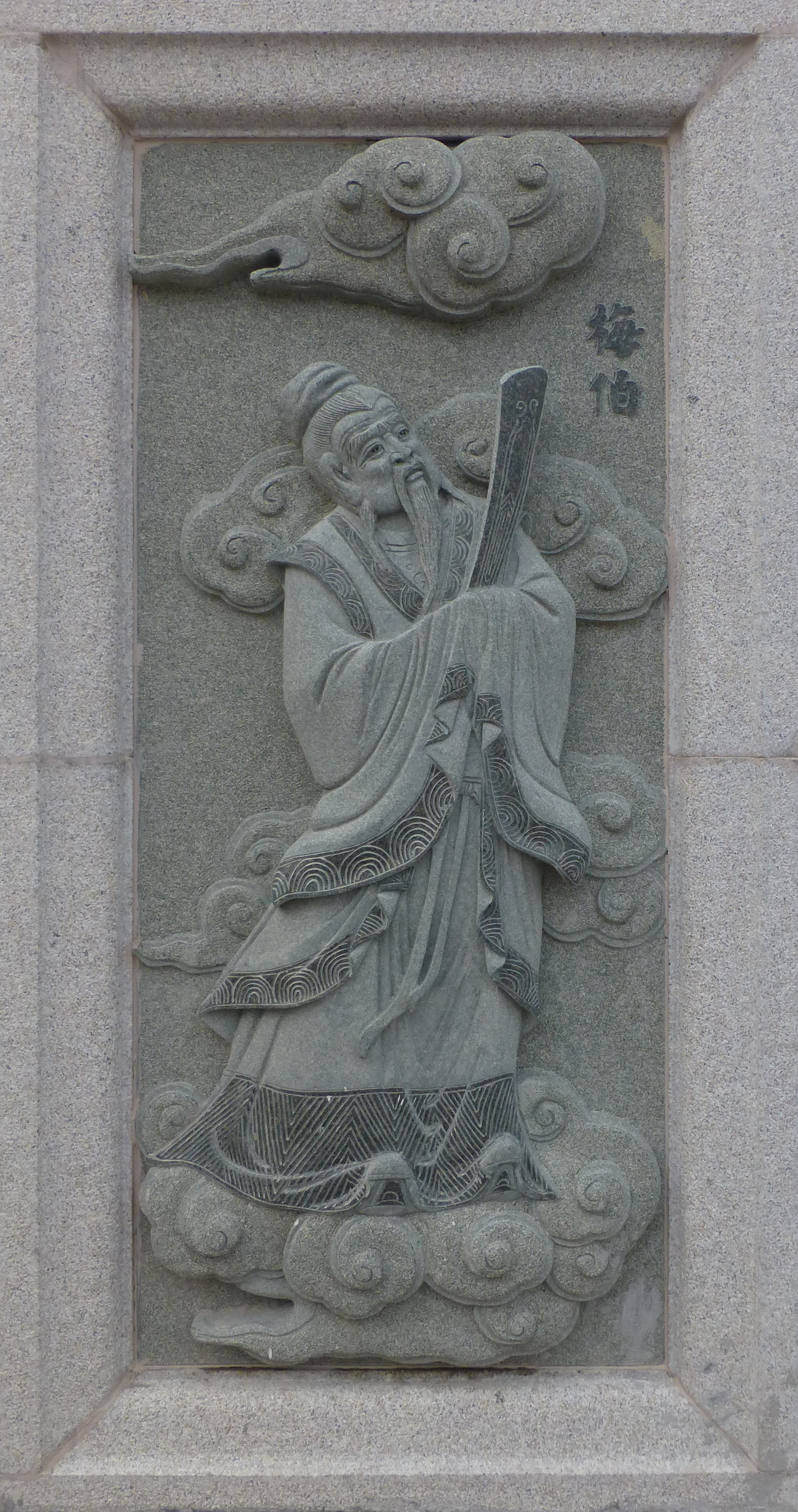
- Photograph from the Ping Sien Si Temple in Perak, Malaysia

Earl of Mei
- Reign: c. 1000-1040 BCE
- Died: Shang dynasty

Chinese name
- Chinese: 梅伯
Transcriptions
Standard Mandarin
- Hanyu Pinyin: Méi Bó

The Earl of Mei (Chinese: 梅伯; pinyin: Méi Bó) ruled the State of Mei during the Late Shang period, acting as a vassal for Di Xin, who he was allegedly killed for criticizing.

== In traditional historiography ==
Little is known about the Earl of Mei; even his given name is seemingly unknown. He Guangyue believes was enfeoffed in Meishan (梅山, in modern-day Henan), and later texts state that he was a descendent of the brother of Tang of Shang.

Various sources, such as Chunqiu Fanlu and Heavenly Questions in the Chu Ci, state that Di Xin minced him into meat and turned him into a stew (Note: The punishment is known as hai (醢)) after repeatedly criticising the king. After this, his state was destroyed. While this is not mentioned in texts such as Records of the Grand Historian or the Bamboo Annals, excavated texts such as Zifan Ziyu (子犯子余) in the Tsinghua Bamboo Slips cache transmit an accounts of the deaths of three people, from which comparisons have been drawn to the deaths of the daughter of the Marquess of Jiu, the Marquess of E, and the Earl of Mei. Particularly, the phrase 胚之女, or 梅之女, if read in the latter sense, could imply that the daughter of the Marquess of Jiu was introduced by the Earl of Mei.

After King Wu of Zhou defeated Di Xin at the Battle of Muye, he enfeoffed a descendent of the Earl of Mei in Huangmei (黄梅), rebuilding the destroyed state, which then became the origin of the modern surname "Mei" and later a province of Wu.

== Plot in fiction ==
In Fengshen Yanyi, Mei Bo is renowned as the Number One Grand Counselor to King Zhou himself; thus Mei Bo is a very high-ranking official under the Shang dynasty.

After Mei Bo had seen Royal Astrologer Du being escorted by guards through the Noon Gate, Mei Bo questioned Du and then ran off quickly to discuss matters with the king. With the assisted help of Prime Minister Shang Rong, Mei Bo effectively seized the chance to talk matters with the ignorant king. Mei Bo first barks at the king about the unjust punishment and soon death of Du, who was a loyal astrologer serving under the kingdom for over three generations. Mei Bo constantly tells the king that wiping out one of your most loyal officials without just cause is such that of removing a section of your own body. After the king ignored Mei Bo's words, he sentenced him to death through beating.

The king's favorite concubine, Daji, tells King Zhou it would be best to burn him alive in a large toaster for his "evil ways". When the toaster was finished, it had been over twenty feet tall with three levels of burning fire from three levels of burning charcoal; and two wheels to move it around like a chariot. Before Mei Bo was to be burned alive in the toaster, he uttered the words "You stupid king! My death is as light as a feather. It matters very little whether I die or live. I am one of your highest ranking counselors. I have served three generations of kings in this dynasty. What crime have I committed? I only fear that Cheng Tang's glorious reign will end by your stupidity and cruelty!"

Thus, the poor Mei Bo was stripped of all his clothes and was immediately thrown into the very large toaster. While in the toaster, large blood-curdling screams could be heard emitting from the toaster – thus instilling complete horror into the fellow officials and marking the death of one of many Shang loyalists.

Mei Bo was appointed as the deity of Tiande Star (天德星) in the end.
