= Weizi =

Weizi may refer to:

== People ==
- Weizi of Song (fl. 11th century BC), proper name Zi Qi, also known as Weizi, brother of Di Xin and the first ruler of Zhou's state Song
- Wei Zi (born 1956), Chinese actor

== Places in China ==
- Weizi, Shanxi (微子), a town in Changzhi, Shanxi
- Weizi, Sichuan (卫子), a town in Guangyuan, Sichuan
- Weizi Subdistrict (围子街道), a subdistrict in Changyi, Shandong
