= Youli =

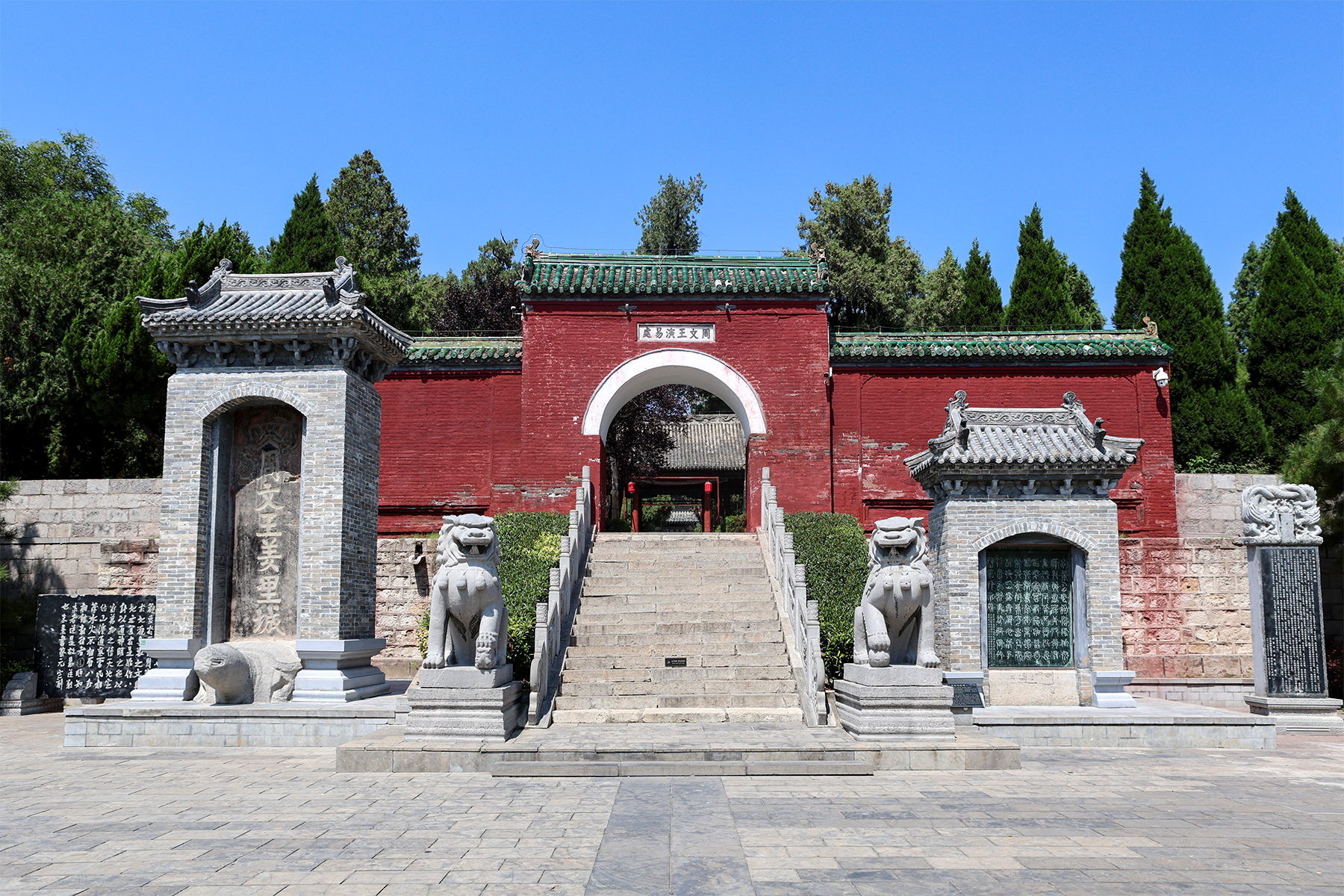
Youli City Ruins, Anyang.

Youli (Chinese: 羑里; pinyin: Yóulǐ) was a settlement in ancient China. It was the location of Di Xin's imprisonment of Ji Chang (posthumously King Wen of Zhou). It was during this captivity that he was said to have constructed the 64 hexagrams of the Classic of Changes.

== Archaeology ==
A site identified as Youli city was found in Anyang, Henan, four kilometres north of Tangyin County. It covers 1 hectare, with human activity dating to the Neolithic era.
