= Huo (state) =

Vassal state in China

State of Huo 霍
- c. Pre-11th century–661 BC
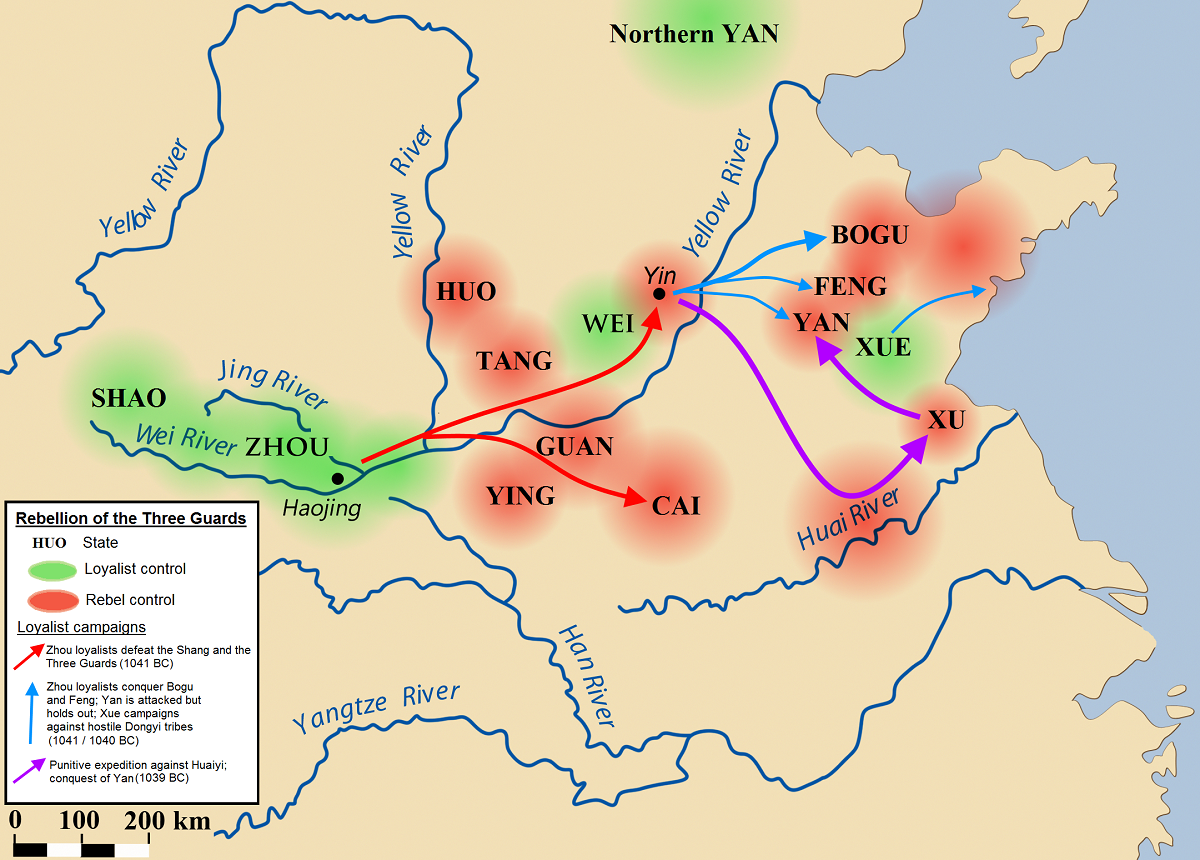
- Map of the Rebellion of the Three Guards, featuring Huo.
- Capital: Huo (modern day Huozhou, Shanxi)
- Common languages: Old Chinese
- Religion: Shang state religion Tian worship
- Government: Monarchy
- Marquess (侯)
  - Before c. 1046 BC: Marquess of Huo
  - After c. 1046 BC: Shu Chu of Huo
- Historical era: Shang dynasty Western Zhou; Spring and Autumn period
  - Established: c. Pre-11th century
  - Di Yi attacks the Yinmeifang (陰美方) (Note: The actual 陰 graph is ridiculous: 屵 + 酓 + 云): c. 1091 BC
  - Battle of Muye Marquess Huo captured: c. 1046 BC
  - Installing of Shu Chu of Huo: c. 1045 BC
  - Rebellion of the Three Guards: c. 1042–1039 BC
  - Conquered by Jin: 661 BC
Succeeded by
[[Jin]]

The state of Huo was a vassal state in China, which lasted from the Shang dynasty to the early years of the Spring and Autumn period.

== History ==
=== Shang dynasty ===
The earliest mention of Huo dates back to the Shang dynasty, specifically during the reign of Di Yi. After a fierce battle against the Yufang, Di Yi resided in Huo for 5 months and repeatedly divinated about his army's prospects. After that, he launched a campaign against the Yinmeifang (陰美方), which would last for several months.

=== Battle of Muye ===
The Lost Book of Zhou records that the Marquess of Huo was captured during the Battle of Muye, and Shu Chu of Huo was installed, elevating the state to one of the Three Guards. The fact Shu Chu was installed was noticed as soon as the Qing dynasty.

After the Battle of Muye that brought the reign of Di Xin and his dynasty to an end, King Wu of Zhou enfeoffed his brothers in three states, among others, to break off the connection between the Shang dynasty and the Dongyi. Huo was one such state, along with Cai and Guan. Their rulers, Shu Du of Cai and Shu Xian of Guan, along with Shu Chu of Huo, were known as the Three Guards (三公). This ensured the security of the burgeoning Western Zhou dynasty.

=== Rebellion of the Three Guards ===
King Wu of Zhou died 3 years into his reign, leaving his son, Cheng, to pick up the pieces from the Battle of Muye. Ji Dan, the Duke of Zhou, served as regent, acting as de facto ruler over the region. Wu Geng, the interim ruler of Yin, now partitioned into Bei, colluded with the Three Guards, believing that a Duke should not claim regency, and that as the previous rulers of China, he should rule. This revolt was defeated, and Shu Chu was stripped of his titles and demoted to a commoner for three years. Subsequently, however, the lands of Huo were given to Shu Chu's son, thereby continuing the rule of their branch, which would last until 661 BC when the state was annexed by Jin.
