= Yufang =

Shang dynasty state

Yufang 盂方
- c. 1100 BCE–?
- Map of Late Shang states.
- Common languages: Old Chinese
- Government: Fangguo
- Earl (伯)
  - c. 1100 CE?: Yan, Earl of Yufang (盂方伯炎)
- Historical era: Shang dynasty
  - Established: c. 1100 BCE
  - War with Late Shang: c. 1092 BCE
  - Disestablished: ?
- Today part of: Henan

Yufang
- Chinese: 盂方
Transcriptions
Middle Chinese
- Middle Chinese: hju pjang
Old Chinese
- Baxter–Sagart (2014): /*[ɢ]ʷ(r)a paŋ/
- Zhengzhang: /*ɢʷa paŋ/

The Yufang was an ancient Chinese state categorised as a fangguo by the Late Shang people, which existed around the reign of Di Yi. It is noted for waging a significant war against the Shang dynasty.

== Name ==
A yu bowl.

Yu (盂) is a name to a type of bronzeware, specifically a kind with two handles and no cover, used for sacrificial offerings of wine or food.

== History ==
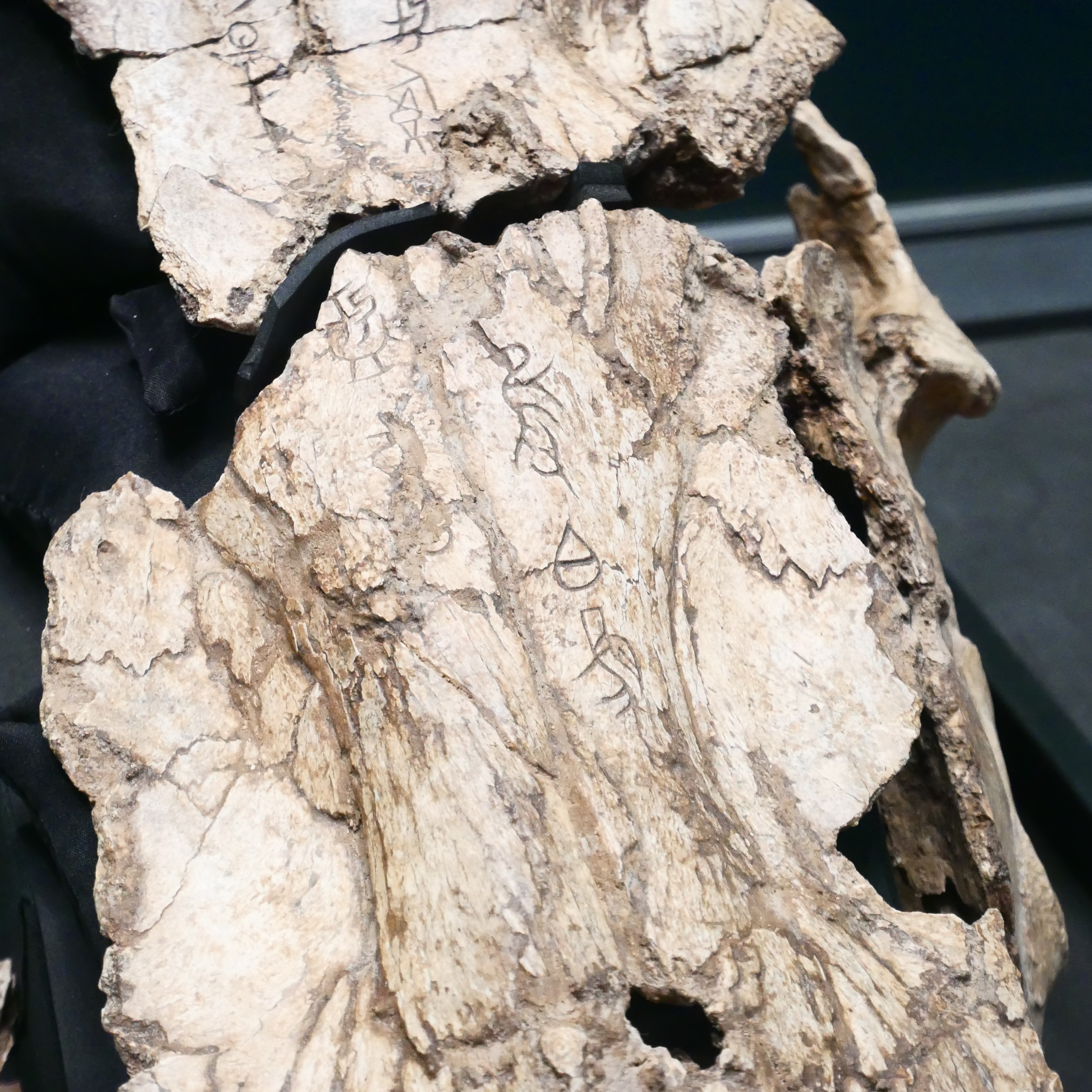
Short-horned water buffalo oracle bone dated to around the time of the Yufang campaign.

The Yufang are mentioned as having attacked the Shang in the 9th year of Di Yi's reign, with no documented mentions prior to that point. The inciting incident appears to be noted in Hebu《合補》11242:

甲戌王卜，貞：……盂方率伐西或（國），……西田，……盂方，綏余一人，余其比多田甾征盂方，亡左自上下于徹……
On the Jiawu day, the King (Di Yi) performed scapulimancy. Charge: The Yufang have led an invasion into the Western Kingdom (Xiguo?) [...] Western fields [...] the Yufang, they approach. I, the ruler, shall mobilize the tian (田) to launch a punitive expedition against the Yufang. But will there be assistance from my ancestors?

A joining of Heji《合集》36518 and Cunbu《存補》5.146.1 reveals that the Yufang had seemingly rebelled and stationed themselves in a place called Gao (高):

乙巳，王貞：啟呼祝曰：「盂方人，其出伐，屯高」，其令束䢔于高，弗每，不萈（緩）翦。王占曰：吉。其令束䢔高，每。吉。在九月。
On the Yisi day, the King (Di Yi) charged: "The people of the Yufang are attacking and have stationed themselves in Gao." Should I order my troops to subdue(?) Gao, but not every time, and not to slack? The king prognosticated: Auspicious. Should we order [this], each time, [is that right]? Auspicious. It was in the ninth month.

Jiang Yubin (蔣玉斌) argues this was a rebellion based on reading tun (屯) in its respective oracle bone inscription as chun (蠢) "to wriggle." This would make sense, as having an Earl (伯) implies some amicable relations with the Shang state prior to the war. Little is known about the war itself, including the outcome, though an inscription from Di Yi's tenth year describes him hunting a short-horned water buffalo on his way back from an excursion.

== Location ==
The Yufang was seemingly located in Henan, west of Yin, but the precise settlement has not been identified. Based on geographic descriptions, Ma Panpan (2022) argues that the Yufang must have been attacking from the west of Shang, given proximity to the Qinyang (沁陽) region in which Di Yi would hunt animals. However, Guo Moruo argued that it must have been southeast, which relied on a theory that Di Yi was also fighting a war against the Renfang; this is generally not held anymore and attributed to Di Xin instead. The Chinese Historical Dictionary (中国历史大辞典) suggests Sui County, Henan. Wang Guowei identifies the Yufang as possibly sharing a location with Yu (邘), a state that King Wen of Zhou campaigned against whilst dismantling Di Xin's allies. Based on geography, this would place the Yufang in Qinyang.

There is a nation of Yu mentioned in the Spring and Autumn Annals using the same character, where feudal lords met with a Duke of Song some time around 639 BCE. Song as a state was in an area of a similar location to the historic Shang capital, effectively being a successor state. However, its connection to the Yufang is uncertain at best, as this meeting took place around 600 years after Di Yi's war, and no mentions of the Yufang have been found in Western Zhou texts to establish continuity.
