= Huo (disambiguation) =

Huo is a Chinese surname.

Huo or HUO may also refer to:

- Huo (state), a vassal state in ancient China
- Holingol Huolinhe Airport, an airport serving Holingol, Inner Mongolia, China (IATA code HUO)
- Wok, a kind of cooking vessel (pronounced huò in Mandarin)
- Hu language, a Palaungic language spoken in Yunnan, China (ISO 639 code huo)
