= Shang Rong =

Shang Rong 商容
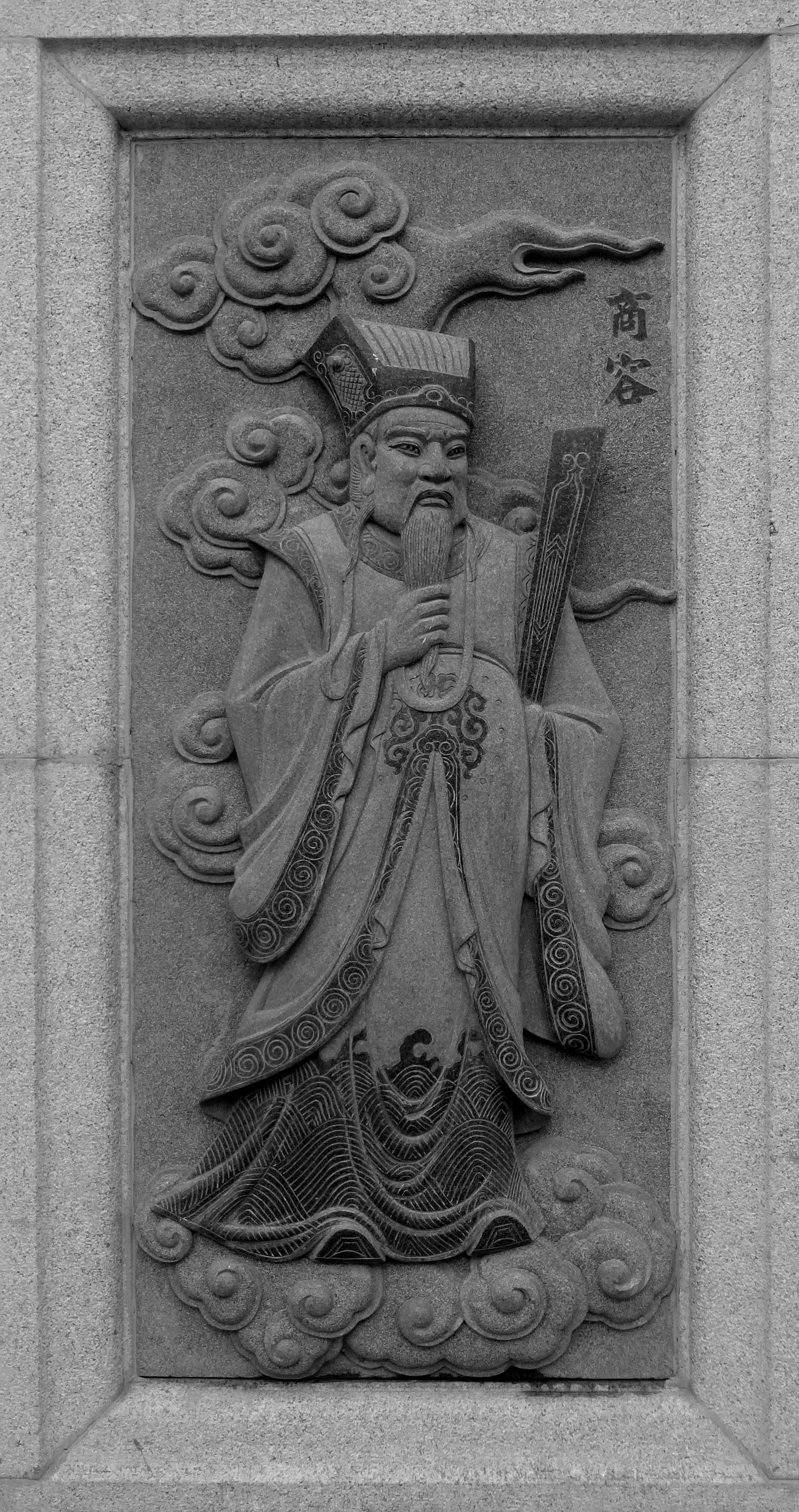
- Photograph from the Ping Sien Si Temple in Perak, Malaysia

Minister for the Shang dynasty
- Monarch: Di Xin

Personal details
- Known for: Serving Di Xin; Honor received from King Wu of Zhou

Chinese name
- Chinese: 商容
Transcriptions
Standard Mandarin
- Hanyu Pinyin: Shāng Róng

Shang Rong (Chinese: 商容; pinyin: Shāng Róng) was a high official during the reign of Di Xin in the Late Shang period. He is also a major character featured in the classic Chinese novel Fengshen Yanyi.

== Name ==
Han dynasty scholar Zheng Xuan (郑玄) argued that Shang Rong's name may be more accurately described as a title, with Shang referring to the state and Rong (容) being a job title, referring to the word "Rongtai" (容台). Therefore, the name could be regarded as "Shang's Minister of Rites".

== In traditional historiography ==
In Records of the Grand Historian, Sima Qian records Shang Rong as one of several ministers of Di Xin, wanting to invade Predynastic Zhou but deciding against it. Instead, he wanted to change Shang from within, hoping to persuade Di Xin to walk down a more positive path. However, despite exhausting all efforts, he failed, and was dismissed from office. After the death of King Wen of Zhou, the next ruler, King Wu, began the Battle of Muye, leading to the Shang dynasty's demise. After the war, King Wu freed Jizi, and then ordered him to restore and rehabilitate Shang Rong to his position, and marked a gate (閭) in his honour. He is also recorded as having been offered to be made one of the Three Dukes (三公) of King Wu, but refused, believing himself inadequate. He would later live in the Taihang Mountains.

Huainanzi claims that Laozi, the founder of Daoism, had studied under Shang Rong. However, the earliest sources make no mention of Shang Rong as a philosopher.

== Plot in Fengshen Yanyi ==
Shang Rong is renowned as the head Prime Minister over the Shang dynasty – in which he has served for over three generations. Upon seeing the growing cruelty of the king, Shang Rong is too filled with grief to stay in the kingdom. Thus, he asks to be pardoned. Soon after the king has given his consent, Shang Rong is confronted by many loyal officials of the dynasty, who headed out to say a tearful farewell to their respected friend. While addressing the officials outside the capital, Zhaoge, Shang Rong spoke as follows: "My dear princes and colleagues, I would be glad to give my life if I knew it would do any good. You are the pillars of the country; do your best to save the kingdom. Let us drink to old times and I know we will see each other again." Thus, after speaking to the officials and composing a short poem as a symbol of his internal anguish, Shang Rong took his leave of the dynasty.

Later on, following the prince-capturing arc, the Crown Prince runs into the home of the retired prime minister, Shang Rong. After Shang Rong heard the whole story about this incident, he sets out once again in an attempt to instill some level of intelligence into Di Xin. After a harsh conflict with the king, Shang Rong continuously remonstrates the king over his foolish ways. Soon enough, even after receiving the threat of being beaten to death with a golden mallet, Shang Rong, speaking in immense anger, says these, his final words: "I am not afraid to die! But I must ask your late father, my old king Di Yi, to pardon me, his old Prime Minister, for recommending you for the throne. I am so sorry that I cannot help anyone anymore!" Thus, immediately following this, Shang Rong ends his life by banging his head against a nearby column, in order to put his great resentment to a concluding rest.

Shang Rong was appointed as the deity of Yutang Star (玉堂星) in the end.
