= Di Yi =

Shang dynasty king

Di Yi 帝乙
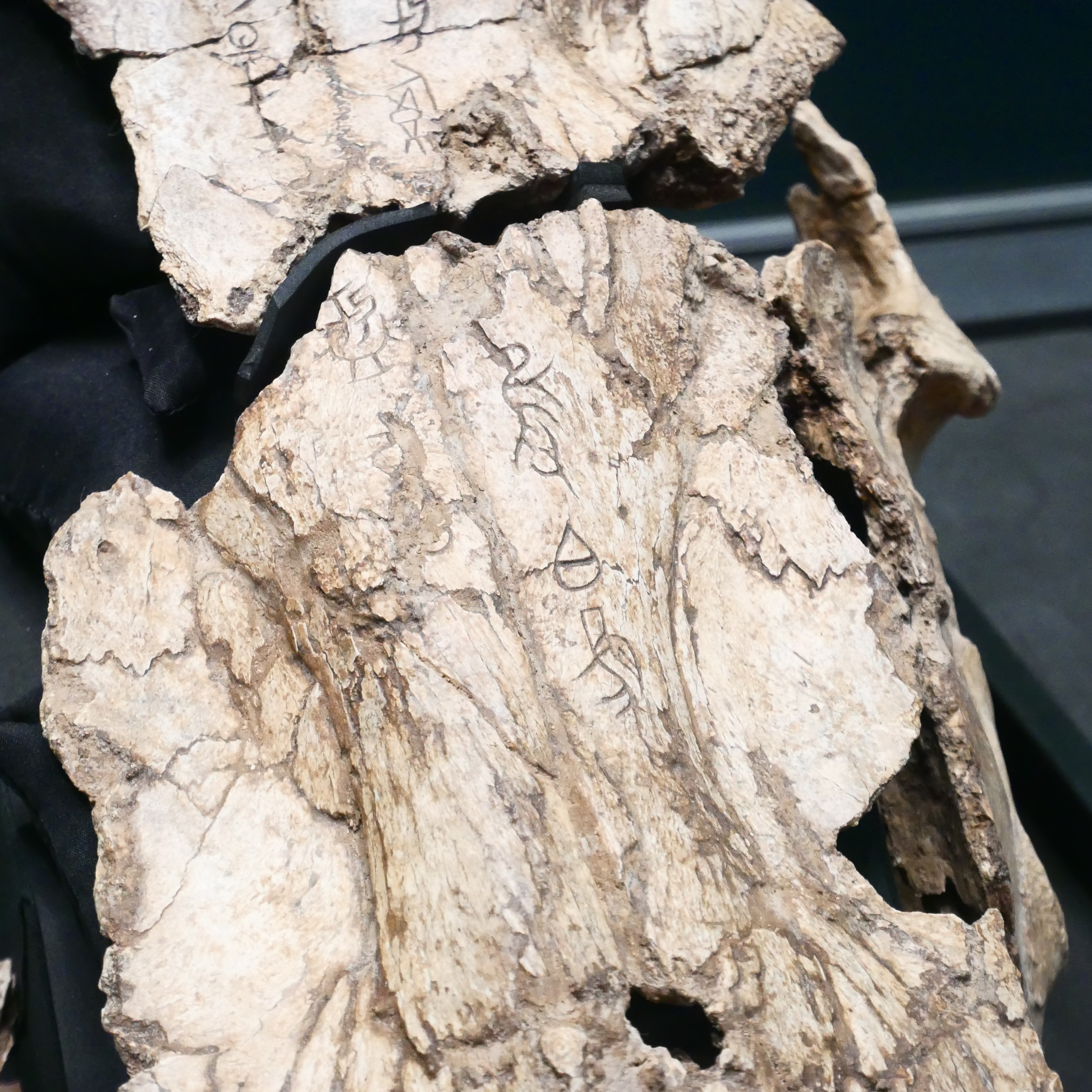
- Oracle bone describing Di Yi hunting a short-horned water buffalo.

King of Shang dynasty
- Reign: 1101–1076 BC
- Predecessor: Wen Ding
- Successor: Di Xin
- Died: 1076 BC
- Issue: Weizi of Song; Weizhong of Song; Di Xin
Names
- Family name: Zi (子); Given name: Xian (羨)
Temple name
- Di Yi (帝乙)
- Father: Wen Ding

Di Yi
- Chinese: 帝乙
- Literal meaning: "Thearch II"
Transcriptions
Standard Mandarin
- Hanyu Pinyin: dì yǐ
- Bopomofo: ㄉㄧˋ ㄧˇ
- Wade–Giles: ti^{4}-i^{3}
Middle Chinese
- Middle Chinese: tejH 'it
Old Chinese
- Baxter–Sagart (2014): /*tˁek-s qrət/

Di Yi (Chinese: 帝乙), personal name Zi Xian (Chinese: 子羨), was a king of the Shang dynasty from 1101 BC to 1076 BC. His capital was at Yin in modern-day Anyang, Henan, and his reign is preserved in oracle bone inscriptions and bronzeware.

== Personal life ==
Di Yi was the older brother of Jizi and Bi Gan. He would have three sons: Weiziqi (微子啟), Weizhong (微仲), and Di Xin. Sima Qian records that due to Weiziqi and Weizhong being of lower birth, Di Xin became his heir, and would be the last ruler of the Shang dynasty. After the fall of Shang, his son, Weiziqi was awarded the State of Song, and Weizhong succeeded him. His grandson, Wu Geng, would be enfeoffed in Bei during a partitioning of Yin.

== Reign ==
Di Yi's reign is marked by a significant war with the Yufang (盂方) to the west, started during his 9th year, led by Yan, the Earl of the Yufang (盂方伯炎). According to Ma Panpan (2022), it began with the Yufang attacking a western kingdom, or Shang from the west, depending on interpretation (西或, 西國), and encamping in Gao (高). Di Yi responded by ordering western tian (田) ministers to stage a counter-attack. During his 10th year, he hunted a short-horned water buffalo on the way back from one such excursion.

Sun (2023) notes that after the Yufang campaign, Di Yi spent around 5 months in Huo (霍), marked by divinations concerning his army's prospects. He would then move to Hedongzhao (河東兆) and campaign against the Yinmeifang (陰美方), (Note: The actual 陰 graph is ridiculous: 屵 + 酓 + 云) which would last from the 10th month of his 11th year until the 4th month of his 12th year.

In earlier oracle bone scholarship, Di Yi was thought to have campaigned against the Renfang 人方 during his 10th year. However, stylistic analysis has thrown this into question, particularly with the use of ziyong (兹御) "to be implemented" only appearing during Di Xin's reign, and usually appearing in instances of wars with the Renfang. In a significant thesis, Ma Panpan concluded that it is unlikely that Di Yi joined the war at all, crediting it with Di Xin.

== Posthumous accounts ==
Most posthumous accounts of Di Yi were written from the perspective of the invading Zhou dynasty and an anachronistic perspective of the Mandate of Heaven being lost by Di Xin; ergo, they should be treated with caution.

According to the Bamboo Annals, in the third year of his reign, Di Yi ordered Nanzhong (南仲) to fight Kun Barbarians and built Shuofang (朔方, roughly modern Ordos in Inner Mongolia) in the middle of Kun territory after winning a battle. An earthquake also struck Predynastic Zhou. He died in the ninth year of his reign.

In the Book of Changes, Di Yi is twice recorded as having given his younger sister to King Wen of Zhou in marriage under the Tai ䷊ and Gui Mei ䷵ hexagrams.

Sima Qian records that Di Yi's reign did not improve existing economic issues dating back to Wu Yi's reign. However, Duke Dan of Zhou was comparatively charitable during his speech against drunkenness in the Book of Documents, citing the Shang not being addicted to drink as an example of common virtue. A passage in the Zuozhuan implies that Di Yi lacked virtue in a similar fashion as to King Li of Zhou, though it is not elaborated upon. The Book of Han records Di Yi as being infatuated with a deity and having died of shock.

== Legacy ==
It is said that Di Yi is the origin of the surname hǎo 郝, citing a tale of Di Yi enfeoffing Haoxiang (郝乡, modern-day Taiyuan) to Zi Qi (子期), who then took the placename as their family name.

=== Sacrifices ===
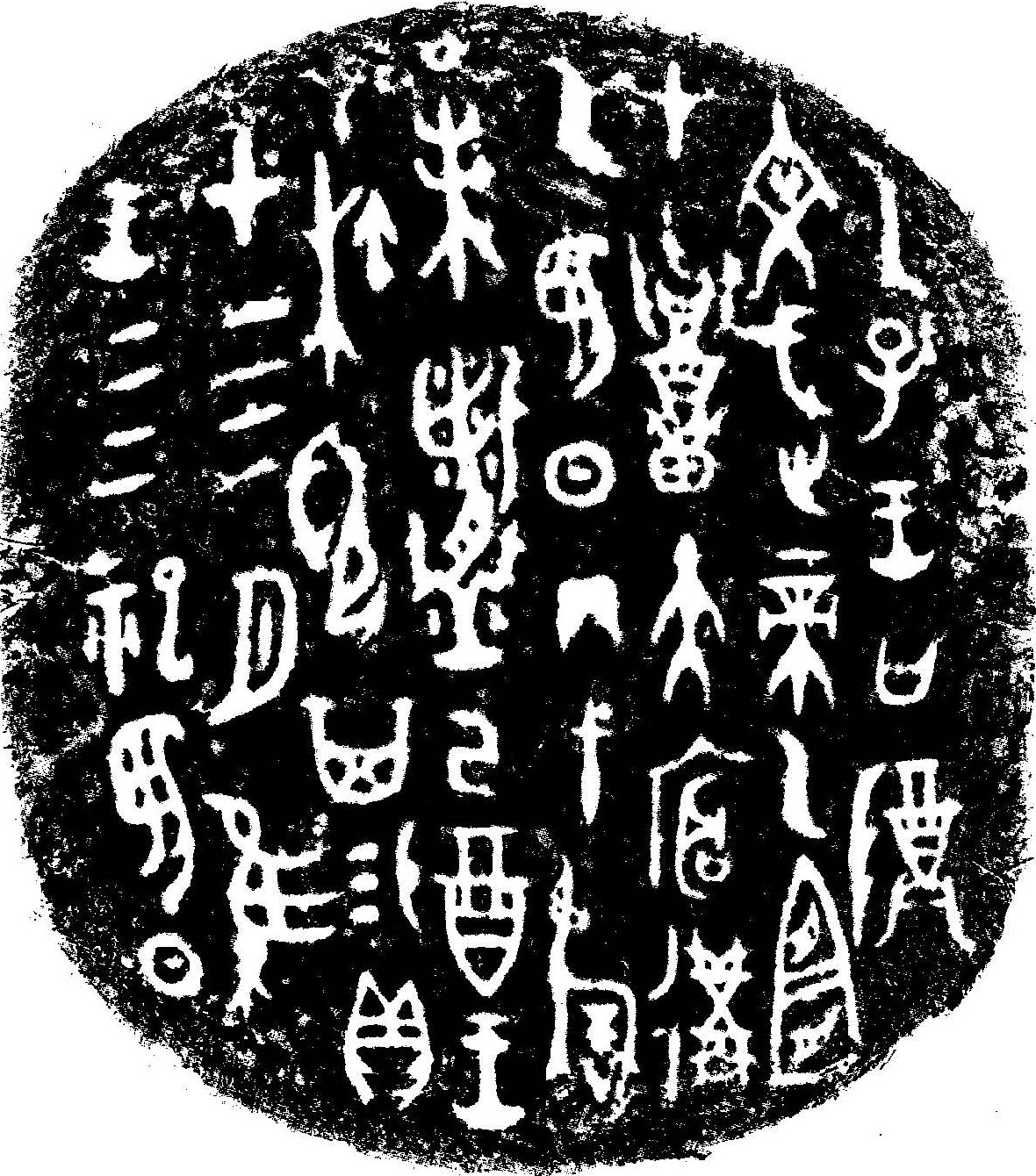
Bronzeware rubbing detailing a sacrifice made to Di Yi by Di Xin.

Di Yi is mentioned by name at least thrice in bronze inscriptions from Di Xin's reign, with the epithet "Civil and Military" 文武 attached each time. The first is from the 4th year of Di Xin's reign, where an yi sacrifice was performed to begin another ritual cycle; the second is a rong sacrifice from the 22nd year of his reign marking the end of another cycle. In this instance, Di Xin rewarded the individual assisting him with cowry money, who would then produce a vessel inscribing to the matter. Another sacrifice was made during his 4th ritual cycle where yi and zhu sacrifices were made, and an individual assisting Di Xin named Bi Qi (邲其) was rewarded with cowry money, and the act recorded in bronzeware (rubbing pictured).

== Notes ==
Di Yi Shang dynasty
Regnal titles
Preceded by Wen Wu Ding	King of China c. 1101 BC – c. 1076 BC	Succeeded by Di Xin
