= Shu Kang of Wey =

First ruler of Wey, ancient China

Shu Kang of Wey 衛康叔

Ruler of Wey
- Successor: Count Kang of Wey
- Issue: Count Kang of Wey
Names
- Ancestral name: Ji (姬); Given name: Feng (封)
Temple name
- Liezu (烈祖)
- House: House of Ji
- Father: King Wen of Zhou

Shu Kang of Wey (Chinese: 衛康叔; pinyin: Wèi Kāng Shū; lit. '[Royal] Uncle of Wey–Kang'), Shu Feng of Kang (Chinese: 康叔封; pinyin: Kāng Shū Fēng; lit. 'Feng', '[Royal] Uncle of Kang'), also known as given name Feng (封), Temple name Liezu (烈祖) was a Zhou dynasty feudal lord and the founder of the state of Wey. He was the ninth son of Ji Chang, King Wen of Zhou. Feng was also the full-brother of King Wu of Zhou, Duke of Zhou, Shu Zhenduo of Cao and Duke Gao of Bi.

== Life ==
Shu Feng was at first the lord of Kang (康). After the Rebellion of the Three Guards, Shu Feng received the capital city of Shang dynasty Zhaoge as his fief. This event marked the beginning of Wey's history.

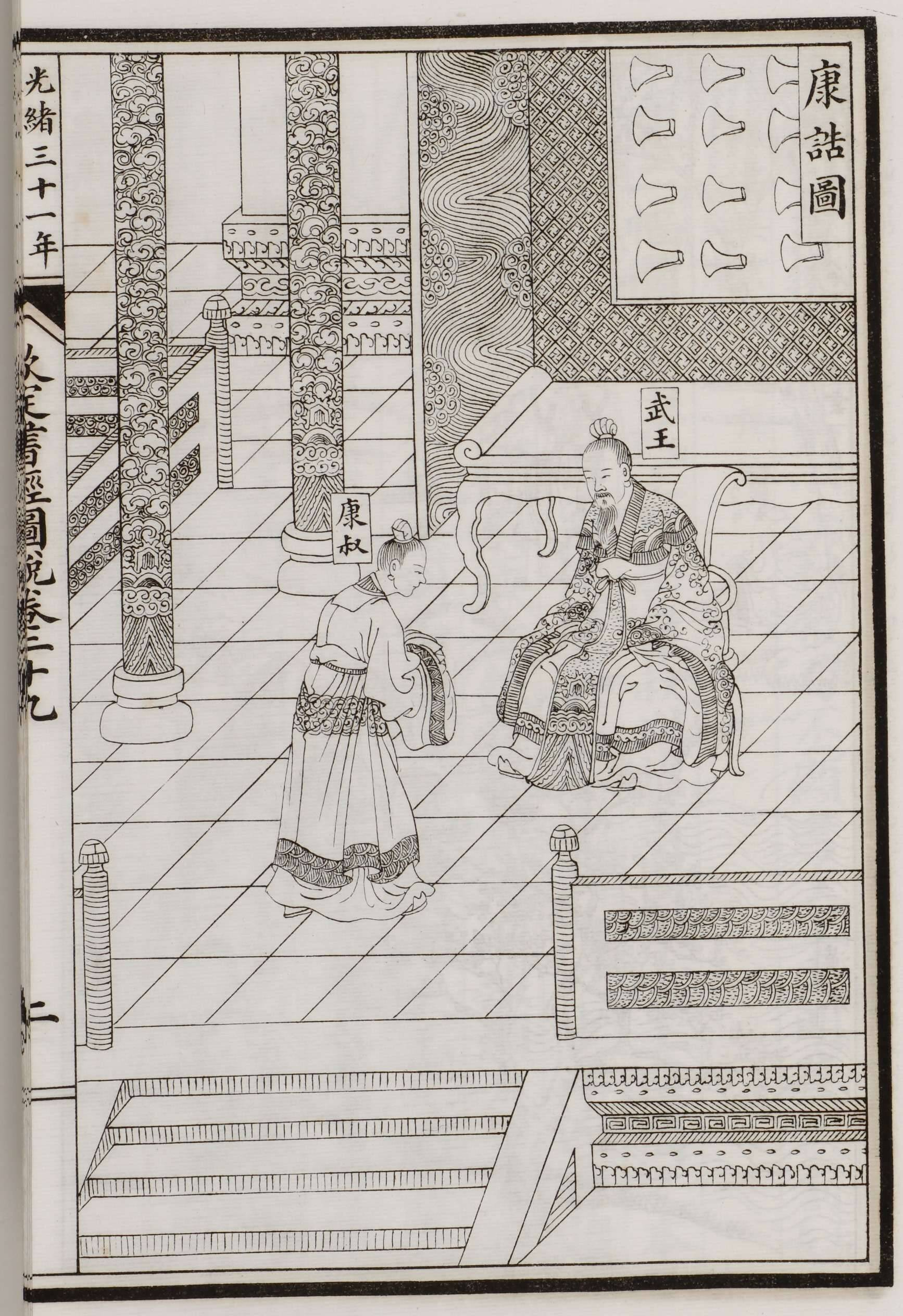
Duke of Zhou (right) and Shu of Wey–Kang

Before sending the royal uncle of Kang to Zhaoge, Duke of Zhou worried that the young brother of his might not be capable of handling a new environment. It is said that Duke of Zhou made three admonitions for Shu Feng to prevent him from any wrong-doing.

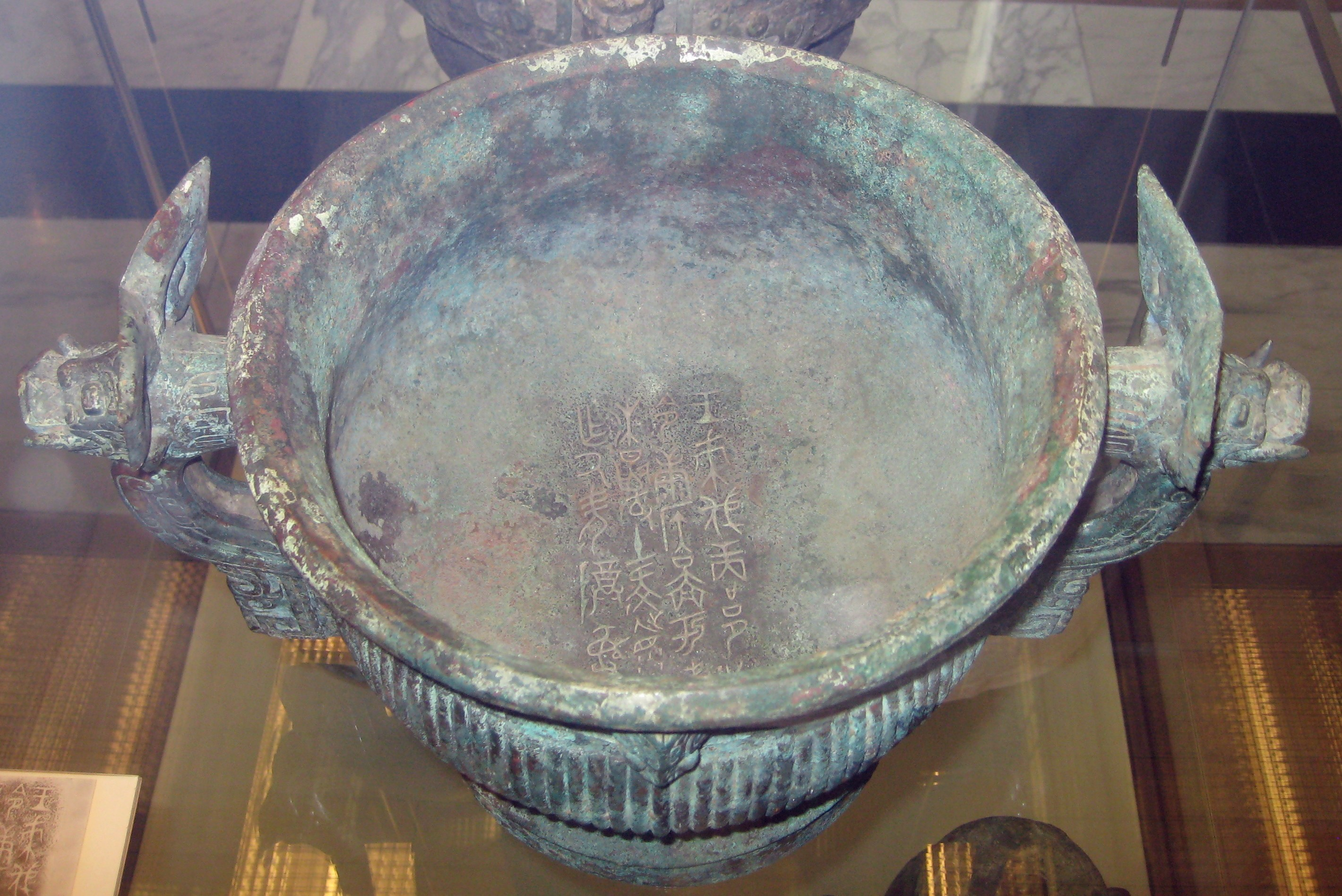
Bronze Vessel of Shu Feng, British Museum. 12th Century BCE-11 Century BCE

In 1931 CE, Shu Feng's bronze vessel Kang Hou Gui was unearthed. The vessel's inscription shows that Shu Feng was sent to Zhaoge with the purpose of pacifying the people of Shang after their defeated rebellion.

Shu Feng had a son named Mao (髦). Mao succeeded his title and was later known as Count Kang of Wey.

== Legacy ==
Shu Feng's state of Wey would outlive all other Chinese states during Zhou dynasty except for Qin, which unified China. Wey existed even after Qin's unification through the destruction of the six major states.

Shu Feng's shrine was located in Qi county, Henan province. It is currently abandoned.
