= Jiuhou Nü =

- Born: unknown
- Died: unknown
- Spouse: Di Xin
- Father: Jiuhou

Jiuhou Nü (Chinese: 九侯女; pinyin: Jiǔhóu Nǚ; lit. 'Daughter of Jiuhou'; c. ? — ?) was a consort of Di Xin during the Shang dynasty. She was of the Mi surname and came from the ruling family of Guifang, a region located in present-day northwestern Shaanxi, and western Inner Mongolia. Her father, Jiuhou, was a vassal ruler of the Shang dynasty and also the chief of Guifang.

== Historical accounts ==
According to the Shiji (史記; Records of the Grand Historian), Jiuhou Nü was offered to Di Xin as part of a marriage alliance between the Guifang and the Shang Dynasty. However, she was not favored by Di Xin and was subsequently executed on the false charge of 'not liking lust.' Her father, Jiuhou, was also executed by being chopped into pieces. The deaths of Jiuhou Nü and her father were major turning points in the history of the Shang dynasty. It is often cited as an example of Di Xin's cruelty and tyranny, leading to the alienation of the Guifang, who had been one of the Shang's most important allies. Additionally, it contributed to the growing resentment of Di Xin's rule, which eventually led to his overthrow.

There are different opinions on the cause of the death of Jiuhou Nü. The mainstream views are based on two accounts: one from the Records of the Grand Historian which states "Jiuhou Nü was not lewd", and the other from the Lüshi Chunqiu (呂氏春秋, The Annals of Lü Buwei) which records "Di Xin listened to the slander of Daji and executed Jiuhou Nü and her father".

According to Correction of Qianfu's Commentary (夫論箋校正), Marquess Jiuhou presented his daughter to Di Xin. The king was overjoyed and believed her to be the most beautiful woman in the world. He asked Daji for her opinion. Daji, fearing that the king would favor the new concubine and neglect her, feigned tears and exclaimed, "Your Majesty, are you losing your eyesight with age? How could you call such an ugly woman beautiful?" The king agreed with Daji's assessment that the Marquess's daughter was unattractive. Daji was also afraid that other marquesses and dukes would send their beautiful daughters to the king, so she told him, "Marquess Jiuhou is unrighteous. He wants to use his daughter to bewitch you. If you don't punish him, how can you deter others?". Di Xin was furious and had the Marquess's daughter boiled to death and fed to her father. Following this incident, all the beautiful women in the world remained secluded in their chambers during the day, fearing the king's attention.

Queen Jiang, a character and fictional queen consort of Di Xin from Fengshen Yanyi, a 16th-century Chinese novel, was believed to be based on the life of Jiuhou Nü.

The tomb of Jiuhou Nü is located in present-day Qixian County, Hebi City, Henan Province, along the banks of the Qi River.
