= Wen Wu Ding =

Wen Wu Ding 文武丁
- Reign: 1116–1106 BC or 1112–1102/1 BC
- Predecessor: Wu Yi
- Successor: Di Yi
- Died: 1106 BC or 1102/1 BC
- Issue: Di Yi; Bi Gan; Jizi

Wen Wu Ding (Chinese: 文武丁) or Wen Ding (文丁) or Tai Ding (太丁), personal name Zi Tuo (子托, Zǐ Tuō), was a king of the Shang dynasty of Ancient China. His reign was from 1116 to 1106 BC according to the Cambridge History of China or 1112 to 1102/1 BC according to the Xia–Shang–Zhou Chronology Project.

== Records ==
According to the Bamboo Annals, his capital was moved from Mou (沬) to Yin (殷).

In the second year of his reign, his vassal Jili of Zhou attacked the Yanjing Rong (燕京戎), but they defeated him.

During his third year, the Huan River (洹水) dried up.

In his fourth year, Jili attacked the Yuwu Rong (余无戎) and was victorious, making Yuwu into a Zhou client.

In his fifth year, Jili established Chengyi (程邑) in the lands he had previously annexed from Cheng.

In his seventh year, Jili attacked the Shihu Rong (始呼之戎) and was again victorious.

Several years later, Jili defeated the Xitu Rong (翳徒戎) and captured three of their generals. Worried that Zhou was growing too powerful, Wen Ding sent Jili to a rural storehouse and had him starved to death there.

Wen Wu Ding Shang dynasty
Regnal titles
Preceded by Wu Yi (ruler)	King of China c. 1116 BC – c. 1106 BC	Succeeded by Di Yi
