= Bei (state) =

Ancient Chinese state

邶
- c. 1,046 BCE
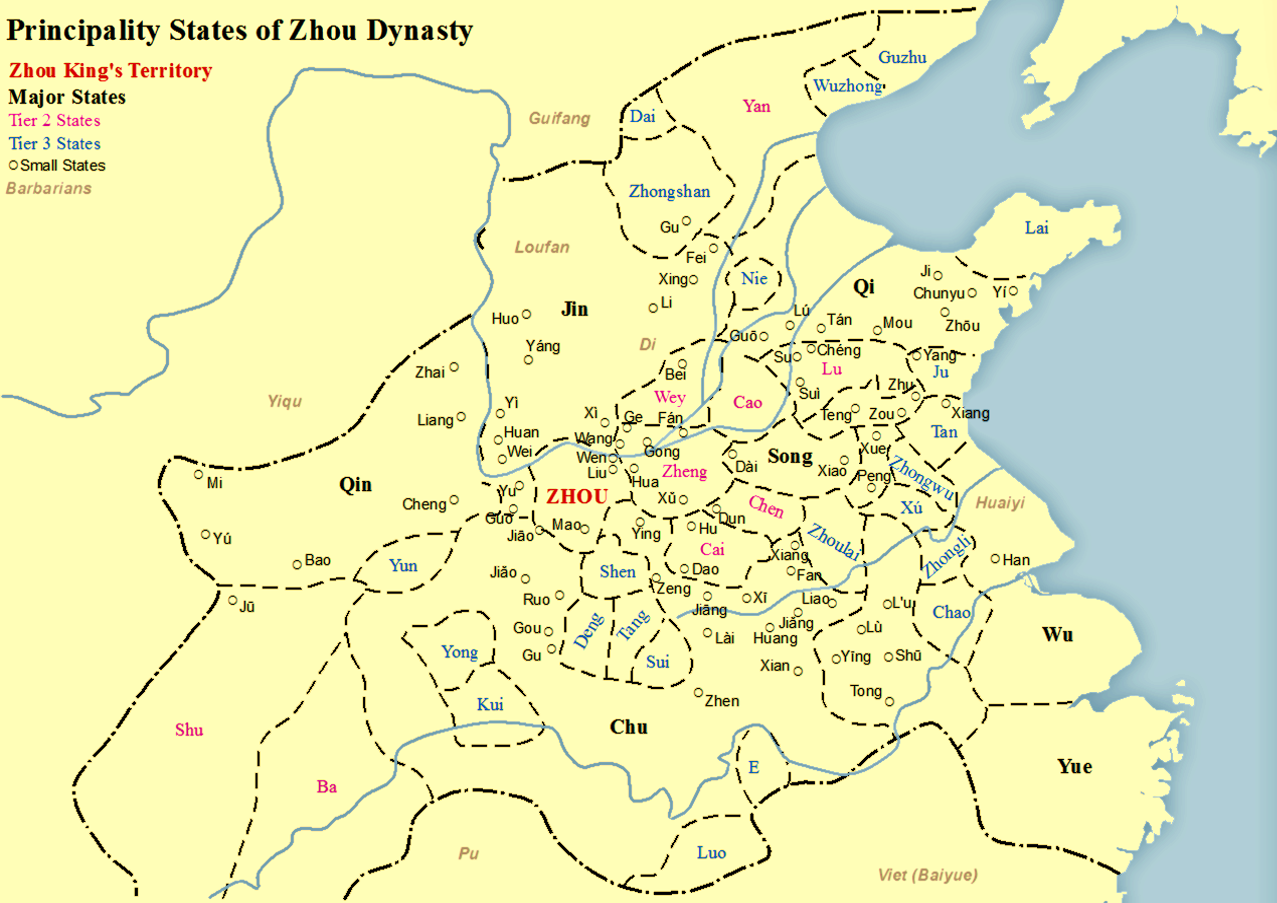
- Map of China during the Zhou dynasty
- Government: Fiefdom
- Ruler
  - c. 1,046 BCE: Wu Geng
- History
  - Established: c. 1,046 BCE
  - Battle of Muye: c. 1,046 BCE
  - Rebellion of the Three Guards: c. 1,042 BCE
  - Execution of Wu Geng: c. 1,039 BCE
- Today part of: Yinxu, Henan

Bei
- Bei (邶) in Seal script.
- Chinese: 邶
Transcriptions
Standard Mandarin
- Hanyu Pinyin: bèi
- Wade–Giles: pei^{4}
Yue: Cantonese
- Jyutping: bui^{3}
Middle Chinese
- Middle Chinese: bwojH
Old Chinese
- Zhengzhang: /*bɯːɡs/

Bei (Chinese: 邶國; pinyin: bèiguó) was a vassal state of Zhou in the early Zhou dynasty, located in the southeast of Tangyin County, modern-day Henan Province.

== History ==
The Book of Han records Bei as a successor state to Yin, having been destroyed by the invading Predynastic Zhou during the Battle of Muye that dethroned Di Xin. Among three, the other states were Yong (庸) and Wei. Wu Geng, Di Xin's son, was enfeoffed in Bei. Xu Shen records in Shuowen Jiezi that it was located north of Zhaoge, thus the name.

During the second year of the reign of King Cheng of Zhou with the Duke of Zhou as regent, the people of Yan and Xu, and the Huaiyi, entered Bei to rebel as part of the Rebellion of the Three Guards. The rebellion would be quashed by the Duke of Zhou within three years.

Copy of The Sun and Moon (日月) from the Bei feng (邶風) written in stone. Sichuan Museum.

Bei is among several Zhou states to have sections delineated in the Classic of Poetry, featuring 19 poems. After the Rebellion of the Three Guards, the people of Bei and Yong were forcibly moved to Luoyi (洛邑), and the state was dismantled. Ban Gu observes this event in the Book of Han as a reason why the poetry between the three states was seen as similar. One poem, Ji Gu (擊鼓), describes people having followed an individual named Sunzi Zhong (孙子仲) and having peace made with the states of Chen and Song. The identification of Sunzi Zhong, however, is uncertain; taken literally, he could be the younger brother of a grandson. Mao Heng, an early annotator of the compilation, identified him as a high-ranking military officer named Gongsun Wenzhong (公孙文仲). Qing dynasty scholar Yao Jiheng (姚际恆), in their Ordinary Discussions of the Odes (詩經通論), believed it to be a differing account of a war described in the Zuo Zhuan. This is seen as a more plausible interpretation; however, both interpretations would date the poem to several hundred years after Bei had already collapsed.

== See also ==
- Wu Geng
- Rebellion of the Three Guards
