= Di Xin =

Last king of the Shang dynasty

Di Xin 帝辛
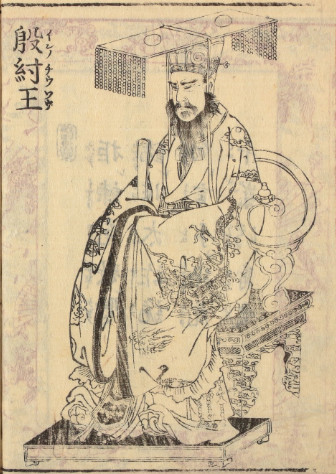
- Di Xin as illustrated in the Ehon Sangoku Yōfuden (c. 1805)

King of Shang dynasty
- Reign: 1075–1046 BCE (29 years)
- Predecessor: Di Yi (Father)
- Born: 1105 BCE
- Died: 1046 BCE
- Spouse: Consort Daji; Jiuhou Nü
- Issue: Wu Geng
Names
- Family name: Zǐ (子); Clan name: Yīn (殷) or Shāng (商); Given name: Shòu (受) or Shòudé (受德)
Posthumous name
- Zhòu (紂, Zhou dynasty pejorative)
Temple name
- Dì Xīn (帝辛)
- Father: Di Yi
- Military career
- Allegiance: Shang dynasty
- Conflicts: Battle of Muye †

Di Xin
- Chinese: 帝辛
- Literal meaning: "Thearch VIII"
Transcriptions
Standard Mandarin
- Hanyu Pinyin: dì xīn
- Bopomofo: ㄉㄧˋ ㄒㄧㄣ
- Wade–Giles: ti^{4}-hsin^{1}
Middle Chinese
- Middle Chinese: tejH sin
Old Chinese
- Baxter–Sagart (2014): /*tˁek-s [s]i[n]/

Alternative Chinese name
- Chinese: 商紂王
- Literal meaning: "Zhou of Shang"
Transcriptions
Standard Mandarin
- Hanyu Pinyin: shāng zhòu wáng
- Bopomofo: ㄕㄤ ㄓㄡˋ ㄨㄤˊ
- Wade–Giles: shang^{4}-chou^{4}-wang^{2}
Middle Chinese
- Middle Chinese: syang drjuwX hjwang
Old Chinese
- Baxter–Sagart (2014): /*s-taŋ [d]ruʔ ɢʷaŋ/

Di Xin of Shang (Chinese: 商帝辛; pinyin: Shāng Dì Xīn; Wade–Giles: Shang Ti-Hsin) or Shou, King of Shang (Chinese: 商王受; pinyin: Shāng Wáng Shòu; Wade–Giles: Shang Wang Shou), was the last king of the Shang dynasty of ancient China. He is also known by a pejorative title, King Zhou of Shang ([ʈ͡ʂoʊ˥˩]; Chinese: 商紂王; pinyin: Shāng Zhòu Wáng; Wade–Giles: Shang Chou-Wang) in Zhou dynasty texts and beyond. He is contemporaneously recorded in bronze relics, where his temple name, Di Xin, is used, and posthumously in the Chinese classics by his pejorative title of "King Zhou."

In later times, the story of “King Zhou” became a cautionary tale on what could befall a kingdom if its ruler gave into corruption and moral depravity. However, owing to the small number of artifacts found from his rule, his actual life and deeds are not well understood beyond posthumous accounts.

== Names ==
"Di Xin" (帝辛) is the official title given by the Shang dynasty imperial house, formatted in a similar way to Emperor Shun and Emperor Yao with the thearch title di 帝 placed before his name. This stands in contrast to later emperors, who would have it placed after.

Di Xin was born with the family name Zi, lineage name Yin, and the given name Shou. He was called Shou, King of Shang 商受王 by the Zhou when he was alive.

After Di Xin had allegedly killed himself at Deer Terrace Pavilion he was given a derogatory posthumous name, King Zhou of Shang (商紂王), with Zhou (紂) meaning "horse crupper", implying "injustice and harm". It is also the part of a saddle or harness that is most likely to be soiled by the horse, and an area most likely to be whipped. However, Sima Qian claims that everyone in the empire had dubbed Di Xin this due to a tyrannical reign.

This title Zhòu 紂 and the enemy Zhōu 周 Dynasty are only pronounced similarly today in Modern Standard Mandarin Chinese. Proceeding from the Baxter–Sagart reconstruction of Old Chinese, which would have been spoken at the time, to Baxter's transcription for Middle Chinese, to the modern-day pronunciation in Pinyin would be as follows:

- 紂: /*[d]ruʔ/ → drjuwX → zhòu
- 周: /*tiw/ → tsyuw → zhōu

Di Xin is occasionally called Zhòu Xīn (紂辛), merging his Shang and Zhou names.

Centuries after his death, the name "King Zhou of Shang" had become shorthand for an archetype of wicked rule.

== Early life ==
Di Xin was the younger of three sons to Di Yi, his brothers named Zi Qi (子啓) and Zi Yan (子衍). As Qi’s mother was of low birth, whereas Di Xin’s was the principal consort, he was made the heir and ascended the throne after Di Yi passed away. Di Xin had two uncles, Ji Zi and Bi Gan. He bore a single son named Wu Geng.

Outside of family, little is known of Di Xin’s early life outside of posthumous accounts. In Chapter 15 of Xunzi, Di Xin is recorded as having been tall, mighty, and intelligent, even from a young age, able to defeat a hundred men on his own. Sima Qian notes that Di Xin was cunning and able to talk his way out of trouble, and would boast of his abilities being above all others, even his own ministers. He was also said to be able to fight beasts with his bare hands. Di Xin's strength is recorded in 甲3939, where he is recorded as having hunted a white Sumatran rhinoceros or Short-horned water buffalo during the 10th year of his reign.

== Reign ==
After succeeding the throne, Di Xin changed the Shang capital to Mo 沬邑, then changed the name to Zhaoge 朝歌, in modern-day Qi County, Hebi in Henan. Di Xin is known for his wars with the Renfang, (Note: Called the Dongyi in posthumous accounts, also written as Yifang 夷方) Linfang 林方, and Hufang 虎方. The Hufang were particularly regarded as being "rebellious" 反 in bronze inscriptions. These wars are recorded as having been particularly costly to the Shang dynasty in posthumous accounts and were seen as the main reason for its downfall.

To the horror of the Zhou people, Di Xin was known to employ fugitives in his governmental offices based on merit. This method was found to suppress the clans who held too much power in court. Additionally, he was known to appoint women to positions as well, a trend that would evaporate after his reign. Women were responsible for managing rituals, advising military affairs, managing court and guests, and they were highly respected by the Shang state, which was observed even during the Zhou-Qin classical period. The appointment of women to power during the Shang dynasty indicates a culture with high levels of gender equality, while the Zhou state, which was developing Confucian rituals at the time, was more patriarchal.

=== Participation in the Shang state religion ===
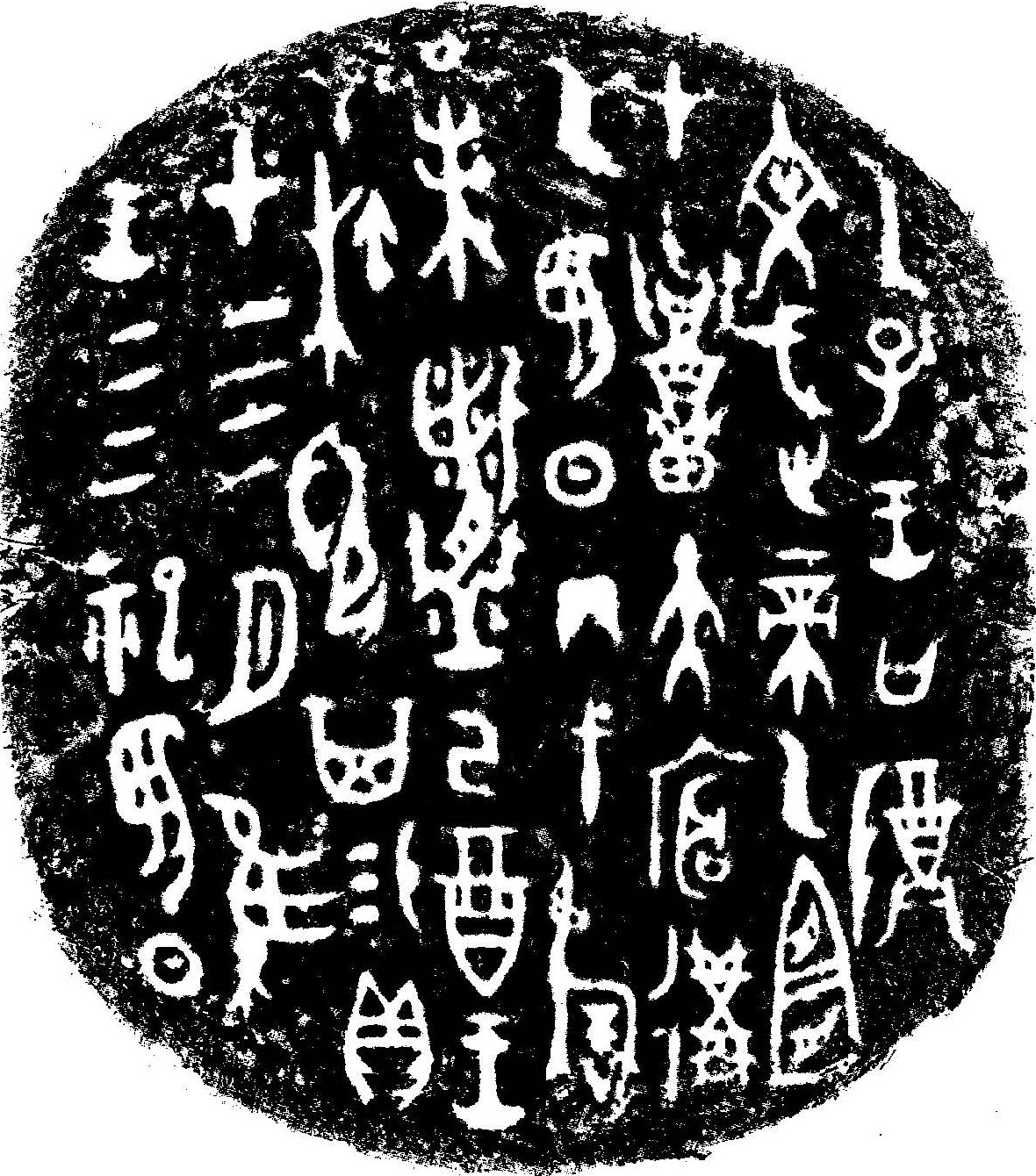
Bronzeware rubbing detailing a sacrifice made to Di Yi by Di Xin.

In contemporary records, as is the role of the Shang king, Di Xin is recorded as having upheld Shang dynasty religion in several bronze and oracle bone inscriptions, where he participates in feng 豊, the Shang dynasty concept of ritual communion with ancestors. This implies a trend of reduction in human sacrifice compared to previous rulers; likewise, after Di Xin's reign ended, ritual sacrifice increased in the Zhou dynasty.

The diviners that worked with Di Xin are small in number, comprising the Huang (黃) group of Period V in oracle bone divination. Of these, Yong (永) and Huang (黃) were the most prolific, the former being a veteran of Di Yi's reign and the latter a new arrival who specifically divinated about campaigns against the Renfang (人方).

In the fourth year of his reign, he performed an yi sacrifice on an Yisi day dedicated to his father Di Yi, signalling the start of another ritual cycle. This was actualised with a zhu sacrifice being made later, to which an individual named Bi Qi 邲其 was rewarded with cowry money. This activity would continue at least into his 22nd year, having performed a rong ritual for his father, signalling the end of a cycle. He rewarded the minister assisting him with cowry money 貝, which was spent on a bronze vessel.

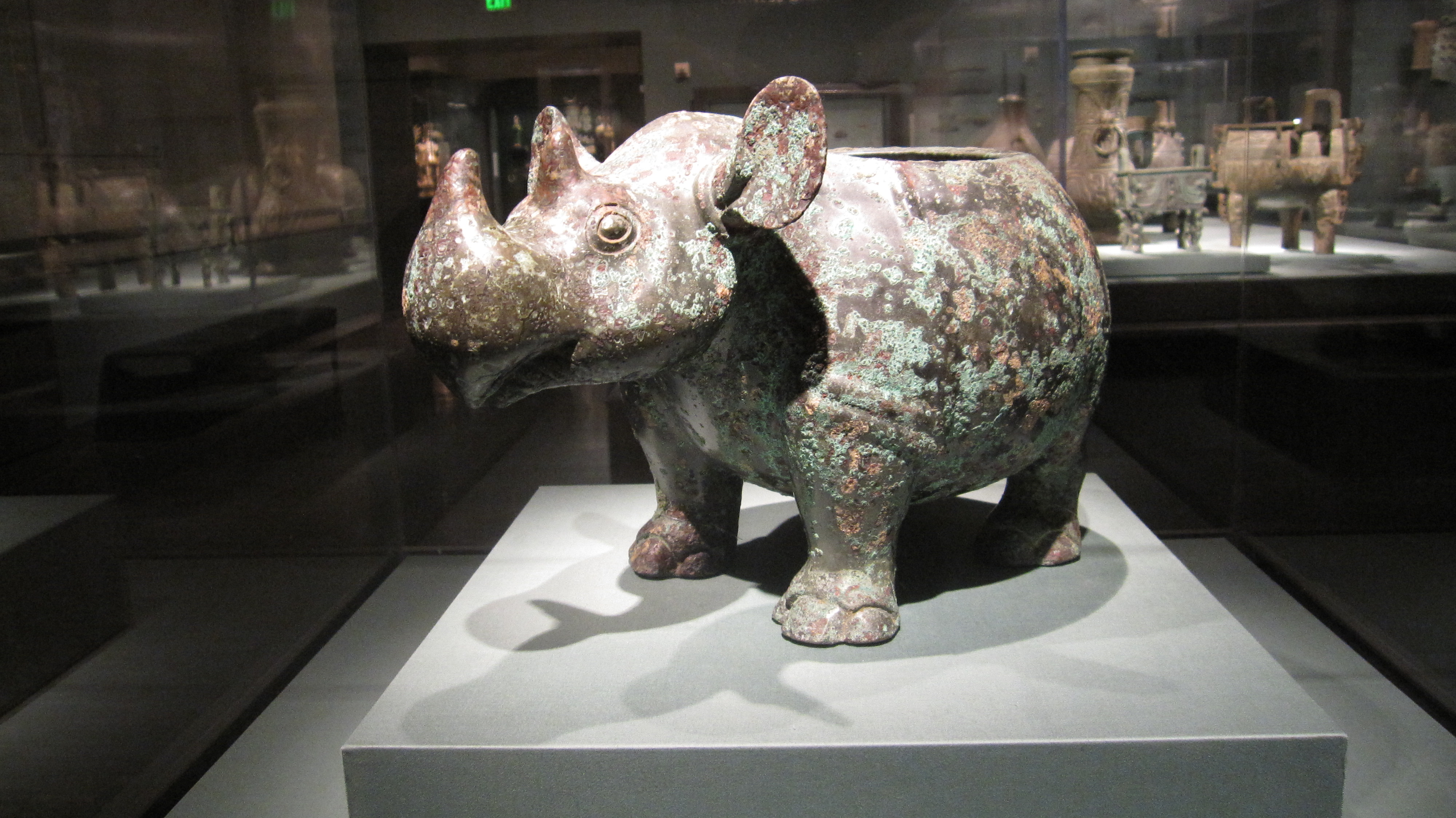
Zun inscribed with the record of Xiaochen Yu 小臣艅.

During his 15th year on a Disi day of Rong sacrifice, Di Xin is recorded as having inspected Kuai during his war with the Renfang. He rewarded an individual named Yu, a Xiaochen minister, 小臣艅 with cowry money, who would then make a bronze zun imaged after a Sumatran rhinoceros.

=== Concubines ===
Di Xin had several concubines, of whom two are named, though contemporary sources are scarce. His favourite was allegedly Daji, who is described as a temptress who manipulated him into committing torturous acts, from which the two garnered pleasure. His second concubine, who lacks a definitive name, was a daughter of Lord Jiu 九侯女. She was presented to Di Xin by a ruler from the Guifang, who had become allies with the Shang after a three-year war. However, she was allegedly killed due to her disliking lust ("不喜淫"), and her father was killed after. However, conflicting accounts claim that Daji called her ugly and feared that Di Xin would no longer pay attention to her, convincing him to kill her. Her tomb is located in Qixian County, Hebi in Henan.

=== Renfang campaign ===
Di Xin's reign is marked by a significant military campaign in the east against Dongyi states, referred to by the Shang as the Renfang (人方). In a large-scale study of oracle bones, Ma Panpan concludes that a ruler, either Di Yi or Di Xin, but likely Di Xin, prognosticated as to whether to join the war during a sacrifice to Shang Jia, believed it to be auspicious, and chose to proceed. The campaign went on for a considerable period of time and posthumous Zhou dynasty accounts record it as being particularly costly to the Late Shang state. Huang, one of Di Xin's diviners, charged as to whether Di Xin would see misfortune during sequential 10-day periods.

癸亥。卜。黃貞：王旬亡憂。在九月。征人方，在雇彝。
On the guihai day, scapulimancy was performed. Huang charges: "During the [coming] ten-day period, will the king have no misfortune?" It was in the ninth month, during the campaign against Renfang, at Guyi.

Yong would make similar prognostications, sometimes daily, during the campaign, as Di Xin moved to various places. Later, Shang forces moved to Qian (潛) and a divination was performed. 10 days later, on a guimao day, the king had moved into the Yong frontier (鄙永) in the State of You, controlled by Marquess Xi of You (攸侯喜), It appears that Di Xin spent considerable time in the State of You in particular.

== Battle of Muye and death ==
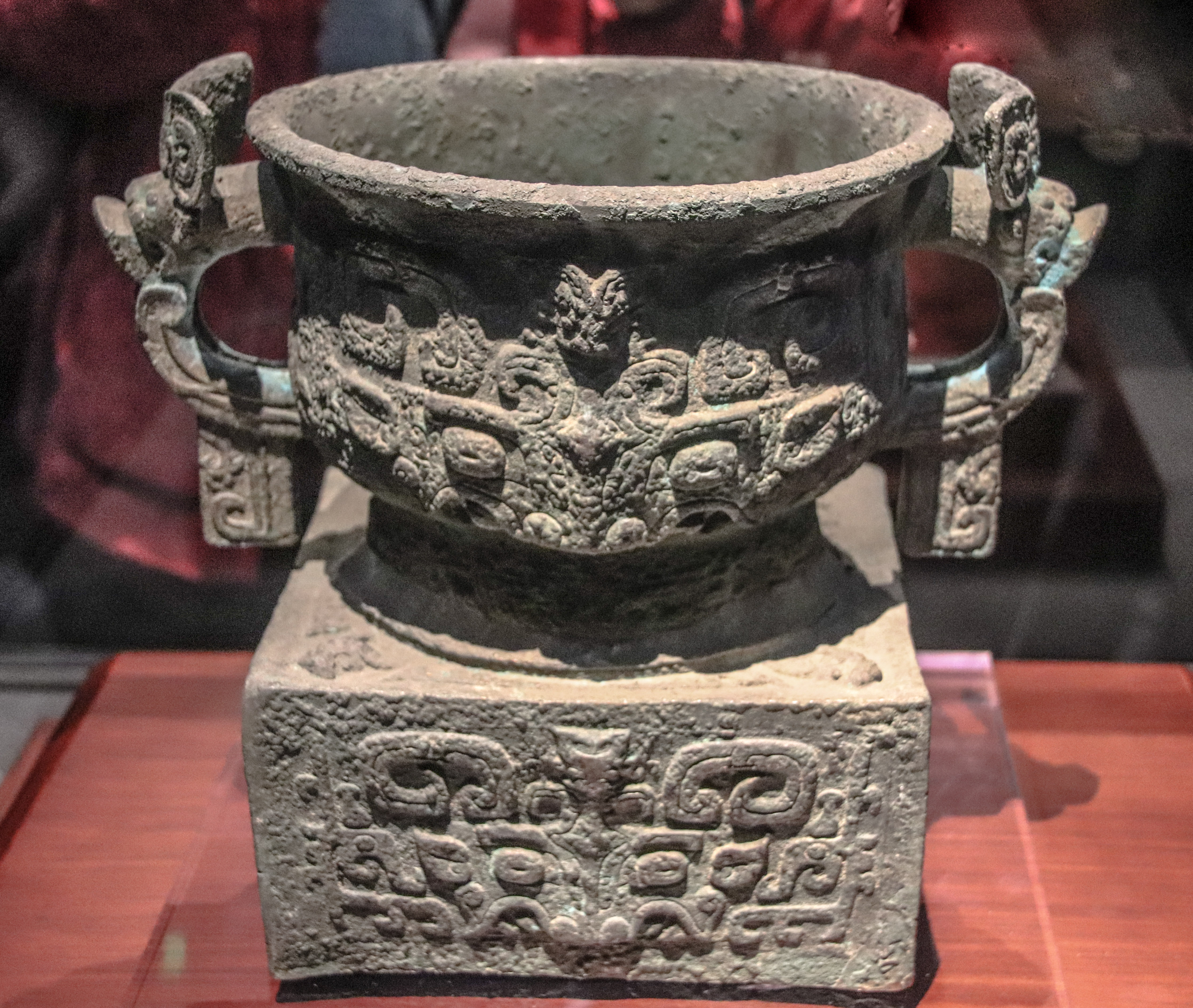
The Li gui, a crucial artifact for dating the Battle of Muye.

In c. 1046 BC, the army of Ji Fa of Zhou, invaded with 45,000 troops led by Jiang Ziya, compared to the Shang's 170,000. Despite this, due to having been occupied with fighting the Renfang, they had caught the Shang unaware whilst troop morale was low. This led to a surprise defeat. The battle is recorded on the Li gui, the only contemporary epigraphic evidence of its occurrence.

The Lost Book of Zhou records the battle as having been particularly brutal, with the Shang people being slaughtered. Records of the Grand Historian records Ji Fa, King Wu of Zhou making a decisive charge whilst flanked by Ji Dan, Duke of Zhou and the Duke of Shao, which led to their victory.

When his loss at the Battle of Muye was clear, Di Xin is alleged to have gathered up his treasures, dressed in his finest wear, ran to Deer Terrace Pavilion, and committed self-immolation. Thereafter, he was beheaded and had his head hung on a white-flag pole by Ji Fa. Ji Fa then killed consort Daji, freed Jizi, paid respects to Bi Gan, and honoured the neighbourhood of Shang Rong with a plaque. However, the Yi Zhou Shu notes that Di Xin was murdered with an axe by Ji Fa amid the massacre of Shang civilians.

=== Proposed tomb ===
Di Xin's tomb is thought to be No. 1567 in Yinxu, but his body was not found inside, and the tomb itself was empty. Additionally, it lacks the structures seen with other Shang royal tombs despite being in the same royal Whether he was buried there or it was desecrated by the Zhou is unclear. Because Shang royal tombs were repeatedly and persistently looted in antiquity, it is near-impossible to test the hypothesis beyond process of elimination. Uchida and Mizoguchi argue that Di Xin never had a tomb, and that it is more likely to have belonged to Di Yi.

=== Aftermath ===
After the annexation of Shang, his son, Wu Geng, would rule Yin, which had been partitioned into the State of Bei. However, King Wu of Zhou would die 3 years into his reign, leaving his son, King Cheng of Zhou, to rule as a child. Ji Dan, the Duke of Zhou, would rule as regent for a time, which led to a succession crisis, with the Shang people believing Wu Geng should rule instead. This culminated in the Rebellion of the Three Guards, where several of King Wu's brothers rebelled alongside him. The Duke of Zhou decisively crushed the rebellion within 3 years, and installed Ji Feng (姬封, Kang Shu 康叔) to manage their forces, and wrote treatises on how to handle the conquered people. The Shang would not rise again after this, and Di Xin’s brothers Zi Qi and Zi Yan would successively rule the vassal state Song in the burgeoning Zhou dynasty.

== Criticism in posthumous accounts ==
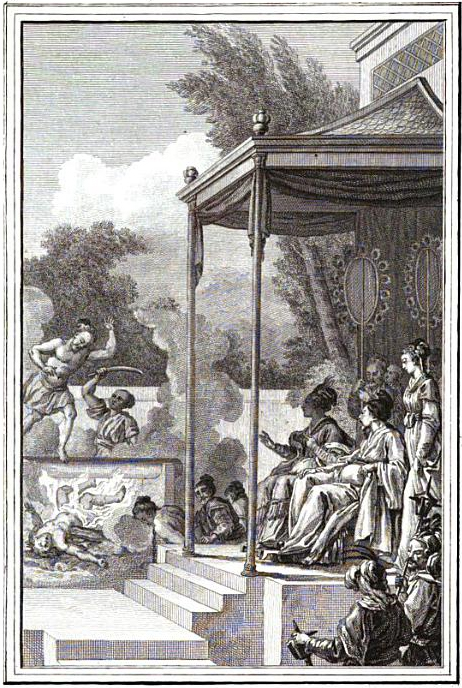
1788 depiction of Di Xin and Daji observing the burning of a person.

Traditional Chinese historiography, built on Records of the Grand Historian and the Chinese classics, views Di Xin as a tyrannical ruler driven by lust, desire, and sadism. He is accused of having lost the Mandate of Heaven through his inability to rule the Shang dynasty, bringing its continued decline to a head and forcing the hand of Predynastic Zhou to rectify the problem. He is therefore called "King Zhou of Shang" (商紂王, lit. "King Horse Crupper of Shang") as a pejorative posthumous name instead of his temple name, Di Xin, which became the traditional way to name him.

=== Debate on authenticity ===
The narrative of "King Zhou" comes from the perspective of the conquering Zhou dynasty, and some aspects are reproduced from lost documents. Over the centuries since the Battle of Muye, the allegations made against Di Xin worsened over time. In the beginning, Di Xin was seen as an inept ruler; come the Han dynasty, he is depicted as a tyrant who tortured dissidents and engaged in wanton lust. Therefore, the authenticity of the allegations made is considered debatable.

Suspicions of the Zhou dynasty view of Di Xin can be seen rearing up during the Warring States period in the Analects. Duanmu Ci (courtesy name Zigong), using the Zhou exonym, states thusly:

子貢曰：「紂之不善，不如是之甚也。是以君子惡居下流，天下之惡皆歸焉。」

Zi Gong said, "Zhou's wickedness was not so great as that name implies. Therefore, the superior man hates to dwell in a low-lying situation, where all the evil of the world will flow in upon him."

During the Southern Song dynasty, scholar Luo Mi wrote in the Lushi that he also considered the allegations against Di Xin to be largely unreliable and exaggerated after reviewing various documents:

大抵書傳所記桀紂之事多出模倣。如世紀等倒拽九牛、撫梁易柱、引鈎申索、握鐡流湯、傾宮瑤室、與夫璿臺三里、金柱三千、車行酒、騎行炙、酒池糟丘、脯林肉圃、宮中九市、牛飲三千、丘鳴鬼哭、山走石泣、兩日並出、以人食獸、六月獵西山、以百二十日為夜等事。紂為如是，而謂桀亦如是，是豈其俱然哉？

"Generally speaking, the affairs of Jie and Di Xin (Note: Di Xin is referred to here as King Zhou 紂, his pejorative posthumous name) recorded in books and traditions mostly arise from imitation. For example, in works like Records of the Grand Historian, there are stories of dragging nine bulls backward, bracing beams and swapping pillars, stretching bronze hooks, grasping hot iron and flowing hot water, leaning palaces and jasper chambers, along with a jade tower three li around, three thousand golden pillars, carts that travel through wine, riders that travel over roast meat, pools of wine and mounds of lees, forests of dried meat and gardens of flesh, nine markets inside the palace, three thousand drinking like cattle, mounds that wail and ghosts that cry, mountains that run and stones that weep, two suns rising together, humans eating beasts, hunting on West Mountain in the sixth month, and making one hundred and twenty days into a single night. If Di Xin is said to have done these things, and Jie is also said to have done the same, how could it be that both were truly like this?"

Gu Jiegang and other Doubting Antiquity School historians noted that the further into later periods sources were, the more detailed and numerous the accusations against Di Xin became. Most notably, the concept of the Mandate of Heaven 天命 as mentioned in these posthumous texts is a subject of considerable debate. Some scholars, like Chao Fulin, argue that the Shang dynasty did not possess the later concept of the 'Mandate of Heaven', which dictates the rise and fall of dynasties. In the 'Book of Shang,' for example, the term 'Mandate of Heaven' actually refers to 'the command of the ancestors' (the spiritual power of the ancestors in heaven to bless or abandon one's life).

=== Charges from the Zhou ===
The apocryphal (Note: Now thought to have been written during the Eastern Jin period by Mei Ze (梅賾)) "Great Declaration" in the Book of Documents raises six charges against Di Xin: Not paying reverence to heaven, committing calamities against those below him, abandoning himself to drink and lust, extending punishments to relatives, nepotism via hereditary receipt, killing pregnant women, and building excessive royal quarters (e.g. Palaces, gardens, pavilions). Similar ideas would be repeated in Records of the Grand Historian, Lushi Chunqiu, and other works. According to Sima Qian, he even hosted festive orgies, where many people engaged in immoral things at the same time with his concubines and created songs with crude, erotic lyrics and poor rhythm. In legends, he is depicted as having come under the influence of his wicked wife Daji, and committing all manner of evil and cruel deeds with her. However, contemporary records such as bronze vessels and oracle bone inscriptions contradict this characterisation, with him being seemingly consistent in his observance of the religion of the Shang dynasty and ancestral rites.

=== Lake of Wine and Forest of Meat ===
One of the most famous forms of entertainment Di Xin enjoyed, noted in Shuo Yuan, was the "Lake of Wine and Forest of Meat" (酒池肉林) built at the Deer Terrace Pavilion. A large pool, big enough for several canoes, was constructed with inner linings of polished oval-shaped stones from the seashore. This allowed for the entire pool to be filled with wine. A small island was constructed in the middle of the pool, where trees were planted, which had branches made of roasted meat skewers hanging over the pool. This allowed Di Xin and his friends and concubines to drift on canoes in the pool. When they thirsted, they reached down into the pool with their hands and drank the wine. When they hungered, they reached up with their hands to eat the roasted meat. The narrative of the "Lake of Wine and Forest of Meat" was questioned as early as the Han dynasty. Scholar Wang Chong, in his work Lunheng, suggested the accounts of "wine pools and meat forests" were unreliable.

A large, stone, artificial pool thought to be the pool at the Deer Terrace Pavilion was unearthed in Yanshi, Henan in 1999. As water wells were found nearby, the researchers concluded that it was not designed to provide groundwater to individuals, but whether it was used for recreation, aesthetic, or ritual use is unclear.

=== Torture accusations ===
Sima Qian records that in order to please Daji, Di Xin created the "Punishment of burning flesh with a hot iron (炮格之刑)". This claim is repeated in the Bamboo Annals. One large hollow bronze cylinder was stuffed with burning charcoal and allowed to burn until red-hot; then prisoners were made to hug the cylinder, which resulted in a painful and unsightly death. Di Xin and Daji were said to become highly aroused after watching such torture. Victims ranged from ordinary people and prisoners to high government officials, such as Mei Bo. Despite this, no tomb of Daji, nor evidence of Daji's existence, has materialised in the excavation of Yin.

=== Killing of Bi Gan ===
In order to fund Di Xin's heavy daily expenses, heavy taxes were implemented. The people suffered greatly, and lost all hope for the Shang dynasty. His brother Wei Zi tried to persuade him to change, but was rebuked. His uncle Bi Gan similarly pleaded with him, but Di Xin had his heart ripped out so he could see what the heart of a sage looked like. When his other uncle Jizi heard this, he went to plead with the kingly nephew and, feigning madness, was imprisoned. This narrative is recorded in texts such as Records of the Grand Historian.

However, the Xia–Shang–Zhou Chronology Project and other studies have pointed out inconsistencies in this account. Bi Gan's death due to his confrontation with his nephew is recorded in the Spring and Autumn period, while the account of his heart being removed by Di Xin appeared much later in the fables of the Warring States period, indicating that extra details were likely added to these accounts reinforce Di Xin's tyrannical image. It is not reflected in oracle bone evidence.

=== Killing of Bo Yikao ===
In the 9th Century Record of Emperors and Kings (帝王世紀), it is said that Di Xin put Bo Yikao, King Wu of Zhou's brother, to death by lingchi, which would be the earliest case of it occurring. This would go on to be cited in various works, including the Yiwen Leiju, commentaries on the Records of the Grand Historian, and occur in the historical fiction Fengshen Yanyi. However, this is not mentioned in texts prior to the 9th Century record, and the concept of this penalty did not become prevalent until the Liao dynasty encoded it by law in the 10th century, which was wrought with much controversy at the time.

== Mentions in literature and legend ==
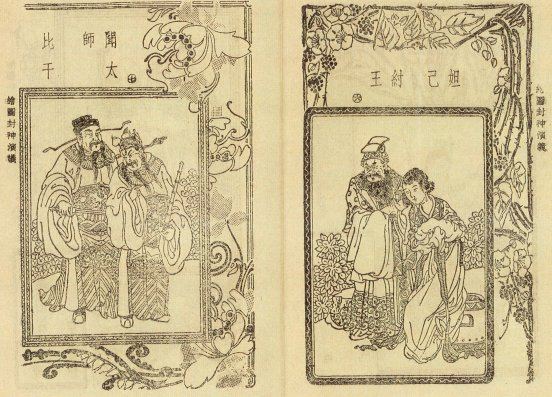
Depictions of Di Xin and Daji (right) in an edition of Fengshen Yanyi.

Di Xin is mentioned in the Confucian Analects (19 "子張"); and also in the Three Character Classic. He is frequently mentioned alongside Jie of Xia as negative examples of Confucian principles, presented as archetypal tyrants who justify regime change according by the Mandate of Heaven.

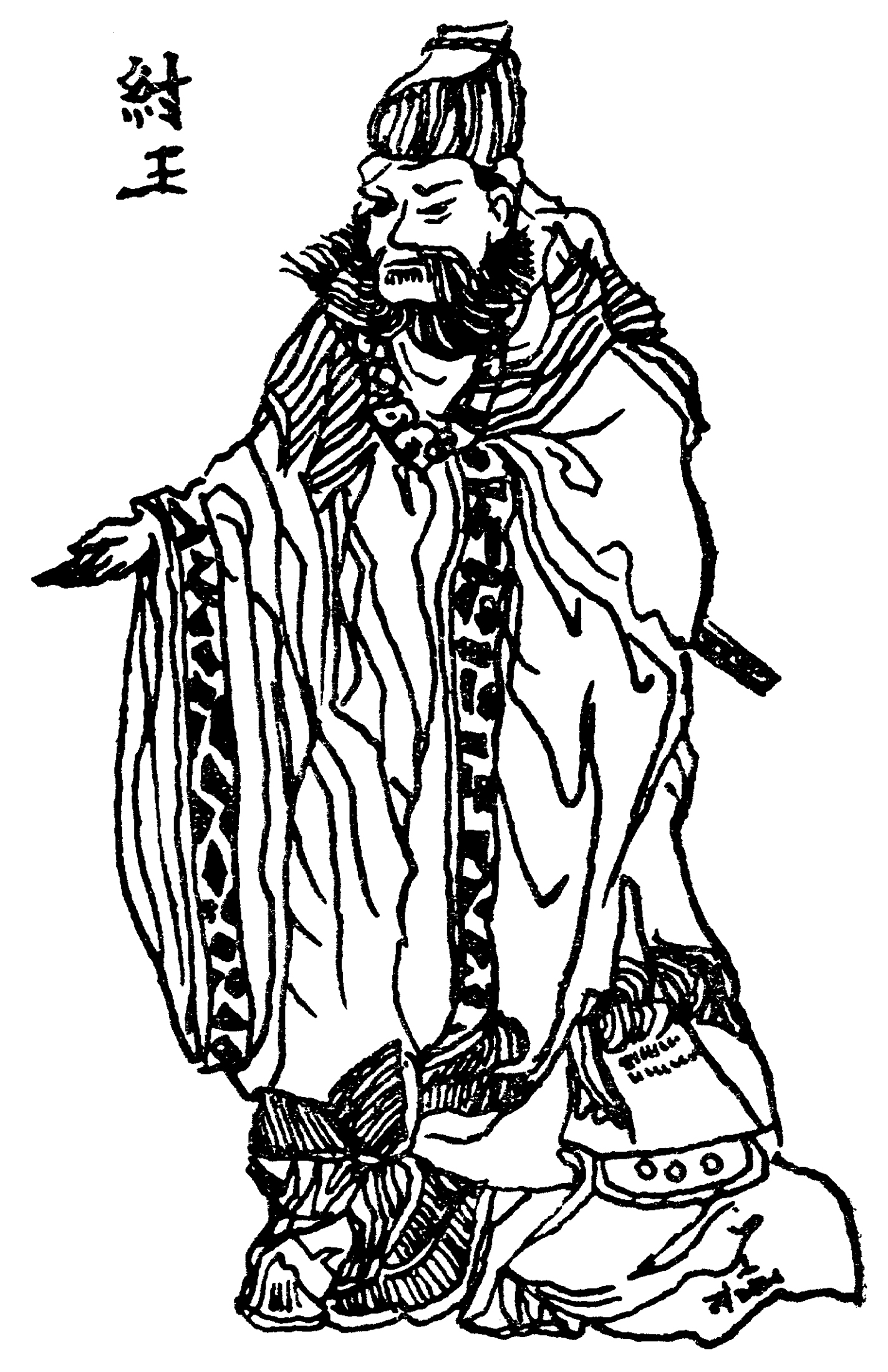
1963 illustration of "King Zhou".

The cautionary tale of "King Zhou" led to his formidable presence in popular culture as an archetypal villain. Among the earliest instances of this was in Fengshen Yanyi (Investiture of the Gods) and its various derivatives. In the text, Di Xin visits the Goddess Nüwa's temple and offended the Goddess with his lustful comments towards her beauty. In response, Nüwa decides that the Shang dynasty should end and sends her three subordinates to become three beautiful women, including Daji, to bewitch Di Xin. Under the influence of these women, Di Xin becomes a ruthless king, losing the support of the people and triggering his downfall. In the same text, Jiang Ziya recognized that Di Xin was a well-versed and well-trained individual who became an incapable ruler only because he had fallen victim to seduction. After his death, Jiang Ziya deified Di Xin as the Tianxi Xing (天喜星 "Star of Heavenly Happiness"). As the Tianxi Xing, he had the responsibility of managing the marriage affairs of humans. In the novel, Di Xin has a wife named Queen Jiang, while Daji served as an imperial concubine. Di Xin had two sons, Yin Hong and Yin Jiao, with Queen Jiang. The character of Queen Jiang in the novel was based on the real historical figure and consort of Di Xin, Jiuhou Nü. Jiuhou Nü was the daughter of the leader of the Guifang, Jiuhou, and was wedded to King Di Xin through a political alliance.

== Notes ==
Di Xin Shang dynasty
Regnal titles
Preceded by Di Yi	King of China; 1075 BC – 1046 BC	Succeeded by Wu of Zhou (Zhou dynasty)
