= Huayue Sanniang =

Chinese goddess

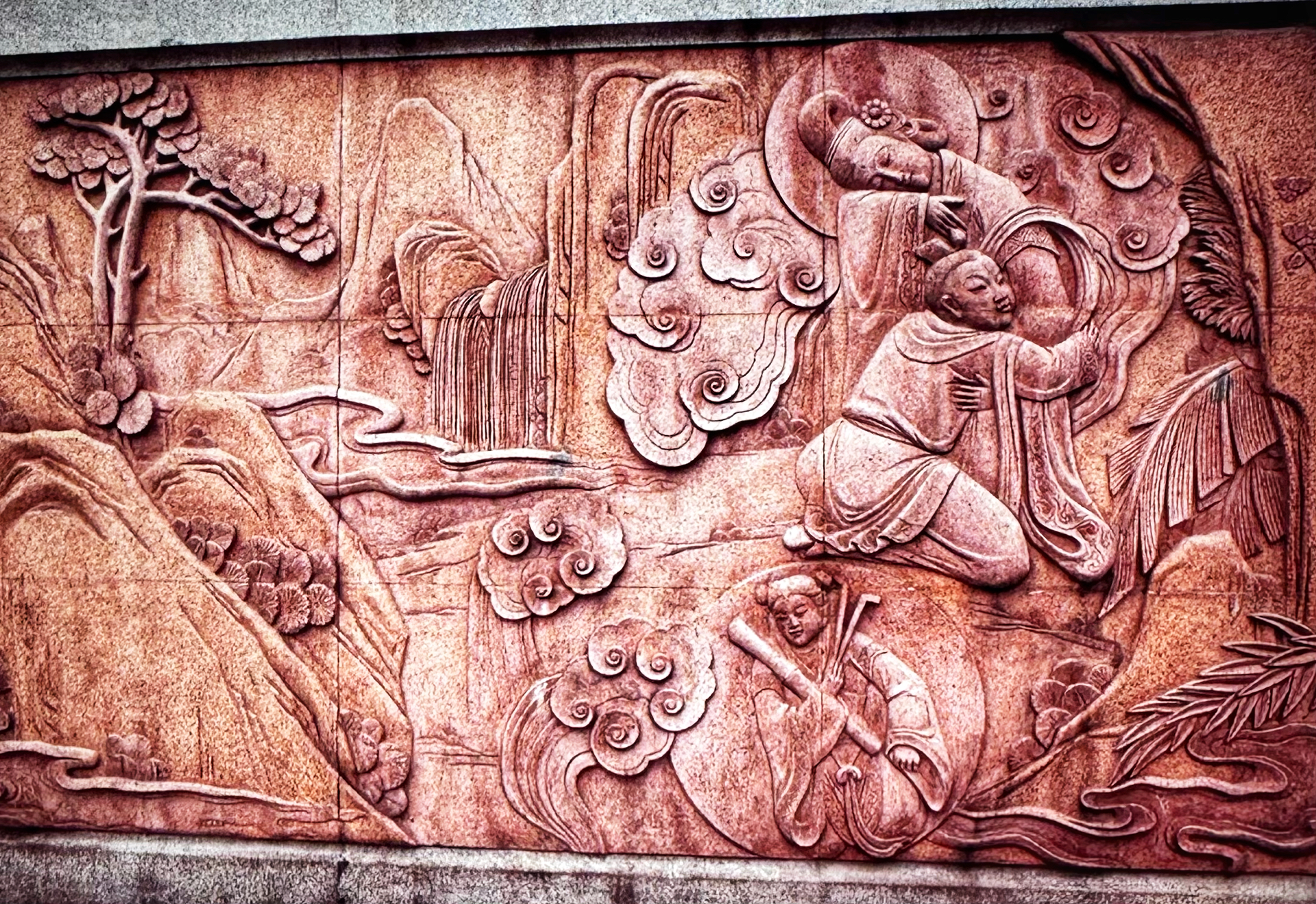
Relief of Liu Chenxiang and Huayue Sanniang.

Huayue Sanniang (Chinese: 華岳三娘), also known as Sanshengmu (Chinese: 三聖母), is a Chinese goddess and third daughter of the Emperor Xiyue, the god of Mount Hua. After marrying a mortal, she was imprisoned under Mount Hua as a punishment for violating the rules of Heaven. At the summit of the Western Peak of Mount Hua, there stands a giant stone known as Axe-splitting Rock, which stands a hundred feet high and is neatly split into three parts. According to legend, it was split by her son Liu Chenxiang in order to rescue her by separating the mountain.

== Legends ==
An early story about the third daughter of the god of Mount Hua appears in Guang yi ji (廣異記), a collection of tales from the Tang dynasty. The story, called Huayue Shennü (華嶽神女), was later included in Taiping Guangji (太平廣記). A scholar meets the goddess while travelling to the capital. They live together for seven years and have two sons and a daughter. She later asks him to marry another woman because she cannot remain his wife forever. They continue to meet, but his new wife's family becomes suspicious and places Taoist charms on him. The goddess then leaves him. Before disappearing, she tells him that she is the third daughter of the god of Mount Hua.

The story of Chenxiang rescuing his mother appeared in later Chinese plays. A lost southern play called Liu Xi Chenxiang Taizi (劉錫沉香太子) was recorded by Xu Wei in Nanci Xulu (南詞敘錄). Its script has not survived. A scene about Liu Xi's marriage to Sanniang survives in Fengyue Jinnang (風月錦囊), a collection of plays printed in 1553. The scene is similar to one in the Puxian opera Liu Xi (劉錫).

In the Puxian opera Liu Xi, Sanniang's brother Erlang has a quarrel with Tieguai Li. At a heavenly gathering, Tieguai Li tells the Queen Mother of the West that Sanniang wishes to marry a mortal. She is then ordered to spend three days with a scholar named Liu Xi. When Liu Xi visits her temple, he sees her statue and writes a poem about her beauty. Sanniang becomes angry and follows him. She later takes human form and meets him at an inn, where they marry.

Sanniang gives Liu Xi a pearl before they part. He fails the imperial examination and later gets into trouble when he tries to sell the pearl. Sanniang appears and saves him. A local magistrate then gives his daughter to Liu Xi in marriage. Sanniang returns to heaven a day late and is imprisoned in the Black Cloud Cave (黑雲洞). She gives birth to Chenxiang in the cave and sends him to Liu Xi. When Chenxiang grows older, he learns about his mother and goes to rescue her. Tieguai Li teaches him magic, and Chenxiang breaks open the cave. The Queen Mother of the West then pardons Sanniang.

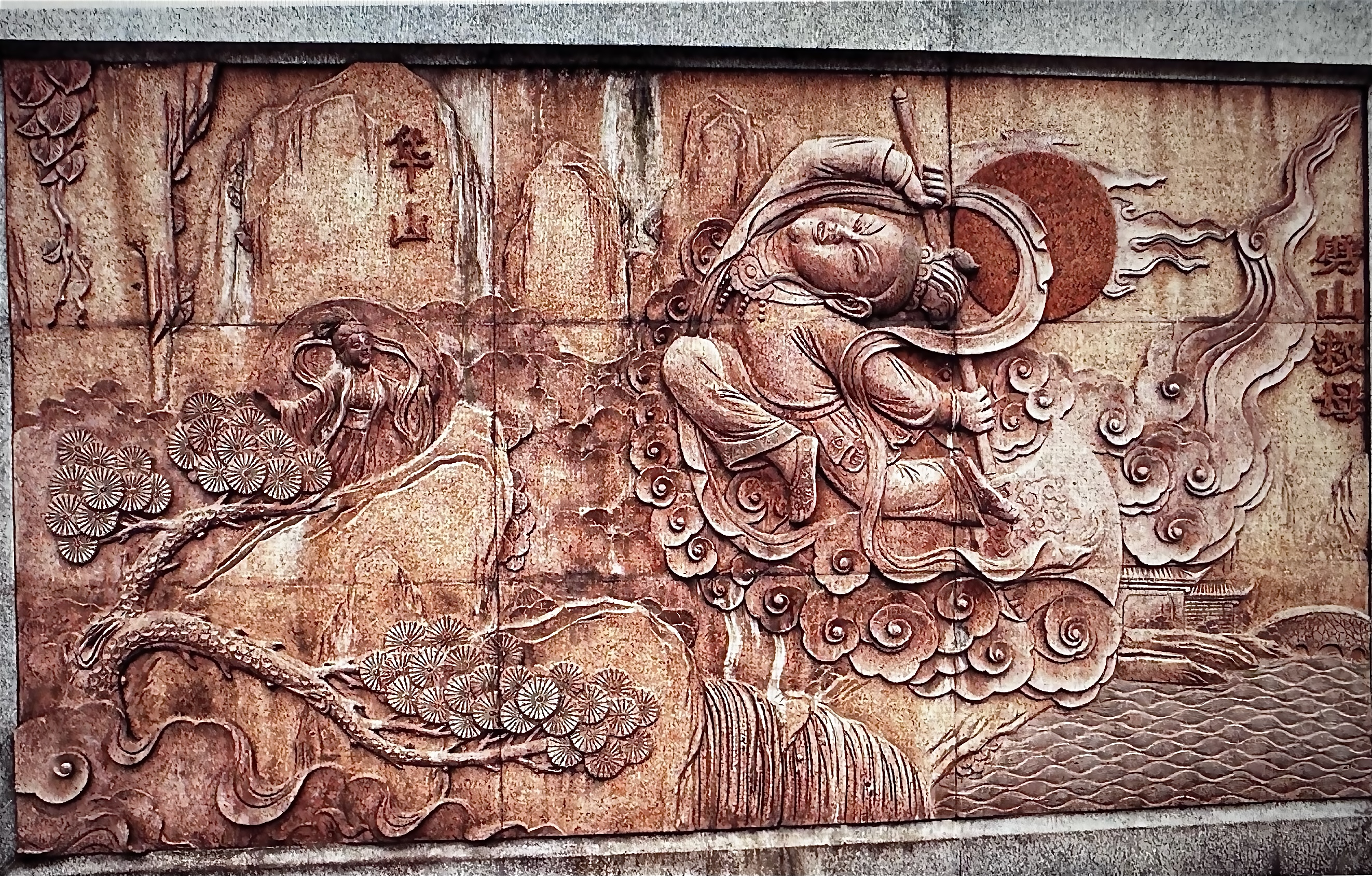
Chenxiang splitting Mount Hua to rescue his mother.

The Qing dynasty Chenxiang Baojuan (沉香寶卷) tells a different story. Liu Xiang (劉向) visits Sanniang's temple and writes a poem about her statue. Sanniang becomes angry and tries to kill him, but the Old Man Under the Moon stops her. He tells her that she and Liu Xiang are meant to marry. Sanniang creates a house and brings a storm to make Liu Xiang stay there. When he refuses to marry her, she uses magic to block his escape. They marry and spend three nights together.

Before Liu Xiang leaves, Sanniang gives him three treasures. He later faces several dangers because of them. A dragon steals the treasures, a woman tries to poison him, and an official accuses him of theft. Sanniang saves him from execution. Liu Xiang is then appointed Prefect of Yangzhou. Sanniang's brother Erlang later learns of their marriage and imprisons her beneath Mount Hua. She gives birth to Chenxiang under the mountain and sends him to his father with a letter written in blood.

At thirteen, Chenxiang learns that his mother is imprisoned. He travels to the Zhongnan Mountains and becomes a disciple of He Xiangu. He later enters a forbidden cave and takes magical treasures. After learning to use them, he returns to Mount Hua and fights Erlang. Other immortals join the battle, and Guanyin asks the Jade Emperor to stop the fighting. Chenxiang splits Mount Hua with his axe and frees his mother. The Jade Emperor pardons Sanniang and gives Chenxiang a heavenly position. Liu Xiang becomes an Earth God in Yangzhou.

Other stage versions include Liu Yanchang's second wife, Wang Guiying (王桂英), and their son Qiu'er (秋兒). In the opera Ertang Shezi (二堂舍子), Chenxiang and Qiu'er grow up together. After Chenxiang kills another boy during a fight at school, Wang Guiying lets him escape and gives up her own son in his place. Chenxiang later receives help from an immortal named Pili Daxian (霹靂大仙), defeats Erlang, and frees his mother.

== Conflations ==
In early stories, Huayue Sanniang is the third daughter of the god of Mount Hua, also known as Emperor Xiyue. She is not the daughter of Yunhua or the sister of Yang Jian. Her story was later combined with that of Erlang Shen. In later versions, her brother Huayue Erlang was replaced by Guankou Erlang, who came to be known as Yang Jian. Sanniang thus became Yang Jian's younger sister.

In the Tang dynasty collection Guang yi ji, Sanniang marries an unnamed scholar and has two sons and a daughter. Erlang Shen does not appear in this story. In later stories, her husband is named Liu Xi, Liu Xiang, or Liu Yanchang. The Qing dynasty Chenxiang Baojuan (沉香宝卷) describes Liu Xiang as the rebirth of a Golden Boy from heaven.

In the later Lotus Lantern story, Erlang Shen imprisons Sanniang beneath Mount Hua after learning of her marriage. Her son Chenxiang later defeats him and frees his mother.

== In modern media ==
The Hebei bangzi opera Lotus Lantern was developed in 1959 and first performed in 1960. It follows Chenxiang's journey to rescue Sanniang from Mount Hua. A film of the stage performance was made in 1976.

In the 2005 Chinese television series Lotus Lantern, Sanniang falls in love with Liu Yanchang and gives birth to Chenxiang. Her brother Erlang Shen discovers their relationship and imprisons her beneath Mount Hua. Chenxiang grows up without knowing the truth about his mother. He later learns what happened and sets out to save her.

== Worship ==
Huayue Sanniang is worshipped at the Xiyue Temple in Huayin, Shaanxi. The temple was built to honor the god of Mount Hua. Her shrine, known as Sanshengmu Temple (三圣母庙), is in the eastern courtyard of the complex. According to local tradition, this is where Liu Yanchang mourned Sanniang in the story of the Lotus Lantern. She is worshipped alongside her son Liu Chenxiang and her servant Lingzhi.

Sanniang is also worshipped at Cuiyun Palace (翠云宫), also called Shengmu Palace (圣母宫), on the West Peak of Mount Hua. The palace contains a statue of her. Nearby is the Axe-splitting Rock (斧劈石), a large stone split into three parts. According to legend, Chenxiang split the rock with an axe to free his mother. A large iron axe stands beside it.

In local folk belief, Sanniang is worshipped for protection and good fortune. People also pray to her for good harvests and help with marriage. Worship at her shrine in Xiyue Temple continues today.

== In popular culture ==
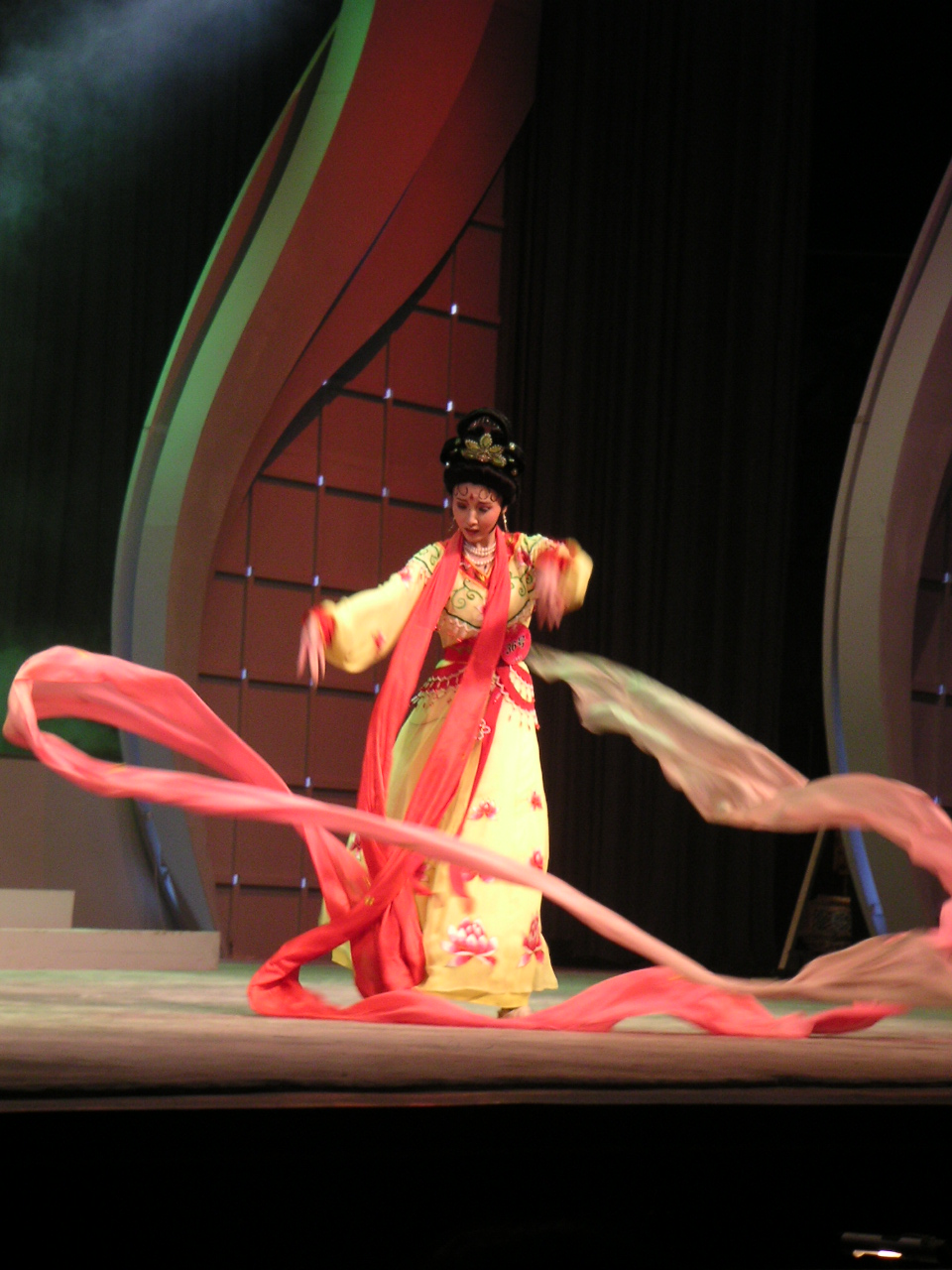
A Yue opera actress playing Sanshengmu, in 2006

=== Films ===
- Save Mother from Mountain (小英雄劈山救母), a 1928 Chinese film
- Breaking Open the Mountain to Rescue Mother (劈山救母), a 1950 Hong Kong film
- The Precious Lotus Lamp (寶蓮燈), a 1956 Hong Kong Cantonese opera film
- The Precious Lotus Lamp, Part II (1957)
- The Precious Lotus Lamp, Part III (1958)
- The Magic Lotus Lantern (寶蓮燈), a 1959 Chinese film
- Breaking Open the Mountain to Rescue Mother (劈山救母), a 1961 Taiwanese film
- The Lotus Lamp (七彩寶蓮燈), a 1963 Hong Kong Cantonese opera film
- The Magic Lamp (寶蓮燈), a 1964 Hong Kong Huangmei opera film
- The Lotus Lamp (寶蓮燈), a 1965 Hong Kong film
- The Magic Lotus Lantern (寶蓮燈), a 1976 Hebei bangzi film

=== Animation films ===
- Saving Mother (西嶽奇童), a 1984 Chinese film
- Lotus Lantern, a 1999 Chinese film
- Chen Xiang (西嶽奇童), a 2006 Chinese film
- New Gods: Yang Jian, a popular Chinese animation

=== TV series ===
- The Lamp Lore (寶蓮燈), a 1986 Hong Kong TV series
- The Polien Lantern (天地傳說之寶蓮燈), a 2001 Chinese-Taiwanese TV series
- Lotus Lantern, a 2005 Chinese TV series
- Prelude of Lotus Lantern (2009)

== See also ==
- Yue Lao
