= Prelude of Lotus Lantern =

Chinese television series

- Genre: Chinese mythology, fantasy, historical
- Based on: Lotus Lantern
- Written by: Wang Biao (Jiu Nian)
- Directed by: Mang San Yu
- Starring: Vincent Chiao; Zhou Yang; Liu Xiaoqing; Liu Tao
- Ending theme: Cao Fujia A mountain in the distance
- Country of origin: China
- Original language: Mandarin
- No. of episodes: 46

Production
- Executive producer: Li Gongda
- Production location: Zhuozhou World Studios
- Cinematography: Guan Jianxiong; Gu Qiming
- Editor: Hou Qi
- Production companies: China Teleplay Production Center Co., Ltd. Beijing Songlian International Film and TV Cultural Media co., LTD; Beijing Dahui Cultural Development Co., Ltd. Beijing Tianxingji Film and TV Cultural Communications co., LTD.

Original release
- Network: CCTV-8
- Release: April 14 – April 29, 2009

Prelude of Lotus Lantern
- Traditional Chinese: 寶蓮燈前傳
- Simplified Chinese: 宝莲灯前传
Transcriptions
Standard Mandarin
- Hanyu Pinyin: Bǎoliándēng Qiánzhuàn

Prelude of Lotus Lantern (Chinese: 宝莲灯前传) is a 2009 Chinese mythology fantasy television series. The television series directed by Hong Kong director Mang San Yu and written by Wang Biao, and starring Vincent Chiao, Zhou Yang, Liu Xiaoqing and Liu Tao. It tells the story of Erlang Shen, a popular Chinese God in Chinese mythology. The series serve as a prequel of the 2005's Lotus Lantern (TV series)

== Plot ==
This is the prequel to Lotus Lantern. The story this time focus on around Chen Xiang's uncle Er Lang Shen and his mother Sanshengmu .

== Cast ==
- Vincent Chiao as Erlang Shen (Yang Jian).
  - Niu Junfeng as young Erlang Shen
- Zhou Yang as Sanshengmu, a niece of Jade Emperor, the third daughter of Yaoji.
- Liu Xiaoqing as Xi Wangmu.
- Liu Tao as Yaoji.
- Li Guangjie as Yang Tianyou.
- Jenny Guo as the Seventh Fairy.
- Kira Lu as Bamei.
- Li Xinru as Chang'e.
- Wang Weiguo as Jade Emperor.
- Tan Xiaoyan as Guanyin.
- Alvin Wong as Yuding Zhenren.
- Wu Guohua as Taiyi Zhenren.
- Xie Ning as Zhu Bajie.
- Ding Jian as Sun Wukong.
- Chen Chuang as Xiaotianquan
- Song Zuer as Nezha.
- Yvonne Lim as Princess San, the third daughter of Dragon King.
- Cao Jun as Chenxiang. (Guest Star in episode 46)

== Production ==
The television series shot the scene in Zhuozhou World Studios of Zhuozhou city, Hebei province, China.

It was a hot TV series in CCTV-8 and one of the most watched ones in mainland China in that year.
