= Liu Chenxiang =

- The Magic Lotus Lantern character
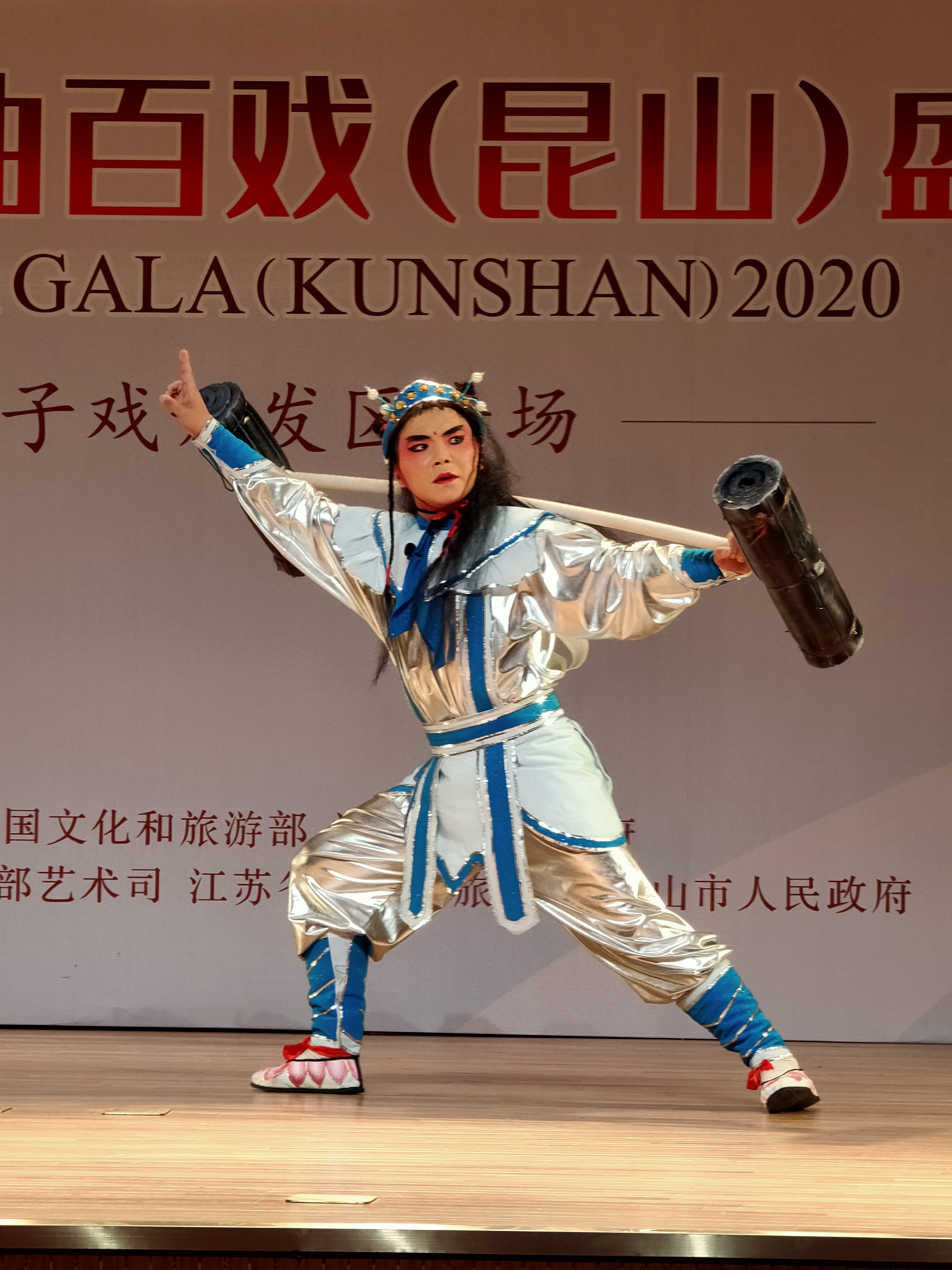
- Chenxiang portrayed by a Ninghe opera actor

In-universe information
- Species: Demi-God
- Gender: Male
- Relatives: Huayue Sanniang (mother); Liu Yanchang (father); Huayue Erlang (uncle)

Liu Chenxiang (Chinese: 刘沉香) is a folk hero and demigod in the Chinese folktale The Magic Lotus Lantern. On the Western Peak of Mount Hua stands the legendary Axe-splitting Rock, a giant stone approximately one hundred feet tall, marked by three distinct cut sections. According to legend, Liu Chenxiang cleaved this rock in his heroic effort to split the mountain and rescue his mother, who was imprisoned within.

== Source ==
The stories in the Yuan and Ming dynasty plays, such as Prince Chenxiang Splits Mount Hua (沉香太子劈华山) and Splitting Mount Hua to Rescue Mother (劈华山救母), are lost. The latter half of the Nanxi opera Prince Liu Xi Chenxiang (刘锡沉香太子) from the 32nd year of the Jiajing era in the Ming dynasty is also lost. However, the captivating narrative of the Lotus Lantern is meticulously chronicled in the esteemed Qing dynasty treasure scroll known as Chenxiang Treasure Scroll (沉香宝卷).

The tale of the Lotus Lantern reached its final form during the Qing dynasty, influenced by the widespread popularity of the novel Journey to the West. It is an adaptation of the legend of Yan Jian, who split the mountain to save his mother. The origins of the story of Liu Chenxiang splitting the mountain to save his mother can be traced back to the 32nd year of the Ming dynasty’s Jiajing period, specifically in the Puxian opera Prince Liu Xi Chenxiang. Throughout the generations, the story of Liu Chenxiang has been passed down, resulting in various versions with different storylines. One such version is the Nanyin opera Chenxiang Prince Nanyin, which, according to the script, does not include the plot of Sanniang being crushed or the storyline of saving the mother by cutting the mountain.

== Legend ==
The story of Liu Chenxiang has undergone numerous adaptations, with variations and conflicting details, but the general plot outline is as follows:

Liu Chenxiang is the son of Liu Yanchang, also known as Liu Xi, a scholar, and Huayue Sanniang, the daughter of Emperor Xiyue (西岳大帝), one of the Five Great Mountain Emperors. Huayue has a brother named Huashan Erlang. When Erlang discovers this forbidden union, he becomes furious and imprisons his sister beneath a mountain, punishing her for violating heaven's rules by marrying a human. As Liu Chenxiang grows, he learns of his mother's plight. Guided by the celestial mentor Pili Daxian, he sheds his mortal constraints and gains powerful skills. Under Pili Daxian's tutelage, Liu Chenxiang masters divine abilities, allowing him to challenge his uncle, Erlang. In the end, Liu Chenxiang defeats Erlang, splits the mountain, and rescues his mother, restoring their family and ending the conflict. The Jade Emperor then decrees that Huayue Erlang be demoted to the back hall of Mount Hua, while Huayue Sanniang is placed in charge of the front hall. Liu Xi is appointed as the City God of Yangzhou, and Liu Chenxiang becomes the ruler of the Three Realms.

In the 18th-century Qing dynasty's Chenxiang Treasure Scroll (沉香宝卷), Liu Chenxiang is thirteen years old when he rescues his mother. The story follows his growth from the age of seven at the beginning to thirteen during the mountain splitting incident. In this version, it is not Tieguai Li but Lü Dongbin who takes Liu Chenxiang as his disciple. His teacher varies depending on the preference of the storyteller, including Monkey King, Lü Dongbin, He Xiangu, Li Tieguai, Taibai Jinxing, Pili Daxian, and Shen Gongbao. Lü Dongbin grants Chenxiang a sword to fight against Erlang, assisting him from the sidelines.

Towards the end of the story, Liu Chenxiang is deceived by Erlang and imprisoned in a deep well along with Sanniang, facing the imminent threat of being burned alive. Fortunately, Lü Dongbin arrives just in time to rescue them. Eventually, with the combined efforts of San Shengmu and Liu Chenxiang, they defeat Erlang and free themselves. As a result, the Jade Emperor decrees that mother and son must return to heaven.

Liu Chenxiang is often mistakenly identified as the nephew of Erlang Shen. However, in the original story, the Erlang mentioned is not Erlang Shen of Sichuan but Huayue Erlang, the guardian of Huashan and the son of Emperor Xiyue. The misconception that confused these figures originated from the 2005 TV series Lotus Lantern, which inaccurately depicted Liu Chenxiang’s mother as the younger sister of Erlang Shen. This confusion arose due to the gradual merging of the two legends over generations. The misconception has also led to the portrayal of Erlang Shen as Liu Chenxiang's uncle in modern films and animations.

== Influence ==
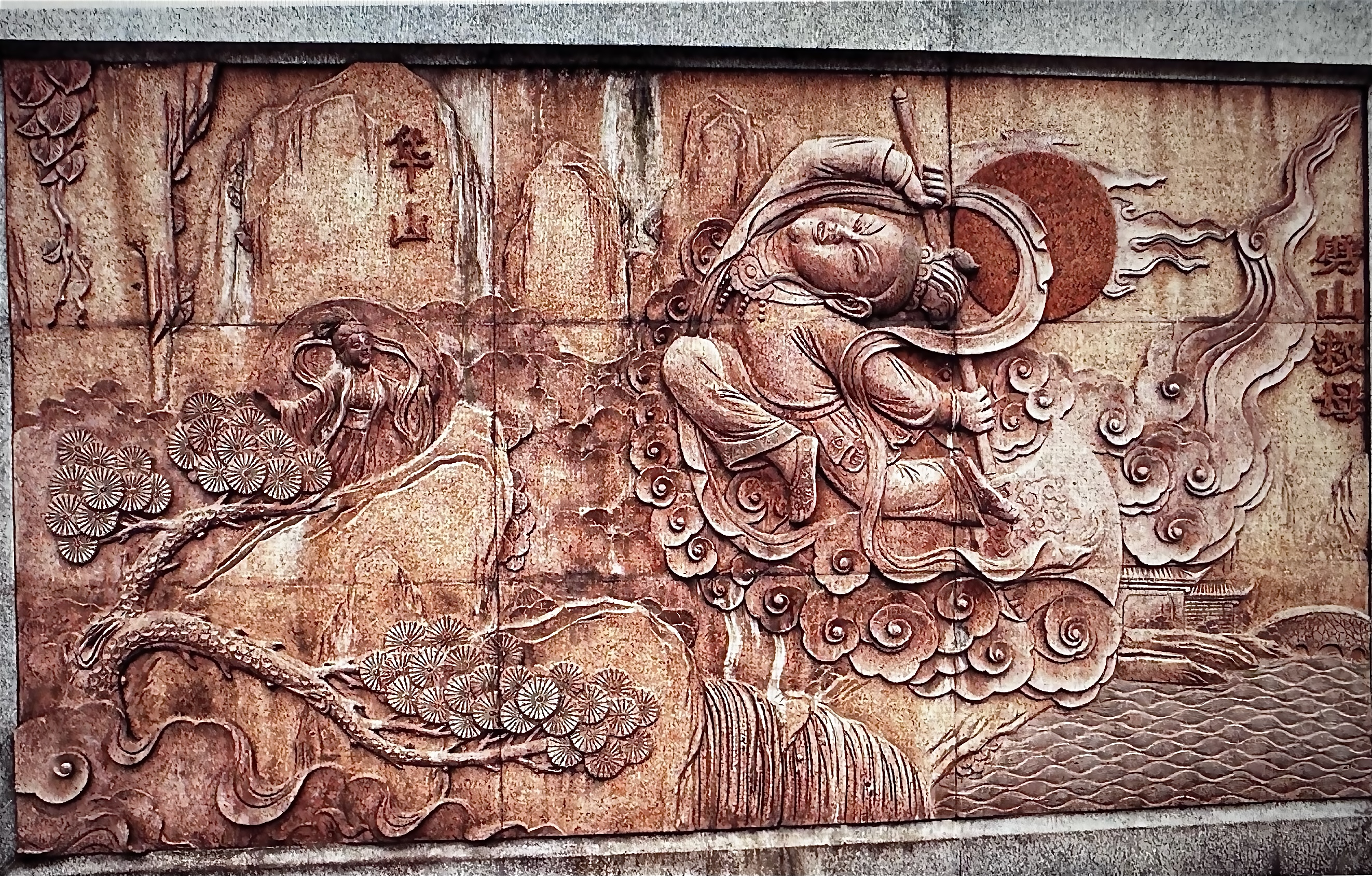
Chen Xiang split the mountain in order to save his mother

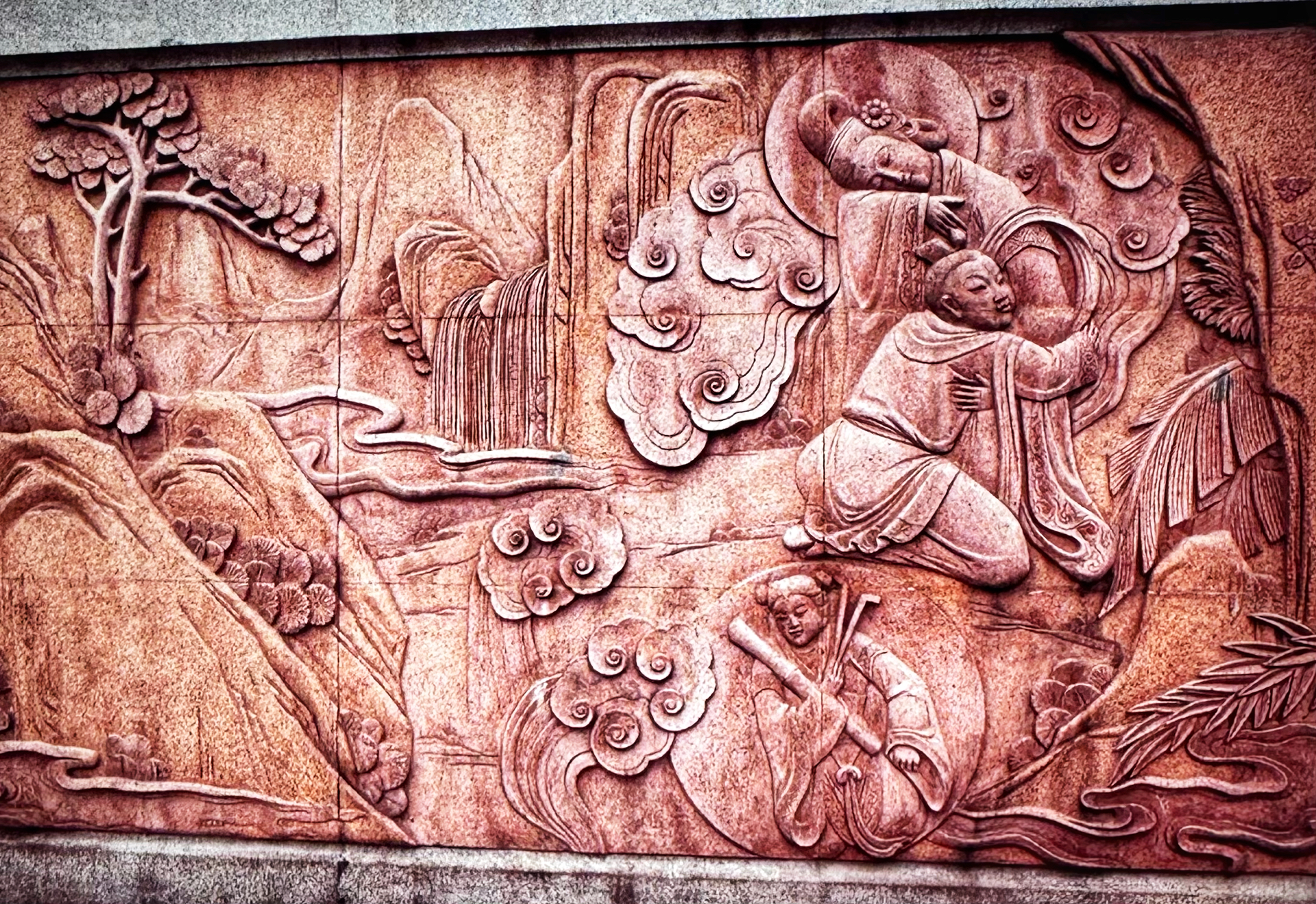
Relief of Liu Chenxiang and Huayue Sanniang.

=== Films ===
- Save Mother from Mountain (小英雄劈山救母), a 1928 Chinese film
- Breaking Open the Mountain to Rescue Mother (劈山救母), a 1950 Hong Kong film
- The Precious Lotus Lamp (寶蓮燈), a 1956 Hong Kong Cantonese opera film
- The Precious Lotus Lamp, Part II (1957)
- The Precious Lotus Lamp, Part III (1958)
- The Magic Lotus Lantern (寶蓮燈), a 1959 Chinese film
- Breaking Open the Mountain to Rescue Mother (劈山救母), a 1961 Taiwanese film
- The Lotus Lamp (七彩寶蓮燈), a 1963 Hong Kong Cantonese opera film
- The Magic Lamp (寶蓮燈), a 1964 Hong Kong Huangmei opera film
- The Lotus Lamp (寶蓮燈), a 1965 Hong Kong film
- The Magic Lotus Lantern (寶蓮燈), a 1976 Hebei bangzi film

=== Animation films ===
- Saving Mother (西嶽奇童), a 1984 Chinese film
- Lotus Lantern, a 1999 Chinese film
- Chen Xiang (西嶽奇童), a 2006 Chinese film
- New Gods: Yang Jian, a 2022 Chinese film

=== TV series ===
- The Lamp Lore (寶蓮燈), a 1986 Hong Kong TV series
- The Polien Lantern (天地傳說之寶蓮燈), a 2001 Chinese-Taiwanese TV series
- Lotus Lantern, a 2005 Chinese TV series
- Prelude of Lotus Lantern (2009)
