= Yunhua =

Chinese goddess and mother of Erlang Shen

Yunhua (Chinese: 云华; lit. 'Cloud Flower'), also known as Yunhua Nü (云花女), is a goddess in Chinese mythology and the mother of Erlang Shen. In the Ming dynasty Erlang Baojuan (二郎宝卷), she is a heavenly maiden who marries a mortal scholar named Yang Tianyou and gives birth to Erlang Shen. She is later imprisoned beneath a mountain and rescued by her son.

== Legends ==
=== Erlang Baojuan ===
The Erlang Baojuan (二郎宝卷) tells the story of Yunhua and her son Erlang Shen. A printed edition dates to the Jiajing reign of the Ming dynasty. The scholar Hu Shih examined a copy dated 1555 and wrote about the story of Erlang rescuing his mother.

Yunhua is a fairy from Dou Niu Palace (斗牛宫). She has five elder brothers and two elder sisters, Tianhua (天花女) and Jinhua (金花女). The five brothers represent the Five Qi Returning to the Origin (五气朝元), while the three sisters represent the Three Flowers Gathering (三花聚顶). Her brothers are the Wood Virtue Star Lord (木德星君), Fire Virtue Star Lord (火德星君), Metal Virtue General (金德将军), Black Warrior General (玄武将军), and Wuji Zhenjun (无极真君).

Yunhua descends to the human world to find Yang Tianyou, a scholar who was once the Left Golden Boy (左金童) in heaven. She takes the form of a young woman and visits him in his study. They marry and have a son, Yang Erlang.

When Erlang is still a child, Sun Xingzhe (孙行者) imprisons Yunhua beneath a mountain. Erlang is taken to heaven by the Queen Mother of the West. After learning of his mother's imprisonment, he sets out to rescue her. With the Queen Mother's help, he moves mountains, pursues the sun, and splits the mountain with an axe. He finds Yunhua and prepares medicine to revive her. After they are reunited, Erlang captures Sun Xingzhe and imprisons him beneath a mountain.

=== Journey to the West ===
In Journey to the West, Erlang Shen's mother is mentioned in Chapter 6. During their fight, Sun Wukong reminds Erlang that his mother was the Jade Emperor's younger sister. She had descended to the human world and married a mortal called Yang Jun (杨君). Their son later split Peach Mountain (桃山) with an axe to save her. The novel does not give her a name.

=== Regional folk tales ===
In a folk tale from Fugu County, Shaanxi, Erlang Shen's mother is the Jade Emperor's younger sister. She secretly marries a mortal scholar surnamed Yang and has three children. When the Jade Emperor learns of her marriage, he imprisons her beneath Peach Mountain. Her second son, Yang Jian, later splits the mountain with an axe and frees her. He takes her into the sunlight, but the Jade Emperor sends nine suns to kill her. Yang Jian then pursues the suns and traps eight of them beneath mountains, leaving one in the sky.

The story also appears in Yangxi, a form of traditional theatre performed in Guizhou. In the Fuquan play Chu Erlang (出二郎), Erlang's mother is a heavenly princess who descends to the human world without permission. In the Luodian version of Taoshan Jiumu (桃山救母), she is punished for taking water from the Heavenly River without permission.

In Xifeng County, a play called Shang Yuntai (上云台) tells another version. Erlang's mother is the Jade Emperor's eldest daughter. She secretly marries a mortal named Li Dou (李斗). Their son, Li Lianbao (李连保), later takes the form of Yang Jian and studies under Yuding Zhenren. He receives weapons and learns magical skills before going to Peach Mountain to rescue his mother. After the rescue, the Jade Emperor gives him divine titles.

== Mythological sites ==
Several places in China are linked to the story of Erlang Shen rescuing his mother.

Banla Mountain (半拉山), near Dade Township in Zhangwu County, Liaoning, is known as Taoshan in local tradition. It is said to be the mountain split by Erlang Shen to rescue his mother. A place at the foot of the mountain is said to mark where she was imprisoned. Local stories also mention a turtle and an eagle guarding her.

Cixiao Pavilion (慈孝阁) stands in Erlangshen Cultural Relic Park in Guannan County, Jiangsu. The pavilion has a shrine to Erlang Shen's mother. It also displays the story of Erlang splitting a mountain to rescue her.

Yunmen Mountain, near Qingzhou, Shandong, has another local story about Erlang Shen splitting a mountain. A cleft between the peaks is said to have been made by his axe.

== Other identities ==
Yunhua Nü is sometimes confused with Yaoji, the goddess of Wushan. The two names appear in different stories. In the Erlang Baojuan, Yunhua Nü is the mother of Erlang Shen. In the Daoist Yongcheng Jixianlu (墉城集仙录), compiled by Du Guangting, Yaoji is called Yunhua Furen (雲華夫人). She is the twenty-third daughter of the Queen Mother of the West and helps Yu the Great control the floods. Erlang Shen does not appear in her story.

In later versions of the Lotus Lantern story, Erlang Shen also has a younger sister, Huayue Sanniang, whose son Chenxiang splits Mount Hua to rescue her. The early story of the Huayue goddess is different. In the Tang dynasty Guang yi ji, she is the third daughter of the god of Mount Hua and marries a mortal scholar. Erlang Shen is not part of that story.

In the 2009 television series The Prelude of Lotus Lantern (宝莲灯前传), Erlang Shen's mother is named Yaoji (瑶姬). She is the Jade Emperor's younger sister and the mother of Yang Jiao, Yang Jian, and Yang Chan. She is played by Liu Tao.

== In popular culture ==
- Portrayed by Liu Tao as the role of Yaoji, the mother of Erlang Shen, in the 2009 television series The Prelude of Lotus Lantern.
- Portrayed by Weng Hong in the 2021 film The Magic Lotus Lantern (天地宝莲灯).
