= The Magic Lotus Lantern =

Chinese fairy tale

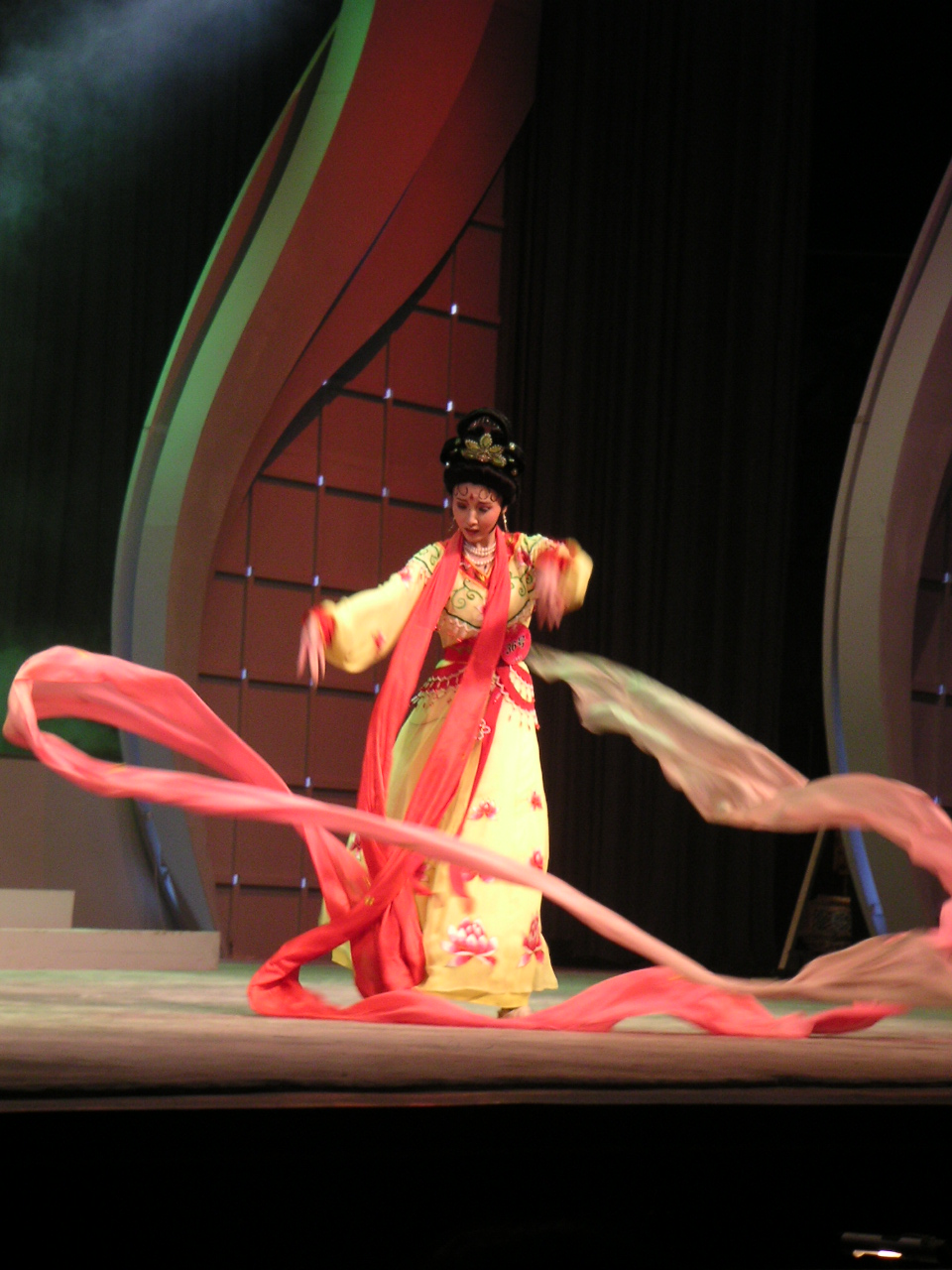
A Yue opera actress playing Sanshengmu, a major character, in 2006.

The Magic Lotus Lantern is a Chinese fairy tale from the Tang dynasty (618–907).

== Story ==
Goddess Sanshengmu falls in love with a mortal man, Liu Yangcheng. Against the wishes of her brother, Erlang Shen, she steals an artefact known as the lotus lantern, capable of subduing any creature man, beast, and even deity, and escapes Heaven to be with her lover. She later births a son whom they name Chenxiang. When Chenxiang is seven-years-old, however, the family is discovered by Erlang Shen, who kidnaps the child and demands the return of the lotus lantern. Though San Shengmu acquiesces, she is imprisoned under Mount Hua as punishment. Chenxiang learns of her fate and vows to get the lantern back in hopes he can free her. As he grows into a young man, he comes under the tutelage of Sun Wukong, who crafts for him a powerful axe which he uses to take on his uncle. However, Chenxiang remains unable to beat him and, just as he is about to be killed by Erlang Shen, light from the lotus lantern merges with Chenxiang granting him enough strength to defeat his uncle. Chenxiang splits the mountain in half using the axe, freeing Sanshengmu and reuniting mother and child.

== Adaptations ==
=== Films ===
- Save Mother from Mountain (小英雄劈山救母), a 1928 Chinese film
- Breaking Open the Mountain to Rescue Mother (劈山救母), a 1950 Hong Kong film
- The Precious Lotus Lamp (寶蓮燈), a 1956 Hong Kong Cantonese opera film
- The Precious Lotus Lamp, Part II (1957)
- The Precious Lotus Lamp, Part III (1958)
- The Magic Lotus Lantern (寶蓮燈), a 1959 Chinese film
- Breaking Open the Mountain to Rescue Mother (劈山救母), a 1961 Taiwanese film
- The Lotus Lamp (七彩寶蓮燈), a 1963 Hong Kong Cantonese opera film
- The Magic Lamp (寶蓮燈), a 1964 Hong Kong Huangmei opera film
- The Lotus Lamp (寶蓮燈), a 1965 Hong Kong film
- The Magic Lotus Lantern (寶蓮燈), a 1976 Hebei bangzi film

=== Animated films ===
- Saving Mother (西嶽奇童), a 1984 Chinese film
- Lotus Lantern, a 1999 Chinese film
- Chen Xiang (西嶽奇童), a 2006 Chinese film
- New Gods: Yang Jian, a 2022 Chinese film

=== TV series ===
- The Lamp Lore (寶蓮燈), a 1986 Hong Kong TV series
- The Polien Lantern (天地傳說之寶蓮燈), a 2001 Chinese-Taiwanese TV series
- Lotus Lantern, a 2005 Chinese TV series
- Prelude of Lotus Lantern (2009)
