= Xiyue Dadi =

Chinese god of Mount Hua

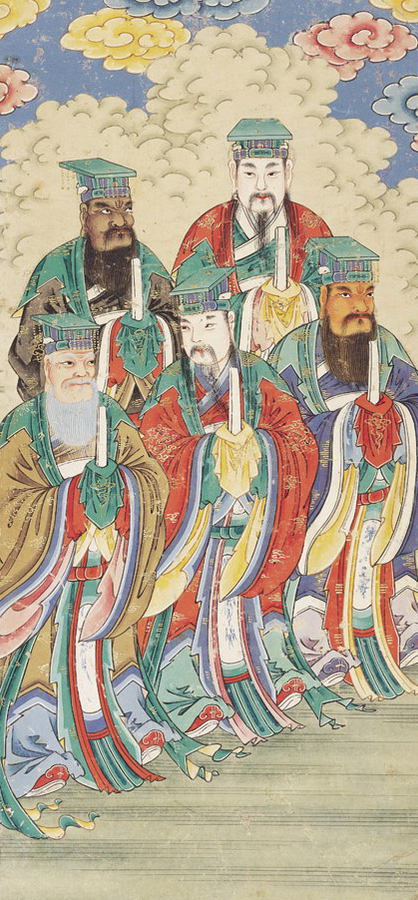
- The Great Emperors of the Five Mountains
- Traditional Chinese: 西嶽大帝
- Simplified Chinese: 西岳大帝
- Literal meaning: The Great Emperor of the Western Summit
Transcriptions
Standard Mandarin
- Hanyu Pinyin: Xīyuè Dàdì

Emperor Xiyue (or Xiyue Dadi Chinese: 西岳大帝; lit. 'the Great Emperor of the Western Summit') is a Taoist deity of the sacred mountain Mount Hua and one of the Great Emperors of the Five Sacred Mountains. It is said that the worship of Xiyue Dadi can be traced back to the Shang dynasty when he was revered as the ancestor of Dayu. In the period of Emperor Wu of the Han Dynasty, a large-scale sacrificial temple was constructed for Xiyue Dadi as a gesture of respect towards this deity. Xiyue Dadi is the father of Huashan Erlang, Huashan Sanlang and Huayue Sanniang.

== Legends ==
Belief in Xiyue Dadi originated from the worship of mountains and rivers in ancient China. Mount Hua holds a revered status among the Five Sacred Mountains due to its close proximity to Chang'an, the capital of the Han and Tang dynasties. During the Eastern Han dynasty, it was believed that the god of Mount Hua possessed the power to bring abundant clouds and rain, foster the growth of all things, bestow blessings, and bring benefit to the people. During the Tang dynasty, Emperor Xuanzong of Tang officially designated Mount Hua as the sacred mountain of the Tang royal family, bestowing upon its revered deity the prestigious title of the "King of the Metal Heavens". Hence, the imperial court conducted worship ceremonies for Xiyue Dadi, following the same rituals and traditions as those performed for the Three Great Gods (Sangong).

Legend says that Emperor Xiyue holds authority over the ranks of immortals, ghosts, and gods, as well as the rewards and punishments of the people. All significant events are reported to the Jade Emperor, who issues decrees through Tianzhao. Minor matters are left to the discretion of Emperor Xiyue himself. According to tradition, November 6 is celebrated as the birthday of the Xiyue Emperor. On this auspicious day, devotees and worshippers gather to honor and pay homage to the Emperor, offering prayers, incense, and rituals to express their reverence and seek blessings.

Taoism has exerted a significant influence on the worship of Xiyue Dadi. According to Taoist beliefs, Xiyue the Great is believed to be the god of the School of Yin-Yang, possessing the ability to govern the natural fluctuations of the heavens and the earth, manipulate the wind and rain, and harness his divine essence. Within the Taoist cosmology, Xiyue Dadi holds the esteemed position of the high god among the five sacred mountains and ranks among the principal deities under the leadership of the Taoist supreme figure, Tianshidao.

The legend of Xiyue Dadi is deeply intertwined with Chinese history and culture. Numerous renowned figures from Chinese history, including Qin Shihuang, Tang Taizong, and Sun Yat-sen, have visited Mount Hua. An ancient saying among Chinese scholars has been passed down through generations, stating, "If you do not visit Huashan, you are not a true hero, and if you do not visit Huayue, your life is in vain." This saying reflects the esteemed status and profound influence of Xiyue Dadi within Confucianism.

According to the historical text Weishu, the god of Mount Hua was known as Hao Yushou, bearing the surname Hao and the given name Yushou.

In some local folklore, the god of Mount Hua was believed to have a substantial divine family, all of whom were revered by the people. However, the god and his womenfolk, as the legend goes, frequently exhibited behaviors that were deemed inappropriate for their divine status. The god himself was known for preying upon the souls of mortal women, while his wives engaged in romantic relationships with mortal men. The god's third daughter, Huayue Sanniang, was known for her irresistible beauty and went against her father's wishes by marrying a mortal. In later centuries, the captivating tales of Huayue Sanniang's amorous adventures took on new forms and became known as the "Legend of Chenxiang" and "The Magic Lotus Lantern." Chenxiang, the central character, is the son of Huayue Sanniang and her mortal husband, Liu Xiang. Huayue Sanniang faced imprisonment beneath Mount Hua as punishment for violating the rules of Heaven. At the summit of Mount Hua's Western Peak stands a giant rock known as Axe-splitting Rock. Rising a hundred feet high and neatly split into three parts, it holds a significant place in legends. According to the tale, it was Chenxiang who, in a courageous attempt, split the rock to rescue his mother by separating the mountain.

According to the novel Investiture of the Gods (Fengshen Yanyi), Xiyue Dadi is depicted as Jiang Xiong. It is stated that Huang Feihu, Chong Heihu, Wenpin, Cui Ying, and Jiang Xiong met their demise at the hands of Zhang Kui during the battle. Following his death, Jiang Ziya deified him as the Jintian Yuansheng Emperor of Mount Hua, and he is revered as one of the Emperors of the Five Sacred Mountains.

According to Volume 4 of the Romance of Immortals of Past Dynasties, it is stated that Gaoyao underwent a transformation or incarnation by Mount Hua. As a result, he was bestowed the title of "Suyuan Yaopo Daming Zhenjun". In this role, he held responsibility for overseeing the world's treasures and hardware, including pottery casting pits, as well as the management of feathers and birds.

== Iconography ==
Xiyue Dadi is described as wearing a white robe emblazoned with the divine eye of Mount Hua and on his head a crown symbolizing the nine schools of the Tai Chu era. He carries the seal of Heavenly Communication of Truth, is mounted upon a white dragon, and leads a cavalcade of 4,100 heavenly officials and princesses..

== Monument ==
The Monument of the Xiyue Emperor, located in the eastern part of Kexian Village (可仙村), Xudaoxiang, Shaanxi, was erected during the 25th year of the Jiaqing reign in the Ming dynasty (1820). Constructed from bluestone, the monument has suffered some damage over time, with the head and body of the stele being incomplete and the seat lost. Despite this, it still stands at a height of 2.13 meters, with a width of 0.88 meters and a thickness of 0.20 meters.

The inscription on the monument, written in regular script, consists of 21 lines and 42 characters. It chronicles the act of sacrifice performed by the villagers of Kexian Village to honor the Xiyue Emperor. The monument serves as a historical record, preserving the memory of the villagers' reverence and devotion to the deity.

== Temple ==
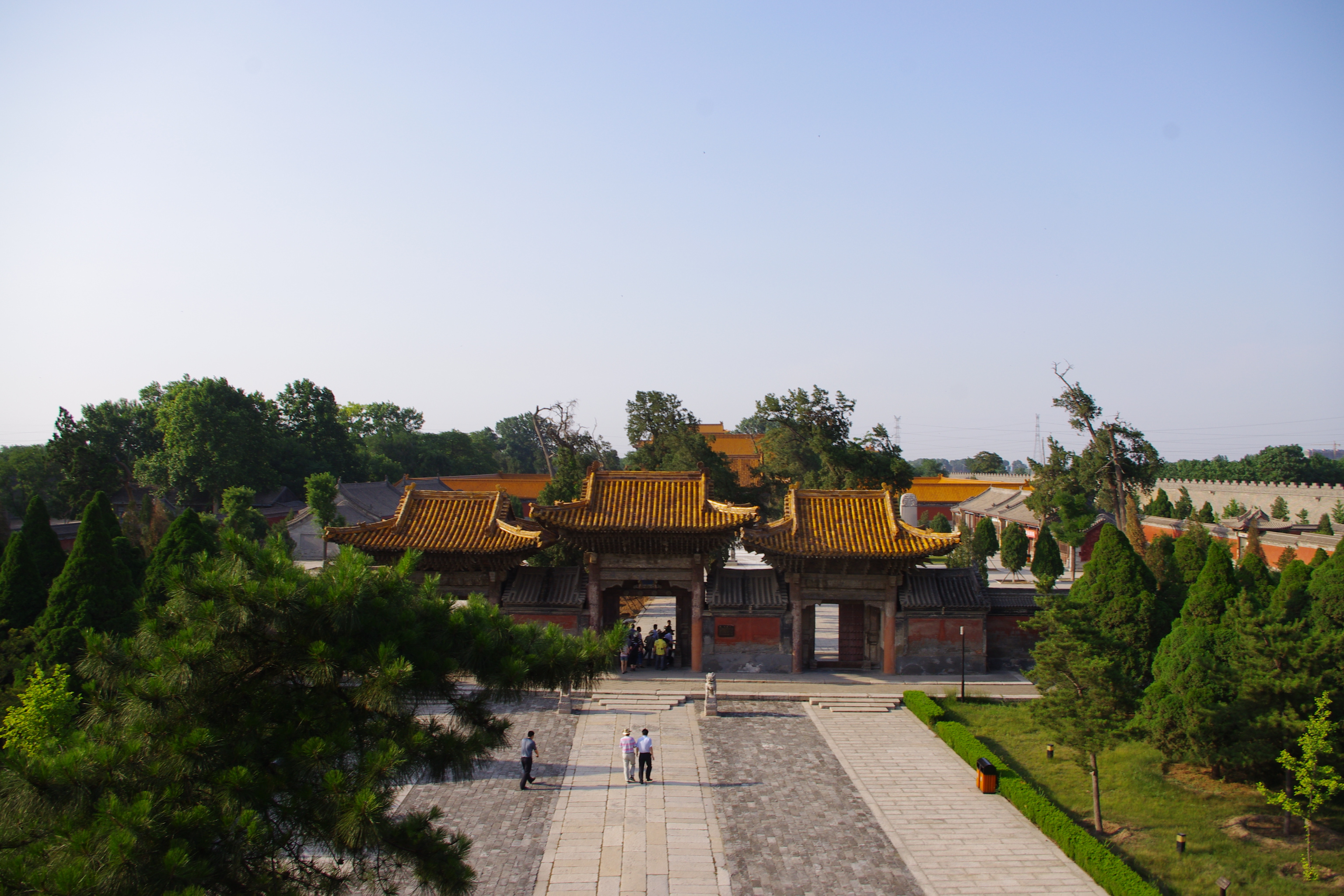
Entrance to the Xiyue Temple

The Xiyue Temple, situated on Yuezhen Street, 5 kilometers north of Mount Hua, is a revered temple dedicated to Xiyue Dadi. Its origins can be traced back to the reign of Emperor Wu during the Han dynasty, and over time, it developed into a significant site where rulers from various dynasties would come to pay homage and offer sacrifices to the God of Mount Hua.
