= Hebei opera =

Hebei opera may refer to these Chinese opera forms from Hebei province:

- Ping opera, originally from northern Hebei
- Hebei bangzi, originally from southern Hebei
