= Mount Hua =

Mountain in Shaanxi, China

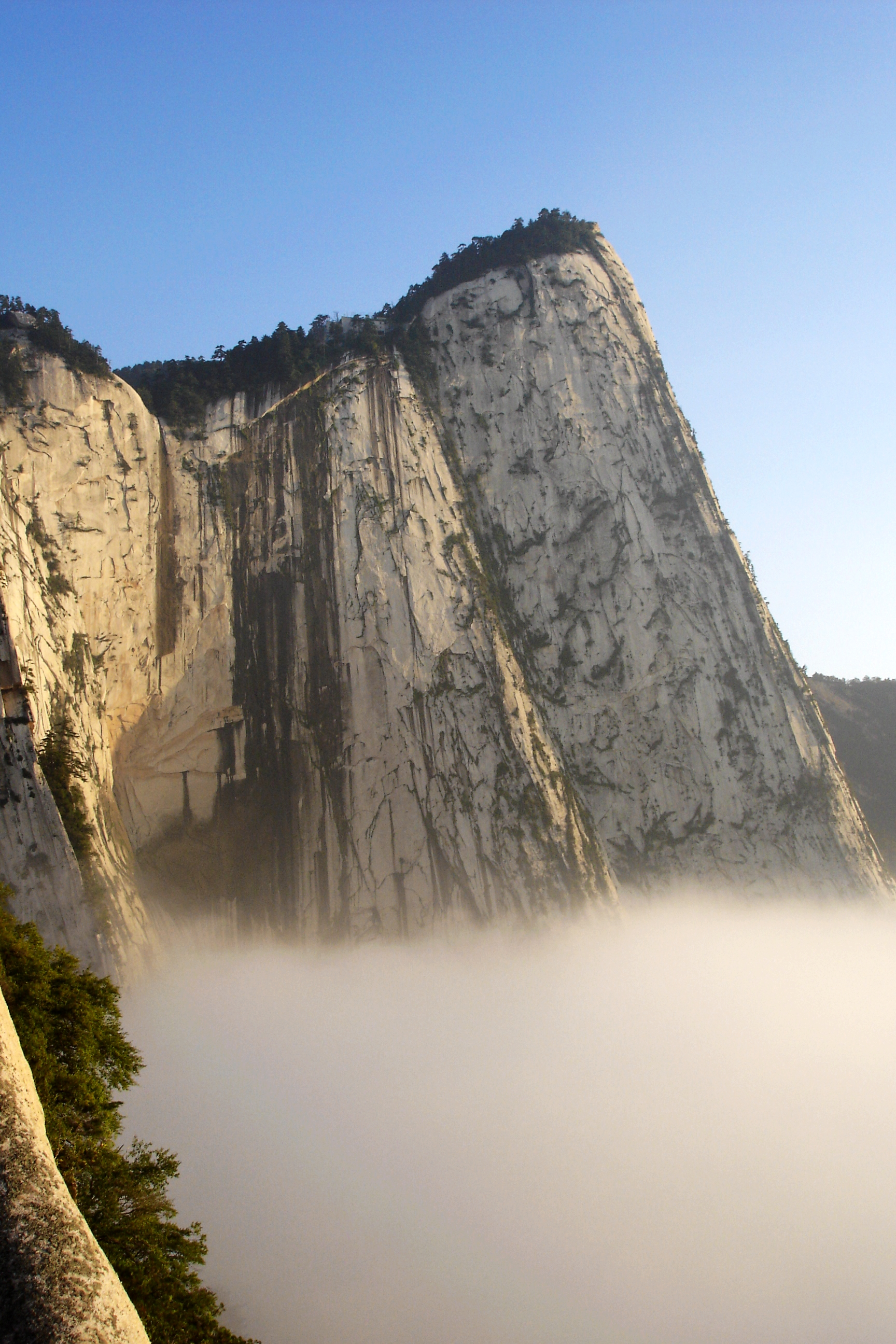
- Mount Hua's west peak

Highest point
- Elevation: 2,154 m (7,067 ft)
- Listing: Mountains of China
- Coordinates: 34°29′N 110°05′E

Geography
- Location within China
- Location: Huayin, Shaanxi, China
- Parent range: Qin Mountains

Climbing
- Easiest route: Cable car

Mount Hua
- "Mount Hua" in Simplified (top) and Traditional (bottom) Chinese
- Simplified Chinese: 华山
- Traditional Chinese: 華山
- Hanyu Pinyin: Huà Shān
Transcriptions
Standard Mandarin
- Hanyu Pinyin: Huà Shān
- Bopomofo: ㄏㄨㄚˋ ㄕㄢ
- Gwoyeu Romatzyh: Huah Shan
- Wade–Giles: Hua^{4} Shan^{1}
- Yale Romanization: Hwà Shān
- IPA: [xwâ ʂán]
Wu
- Romanization: Gho^{上} se^{平}
Yue: Cantonese
- Yale Romanization: Wah Sàan or Wah Sāan
- Jyutping: Waa6 Saan1
- IPA: [wa˨ san˥˧] or [wa˨ san˥]
Southern Min
- Hokkien POJ: Hôa-san
- Tâi-lô: Huâ-san

Mount Hua (simplified Chinese: 华山; traditional Chinese: 華山; pinyin: Huà Shān) is a mountain located near the city of Huayin in Shaanxi Province, about 120 kilometres (75 mi) east of Xi'an. It is the "Western Mountain" of the Five Great Mountains of China and has a long history of religious significance. Originally classified as having three peaks, in modern times it is classified as having five main peaks, the highest of which is the South Peak at 2,154.9 metres (7,070 ft).

== Names ==
Mount Hua is also called Huashan, its literal name, and nicknamed "Number One Steepest Mountain Under Heaven".

== Geography ==
Mount Hua is located near the southeast corner of the Ordos Loop section of the Yellow River basin, south of the Wei River valley, at the eastern end of the Qin Mountains, in Southern Shaanxi Province. It is part of the Qinling or Qin Mountains, which divide not only northern and southern Shaanxi, but also China.

=== Summits ===
Traditionally, only the giant plateau with its summits to the south of the peak Wuyun Feng (五雲峰, Five Cloud Summit) was called Taihua Shan (太華山, Great Flower Mountain). It could only be accessed through the ridge known as Canglong Ling (蒼龍嶺, Dark Dragon Ridge) until a second trail was built in the 1980s to go around Canglong Ling. Three peaks were identified with respective summits: the East, South and West peaks.

The East peak consists of four summits. The highest summit is Zhaoyang Feng (朝陽峰, Facing Yang Summit, i.e. the summit facing the sun). Its elevation is reported to be 2,096 m (6,877 ft) and its name is often used as the name for the whole East Peak. To the east of Zhaoyang Feng is Shilou Feng (石樓峰, Stone Tower Summit), to the south is Botai Feng (博臺峰, Broad Terrace Summit) and to the west is Yunü Feng (玉女峰}, Jade Maiden Summit). Today, Yunü Feng considered its own peak, most central on the mountain.

The South peak consists of three summits. The highest summit is Luoyan Feng (落雁峰, Landing Goose Summit), with an elevation of 2,154 m (7,067 ft). To the east is Songgui Feng (松檜峰, Pines and Junipers Summit) and to the west is Xiaozi Feng (孝子峰, Filial Son Summit).

The West peak has only one summit and it is known as Lianhua Feng (蓮花峰) or Furong Feng (芙蓉峰), both meaning Lotus Flower Summit. The elevation is 2,082 m (6,831 ft).

With the development of new trail to Hua Shan in the 3rd through to the 5th centuries along the Hua Shan Gorge. The peak immediately to the north of Canglong Ling, Yuntai Feng (雲臺峰, Cloud Terrace Peak), was identified as the North peak. It is the lowest of the five peaks with an elevation of 1,614.9 m (5,298 ft).

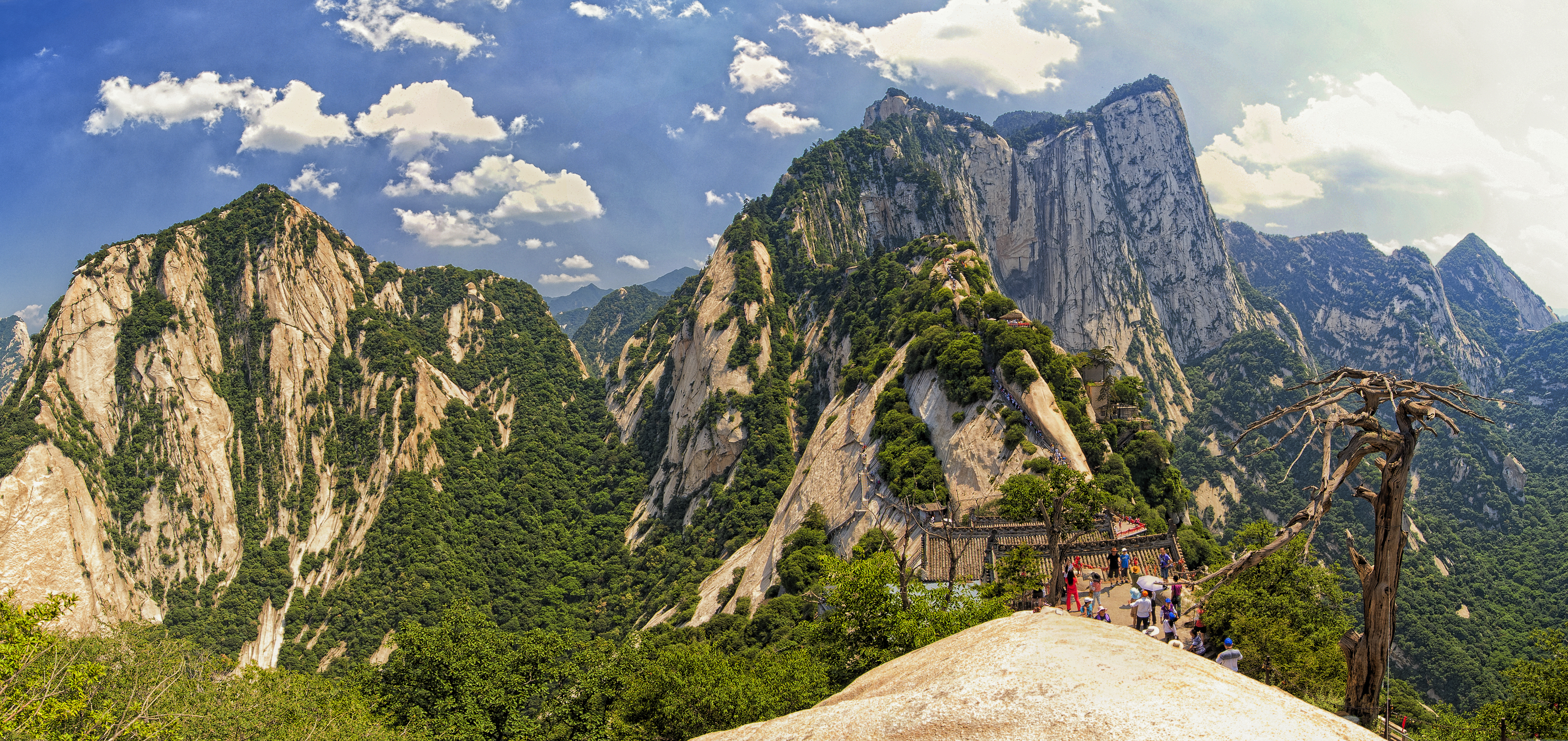
View from the North Peak

=== Climate ===
Mount Hua has a humid continental climate (Köppen climate classification Dwb). The average annual temperature in Mount Hua is 6.5 °C (43.7 °F). The average annual rainfall is 776.1 mm (30.56 in). July typically has the heaviest rainfall as well as the highest temperature, at around 17.8 °C (64 °F), while January is the coldest month, with an average temperature of around −5.7 °C (21.7 °F).

Climate data for Mount Hua, elevation 2,065 m (6,775 ft), (1991–2020 normals, extremes 1981–2010)
Month	Jan	Feb	Mar	Apr	May	Jun	Jul	Aug	Sep	Oct	Nov	Dec	Year
Record high °C (°F)	12.4 (54.3)	14.8 (58.6)	22.1 (71.8)	25.7 (78.3)	25.8 (78.4)	29.0 (84.2)	27.8 (82.0)	27.7 (81.9)	27.7 (81.9)	20.4 (68.7)	17.9 (64.2)	12.7 (54.9)	29.0 (84.2)
Mean daily maximum °C (°F)	−1.7 (28.9)	0.8 (33.4)	5.7 (42.3)	11.8 (53.2)	15.8 (60.4)	19.7 (67.5)	21.5 (70.7)	20.1 (68.2)	15.7 (60.3)	10.6 (51.1)	5.6 (42.1)	0.2 (32.4)	10.5 (50.9)
Daily mean °C (°F)	−5.6 (21.9)	−3.1 (26.4)	1.7 (35.1)	7.8 (46.0)	12.0 (53.6)	16.2 (61.2)	18.1 (64.6)	16.9 (62.4)	12.5 (54.5)	7.3 (45.1)	1.9 (35.4)	−3.7 (25.3)	6.8 (44.3)
Mean daily minimum °C (°F)	−8.4 (16.9)	−5.9 (21.4)	−1.3 (29.7)	4.5 (40.1)	8.9 (48.0)	13.3 (55.9)	15.5 (59.9)	14.4 (57.9)	10.1 (50.2)	4.7 (40.5)	−0.9 (30.4)	−6.6 (20.1)	4.0 (39.2)
Record low °C (°F)	−23.2 (−9.8)	−19.4 (−2.9)	−17.1 (1.2)	−10.4 (13.3)	−4.8 (23.4)	1.1 (34.0)	8.6 (47.5)	5.8 (42.4)	−0.6 (30.9)	−11.5 (11.3)	−18.5 (−1.3)	−24.3 (−11.7)	−24.3 (−11.7)
Average precipitation mm (inches)	13.2 (0.52)	17.1 (0.67)	31.8 (1.25)	48.1 (1.89)	77.2 (3.04)	79.9 (3.15)	144.6 (5.69)	118.3 (4.66)	105.4 (4.15)	66.4 (2.61)	30.1 (1.19)	8.8 (0.35)	740.9 (29.17)
Average precipitation days (≥ 0.1 mm)	7.1	7.5	8.4	8.4	10.6	9.9	13.4	11.9	11.9	9.7	7.3	5.8	111.9
Average snowy days	9.6	9.8	9.2	3.2	0.6	0	0	0	0.1	2.6	6.4	7.6	49.1
Average relative humidity (%)	56	59	58	56	59	63	74	77	73	66	58	54	63
Mean monthly sunshine hours	198.1	183.6	211.1	233.5	236.3	237.6	228.9	215.1	174.8	178.9	181.8	202.0	2,481.7
Percentage possible sunshine	63	59	57	59	55	55	52	52	48	52	59	66	56
Source: China Meteorological Administration

== History ==
As early as the 2nd century BC, there was a Daoist temple known as the Shrine of the Western Peak located at its base. Daoists believed that the mountain was inhabited by the god of the underworld and consequently the temple at its foot was often used by spirit mediums to contact this god and his underlings. Unlike Taishan, which became a popular place of pilgrimage, Huashan, because of the inaccessibility of its summits, only received Imperial and local pilgrims, and was not well visited by pilgrims from the rest of China. Mount Hua was also an important place for immortality seekers, because many Chinese medicinal plants grew (or were grown) there, and powerful drugs were reputed to be found there. Kou Qianzhi (365–448), the founder of the Northern Celestial Masters received revelations there, as did Chen Tuan (920–989), who spent the last part of his life in hermitage on the west peak. In the 1230s, all the temples on the mountain came under control of the Daoist Quanzhen School. In 1998, the management committee of Huashan agreed to turn over most of the mountain's temples to the China Daoist Association. This was done to help protect the environment, as the presence of taoists and nuns deters poachers and loggers.

The cult of Mount Hua experienced a significant flourishing, particularly during the Tang dynasty (618–907). This was a time when Mount Hua held great importance as it served as the midpoint along the road connecting the two capital cities of the dynasty, Chang'an and Luoyang. From the time of the Han dynasty (206 BC – 220 AD) onward, Mount Hua has been revered as one of China's five sacred mountains and has received offerings as the Western Marchmount. During the Tang dynasty, Emperor Xuanzong officially designated Mount Hua as the sacred mountain of the Tang royal family, bestowing upon its revered deity the prestigious title of the "King of the Metal Heavens".

Numerous renowned figures from Chinese history, including Qin Shihuang, Tang Taizong, and Sun Yat-sen, have visited Mount Hua. An ancient saying among Chinese scholars has been passed down through generations: "If you do not visit Huashan, you are not a true hero, and if you do not visit Huayue, your life is in vain." This saying reflects the esteemed status and profound influence of Mount Hua within Confucianism.

It is also seen as a sacred place in Taoism. As Ian Johnson wrote in an article exploring the search for Dao in China for The New York Review of Books, Mount Hua "is one of Daoism's five holiest sites, with near-vertical ascents that in the past were only accessible by stairs cut into the rock face and chains slung down as handrails."

== Legend ==
Legend has it that the mountain acquired its characteristic features when the god Juling Shen severed Mount Hua from the surrounding mountains with a single mighty blow of his axe. This act relocated the mountain to the other side of the Yellow River, creating a passageway for the river to flow into the sea. The supreme deity of Mount Hua is Xiyue Dadi. It was believed that Xiyue Dadi possessed the power to bring plentiful clouds and rain, nurture the growth of all things, grant blessings, and bring prosperity to the people. The god's third daughter, Huayue Sanniang, was known for her irresistible beauty and went against her father's wishes by marrying a mortal. In later centuries, the captivating tales of Huayue Sanniang's amorous adventures took on new forms and became known as the "Legend of Chenxiang" and "The Magic Lotus Lantern". Chenxiang, the central character, is the son of Huayue Sanniang and her mortal husband, Liu Xiang. Huayue Sanniang faced imprisonment beneath Mount Hua as punishment for violating the rules of Heaven. At the summit of Mount Hua's Western Peak stands a giant rock known as Axe-splitting Rock. Rising a hundred feet high and neatly split into three parts, it holds a significant place in legends. According to the tale, it was Chenxiang who, in a courageous attempt, split the rock to rescue his mother by separating the mountain.

== Temples ==
Huashan has a variety of temples and other religious structures on its slopes and peaks. At the foot of the mountains is the Cloister of the Jade Spring (玉泉院), which is dedicated to Chen Tuan. Additionally, atop the southernmost peak, there is an ancient Taoist temple which in modern times has been converted into a tea house.

The Xiyue Temple, situated on Yuezhen Street, 5 kilometres north of Mount Hua, is a revered temple dedicated to Xiyue Dadi. Its origins can be traced back to the reign of Emperor Wu during the Han dynasty, and over time, it developed into a significant site where rulers from various dynasties would come to pay homage and offer sacrifices to the God of Mount Hua.

== Ascent routes ==
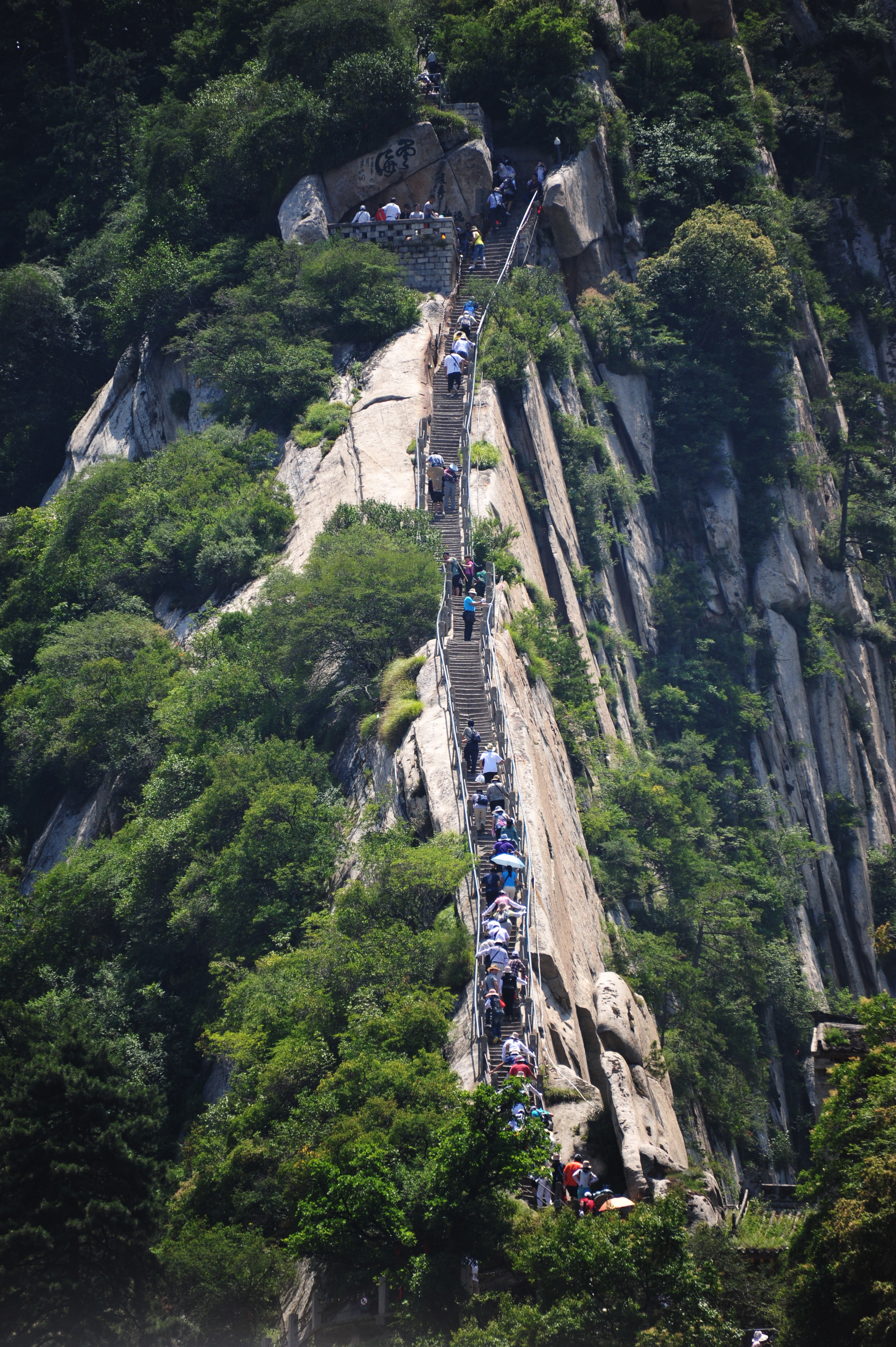
A portion of the Canglong Ling

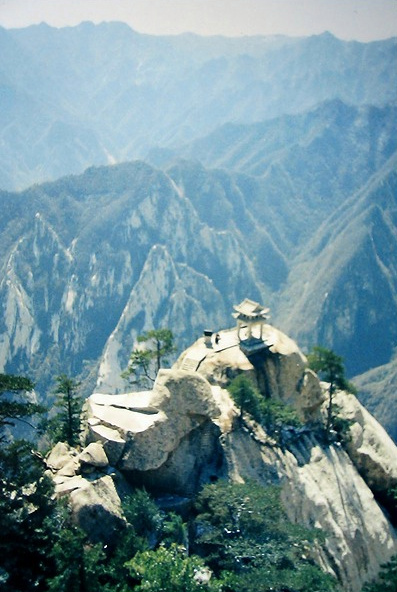
The chess pavilion, from the top of the East peak

There are three routes leading to Huashan's North Peak (1,614 m [5,295 ft]), the lowest of the mountain's five major peaks. The most popular is the traditional route in Hua Shan Yu (Hua Shan Gorge), first developed in the 3rd to 4th centuries AD and with successive expansion, mostly during the Tang dynasty. It winds for 6 km from Huashan village to the north peak. A new route in Huang Pu Yu (Huang Pu Gorge, named after the hermit Huang Lu Zi who lived in this gorge in the 8th century BC) follows the cable car to the North Peak, and is actually the ancient trail used prior to the Tang dynasty, which has since fallen into disrepair.

From the North Peak, a series of paths rise up to the Canglong Ling, which is a climb more than 300 m (984 ft) on top of a mountain ridge. This was the only trail to go to the four other peaks—the West Peak (2,038 metres [6,686 ft]), the Center Peak (2,042 m [6,699 ft]), the East Peak (2,100 m [6,900 ft]) and the South Peak (2,154.9 m)—until a new path was built to the east around the ridge in 1998.

== Hiking danger ==
The route up the mountain has been called one of the most dangerous hikes in the world.

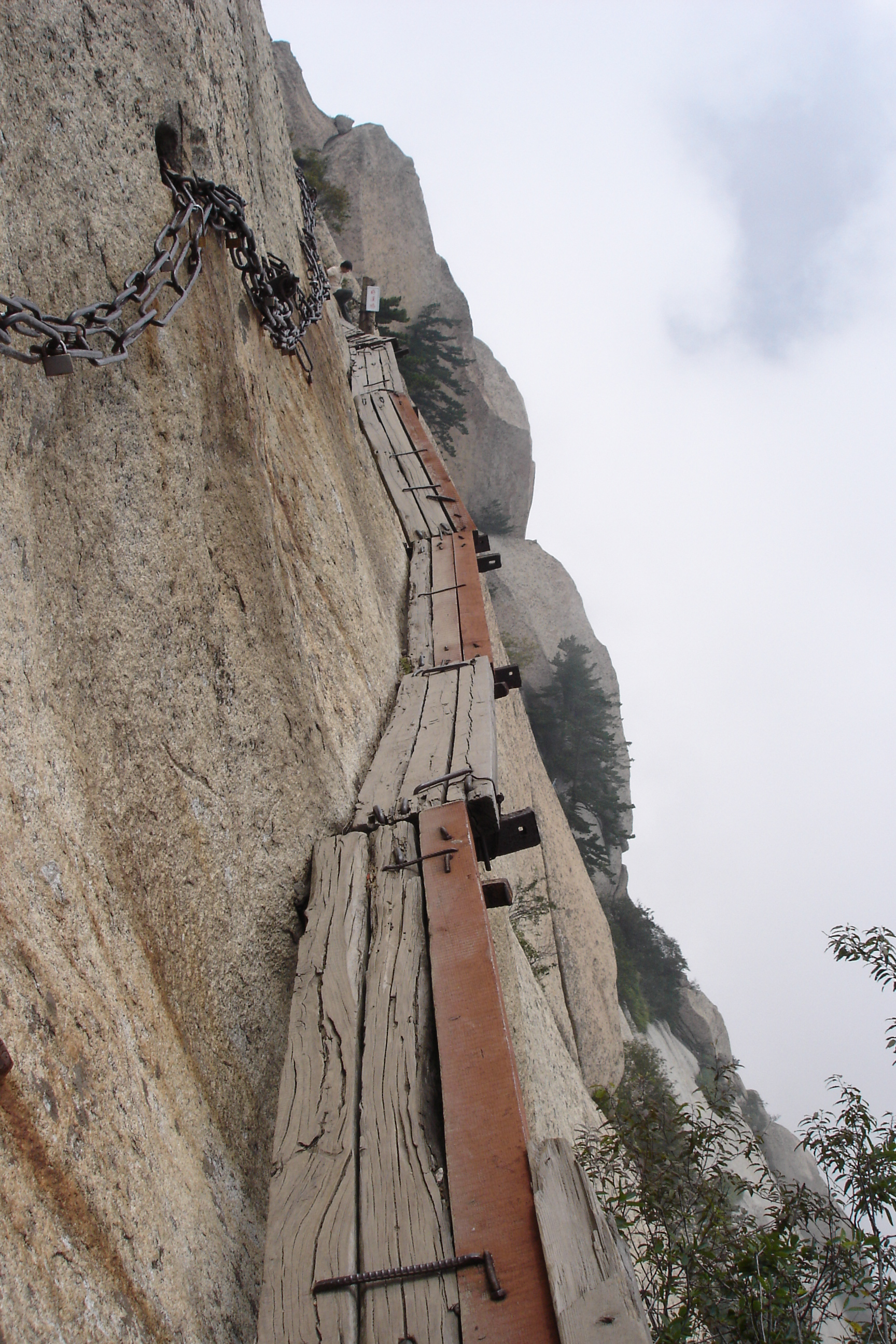
The Plank Walk (not part of the ascent)

As tourism has boomed and the mountain's accessibility vastly improved with the installation of the cable car in the 1990s, visitor numbers have surged. The many exposed, narrow pathways with precipitous drops gave the mountain a deserved reputation for danger, although safety measures—such as cutting deeper pathways, building up stone steps and wider paths, and adding railings—have to some extent mitigated the danger. The local government has opened new tracks and created one-way routes on some of the more dangerous parts so that, barring crowds and icy conditions, the mountain can be scaled without extreme risk now. Some of the most precipitous tracks have been closed off. The former trail leading along a cliff face from the North Peak to the South Peak was known as being extremely dangerous; there is now a new and safer stone-built path to the South Peak temple and on to the Peak itself.

Many Chinese still climb at nighttime, in order to reach the East Peak by dawn—though the mountain now has many hotels. This practice is a holdover from when it was considered safer to simply be unable to see the extreme danger of the tracks during the ascent, as well as to avoid meeting descending visitors at points where pathways have scarcely enough room for one visitor to pass through safely.

== See also ==
- Huaxia
- Mount Hua Sect
- CNS Huashan - Landing ship named after the mountain
- Four Mountains
