= Erlang Shen =

Deity in the Chinese pantheon

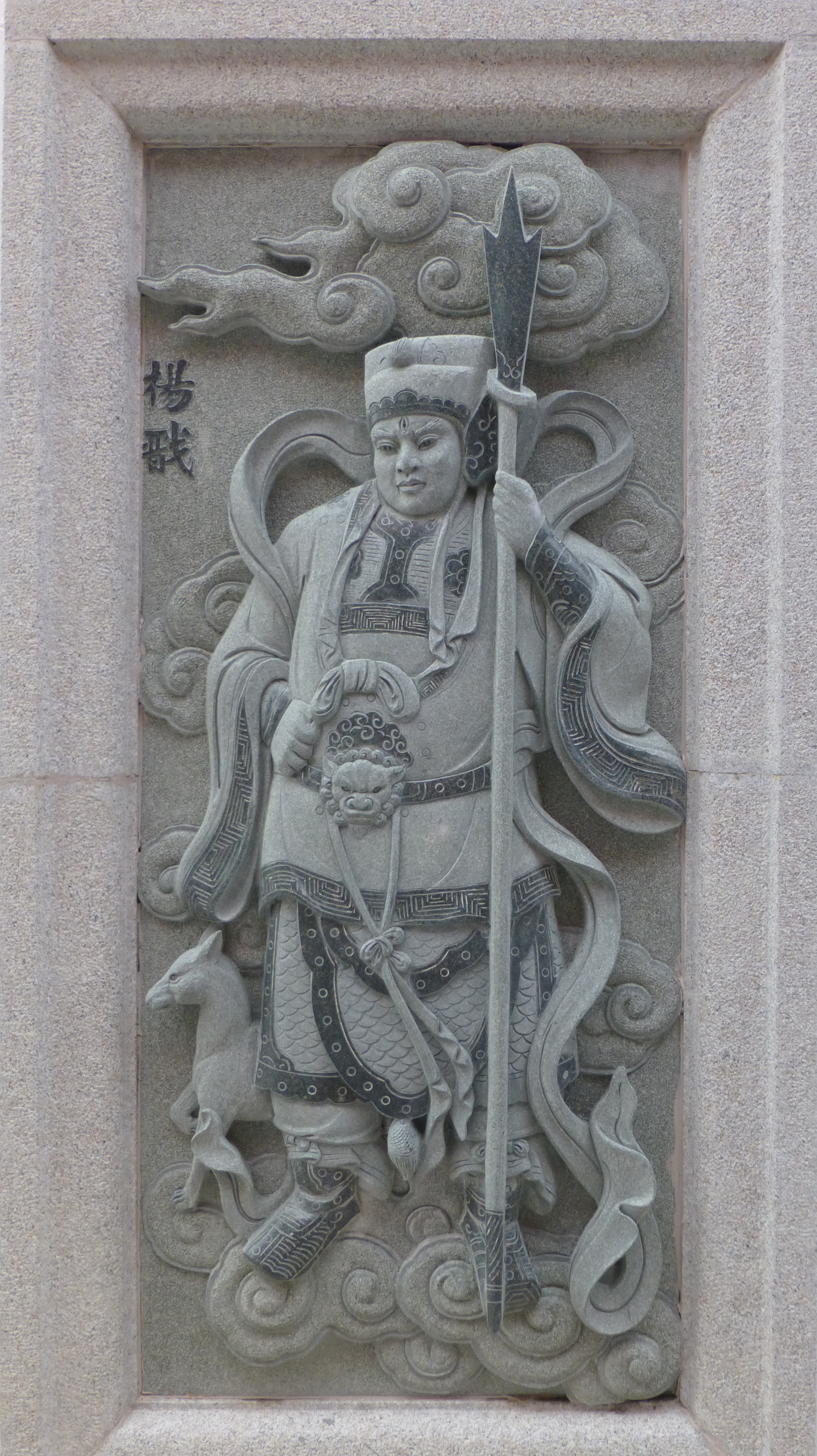
- Relief of Erlang at a temple in Perak, Malaysia

Chinese name
- Traditional Chinese: 二郎神
- Simplified Chinese: 二郎神
- Literal meaning: Second-Lad/Son God
Transcriptions
Standard Mandarin
- Hanyu Pinyin: Èrláng Shén
- Wade–Giles: Êrh-lang Shên

Vietnamese name
- Vietnamese alphabet: Nhị Lang Thần
- Chữ Hán: 二郎神

Korean name
- Hangul: 이랑진군 이랑신
- Hanja: 二郞眞君 二郎神
Transcriptions
- Revised Romanization: Irang Jingun; Irangsin
- McCune–Reischauer: Irang Jingun; Irangsin

Japanese name
- Kanji: 二郎神 顕聖二郎真君
- Hiragana: じろうしん けんせいじろうしんくん
- Katakana: ジロウシン ケンセイジロウシンクン
Transcriptions
- Romanization: Jirōshin; Kensei Jirō Shinkun

Erlang Shen, or simply Erlang, is a god in Chinese folk religion and Daoism, associated with water (flood control), justice, warriorhood, hunting, and demon subdual. He is commonly depicted as a young man with a third, truth-seeing eye in the middle of his forehead, wielding a three-pronged spear, and being accompanied by his loyal hunting dog, Xiaotian Quan.

The origin of Erlang is complex. He is most commonly believed to be the deification of Li Erlang, the second son of Li Bing, a hydraulic engineer of the Qin dynasty (221–206 BC). Later stories identify him as the deification of Yang Jian, the nephew of the legendary Jade Emperor. He is also identified with several other folk heroes associated with controlling floods.

In the Ming-era semi-mythical novels Investiture of the Gods and Journey to the West, Erlang Shen is the nephew of the Jade Emperor. In the former novel, he assists the Zhou army in defeating the Shang. In the latter, he is the second son of a mortal and the Jade Emperor's sister Yunhua, as well as an enemy-turned-ally of Sun Wukong. In his legends he is known as the greatest warrior god of heaven, and was a disciple of Yuding Zhenren, who taught him fighting and magical skills such as the 72 Earthly Transformations.

== Names ==
Erlang (Chinese: 二郎; pinyin: Èrláng; lit. 'Second Son/Boy/Lad/Male') is an ancient given name for boys. This stems from Li Erlang, the primary historical figure that Erlang is thought to be based on. Shen (Chinese: 神; pinyin: Shén) means "God".

Since Li Erlang was from Guankou, Sichuan, the god Erlang is also known by the epithets Chuanzhu (Chinese: 川主; pinyin: Chuānzhǔ; lit. 'Lord of Sichuan') and Guankou Erlang (Chinese: 灌口二郎; pinyin: Guànkǒu Èrláng; lit. 'Erlang of Guankou').

Other bynames of the deity include:

- Guanjiang Shen (Chinese: 灌江神; pinyin: Guànjiāng Shén; lit. 'God of Guan River')
- Xiansheng Erlang Zhenjun (Chinese: 顯聖二郎真君; pinyin: Xiǎnshèng Èrláng Zhēnjūn; lit. 'Sacred True Lord Erlang'), or just Erlang Zhenjun (Chinese: 二郎真君; pinyin: Èrláng Zhēnjūn; lit. 'True Lord Erlang')
- Shenyong Dajiangjun (Chinese: 神勇大將軍; pinyin: Shényǒng Dàjiàngjūn; lit. 'Great General of Divine Courage'), a title bestowed onto Erlang by Emperor Taizong of Tang, and later elevated to Chicheng Wang (Chinese: 赤城王; pinyin: Chìchéng Wáng; lit. 'Prince of Chicheng') by Emperor Xuanzong of the Tang dynasty
- Qingyuan Miaodao Zhenjun (Chinese: 清源妙道真君; pinyin: Qīngyuán Miàodào Zhēnjūn; lit. 'True Lord of the Marvelous Way of the Pure Source'), a title given by Emperor Zhenzong of the Northern Song dynasty
- Zhaohui Lingxian Wang (Chinese: 昭惠靈顯王; pinyin: Zhāohuì Língxiǎn Wáng)

== Depiction and powers ==
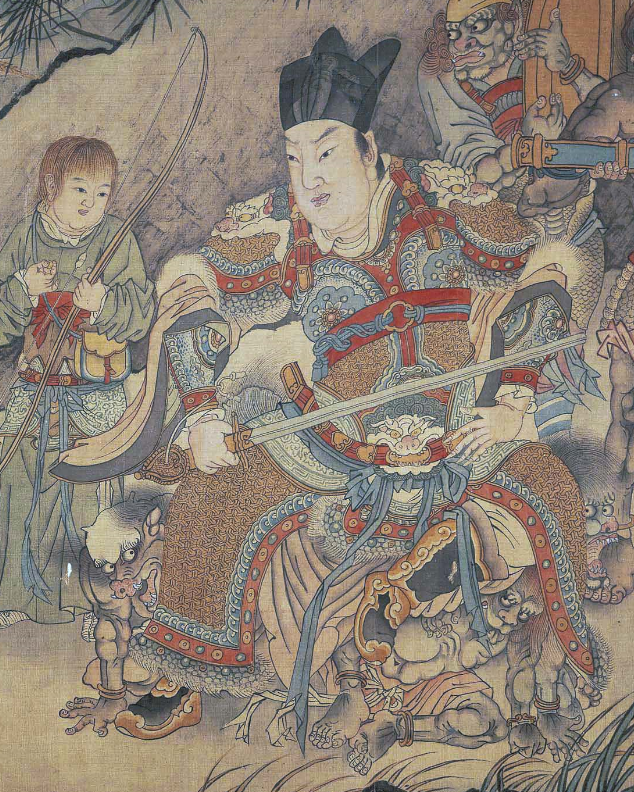
Erlang on a Soushan scroll, a genre of paintings depicting him searching the mountains for demons. Ming dynasty, 15th century

Erlang is usually portrayed as a young, handsome man with a three-pointed spear, though in older paintings he is sometimes portrayed as an older man with a beard and sword. He has a third eye in the middle of the forehead, sometimes called "Eye of Heaven" (Chinese: 天眼; pinyin: Tiānyǎn), which lets him see through deceptions, disguises, and transformations.

In Chinese mythology, Erlang Shen is associated with justice, warriorhood, and the subjugation of demons. According to legend, he possesses extraordinary strength, such as the ability to cleave a mountain in a single strike.

His main weapon is a spear called Sanjian Liangren Qiang (Chinese: 三尖兩刃槍; pinyin: Sānjiān Liǎngrèn Qiāng; lit. 'Three-Pointed Double-Edged Spear'), usually depicted as a flat, broad spear with three tips like a trident, and the two cutting edges of a saber. This bladed polearm is powerful enough to penetrate and cleave through steel and stone like wool.

Erlang is almost always accompanied by his faithful hunting dog, the Xiaotian Quan (Chinese: 嘯天犬; pinyin: Xiàotiān Quǎn; lit. 'Howling/Barking Celestial Dog'), which has the ability to viciously attack, maul, and subdue demons and evil spirits.

In some legends, Erlang possesses a unique ability known as the Jiuzhuan Xuangong (Chinese: 九轉玄功; pinyin: Jiǔzhuǎn Xuángōng; lit. 'Nine Turns Divine Skill'), which turns him nearly invincible against conventional weapons and most forms of magic. In the novel Investiture of the Gods, this ability turns him completely impervious to attacks from mystical weapons that have proven capable of injuring or even killing other immortals. Some stories state he is capable of 72 transformations (sometimes 73), meaning he can transform into virtually anything he wants.

In some folk beliefs, he was a filial son that entered Diyu, or hell, to save his deceased mother from torment. After being deified, he punishes unfilial children by striking them with thunder as a punishment, hence the traditional saying, "being smitten by lightning for being unfilial and ungrateful" towards unruly children.

== Origin ==
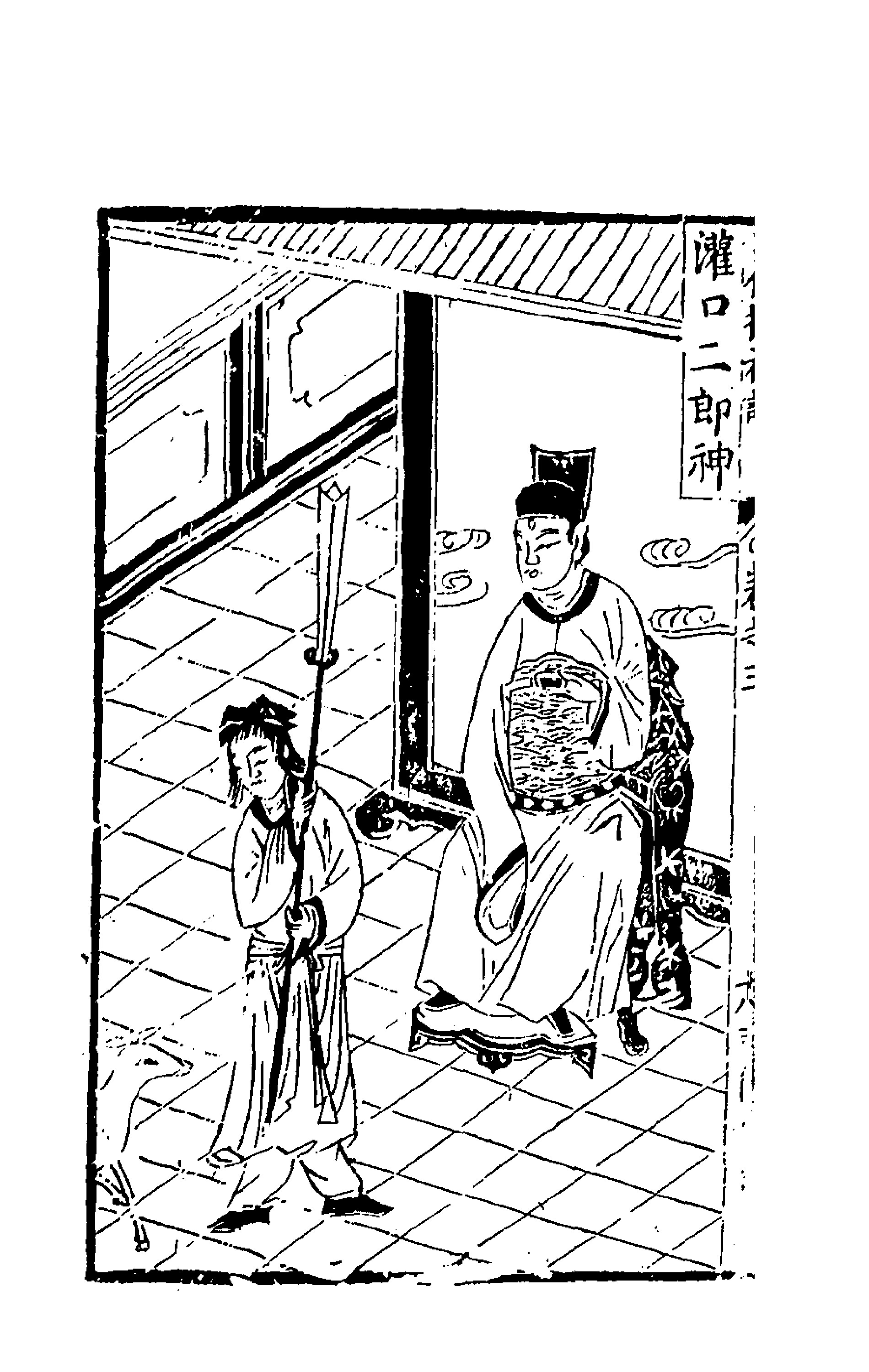
Erlang Shen of Guankou, from an illustrated Ming Dynasty edition of In Search of the Supernatural

Erlang's origin comes from a combination of historical and legendary figures. Generally, he is believed to be the deification of Li Erlang, the second son of Li Bing. However, he is also identified with several other folk heroes, which may have influenced his portrayal. He originated as a local god of Guankou, Sichuan, where Li Erlang was from. During the Northern Song dynasty (960–1127 CE), the cult of Erlang spread to the rest of China.

In later stories, Erlang is the deification of Yang Jian, son of the goddess Yunhua, and nephew of the legendary Jade Emperor. This portrayal as Yang Jian is most common in popular media.

=== As Li Erlang (李二郎) ===
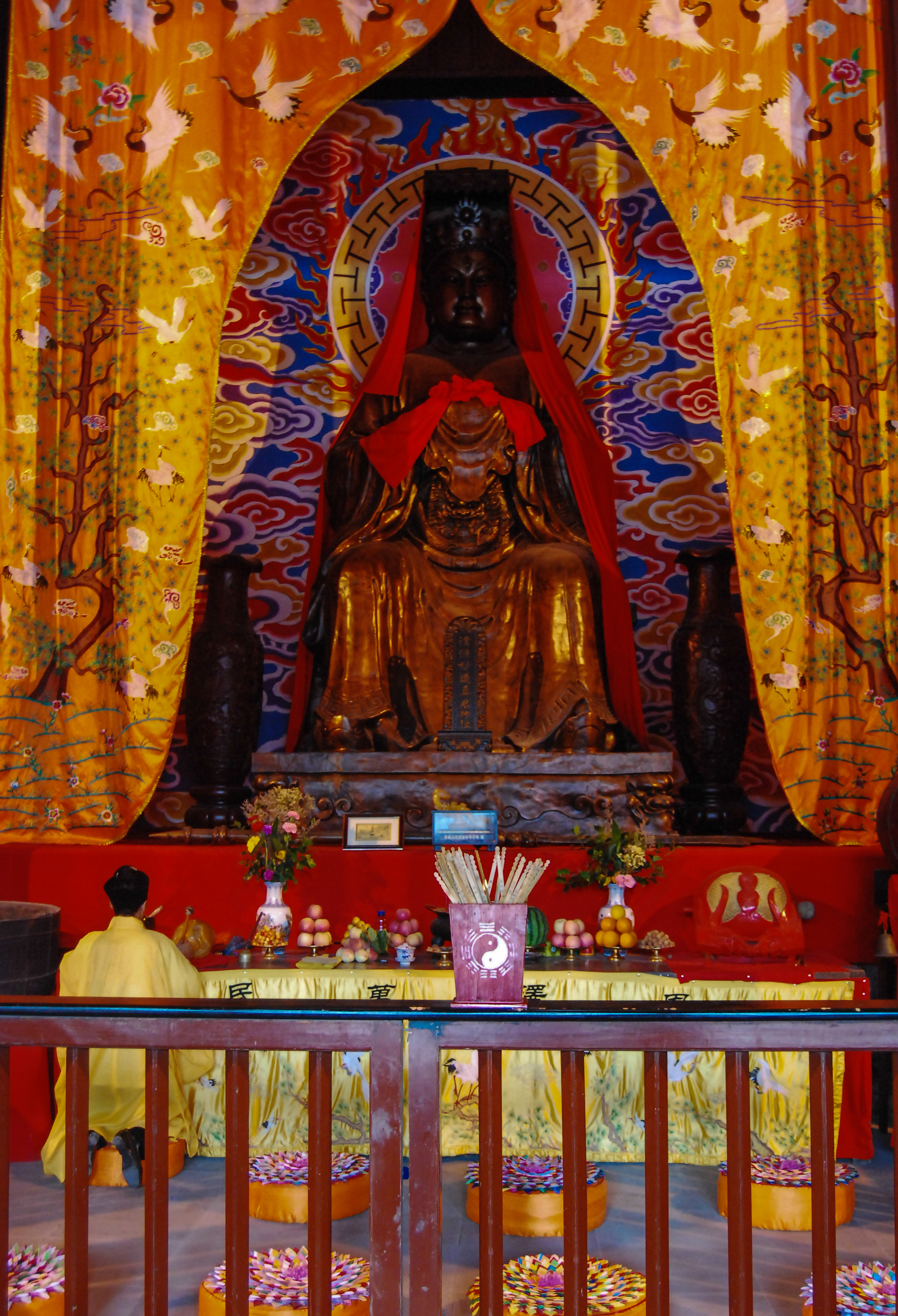
Statue of Erlang inside Erwang Temple, at Dujiangyan, Sichuan

Li Erlang was the second son of Li Bing, a hydraulic engineer from the Qin dynasty.

According to the "Story about Li Bing and His Son in Harnessing the Rivers" in the Records of Guansian, Li Erlang assisted his father in the construction of the complex irrigation system that prevented the Min River from flooding and irrigated the Chengdu Plain. In thanks for the prosperity that this brought to them, the local people elevated the father and son to gods and dedicated the Two Kings Temple in their honor.

Legend states that Li Bing sent his son out to discover the source of the flooding. He spent a year exploring the county without success. One day whilst sheltering in a cave, he encountered a tiger which he slew and seven hunters who had witnessed this bravery agreed to join him in his quest.

The group finally came to a cottage on the outskirts of Guan County (modern Dujiangyan City). From within they heard the sound of an old woman crying. The woman was Grandma Wang and she told them that her grandson was to be sacrificed to an evil dragon who was the local river god. Li Erlang reported this to his father who devised a plan to capture the dragon.

The eight friends hid in the River God Temple and jumped out on the dragon when it arrived to claim its offering. The dragon fled to the river pursued by Li Erlang, who eventually captured it. Grandma Wang arrived with an iron chain and the dragon was secured in the pool below the Dragon-Taming Temple, freeing the region from floods.

Another legend tells of Li Erlang suppressing a fire dragon that lived in the mountains north of Dujiangyan by climbing to the top of Mount Yulei, turning into a giant and building a dam with 66 mountains then filling it with water from Dragon Pacifying Pool.

=== As Li Bing (李冰) ===
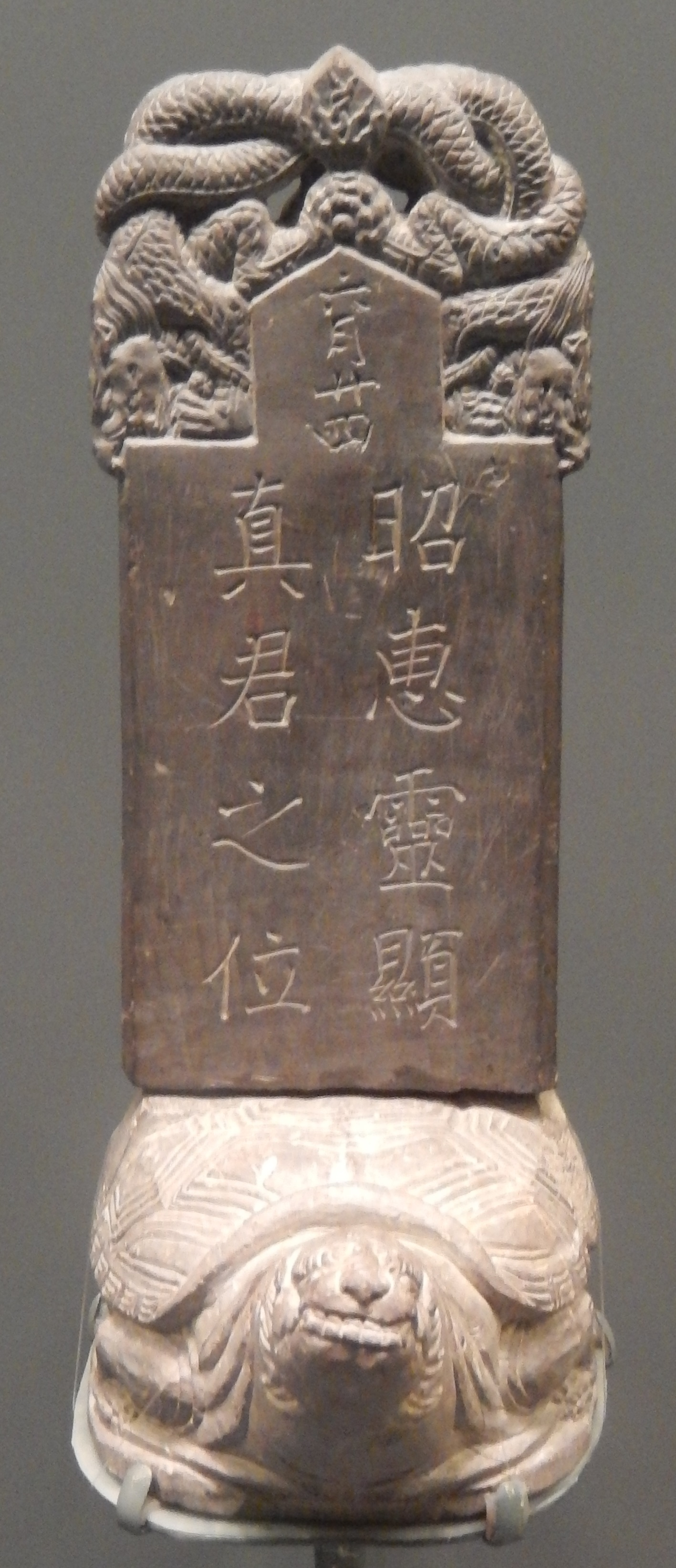
Stele dedicated to Erlang Shen, from Beijing, Yuan dynasty (1271–1368)

Li Bing himself has been thought of as inspiration for Erlang. For stopping the floods of the Min River by constructing Dujiangyan, he was turned into a folk hero who defeated a river god in order to save his prefecture from being flooded. He was then portrayed as the new river god that protected the local people in the area from floods. However, a discrepancy comes up that even though Li Bing/Erlang was known as Guankou Shen, the river that he is associated with is in Qianwei and not Guankou. Another discrepancy is that Li Erlang had never appeared in any of the tales related to stopping the Min River. The first appearance of Li Erlang was in Zhishui ji (治水記) by Li Ying (李膺) of the Liang dynasty (502–557 CE).

Historically, Li Bing was conferred an official title until the Five Dynasties period under the rule of the Shu kingdom. He rose to political power when the great flood that occurred on the twenty-sixth day of the eighth month in 920 AD was reported to the emperor by Daoist Du Guangting.

=== As Yang Jian (楊戩) ===
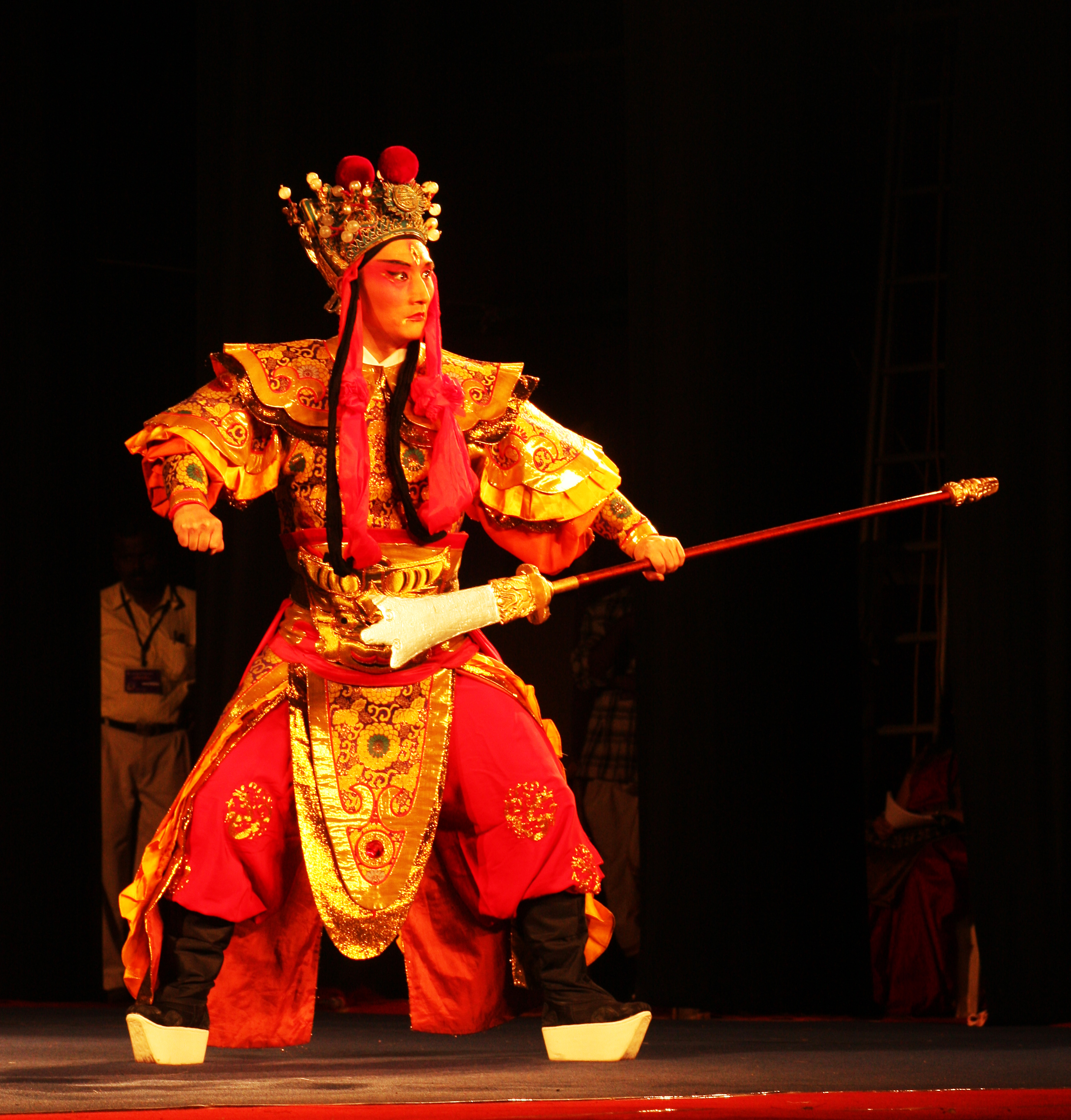
Erlang Shen portrayed by a Beijing opera actor

Many legends and novels describe Erlang as Yang Jian, a nephew of the Jade Emperor. According to an ancient text, Erlang Baojuan, Yang Jian's mother was Princess Yunhua, the Jade Emperor's sister, who was imprisoned under Mount Tao because she violated the Heavenly Rules by marrying a human named Yang Tianyou. Many years later, her son Yang Jian cleaved Mount Tao using his axe, hoping to set his mother free. He did successfully rescue his mother after he chased away the sun by carrying a mountain on his back.

In the Tang dynasty story The Magic Lotus Lantern, Erlang's mother, Princess Yunhua, was the goddess of the realm of desire in heaven. Her job was to limit the gods' mortal urges such as love, affection, greed, and ambition. When she pursued an evil dragon who broke free of its heavenly prison into the mortal realm and was injured by it, she fell in love with Yang Tianyou, a mortal scholar, who saved her life by giving her his own heart to replace the one the dragon damaged. They had three children: Yang Jiao, Yang Jian (Erlang Shen), and Yang Chan (Holy Mother of Mount Hua). When the Jade Emperor discovered her marriage, he sent his armies to kill her family and capture her. Only Erlang and his sister Yang Chan survived.

In order to rescue his mother, Yang Jian became a disciple of Yuding Zhenren at Jinxia Cave in Yuquan Mountain. By the age of seventeen, he had cultivated powerful abilities that allowed him to stand proudly in the world. His martial skills progressed remarkably, especially after he obtained the Three-Pointed Two-Edged Blade. Driven by his deep desire to save his mother, he used his blade to split open Peach Mountain and rescued her. This legend has also become an important origin for the "filial piety" culture along the banks of the Guan River.

In the Ming dynasty novel Investiture of the Gods (1605), it is mentioned that Princess Longji is the Jade Emperor's daughter, making her Yang Jian's cousin. The Golden Fleece Lads are his disciples.

=== Other identifications ===
Erlang Shen is also identified with Zhao Yu, a hermit who lived on Mount Qingcheng and was appointed by Emperor Yang of Sui as Governor of Jiazhou. Zhao Yu is said to have set forth with 1000 men to defeat a flood dragon that had been tormenting the area. Upon reaching the river, Zhao Yu dived into the water with his double-edged sword and emerged holding the dragon's head. Following his death, according to the Chronicle of Changshu County, the region was once again plagued by flood and he was seen riding a white horse amidst the swirling currents. The locals built a temple enshrining Zhao Yu as the god Erlang and the floods were subdued.

Deng Xia is said to have been a general under Erlang who surpassed his predecessors in valor and defeated a flood dragon, receiving the title "Erlang Shen" and a temple in his honor at Zhongqingli in Hangzhou.

== Representation in Chinese culture as Yang Jian (楊戩) ==
=== Fengshen Yanyi ===
In Investiture of the Gods, Yang Jian (Yang Bliss) is a disciple of Yuding Zhenren, and he learned fighting and magical skills including the 72 earthly transformations. He first appeared during the time of the Diablo Brothers' attack on the Western Foothills. After hearing of the situation, Yang personally took the offensive against the brothers. During his duel against all four brothers, Yang deliberately allowed himself to be consumed by Diablo Long Life's flying mink (some sources say an elephant). Following the battle, Yang Jian suddenly reappeared before Jiang Ziya after killing the mink inside its stomach with his many transformations. To trick the Diablo Brothers, Yang Jian later transformed himself into Long Life's flying mink and stole Diablo Red's Havoc-Umbrella. Thus, Yang was renowned as the true reason for Jiang Ziya's victory over the Diablo Brothers at an overall point.

The Seven Monsters of Meishan are the main adversaries of Yan Jian and were summoned from their home on Mount Mei to help defend Mengjin Pass on behalf of the Shang dynasty against the advancing Zhou army. With their formidable magical powers and demonic abilities, they inflict heavy losses on the Zhou forces, defeating several of its generals. Because they are highly cultivated demons, ordinary weapons often fail to kill them permanently. However, Yang Jian's third eye, known as the "Eye of Heaven", allows him to see through their disguises and perceive their true forms. He then systematically defeats them by exploiting the natural weaknesses of their original animal forms.

=== Journey to the West ===
Erlang makes an appearance near the start of the classic Journey to the West by Wu Cheng'en. Erlang, who is titled as being either True Lord or Illustrious Sage, is the nephew of the Jade Emperor. Erlang made his first appearance when he had been ordered by the Jade Emperor (in which Erlang was also with his seven elite sages whom he called his brothers) to subdue Sun Wukong, who was to be punished for his havoc in heaven.

His bearing was refined, his visage noble, His ears hung down to his shoulders, and his eyes shone. The hat on his head had three peaks and phoenixes flying, And his robe was of a pale goose−yellow. His boots were lined with cloth of gold; dragons coiled round his socks; His jade belt was decorated with the eight jewels, At his waist was a bow, curved like the moon, In his hand a Three-Pointed Double-Edged Spear. His axe had split open Peach Mountain when he rescued his mother, His bow had killed the twin phoenixes of Zongluo. Widespread was his fame for killing the Eight Demons, And he had become one of Plum Hill's seven sages. His heart was too lofty to acknowledge his relatives in Heaven; In his pride he went back to be a god at Guanjiang. He was the Merciful and Miraculous Sage of the red city, Erlang, whose transformations were numberless.

— Description from Journey to the West, Wu Cheng'en

Throughout the course of Erlang's duel between Sun Wukong, it was proven that they are equally matched. After many transformations that were performed in their duel (Sun Wukong fleeing as a fish; Erlang and Sun Wukong becoming larger birds, and so forth), near the conclusion of the battle, he managed to see through Sun Wukong's disguise (as a temple) using his third eye and with the assistance of another God. It should be noted, however, that Wukong fleeing was for his monkeys' safety. Erlang eventually captured Wukong through teamwork with several other gods; Laozi personally had dropped his refined golden ring that had hit Sun Wukong on the head, giving Erlang a chance to bring him down, and Erlang's dog bit him in the leg. After Sun Wukong had been captured (to which Sun Wukong retorts that they are cowards for attacking from behind), he and his heavenly soldiers would burn areas of Mount Huaguo. Erlang is seen again far later in the novel when he assists Sun Wukong and Zhu Bajie through chance by fighting against an ancient Dragon King and his villainous son-in-law, a nine-headed bird demon. Wukong also mentions being sworn brothers with Erlang Shen. Erlang has six other sworn brothers known as the Six Sages of Meishan from Plum Mountain (Meishan).

=== Bao Lian Deng ===
In the tale Lotus Lantern (Bao Lian Deng), Erlang had a sister known as the Holy Mother of Mount Hua (Hua Shan). She married a mortal man, Liu Yanchang, who was a scholar. Together, they had a son by the name of Chenxiang. Erlang had to seal her because she violated the laws of heaven by having a relationship with a mortal. When Chenxiang came of age, he defeated Erlang and split the mountain with an axe to free his mother, mirroring how Erlang has split Mount Tao to free his own mother.

== In popular culture ==
Erlang is also introduced as a resplendent, powerful god in Kevin Hearne's Scourged, book 9 of The Iron Druid Chronicles.

Yang Jian/Erlang Shen in film and television
Year	Country	Title	Type	Yang Jian/Erlang Sheng actor
1964	China	Uproar In Heaven 大鬧天宮	Animated Film	Yu Ding
1986	China	Journey to the West 西游记	Television series	Lin Zhiqian
1996	Hong Kong	Journey to the West 西游记	Television series	Joe Ma
1998	Singapore	Legend of the Eight Immortals 东游记	Television series	Wang Yanbin
1999	China	Lotus Lantern 宝莲灯	Animated film	Jiang Wen
2005	China	Lotus Lantern 宝莲灯	Television series	Vincent Chiao
2006	China	The Legend and the Hero 封神榜之凤鸣岐山	Television series	Han Dong
2009	China	Prelude of Lotus Lantern 宝莲灯前传	Television series	Vincent Chiao
2009	China	The Legend and the Hero 2	Television series	Han Dong
2010	China	Journey to the West 西游记	Television series	Yin Xiaotian
2011	China	Journey to the West 西游记	Television series	Feng Shaofeng
2014	Hong Kong China	The Monkey King 西游记之大闹天宫	Film	Peter Ho
2016	Hong Kong China	League of Gods 3D封神榜	Film	Huang Xiaoming
2017	China	A Chinese Odyssey: Love of Eternity 大话西游之爱你一万年	Television series	Hu Yunhao
2018	China	The Taoism Grandmaster 玄门大师	Television series	Han Dong
2019	China	The Gods 封神	Television series	Luo Jin
2020	China	Heroic Journey of Nezha 哪咤降妖记	Television series	Gao Ziqi
2022	China	New Gods: Yang Jian 新神榜：杨戬	Animated Film	Wang Kai
2023	China	Creation of the Gods I: Kingdom of Storms 封神第一部：朝歌风云	Film	Ci Sha

- Erlang is featured as a boss in the Game Science 2024 video game Black Myth: Wukong, voiced by Zhang Jie in Mandarin and Andrew Koji in English.

== See also ==
- Dog in Chinese mythology
- Jiro (given name)
- Rama
- Black Myth: Wukong
- Mount Erlang
