= Zhuozhou World Studios =

- Traditional Chinese: 涿州影視城
- Simplified Chinese: 涿州影视城
Transcriptions
Standard Mandarin
- Hanyu Pinyin: Zhuózhōu Yǐngshìchéng

Zhuozhou World Studios is one of the biggest film studio in China and one of the largest movie studios in Asia. It is located in Zhuozhou city, Hebei province. It is known as "East Hollywood". The movie studio is operated by the privately owned China Central Television. It was founded in August 1990 and covers a total area of 2197.3 mu. Many Chinese historical television series shot the scene in here, such as Tang Ming Huang, Romance of the Three Kingdoms, Palace of Desire, A Step into the Past, The Empress of China, Journey to the West and The Water Margin.

The Liyuan multi-function hall imitating Tanglou style can accommodate 600 people at the same time. There are 100 beds in the Bamboo Garden Hotel, which imitates the Ming Dynasty courtyard building. There are 80 beds in Taoyuan Hospitality, which imitates the Qing Dynasty courtyard building. The modern plum garden is equipped with central air conditioning and has 120 beds.
