= Lotus Lantern =

1999 Chinese animated film

- Film poster
- Directed by: Chang Guangxi
- Written by: Wang Dawei
- Produced by: Sheng Chongqing
- Starring: Jiang Wen; Xu Fan; Ning Jing; Chen Peisi
- Edited by: Gong Liming
- Music by: Jin Fuzai
- Production company: Shanghai Animation Film Studio
- Release date: 30 July 1999
- Running time: 85 minutes
- Country: China
- Language: Mandarin
- Budget: RMB 12 million

Lotus Lantern (Chinese: 宝莲灯; pinyin: Bǎo lián dēng) is a Chinese animated feature film based on the Chinese fairy tale The Magic Lotus Lantern, produced by Shanghai Animation Film Studio.

== Story ==
The story is based on the traditional Chinese folklore about a boy named Chenxiang. His mother, Sanshengmu, is a goddess, and his father, Liu Yanchang, was a mortal. Since their marriage was forbidden, his maternal uncle, Erlang Shen, who was a god, punishes them by killing Liu Yanchang. Sanshengmu escapes and gives birth, but Chen Xiang grows up without knowledge of his ancestry. Sanshengmu possesses a magical Lotus Lantern whose light can scare away evil. When Erlang Shen, a strict and powerful god, kidnaps Chen Xiang, Sanshengmu fights to save him.

Unfortunately, Erlang Shen is victorious and Chen Xiang is forced to live in his palace on the sacred mountains. Erlang Shen then imprisons Sanshengmu beneath a mountain for her crimes. Although he is quite young, Chen Xiang manages to escape from the palace, taking the magical lotus lantern that Sanshengmu lost during the battle.

After surviving adventures with many beloved characters of Chinese mythology, Chen Xiang finally matures into a courageous young man who must battle Erlang Shen to win Sanshengmu's freedom and fall in love at the same time.

== Main characters ==
- Chenxiang: Half-god boy. His mother is a goddess and his father is a mortal. He gets through tons of adventures to win his mother's freedom from his uncle Er langshen.
- Sanshengmu: Powerful Goddess who possesses a magical lotus lantern. She fell in love with a mortal and gave birth to Chenxiang. For which she is imprisoned beneath Hua Mountain.
- Er-lang Shen: Er-lang Shen may be a deified version of several semi-mythical folk heroes who help regulate China's torrential floods, dating variously from the Qin, Sui and Jin dynasties. A later Buddhist source identify him as the second son of the Northern Heavenly King Vaishravana.

== See also ==
- Coco Lee
- List of animated feature films
