= Yuding Zhenren =

Taoist immortal and character in Fengshen Yanyi

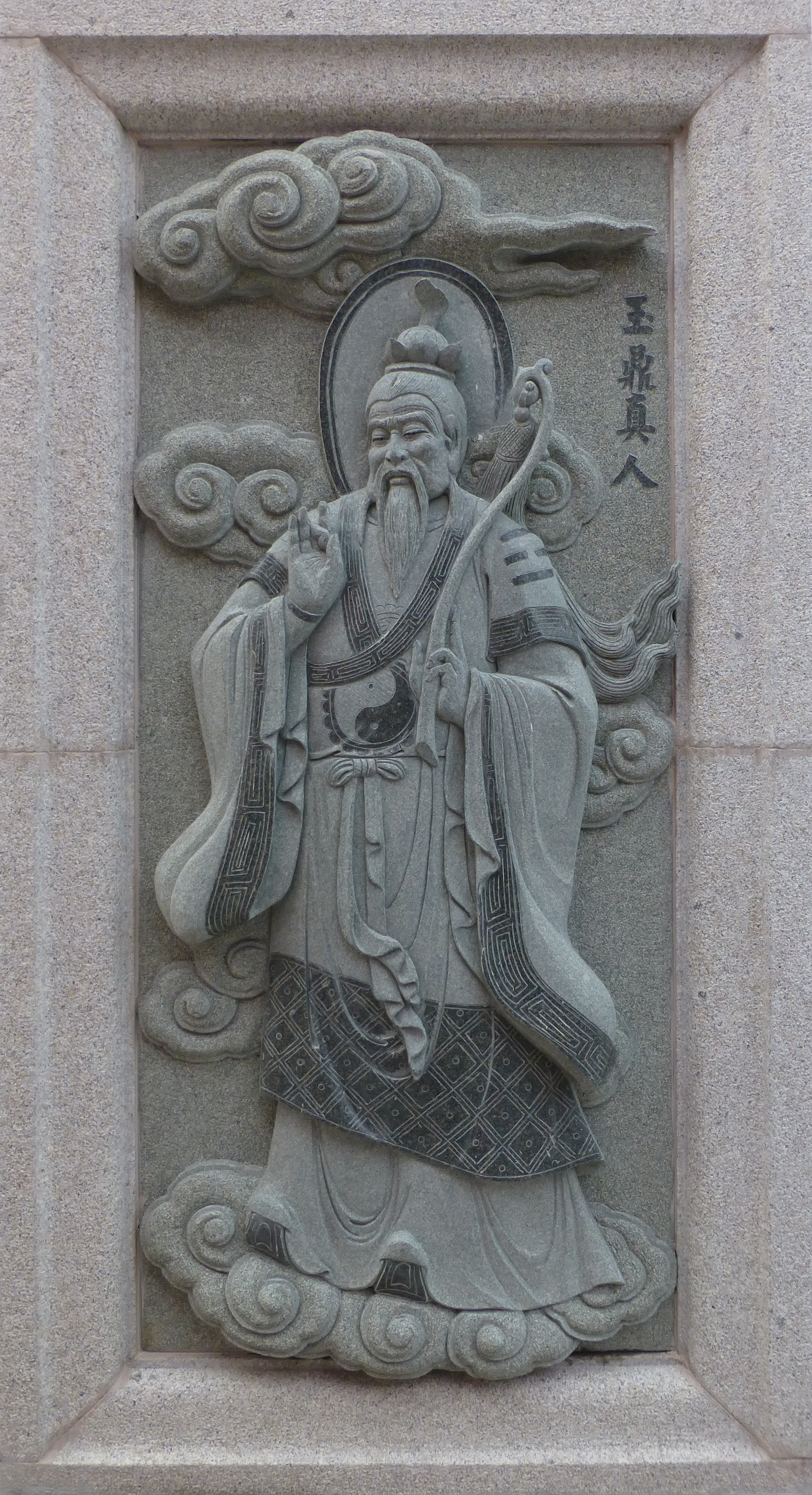
Yuding Zhenren

Yuding Zhenren (Chinese: 玉鼎真人) is a Taoist immortal in the Chinese novel Fengshen Yanyi. He is one of the Twelve Golden Immortals under Yuanshi Tianzun and the teacher of Yang Jian. He lives in Jinxia Cave (金霞洞) on Yuquan Mountain (玉泉山).

== Role in the novel ==
Yuding Zhenren is a member of the Chan Sect (阐教) and helps Jiang Ziya in the war against the Shang dynasty. His disciple Yang Jian fights for the Western Zhou army and often seeks his advice at Jinxia Cave. Yang Jian has mastered the Eight-Nine Mystical Skill (八九玄功), which allows him to change his form and survive attacks that would kill ordinary people.

During the fighting at Xiqi, Yuding is wounded by Zhao Gongming's Dinghai Pearls (定海珠), along with several other immortals. He later sends Yang Jian to rescue Huanglong Zhenren, whom Zhao Gongming has captured and hung from a banner. Yang Jian changes into a flying ant, removes the seal holding Huanglong's spirit, and helps him escape.

Yuding later helps defend Xiqi against Lü Yue and his disciples. He fights Zhu Tianlin (朱天麟) and kills him with his Zhanxian Sword (斩仙剑). He then joins Yang Jian and Nezha in their fight against Lü Yue.

When the Zhou army is struck by smallpox, Yuding and Huanglong Zhenren send Yang Jian to Fire Cloud Cave (火云洞) to ask the Three Sovereigns for help. Yang Jian returns with medicine for Jiang Ziya and the soldiers. Yuding gives the medicine to Jiang Ziya, while Yang Jian and Nezha help distribute it among the army. The soldiers recover from the disease.

Yuding also helps break the Immortal-Slaying Sword Formation (诛仙阵) set up by Tongtian Jiaozhu. Yuanshi Tianzun gives four of his disciples the task of removing the swords from the formation. Yuding takes the Xianxian Sword (陷仙剑), while Guangchengzi, Chijingzi, and Daoxing Tianzun take the other three swords. The formation is then broken. Yuding later joins the other immortals in the battle against the Ten Thousand Immortals Formation (万仙阵).

Near the end of the war, Yang Jian returns to Jinxia Cave for help against Gao Ming and Gao Jue, two spirits from Qipanshan (棋盘山). Yuding tells him that they are a peach tree spirit and a willow tree spirit. They draw their powers from the statues of Thousand-Li Eye and Wind-Following Ear at the nearby Yellow Emperor Temple. He advises Yang Jian to destroy the trees and statues to defeat them.

== Later traditions ==
In later stories about Erlang Shen, Yuding is also the teacher of Yang Jian, the son of the goddess Yunhua. After Yunhua is imprisoned beneath Peach Mountain, Yang Jian studies under Yuding at Jinxia Cave. He later splits the mountain to rescue his mother.

The Qing dynasty Yuquan Zhi (玉泉志) also records the story of Yuding and Yang Jian. It places Jinxia Cave at the foot of Fuchuan Mountain (覆船山) and connects the cave with Yang Jian's training under Yuding.

== Religious sites ==
Jinxia Cave (金霞洞) on Yuquan Mountain in Dangyang, Hubei, is said to be the place where Yuding Zhenren taught Yang Jian. The cave is mentioned in the Yuquan Si Zhi (玉泉寺志), which places it near the end of Fuchuan Mountain (覆船山). The name Jinxia refers to the coloured clouds said to appear around the cave. The cave is still shown to visitors as the home of Yuding Zhenren in Fengshen Yanyi.

Yuding Zhenren is also worshipped at Qingyang Palace in Chengdu, Sichuan. The Sanqing Hall contains statues of the Twelve Golden Immortals, including Yuding, on both sides of the Three Pure Ones. The hall was rebuilt in 1669 during the Qing dynasty.

== In media ==
Yuding Zhenren appears as an antagonist in the 2022 animated film New Gods: Yang Jian. He is voiced by Li Lihong in the Chinese version and Parry Shen in the English dub.

Yuding Zhenren is played by Wang Jun (王骏) in the 2009 television series The Prelude of Lotus Lantern. In this version, he is also the teacher of Sun Wukong. At Guanyin's request, he takes the form of Puti Zushi and teaches Sun Wukong magical skills.
