= Lotus Lantern (TV series) =

- Genre: Shenmo
- Based on: The Magic Lotus Lantern
- Written by: Wang Dawei
- Screenplay by: Jiu Nian; Li Hongwei
- Directed by: Yu Mang Sang; Zhao Jian
- Starring: Cao Jun; Vincent Chiao; Shu Chang; Yvonne Lim; Liu Yuqiao; Liu Xiaoqing; Park Si-yeon
- Music by: Zhou Zhi Yong; Zhang Chao
- Opening theme: Inextinguishable Heart (不灭的心)
- Ending theme: My Everything (我的全部)
- Composer: Jin Fuzai
- Country of origin: China
- Original language: Mandarin
- No. of seasons: 1
- No. of episodes: 35

Production
- Executive producer: Zhang Zengxiang
- Producers: Gao Jianmin; Li Gongda; Jia Xiaochen; Song Dan; Chen Weisheng
- Editor: Gong Liming

Original release
- Network: CCTV-8

Lotus Lantern (Chinese: 宝莲灯; pinyin: Băo Lián Dēng) is a 2005 Chinese television drama. It is based on the Chinese fairy tale The Magic Lotus Lantern (劈山救母; Pī Shān Jiù Mǔ). The 35-episode series was premiered on CCTV-8 starting on October 4, 2005. A prequel, Prequel to the Lotus Lantern, was broadcast in 2009.

== Premise ==
For falling in love with a mortal man, goddess San Shengmu is punished by Heaven and imprisoned beneath Mount Hua by her brother, Erlang Shen. Fearing for the safety of their son, Chenxiang, her husband Liu Yanchang raises Chenxiang as a mortal helping make lanterns and hiding the truth of his lineage. When Chenxiang turns 16, however, his powers abruptly waken and he is pursued by his uncle, Erlang Shen, whereupon he learns the truth of his mother's fate. Chenxiang promptly undertakes an arduous journey to free her and reunite his family with help of a powerful artefact known as the Lotus Lantern. However, in doing so, he defies the will of Heaven and incurs the wrath of the Celestial Court.

== Cast ==
=== Main ===
- Cao Jun as Liu Chenxiang
- Shu Chang as Xiao Yu
- Vincent Chiao as Erlang Shen
- Liu Yuqiao as eighth Prince
- Yvonne Lim as Ding Xiang

=== Support Cast ===
- Liu Xiao Feng as Liu Yanchang
- Park Si-yeon as San Shengmu
- Liu Xiao Qing as Queen Mother of the West (voiced by Wang Bo)
- Wang Wei Guo as Jade Emperor
- Jian Ding as Sun Wukong / Lao Dao (voiced by Shang Hong)
- Xie Ning as Zhu Bajie
- Wang Yonggui as Mei Shan Lao Da / King Dragon of Mount Mei
- Li Baocheng as Mei Shan Lao Er
- Zhao Shujun as Mei Shan Lao Si
- Li Jianxun as Mei Shan Lao Liu
- Chen Chuang as Xiaotian Quan
- Yan Danchen as Chang'e
- You Ben Chang as Tai Shang Lao Jun
