= New Gods: Yang Jian =

2022 Chinese animated film

- Simplified Chinese: 新神榜：杨戬
- Traditional Chinese: 新神榜：楊戩
- Literal meaning: New Gods: Yang Jian
- Hanyu Pinyin: Xin Shen Bang: Yang Jian
- Directed by: Zhao Ji
- Screenplay by: Mu Chuan
- Based on: Investiture of the Gods by Xu Zhonglin and Lu Xixing
- Produced by: Lu Xi
- Music by: Guo Haowei
- Production companies: Light Chaser Animation Studios; Bilibili
- Distributed by: Taopiaopiao; Bona Film Group; Bilibili
- Release date: August 19, 2022 (China)
- Running time: 116 minutes
- Country: China
- Language: Chinese
- Box office: US$82.4 million

New Gods: Yang Jian is a Chinese 3D animated fantasy action film directed by Zhao Ji and written by Mu Chuan. The film is based on the character of Yang Jian (also known as Erlang Shen in other versions) from the Ming dynasty novel Investiture of the Gods, and was released on August 19, 2022, as a sequel to the 2021 film New Gods: Nezha Reborn.

The film's distribution rights in North America was bought by GKIDS, who also produced an English dub of the film. The GKIDS version was released on January 20, 2023.

== Plot ==
Twelve years after imprisoning his sister underneath a mountain, Erlang Shen, a god known for his all-seeing third eye, now works as a bounty hunter. A woman hires him and his crew to prevent his nephew, Chenxiang, from obtaining a magical lotus lantern that holds great power.

== Characters ==
Yang Jian/Erlang Shen
Voiced by: Nicholas Andrew Louie (English)

Wanluo
Voiced by: Christine Lin (English)

Master Yuding
Voiced by: Parry Shen (English)

Chenxiang
Voiced by: Luke Naphat Sath (English)

Shen Gongbao
Voiced by James Sie (English)

== Dubbed versions ==
A Japanese dubbed version of the film was released in Japanese theaters on March 21, 2025, under the name "Youzen". This dub has Ae! Group's Masaya Sano voicing Youzen, one of the main characters, a bounty hunter who has lost his "divine power", and Toshiki Masuda as Jinkou, a boy who stole "divine power". The group performed "ROCK'NPOP", which is included in their album "D.N.A", as the film's theme song.
