= Guang yi ji =

Tang dynasty collection of short stories

Great Book of Marvels
- Author: Dai Fu
- Original title: Guang yi ji (廣異記)
- Language: Classical Chinese
- Genre: Chuanqi; Zhiguai
- Publication place: China

The Guang yi ji (traditional Chinese: 廣異記; simplified Chinese: 广异记; pinyin: Guǎng Yì Jì), translated into English as the Great Book of Marvels, is a collection of Classical Chinese stories written in the eighth century by Tang dynasty author Dai Fu. Although the original manuscript is now lost, over three hundred stories are preserved in various texts from the late Tang and early Song dynasties.

== Publication history ==
Dai Fu (戴孚), who graduated as a jinshi in 757, wrote most of the entries in the Guang yi ji while he was working as a bureaucrat in Zhejiang in the 760s and 770s. Many of the stories are set in this time and place; Dai claimed to have either witnessed the recorded events himself or heard about them from other local officials. Some stories appear in earlier texts and may have been transcribed by Dai into his work.

Like most other short story collections from the Tang dynasty, the original manuscript purportedly comprising twenty scrolls and around a hundred thousand characters is now lost. However, some three hundred stories are preserved in the Taiping guangji, while a few others can be found in reference books from the late Tang and early Song dynasties, such as the Suishi guangji (歲時廣記) or the Taiping yulan.

The undated preface for the Guang yi ji was written by Gu Kuang, who had become a jinshi at the same time as Dai. Gu received the stories from Dai's two sons after his death at the end of the eighth century. In the preface, Gu briefly recounts the history of what he calls zhiguai or "strange tales" and suggests that Dai's supernatural stories would be regarded by contemporary readers as being of the same genre as historical records. (Note: By a similar token, British sinologist Glen Dudbridge stressed that even though the term xiaoshuo might include works of fiction in its modern usage, the Guang yi ji should be seen as "a literature of record, not of fantasy or creative fiction.") Gu's preface survives in a sixteenth-century reprint of the tenth-century anthology Wenyuan yinghua, while variants of it can be found it at least a couple of later texts.

== Contents ==
The following is a summary of a select number of Guang yi ji entries that survive in the Taiping guangji, although their order in the original text is unknown.

"Xu Fu" (徐福) first recounts the legend of the titular character, followed by a sick man's successful attempt to find him during the Kaiyuan era.

"Master Pupu" (僕僕先生) follows the titular Taoist immortal and his dispute with a Huainan official.

"Two Gentlemen Called Zhang and Li" (張李二公) concerns two Taoists who befriend one another at Mount Tai; one becomes an official, while the other attains immortality.

In "Liu Qingzhen" (劉清真), twenty tea merchants get lost and are led to Mount Wutai by a mysterious monk, who subsequently transports them to Mount Lu. There, one of the men eats a magic fungus and transforms into a crane; the remaining men return home, only to discover that they have been gone for twenty years.

A man is led by a pig to a group of immortals in "A Man of Mayang Village" (麻陽村人), while a group of rebels avoid being killed by dragons on an island but are caught and executed after suffering a shipwreck in "The Compassionate Immortal" (慈心仙人). "Old Wang" (王老) tells of a man's brief encounter with divine cranes.

"Immortal Li" (李仙人) narrates the unfortunate events after a widow's marriage to a disgraced deity. "Venerable Master Pan" (潘尊師) introduces Mount Song and its Taoist guardians. In "Qin Women" (秦時婦人), an exiled monk encounters a group of women in the Yanmen Pass. "He Erniang" (何二娘) recalls the titular shoe weaver's retreat to Mount Luofu.

In "Bian Dongxuan" (邊洞玄), an octogenerian turns immortal after she consumes some boiled noodles. In "Zhang Lianqiao" (張連翹), a Taoist nun fails to ascend to heaven and lives for the rest of her life without food. "Fu Shentong" (輔神通) culminates in the An Lushan rebellion. A man is killed after doubting the power of the vajra in "The Vajra Figures of Wuzhou" (婺州金剛).

While awaiting execution, a prisoner in Chang'an recites the Diamond Sutra for forty days in "A Prisoner in Chang'an" (長安縣繫囚). The Diamond Sutra is mentioned in at least twenty-two other stories. In "Zhang Guo's Daughter" (張果女), a deceased fifteen-year-old is brought back to life; she subsequently marries the man who dug her out of her grave.

Other extant Guang yi ji entries include but are not limited to "The Hermit of Mount Heng" (衡山隱者), "Chen Lipin" (陳利賓), "The Master of the Three Cuts" (三刀師), "The Abbot of Longxing Monastery" (龍興寺主), "Chen Zhe" (陳哲), "Seng Daoxian" (僧道憲), "Censor Zhang" (張御史), "The Mount-Splitting Sword" (破山劍), "Metropolitan Graduate Li" (李進士), "Yang Yuanying" (楊元英), "Su Pi's Daughter" (蘇丕女), "Ouyang the Thunder Defier" (歐陽忽雷), "The Purple Goat" (紫⺶末羯), "The Myrobalan" (訶黎勒), "A Tiger's Woman" (虎婦), "A Great Fish of the Southern Ocean" (南海大魚), "A Great Crab of the Southern Ocean" (南海大蟹), and "The Lord of Tao Trims a Tongue" (道君剪舌).

== Reception ==
Dutch sinologist J. J. M. de Groot, who translated thirty-five stories in the collection, remarked that the Guang yi ji "forms one of the most valuable sources for the study of Chinese folklore."
