= Hebei bangzi =

Genre of Chinese opera

Hebei bangzi (河北梆子) is a genre of Chinese opera from the northern province of Hebei. It may also be found in the nearby cities of Beijing and Tianjin, as well as in Shandong, Henan, Heilongjiang, Jilin, Liaoning, and Inner Mongolia, as well as some areas south of the Yangtze River such as Shanghai and Wuhan.

Hebei bangzi is derived from Qinqiang and Shanxi bangzi operas, which were introduced to Hebei during the middle of the Qing Dynasty. It is sung in Beijing dialect.

There are more than 500 stories used in Hebei bangzi.
