= List of Major National Historical and Cultural Sites in Shaanxi =

This list is of Major Sites Protected for their Historical and Cultural Value at the National Level in the Province of Shaanxi, People's Republic of China.

Site	Chinese name	Location	Designation	Image
Yan'an Revolutionary Site	Yan'an geming yizhi 延安革命遗址	Yan'an	1-23	Upload file
Rock Carvings and Stone Gate on the Baoxie Road	Baoxiedao shimen jiqi Moya shike 褒斜道石门及其摩崖石刻	Hanzhong	1-57	Upload file
Giant Wild Goose Pagoda	Dayan ta 大雁塔	Xi'an	1-63	Upload file
Small Wild Goose Pagoda	Xiaoyan ta 小雁塔	Xi'an; 34°14′52″N 108°56′17″E	1-64	Upload file
Xingjiao Temple Pagoda	Xingjiao si ta 兴教寺塔	Xi'an; 34°05′29″N 109°02′02″E	1-67	Upload file
Xi'an City Wall	Xi'an chengqiang 西安城墙	Xi'an	1-104	Upload file
Stele Forest	Xi'an beilin 西安碑林	Xi'an; 34°15′18″N 108°56′53″E	1-125	Upload file
Stone Sculptures on Yaowang Mountain	Yaowangshan shike 药王山石刻	Tongchuan	1-128	Upload file
Banpo site	Banpo yizhi 半坡遗址	Xi'an; 34°16′24″N 109°03′04″E	1-139	Upload file
Fenghao	Feng-Hao yizhi 丰镐遗址	Xi'an	1-143	Upload file
Epang Palace	Epang gong yizhi 阿房宫遗址	Xi'an; 34°15′31″N 108°48′37″E	1-151	Upload file
Han Capital of Chang'an	Han Chang'an cheng yizhi 汉长安城遗址	Xi'an 西安市; 34°16′00″N 108°54′00″E	1-152	Upload file
Daming Palace	Daming gong yizhi 大明宫遗址	Xi'an; 34°17′02″N 108°57′58″E	1-156	Upload file
Mausoleum of the Yellow Emperor	Huangdi ling 黄帝陵	Huangling County; 35°34′44″N 109°15′59″E	1-162	Upload file
Mausoleum of Qin Shi Huang	Qin Shihuang ling 秦始皇陵	Xi'an; 34°23′06″N 109°16′23″E	1-164	Upload file
Maoling Mausoleum	Maoling 茂陵	Xingping; 34°20′09″N 108°34′13″E	1-165	Upload file
Tomb of Huo Qubing	Huo Qubing mu 霍去病墓	Xingping	1-166	Upload file
Zhao Mausoleum (Tang dynasty)	Tang Zhao ling 唐昭陵	Liquan County	1-170	Upload file
Qianling Mausoleum	Qianling 乾陵	Qian County; 34°34′23″N 108°13′07″E	1-171	Upload file
Shunling Mausoleum	Shun ling 顺陵	Xianyang	1-172	Upload file
Site of the Xi'an Incident	Xi'an shibian jiuzhi 西安事变旧址	Xi'an; 34°16′00″N 108°56′00″E	2-6	Upload file
Lantian Man Site	Lantian yuanren yizhi 蓝田猿人遗址	Lantian County	2-47	Upload file
Zhouyuan	Zhouyuan yizhi 周原遗址	Fufeng County	2-50	Upload file
Tomb and Temple of Sima Qian	Sima Qian mu he ci 司马迁墓和祠	Hancheng	2-56	Upload file
Wayaobu Revolutionary Site	Wayaobu geming jiuzhi 瓦窑堡革命旧址	Zichang County	3-35	Upload file
Eighth Route Army Xi'an Office	Balujun Xi'an banshichu jiuzhi 八路军西安办事处旧址	Xi'an	3-36	Upload file
Great Buddhist Temple Caves	Dafo si shiku 大佛寺石窟	Bin County	3-49	Upload file
Zhongshan Caves	Zhongshan shiku 钟山石窟	Zichang County	3-51	Upload file
Main Hall of Zhaoren Temple	Zhaoren si dadian 昭仁寺大殿	Changwu County	3-109	Upload file
Xiyue Temple	Xiyue miao 西岳庙	Huayin	3-126	Upload file
Great Mosque of Xi'an	Xi'an Qingzhensi 西安清真寺	Xi'an; 34°15′48″N 108°56′11″E	3-135	Upload file
Qin Capital of Yongcheng	Qin Yongcheng yizhi 秦雍城遗址	Fengxiang County	3-204	Upload file
Qin Capital of Xianyang	Qin Xianyang cheng yizhi 秦咸阳城遗址	Xianyang	3-207	Upload file
Yaozhou Kiln Site at Huangbao	Huangbao zhen Yaozhou yao yizhi 黄堡镇耀州窑遗址	Tongchuan	3-226	Upload file
Changling Mausoleum	Changling 长陵	Xianyang	3-233	Upload file
Duling Mausoleum	Duling 杜陵	Xi'an	3-234	Upload file
Qiaoling Mausoleum	Qiaoling 桥陵	Pucheng County	3-243	Upload file
Jiangzhai site	Jiangzhai yizhi 姜寨遗址	Xi'an	4-20	Upload file
Zhengguo Canal	Zheng Guo qu shou yizhi 郑国渠首遗址	Jingyang County; 34°35′09″N 108°46′33″E	4-31	Upload file
Great Wall of Wei	Wei changcheng yizhi 魏长城遗址	Huayin	4-32	Upload file
Ganquan Palace	Ganquan gong yizhi 甘泉宫遗址	Chunhua County	4-39	Upload file
Tongwancheng	Tongwan cheng yizhi 统万城遗址	Jingbian County; 37°59′51″N 108°51′46″E	4-43	Upload file
Sui Capital of Daxing and Tang Capital of Chang'an	Sui Daxing Tang Chang'an cheng yizhi 隋大兴唐长安城遗址	Xi'an	4-47	Upload file
Sui Renshou Palace and Tang Jiucheng Palace	Sui Renshou gong Tang Jiucheng gong yizhi 隋仁寿宫唐九成宫遗址	Linyou County	4-48	Upload file
Ba Bridge site	Baqiao yizhi 灞桥遗址	Xi'an	4-49	Upload file
Huaqing Palace	Huaqing gong yizhi 华清宫遗址	Xi'an	4-53	Upload file
Wuhou Tomb	Wu hou mu 武侯墓	Mian County	4-68	Upload file
Tailing Mausoleum	Tailing 泰陵	Xianyang	4-69	Upload file
Yongling Mausoleum	Yongling 永陵	Fuping County	4-70	Upload file
Fawang Pagoda at Xianyou Temple	Xianyou si fawang ta 仙游寺法王塔	Zhouzhi County	4-80	Upload file
Fuzhoucheng	Fuzhou cheng 府州城	Fugu County; 39°44′00″N 121°42′37″E	4-93	Upload file
Hancheng Dayu Temple	Hancheng Dayu miao 韩城大禹庙	Hancheng	4-126	Upload file
Drum Tower and Bell Tower of Xi'an	Xi'an zhonglou, gulou 西安钟楼、鼓楼	Xi'an; 34°15′42″N 108°56′19″E	4-161	Upload file
Shuilu Temple	Shuilu an 水陆庵	Lantian County	4-162	Upload file
Yanyijing Site	Yanyijing jiuzhi 延一井旧址	Yanchang County	4-250	Upload file
Tianshuigou Site	Tianshuigou yizhi 甜水沟遗址	Dali County	5-110	Upload file
Huashilang Site	Huashilang yizhi 花石浪遗址	Luonan County	5-111	Upload file
Yuanjunmiao-Quanhucun site	Yuanjunmiao - Quanhucun yizhi 元君庙—泉护村遗址	Hua County	5-112	Upload file
Kangjia Site	Kangjia yizhi 康家遗址	Xi'an	5-113	Upload file
Laoniupo Site	Laoniupo yizhi 老牛坡遗址	Xi'an	5-114	Upload file
Yueyang City ruins	Yueyang cheng yizhi 栎阳城遗址	Xi'an	5-115	Upload file
Jingshicang Site	Jingshi cang yizhi 京师仓遗址	Huayin	5-116	Upload file
Liangzhou Site	Liangzhou yizhi 良周遗址	Chengcheng County	5-117	Upload file
Dong Wei Bridge site	Dong Wei qiao yizhi 东渭桥遗址	Gaoling County	5-118	Upload file
Yuhua Palace ruins	Yuhua gong yizhi 玉华宫遗址	Tongchuan	5-119	Upload file
Imperial mausoleums of the Western Han	Xi Han di ling 西汉帝陵	Xianyang	5-183	Upload file
Imperial mausoleums of the Tang dynasty	Tangdai diling 唐代帝陵	Fuping County	5-184	Upload file
Sanyuan City God Temple	Sanyuan chenghuang miao 三原城隍庙	Sanyuan County	5-413	Upload file
Sarira Stupa of Kumārajīva	Jiumoluoshi shelita 鸠摩罗什舍利塔	Hu County	5-414	Upload file
Gongshu Hall	Gongshu tang 公输堂	Hu County	5-415	Upload file
Cang Jie Temple and tomb	Cang Jie mu yu miao 仓颉墓与庙	Baishui County	5-416	Upload file
Tai Pagoda	Taita 泰塔	Xunyi County	5-417	Upload file
Shandao Pagoda of Xiangji Temple	Xiangji si shandao ta 香积寺善导塔	Xi'an	5-418	Upload file
Xi'an City God Temple	Xi'an chenghuang miao 西安城隍庙	Xi'an	5-419	Upload file
Baiyunshan Temple	Baiyunshan miao 白云山庙	Jia County	5-420	Upload file
Bayun Pagoda	Bayun ta 八云塔	Zhouzhi County	5-421	Upload file
Chongwen Pagoda	Jingyang Chongwen ta 泾阳崇文塔	Jingyang County	5-422	Upload file
Kaiyuan Temple Pagoda, Bin County	Bin xian Kaiyuan sita 彬县开元寺塔	Bin County	5-423	Upload file
Hancheng Puzhao Temple	Hancheng Puzhao si 韩城普照寺	Hancheng	5-424	Upload file
Hancheng Confucian Temple	Hancheng wenmiao 韩城文庙	Hancheng	5-425	Upload file
Hancheng City God Temple	Hancheng chenghuang miao 韩城城隍庙	Hancheng	5-426	Upload file
Old Architecture of Dangjia village	Dangjiacun gu jianzhuqun 党家村古建筑群	Hancheng	5-427	Upload file
Yao County Confucian Temple	Yao xian wenmiao 耀县文庙	Tongchuan	5-428	Upload file
Chengcheng City God Temple	Chengcheng chenghuang miao shenlou 澄城城隍庙神楼	Chengcheng County	5-429	Upload file
Zhenbeitai Great Wall	Changcheng - Zhenbeitai 长城—镇北台	Yulin	5-442(9)	Upload file
Chongyang Temple Stele Forest	Chongyang gong Zu'an beilin 重阳宫祖庵碑林	Hu County	5-466	Upload file
Cishan Temple Grottoes	Cishansi shiku 慈善寺石窟	Linyou County	5-467	Upload file
Site of the Luochuan Conference	Luochuan huiyi jiuzhi 洛川会议旧址	Luochuan County	5-509	Upload file
Revolutionary Site of Yangjiagou	Yangjiagou geming jiuzhi 杨家沟革命旧址	Mizhi County	5-510	Upload file
Longgangsi Site	Longgangsi yizhi 龙岗寺遗址	Nanzheng County	6-189	Upload file
Shimao site	Shimao yizhi 石峁遗址	Shenmu County	6-190	Upload file
Shiluoluoshan site	Shiluoluo shan yizhi 石摞摞山遗址	Jia County	6-191	Upload file
Lijiacun Site	Lijiacun yizhi 李家村遗址	Xixiang County	6-192	Upload file
Beishouling Site	Beishouling yizhi 北首岭遗址	Baoji	6-193	Upload file
Donglongshan Site	Donglongshan yizhi 东龙山遗址	Shangluo	6-194	Upload file
Hengzhen Site	Hengzhen yizhi 横阵遗址	Huayin	6-195	Upload file
Fenghuangshan Site	Fenghuang shan yizhi 凤凰山遗址	Qishan County	6-196	Upload file
Lijiaya city site	Lijiaya chengzhi 李家崖城址	Qingjian County	6-197	Upload file
Liangdaicun site	Liangdaicun yizhi 梁带村遗址	Hancheng	6-198	Upload file
Yangjiacun site	Yangjiacun yizhi 杨家村遗址	Mei County	6-199	Upload file
Famen Temple	Famen si yizhi 法门寺遗址	Fufeng County	6-200	Upload file
Linzhou City site	Linzhou gucheng 麟州故城	Shenmu County	6-201	Upload file
Qin Dongling	Qin dongling 秦东陵	Xi'an	6-284	Upload file
Tomb of Zhang Qian	Zhang Qian mu 张骞墓	Chenggu County	6-285	Upload file
Tombs of Ming dynasty Princes of Qin	Ming Qin wang mu 明秦王墓	Xi'an	6-286	Upload file
Tomb and Temple of Cai Lun	Cai Lun mu he ci 蔡伦墓和祠	Yang County	6-287	Upload file
Jingjin Temple Pagoda	Jingjin si ta 精进寺塔	Chengcheng County	6-769	Upload file
Chang'an Shengshou Temple Pagoda	Chang'an Shengshou si ta 长安圣寿寺塔	Xi'an	6-770	Upload file
Chang'an Huayan Temple Pagoda	Chang'an Huayan si ta 长安华严寺塔	Xi'an	6-771	Upload file
Bailiang Shousheng Temple Pagoda	Bailiang Shousheng si ta 百良寿圣寺塔	Heyang County	6-772	Upload file
Zhaohui Pagoda	Zhaohui ta 昭慧塔	Gaoling County	6-773	Upload file
Kaiming Temple Pagoda	Kaiming si ta 开明寺塔	Yang County	6-774	Upload file
Daqin Temple Pagoda	Daqin si ta 大秦寺塔	Zhouzhi County; 34°02′49″N 108°18′00″E	6-775	Upload file
Taiping Temple Pagoda	Taiping si ta 太平寺塔	Qishan County	6-776	Upload file
Wuling Temple Pagoda	Wuling si ta 武陵寺塔	Yongshou County	6-777	Upload file
Shende Temple Pagoda	Shende si ta 神德寺塔	Tongchuan	6-778	Upload file
Fawang Temple, Hancheng	Fawang miao 法王庙	Hancheng	6-779	Upload file
Beiying Temple	Beiying miao 北营庙	Hancheng	6-780	Upload file
Wumen Weir	Wumenyan 五门堰	Chenggu County	6-781	Upload file
Wubu Stone Town	Wubu shicheng 吴堡石城	Wubu County	6-782	Upload file
Zhougong Miao (Duke of Zhou Temple)	Zhougong miao 周公庙	Qishan County	6-783	Upload file
Yulin Fortress	Yulin weicheng 榆林卫城	Yulin	6-784	Upload file
Zhang Liang Temple	Zhang Liang miao 张良庙	Liuba County	6-785	Upload file
Fufeng City God Temple	Fufeng Chenghuang miao 扶风城隍庙	Fufeng County	6-786	Upload file
Jade Emperor and Houtu Temple	Yuhuang Houtu miao 玉皇后土庙	Hancheng	6-787	Upload file
Xuanwu Temple Qingshi Hall	Xuanwu miao Qingshi dian 玄武庙青石殿	Heyang County	6-788	Upload file
Qing'an Temple Pagoda	Qing'an si ta 庆安寺塔	Weinan	6-789	Upload file
Xianyang Confucian Temple	Xianyang wenmiao 咸阳文庙	Xianyang	6-790	Upload file
Old Architecture of Panlongshan	Panlongshan gu jianzhuqun 盘龙山古建筑群	Mizhi County	6-791	Upload file
Jiang Family Residence	Jiangshi zhuangyuan 姜氏庄园	Mizhi County	6-792	Upload file
Fengtu Granary	Fengtu yicang 丰图义仓	Dali County	6-793	Upload file
Lingyan Temple Cliffs	Lingyan si moya 灵岩寺摩崖	Lueyang County	6-864	Upload file
Shihong Temple Caves	Shihong si shiku 石泓寺石窟	Fu County	6-865	Upload file
Yang Xun Stele	Yang Xun bei 杨珣碑	Fufeng County	6-866	Upload file
Wan'an Temple Grottoes	Wan'an chanyuan shiku 万安禅院石窟	Huangling County	6-867	Upload file
Yisushe Theatre	Yisushe juchang 易俗社剧场	Xi'an	6-1066	Upload file
Site of the Wei-Hua Uprising	Wei-Hua qiyi jiuzhi 渭华起义旧址	Hua County	6-1067	Upload file
Wuqi Revolutionary Site	Wuqi geming jiuzhi 吴旗革命旧址	Wuqi County	6-1068	Upload file
Bao'an Revolutionary Site	Bao'an geming jiuzhi 保安革命旧址	Zhidan County	6-1069	Upload file

== See also ==
- Principles for the Conservation of Heritage Sites in China
