= Xiangji Temple =

Xiangji Temple (simplified Chinese: 香积寺; traditional Chinese: 香積寺; pinyin: Xiāngjī Sì) may refer to:

- Xiangji Temple (Shaanxi), in Xi'an, Shaanxi, China
- Xiangji Temple (Henan), in Ruzhou, Henan, China
- Xiangji Temple (Zhejiang), in Hangzhou, Zhejiang, China
