= Hancheng (disambiguation) =

Hancheng (韩城市) is a county-level city of Shaanxi, China.

Hancheng may also refer to:

- Hancheng (邗城), a former name of Yangzhou, Jiangsu, China
- Hancheng, Tangshan (韩城镇), town in Fengrun District, Tangshan, Hebei, China
- Hancheng Subdistrict (汉城街道), several subdistricts in China

== See also ==
- Seoul, the capital of South Korea. One of its former names was Hanseong (Korean: 한성; Hanja: 漢城), which can be read as "Hancheng" in Chinese.
