= Jia County =

Jia County may refer to the following locations in mainland China:

- Jia County, Henan (郏县)
- Jia County, Shaanxi (佳县)
