= Xiyue Temple =

Chinese Taoist temple in huayin

- 西岳庙
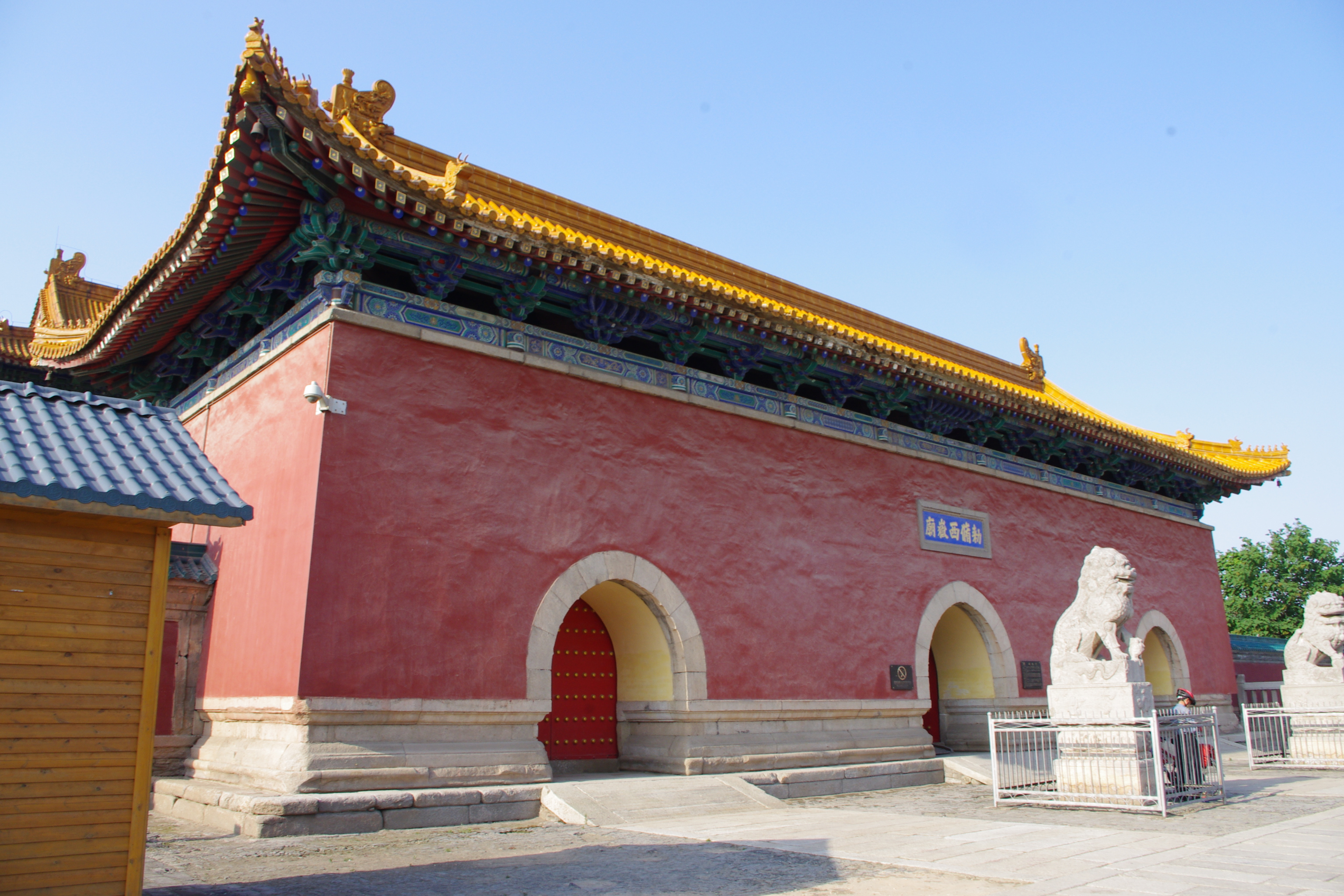
- Xiyue Temple

- Location within China

Religion
- Affiliation: Taoist
- Deity: Emperor Xiyue

Location
- Location: Huayin, Shaanxi
- Country: China
- Interactive map of Xiyue Temple
- Coordinates: 34°34′48″N 110°06′08″E

Architecture
- Style: Chinese architecture
- Founder: Emperor Wu
- Completed: 134 BC

The Xiyue Temple (西岳庙) is a Chinese Taoist temple located at the foot of Mount Hua of the city of Huayin in the northwest of the Shaanxi Province. Here the emperor sacrificed to the god of Mount Hua. Its magnificence is compared to that of the Imperial Palace in Beijing and it is called the "Forbidden City of Shaanxi".

== History ==
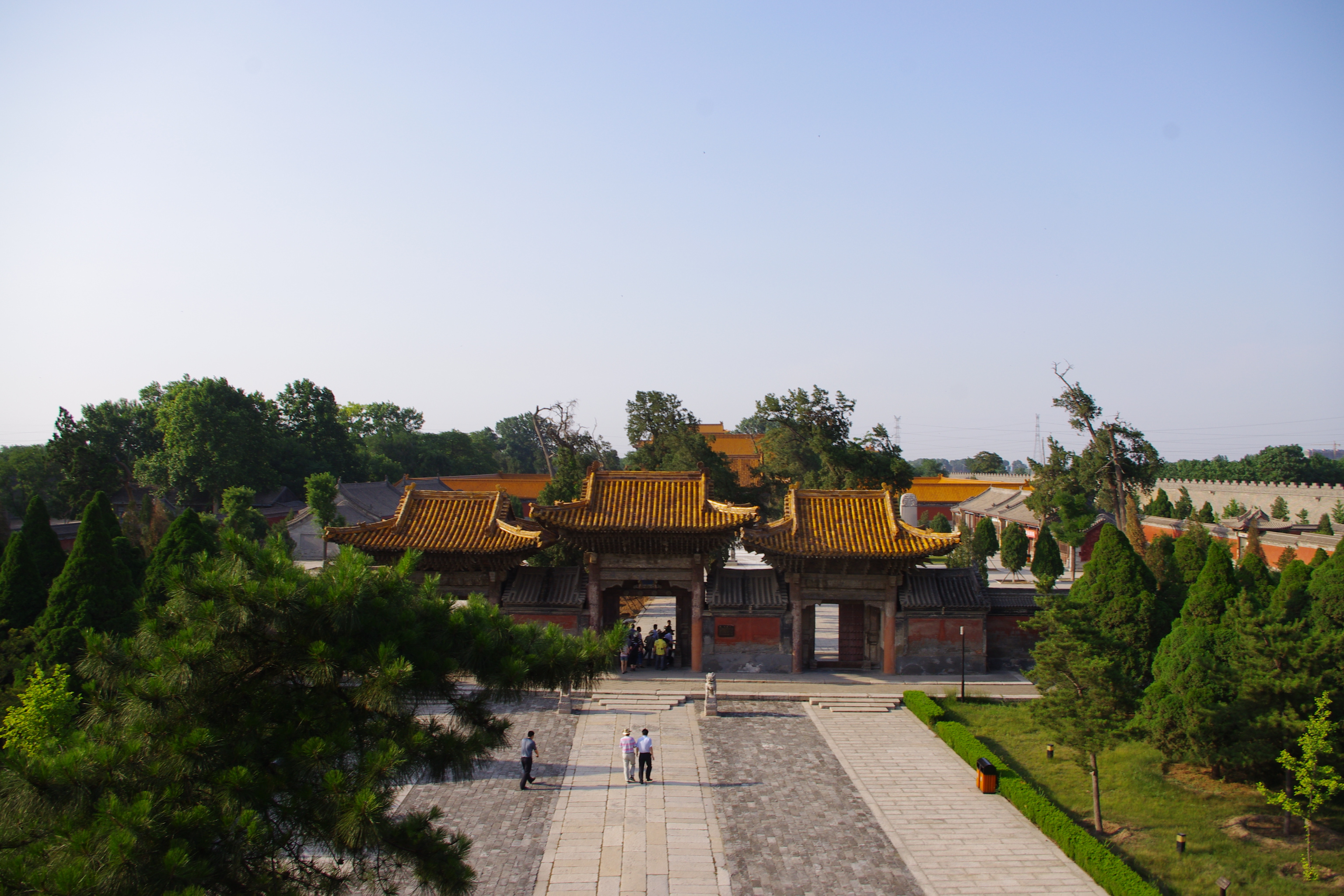
Entrance to the Xiyue Temple

The temple was built in 134 BC by Emperor Wu of the Western Han dynasty. Emperor Wu built the first worship temple of Emperor Xiyue, the god of Mount Hua, at the foot of the mountain. He named the temple Jilinggong Palace. In the following East Han dynasty, the temple was moved to the present location and its name was changed to Xiyue Temple.

The temple was renovated several times in subsequent dynasties. The current buildings date from the Ming and Qing dynasties. The Xiyue Temple has been on the list of monuments of the People's Republic of China (3–126) since 1988.
