= Zhougong Miao =

Western Zhou period archaeological site

- Location within China
- 34°29′17.365″N 107°36′0.940″E
- Location: Baoji, Qishan County, Shaanxi

Chinese name
- Traditional Chinese: 周公廟遺址
- Simplified Chinese: 周公庙遗址
- Literal meaning: "Dig site of the Temple of the Duke of Zhou"
Transcriptions
Standard Mandarin
- Hanyu Pinyin: Zhōugōng Miào yízhǐ

Alternative Chinese name
- Traditional Chinese: 鳳凰山遺址
- Simplified Chinese: 凤凰山遗址
- Literal meaning: Dig site of Fenghuang Mountain
Transcriptions
Standard Mandarin
- Hanyu Pinyin: Fènghuáng Shān yízhǐ

Second alternative Chinese name
- Chinese: 卷阿
- Literal meaning: Juan Mound
Transcriptions
Standard Mandarin
- Hanyu Pinyin: juǎn ē
Middle Chinese
- Middle Chinese: kjwenX 'a
Old Chinese
- Baxter–Sagart (2014): /*[k](r)o[n]ʔ /ʔˤa/
- Zhengzhang: /*kronʔ qaːl/

Zhougong Miao, also known as the Fenghuang Shan site or the Temple of the Duke of Zhou, is an archaeological site dating back to the Western Zhou period of Chinese history located in Qishan County, Shaanxi.

The buildings in and around Zhougong Miao have been included on the Major Sites Protected for their Historical and Cultural Value at the National Level since 2006, under entries 6-783 and 6-196. It was named one of the Top 10 archaeological discoveries in China in 2008. It also won first prize in the National Cultural Heritage Administration Field Archaeology Award (全国十大考古新发现) in 2009. It is an AAAA-class tourist attraction.

== Name ==
Upon excavation, based on an oracle bone stating "Zhou Gong" (周公) being discovered, Yuan Zhongyi stated that the site is likely to be a family cemetery related to the family of Ji Dan, the Duke of Zhou, who served King Wen and King Wu of Zhou. The name Zhougong Miao refers to a temple that was built by Emperor Gaozu of Tang.

The site is occasionally referred to as Juan'e (卷阿), based on the poem of the same name from the Classic of Poetry, which describes a curved hill where breeze comes from the south. The Bamboo Annals refer to King Cheng of Zhou sending civil and military officials to Juan'e. However, no bones written by the Zhou in this location refer to the site in this way, and the Juan'e in the poem has historically been argued to not be a placename.

== Archaeology ==
The site was unearthed in 2004 in what was the historical location of Zhouyuan, a central pillar of the Zhou dynasty. Along with the burial grounds, the dig revealed a 1,500 metre-long city wall and six sites where buildings would be, and spans 620000 m^{2} overall. There are over 10 ancestral tombs. Endymion Wilkinson believes that this site contains Zhou lords generally.

The site is unusual for hosting over 20 porcelain items, concealed in Tomb No.32, which are not normally seen in Western Zhou tombs. Xu Tianjin, from the Peking University's Department of Archaeology, believes that this is a sign of northern Chinese having the technology to produce their own porcelain, as the site's yellow and green glazed items are not seen in the south, where this is more commonly seen.

Evidence of human habitation has been found in the surrounding area dating back around 6,000 years.

=== Oracle bones ===
The site is known for housing around 800 oracle bone inscriptions and is thus one of several key sources of post-Shang dynasty use of oracle bone script. For this reason, it is sometimes considered an analogue to Yinxu, the royal halls of the Late Shang. Over 7,000 bones have been found in the site; as many of these are fragmented, rejoining them is essential in contemporary scholarship for identifying characters and, thereafter, deciphering any inscriptions. Of the 2,200 characters were found on the bones, over 1,600 were identified within the first few years of discovery. Sacrifices to Zhou ancestors, such as King Ji of Zhou, have been unearthed, using vocabulary similar to that seen in Shang inscriptions.
