= Battle of Xiangji Temple =

- Part of An Lushan Rebellion
Date	13 November 757
Location	Northeast of Xiangji Temple, Chang'an
Result	Tang victory
Territorial changes	Tang forces recapture Chang'an

Belligerents
Tang	Yan

Commanders and leaders
Li Chu; Guo Ziyi; Li Siye; Wang Sili; Pugu Huai'en; Ulu Bilge Tardush Yabghu	An Qingxu; An Shouzhong; Li Guiren; Zhang Tongru; Tian Qianzhen

Strength
150,000	100,000

Casualties and losses
70,000 dead	60,000 dead 20,000 captured

The Battle of Xiangji Temple (Chinese: 香積寺之戰; pinyin: Xiāngjīsì zhī zhàn) was a pitched battle of the An Lushan rebellion during Medieval China, between loyalist forces of Tang dynasty and the usurping Yan dynasty. The campaign was launched by Tang forces to recapture the fallen imperial capital Chang'an from the Yan rebels, who met them in a field battle near Xiangji Temple southwest of the capital. Despite suffering heavy casualties, the Tang forces were able to inflict a decisive blow upon the Yan army and force them to retreat, allowing Chang'an to be recaptured after the battle. The battle is notable as one of the bloodiest one-day battles in ancient history.

== Background ==
After the Yan army captured most of Northern China proper by 756, remaining Tang forces rallied around the newly-enthroned Emperor Suzong in Lingwu, and by 757, with Yan forces having become severely depleted following the Siege of Suiyang and a series of costly campaigns in modern day Shanxi, the Tang army was prepared to counterattack. After a setback in May 757 in which Tang forces were defeated by a Yan cavalry led by An Shouzhong attack at the Battle of Qingqu, in October 757, a large Tang field army composed of forces from the Shuofang circuit and Anxi military districts as well as Uyghur and Arab auxiliaries was amassed in Fengxiang (in modern Baoji, Shaanxi) under the nominal command of Li Chu, heir of Emperor Suzong, with Guo Ziyi serving as the actual field commander. The Tang army attacked Yan forces around Chang'an on 29 October 757 by Chinese lunar calendar.

== Battle ==
On 13 November, the Tang and Yan armies clashed on the plains to the Northwest of Chang'an by the Xiangji Temple. The Tang vanguard were led by Li Siye, who oversaw the infantry from the Anxi and Beiting garrisons. Guo Ziyi held command in the central army, with the Shuofang army as his main force, supported by troops from Khotan and others, while Wang Sili commanded the troops of the Guannei headquarters army as the rear support. Additionally Pugu Huai'en, a Tang general of Tiele descent, led 4,000 Uyghur cavalry concealed on the eastern flank of the main force serving as an ambush and scouting force. The Yan army was led by generals An Shouzhong and Li Guiren, commanding rough 100,000 troops including Yeluohe cavalry (mostly of Khitan, Kumo Xi, and Turkic origin) and the Kelan and Jinglue armies.

At noon, the Tang army seized the high ground of the hills northwest of Xiangji Temple, stretching their formation over thirty li. The Yan forces, placing themselves against the city of Chang'an facing south, arrayed their 100,000 troops over ten li, with cavalry placed on the eastern side of their formation. At noon, the rebel general Li Guiren led more than ten thousand cavalry in a charge against the infantry vanguard led by Li Siye. At the beginning of the battle, the Tang forces were at a disadvantage until Li Siye, bare-chested and wielding a glaive, charged into the Yan formation and killed dozens of rebel soldiers, stabilizing his own formation. He then led 2,000 glaive-armed troops in repeated charges against the enemy cavalry. The battle became deadlocked, and several thousand of Yan's armored cavalry, commanded by An Shouzhong, attempted a flank attack, intending to encircle the Tang forces by repeating tactics used earlier during the Battle of Qingqu. However, this move was anticipated by Guo Ziyi, who had 4,000 Uyghur heavy cavalry hidden on the side and rear, who then charged down from the high ground and significantly damaged the cohesion of the Yan army.

The Yan army continued to hold their formation until late in the afternoon, until finally collapsing due to high casualties, with 60,000 beheaded. The Yan general Zhang Tongru then abandoned Chang'an and fled east.

== Aftermath ==
The Tang army lost 70,000 men during the battle, with the Anxi and Beiting armies being nearly decimated. Yan casualties were also heavy at 80,000, and the bulk of their forces stationed around Chang'an were destroyed. An Shouzhong gathered his remaining forces and retreated back to Chang'an, then abandoned the city and continued retreating east during the night. Tang forces under Li Chu and Guo Ziyi recaptured Chang'an on 14 November, the day after the battle.
