= Shihong Temple Caves =

Buddhist site in Shaanxi, China

- 石泓寺石窟

Religion
- Affiliation: Buddhism

Location
- Location: Zhiluo Town, Fu County, Yan'an, Shaanxi
- Country: China

Architecture
- Style: Chinese architecture

The Shihong Temple Caves, (Chinese: 石泓寺石窟, Pinyin: Shíhóngsì Shíkū) also known as Shikong Temple, one of the Major Historical and Cultural Site Protected at the National Level, is a Buddhist site and one of the four greatest Northern Yan'an Grottoes. They are located in Shaanxi province, near Zhiluo Town, which is 65 km (40 mi) away from Fu County, Yan'an. The temple is situated on a cliff that is about 70 m (230 ft) long, arranged from east to west, with ten caves distributed along the cliff. The sixth and seventh caves from the east are particularly renowned and significant.

Caves in Yan'an exemplify Shaanxi province's cave art. They are typically integrated into mountains, cliffs, and along the river valleys, simplifying their construction. Notably, the ancient paths in front of the caves are a distinct feature. These geographical features are defining aspects of the Shihong Temple Caves. The mountains mainly consist of red sandstone and conglomerate, rock types that are easily excavated, shaped, and carved.

== History ==
Historical records about the origins of Shihong Temple Caves are scarce. However, researchers know that these caves were initially crafted in the fourth year of the Daye reign (608 CE) during the Sui dynasty (581-618 CE). The intricate carving work persisted for over a millennium, concluding in the Ming dynasty (1368-1644 CE). The early statues in the cave have characteristics of the Northern Wei (386-534 CE) style, which has led some scholars to suggest that it may have originated during that era.

== Caves ==
Among the ten caves, there are three types of architectural shapes: rectangular, square-like, and irregular. Seven of the caves were used for worship, two for burials, and one for meditation. The statues in Cave 7 are relatively well preserved, while the majority of the statues in the caves are headless or have damaged faces. The sixth and seventh caves from the east are particularly renowned and significant.

Cave #	Cave size	Construction time	Cave types	Contents	Current conditions
Cave 1	Depth: 2.4 m (7 ft 10 in), Width: 1.2 m (3 ft 11 in), Height：0.7 m (2 ft 4 in)	Uncertain	Cave for Burial	No statues	
Cave 2	Depth: 3.6 m (12 ft), Width: 3.3 m (11 ft), Height: 2.96 m (9 ft 9 in)	No later than Ming dynasty (1368 CE-1644 CE), 22nd year of Jiajing (1543 CE)	Cave for Worship	The three remaining statues on the altar—Śākyamuni, Laozi, and Confucius — are representatives of Buddhism, Daoism, and Confucianism. The cave was called "Three Religions Cave" (Chinese: 三教石洞, Pinyin: Sānjiào Shídòng) in the past.	The statues in the middle and right are headless. The face of the statue on the left has been eroded.
Cave 3	Depth: 4.9 m (16 ft), Width: 3.8 m (12 ft), Height: 1.8 m (5 ft 11 in)	No later than Song dynasty (960CE-1279 CE), second year of Kaibao (969 CE)	Cave for Worship	Śākyamuni, two disciples and five warriors are on the center altar. Cave 3 also includes images of twelve arhats and bodhisattvas on the side walls.	Some heads were damaged, and many faces were eroded.
Cave 4	Depth: 3.5 m (11 ft), Width: 3.1 m (10 ft), Height: 2.0 m (6 ft 7 in)	No later than Tang dynasty (618CE-690 CE, 705CE-907CE), fifth of Xiantong (864 CE)	Cave for Worship	Two square niches are on the left and right sides of Cave 4 and each niche contains a heavenly king statue. The upper right corner contains a bodhisattva in the Royal Ease Position. The statue of Tathāgata is in the northern section of Cave 4.	The heavenly king on the left has a damaged left arm. The heavenly king on the right has a damaged right arm, a bent left leg, and is stepping on an unknown object. The bodhisattva in the upper right corner is relatively intact. The statue of Tathāgata is well preserved.
Cave 5	Depth: 3.5 m (11 ft), Width: 2.7 m (8 ft 10 in), Height: 1.9 m (6 ft 3 in)	Started from the first year of Xiande, Later Zhou (954)	Cave for Worship	Two square niches are on the left and right sides of Cave 5, and each niche contains a heavenly king statue. Each niche contains a bodhisattva above the kings.	The two heavenly king's bodies are severely damaged, and the bodhisattva' faces are eroded.
Cave 6	Depth: 2.6 m (8 ft 6 in), Width: 3.9 m (13 ft), Height: 2.0 m (6 ft 7 in)	No later than Sui dynasty, 4th year of Daye (608 CE)	Cave for Worship	The right side of the cave has three niches. One Buddha, two bodhisattvas, two disciples, and a single sitting Buddha are distributed on the niches. Reliefs of Avalokiteśvara are also found on the walls.	The statues on the altar are completely destroyed. Statues on the side wall are eroded to different extents.
Cave 7	Depth: 10.6 m (35 ft), Width: 10.2 m (33 ft), Height: 5.4 m (18 ft) Platform: Depth: 6.2 m (20 ft), Width: 7.2 m (24 ft), Height: 0.8 m (2 ft 7 in)	Excavated in 1144 CE, during the Jin dynasty (1115CE-1234CE)	Cave for Worship	Buddha (Śākyamuni), Ānanda, Kaśyapa, Vairocana, and Mañjuśrī, are found on the center platform. On both the right and left walls of Cave 7, three bodhisattvas sit facing the center of the cave. Four columns were constructed on each corner of the platform. Eight arhats are found on the back of both northwest and northeast columns.	Some of the faces are destroyed; the head of the Bodhisattva Mañjuśrī on the platform is missing. Most statues are well preserved, and some still have colors on them.
Cave 8	Depth: 4.6 m (15 ft), Width: 5.6 m (18 ft), Height: 1.1 m (3 ft 7 in)	Uncertain	Cave for Meditation	No statues	
Cave 9	Depth: 8.7 m (29 ft), Width: 5.4 m (18 ft), Height: 3.7 m (12 ft)	No later than Qing dynasty, 5th year of Daoguang (1825 CE)	Cave for Worship	Symbols of different flowers and animals were sculpted on the back wall. No other statues.	
Cave 10	Depth: 0.88 m (2 ft 11 in), Width: 1.8 m (5 ft 11 in), Height: 0.85 m (2 ft 9 in)	Uncertain	Cave for Burial	No statues	

=== Important caves ===
The sixth and seventh caves from the east are the most important caves.

==== Cave 6 ====
According to the inscription on the east wall, Cave 6 was constructed no later than 608 CE. It is connected to the front Cave 7. The east wall of the cave is roughly divided into two rows of a total of eight statues: five in the top row and three in the bottom row. The top row consists of three buddhas—one seated—and two attendants. The second row contains four seated buddha statues. There are seven inscriptions in Cave 6, five legible and two poorly preserved.

==== Cave 7 ====
Cave 7 is the largest among the Shihong Temple Caves. It was constructed in the Jin dynasty (1115–1234) with its main purpose as worship. There are a total of 29 inscriptions on the walls, columns, and ceiling. These inscriptions mainly introduce the history and people who funded the construction of the caves.

== Importance and Historical Protection ==
As one of the four most important caves in Shaanxi, the Shihong Temple Caves are large and rich in high-quality statues, which represent northern Chinese Buddhist caves from the Song to Qing dynasties. The caves preserve a total of over 3,000 statues and 49 inscriptions from the Sui, Tang, Song, Jin, Ming, and Qing dynasties.

Numerous statues' faces were damaged during the Cultural Revolution by the Red Guards. However, now that the Chinese government has recognized the importance of these caves, and the State Bureau of Cultural Relics has been assigned to protect the caves.

On April 20, 1992, Shihong Temple Caves were included in the third batch of List of Major National Historical and Cultural Sites in Shaanxi. On May 25, 2005, the sixth batch of Major Historical and Cultural Site Protected at the National Level was announced, and the Shihong Temple Caves were included in the list.

== See also ==
- Chinese Buddhism
