= Huaqing Pool =

Hot springs complex near Xi'an, China

- Huaqing Palace
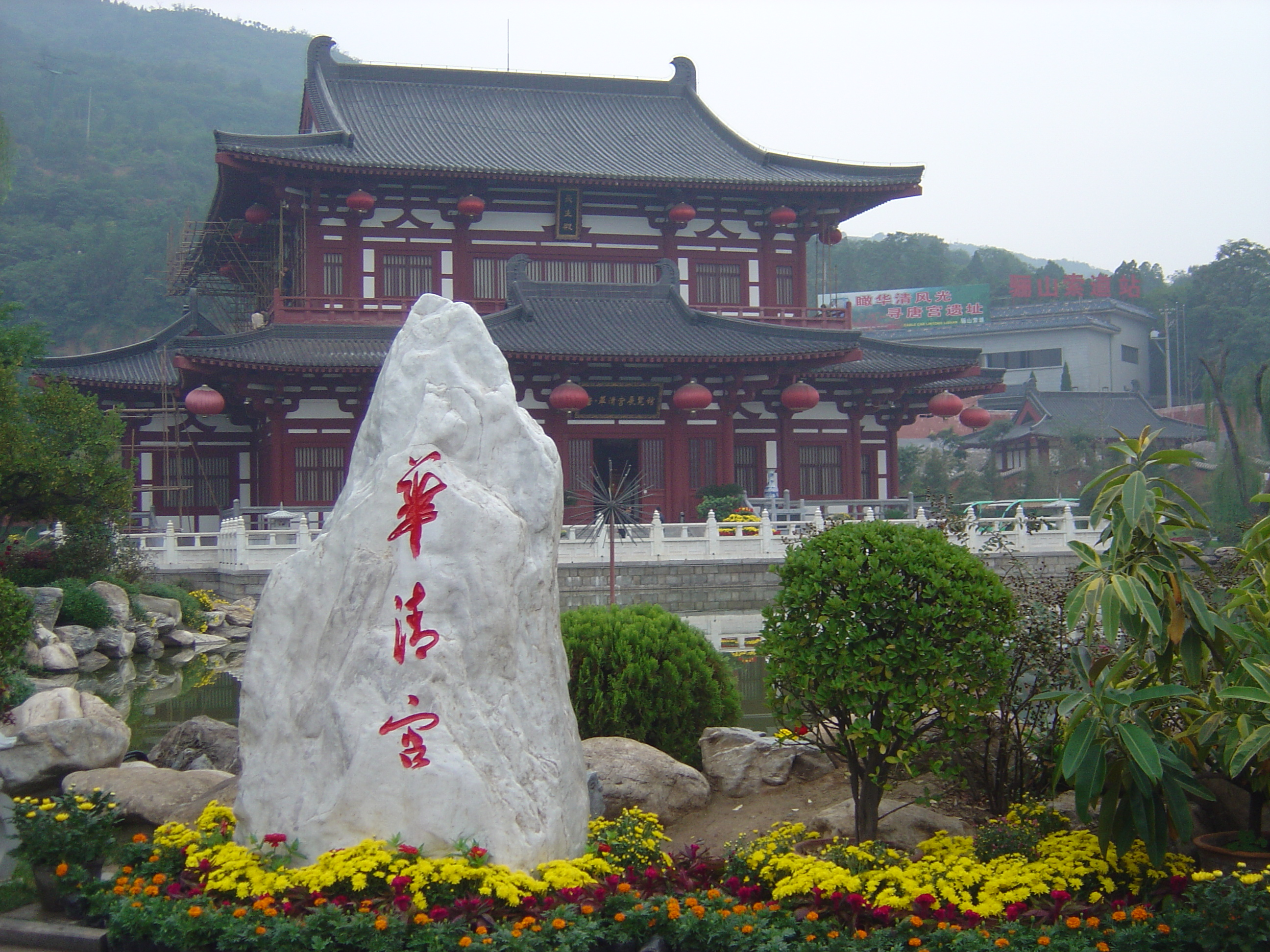
- Stone carving Huaqing Palace.
- Interactive map of Huaqing Pool
- Location: Mount Li, Qinling, Xi'an, Shaanxi, China
- Coordinates: 34°21′54″N 109°12′26″E

Huaqing Pool
- Traditional Chinese: 華清池
- Simplified Chinese: 华清池
Transcriptions
Standard Mandarin
- Hanyu Pinyin: Huáqīng chí
- Wade–Giles: Hua^{2}-ch'ing^{1} chih^{2}
- IPA: [xwǎtɕʰíŋ ʈʂʰɨ̌]
Yue: Cantonese
- Yale Romanization: Wàah-chīng chìh
- Jyutping: Waa^{4}-cing^{1} ci^{4}
Southern Min
- Tâi-lô: Huâ-tshing tî (lit.)

The Huaqing Pool (华清池), also known as the Huaqing Palace (华清宫), is a complex of imperial gardens known for its hot springs at the northern foot of Mount Li, Qinling, approximately 25 kilometers (16 mi) east of Xi'an, Shaanxi, China.

== History ==
The permanent springs that constitute the Huaqing Pool utilize naturally occurring geothermal heat and have a documented history of almost three millennia, having served as the site of several palaces built by past Chinese rulers, including King You of the Zhou dynasty, Qin Shi Huang of the Qin dynasty, and Emperor Wu of the Han dynasty, who expanded the complex.

Under the Tang dynasty, Emperor Xuanzong renovated the complex as Wenquan Palace in 723 and renamed it Huaqing Palace in 747; the site is famous as the setting of Xuanzong's romance with his consort Yang Guifei. The palace suffered considerable damage during the An Lushan Rebellion, though its legacy has received lasting commemoration, including in Bai Juyi's Chang Hen Ge:

春寒賜浴華清池
溫泉水滑洗凝脂
侍兒扶起嬌無力
始是新承恩澤時

Translation:

On a cold spring day, he bestowed upon her the honor of bathing with him at the Huaqing Pool.
The waters of the hot springs were smooth, and washed over her pale white skin.
The palace maids helped her to leave the pool, for she was too delicate to stand.
This was when she began to receive the emperor's favour.

This site was also the scene of the 1936 Xi'an Incident, when Chiang Kai-shek was kidnapped by generals Zhang Xueliang and Yang Hucheng, who forced him into a United Front with the Chinese Communist Party to oppose Imperial Japan.

== Present ==
The Huaqing Pool is today a popular tourist spot, managed by the Shaanxi Tourism Group and classified as an AAAAA scenic area by the China National Tourism Administration.

== Gallery ==
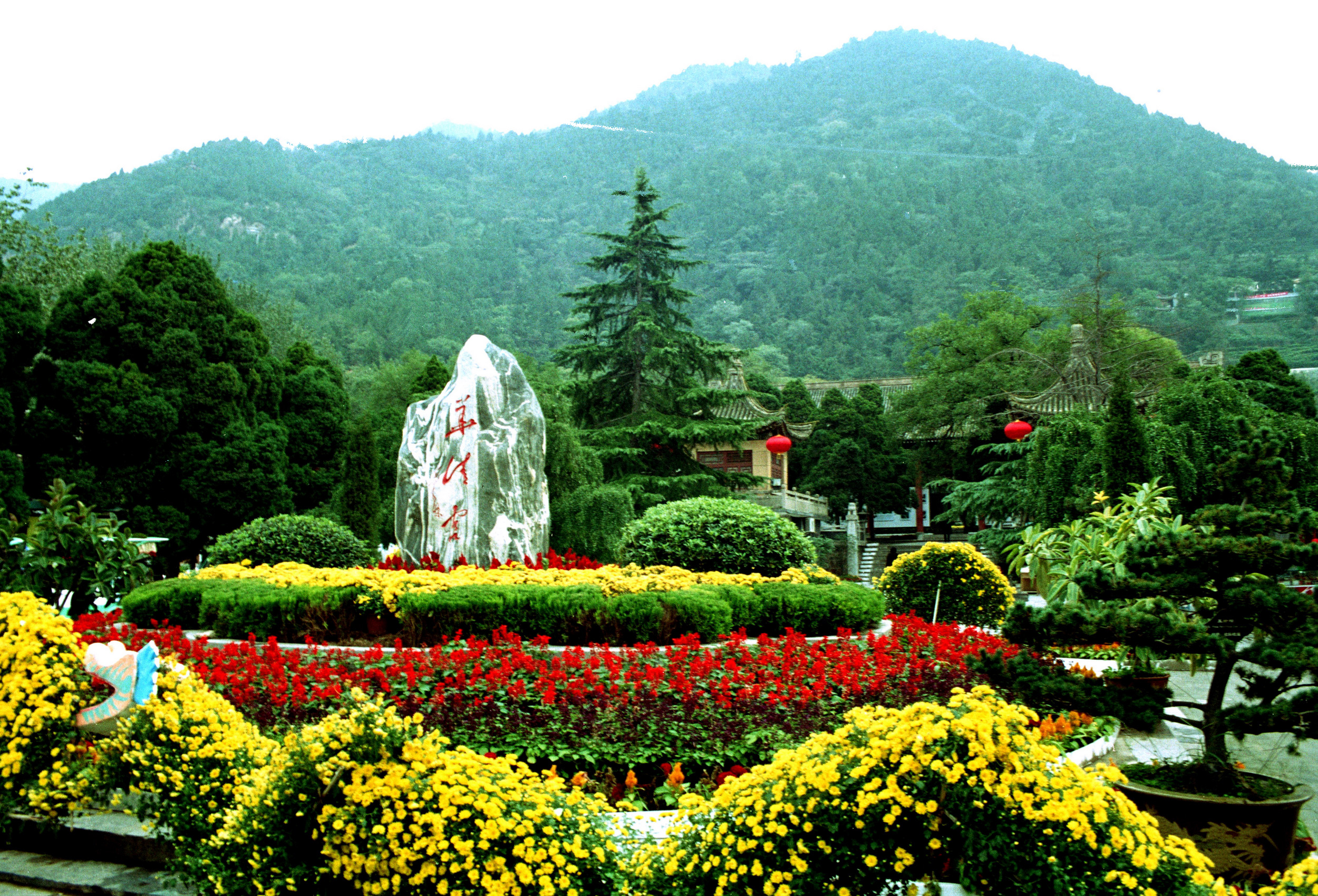
Huaqing Palace

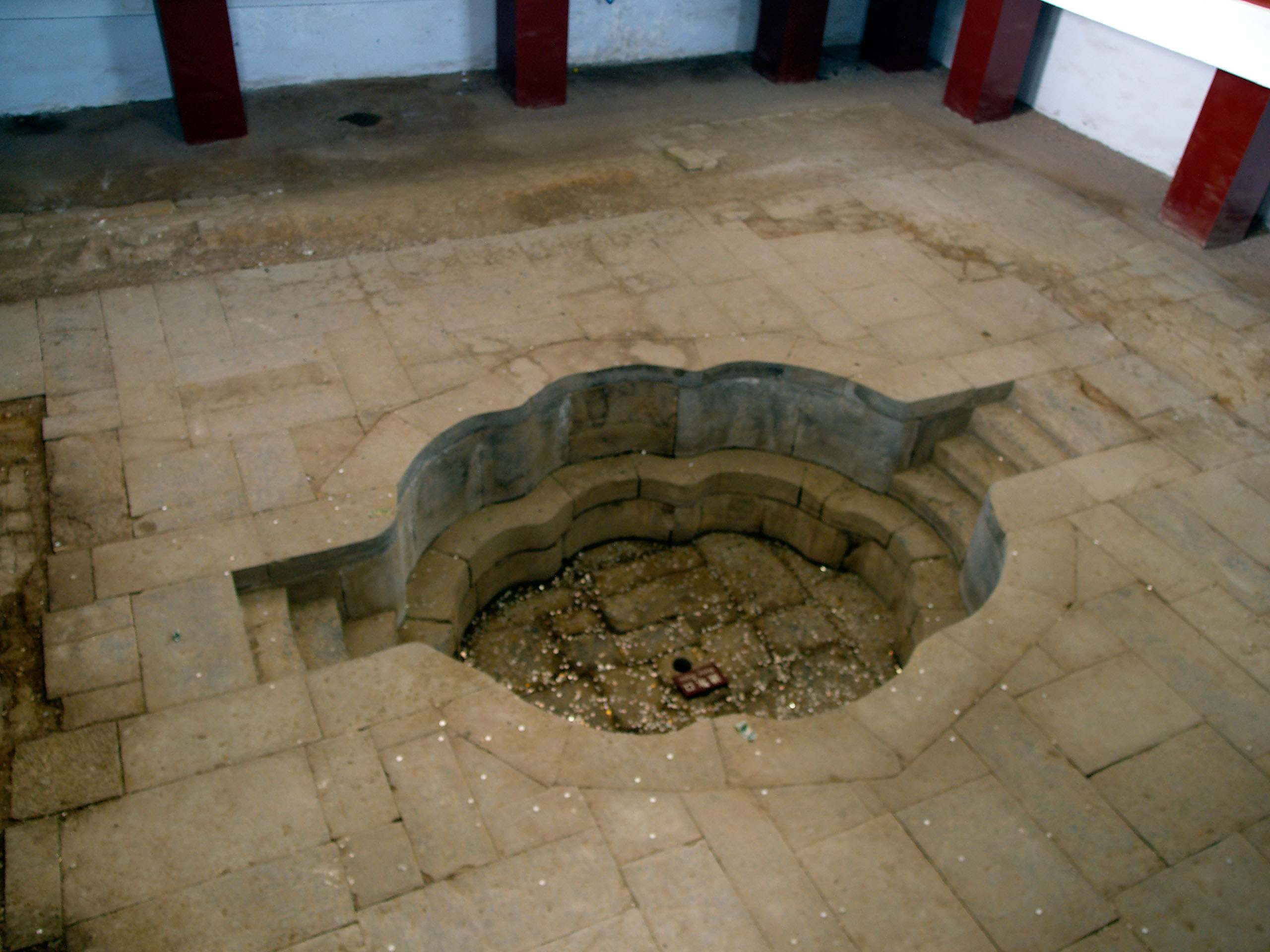
Guifei Pond (貴妃湯)

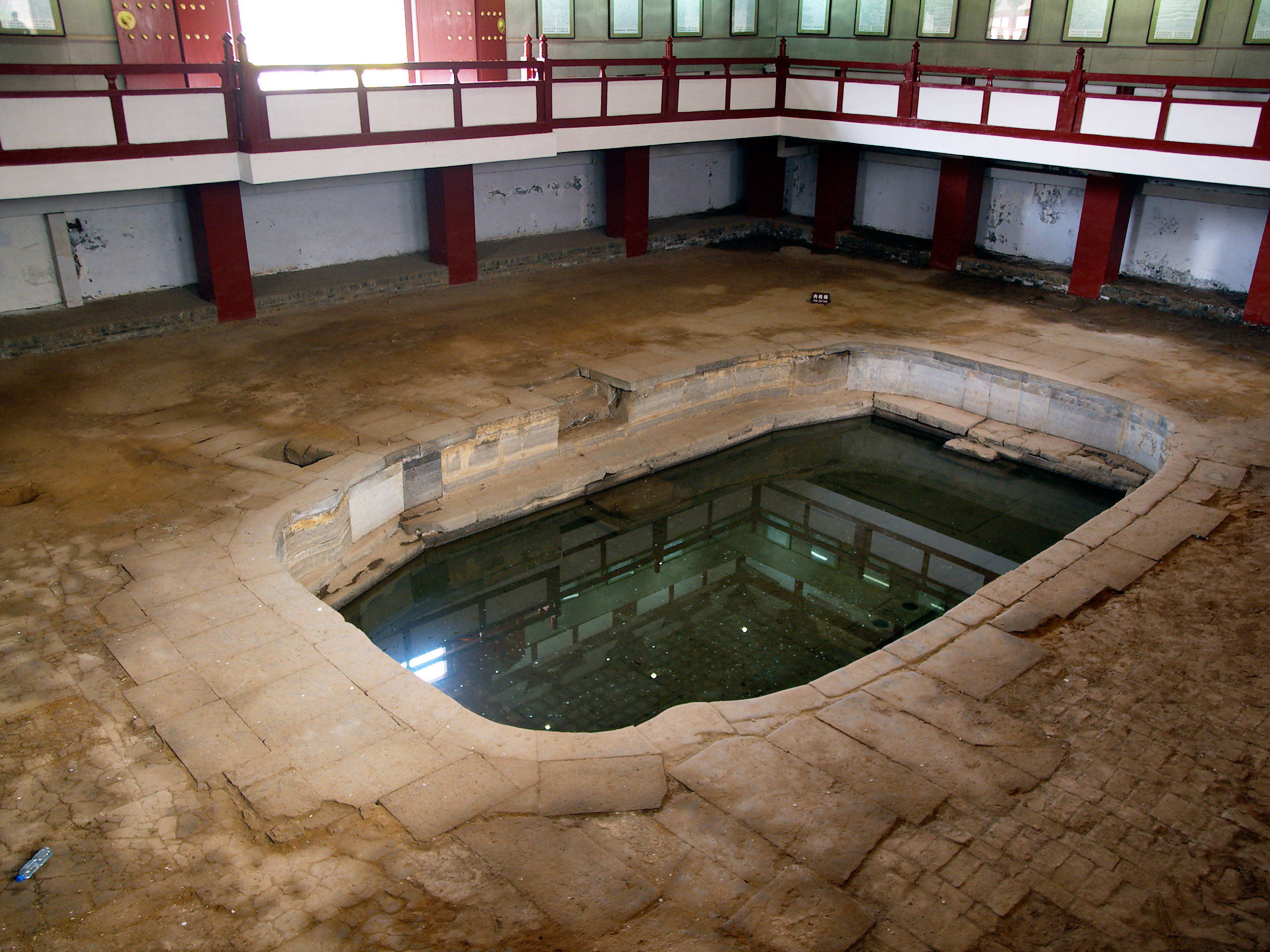
Lianhua Pond (蓮花湯)

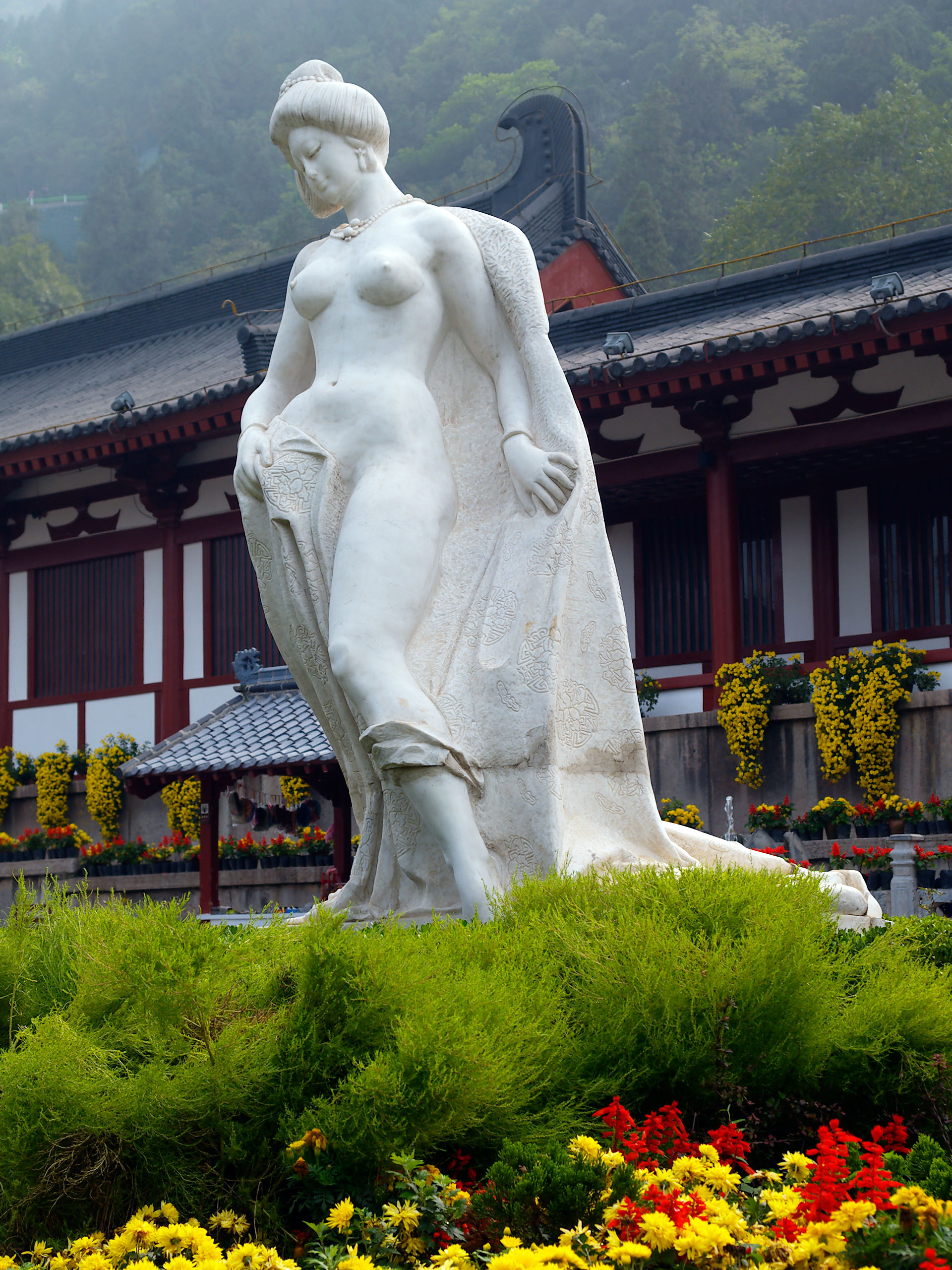
Statue of Yang Guifei coming out of the bath

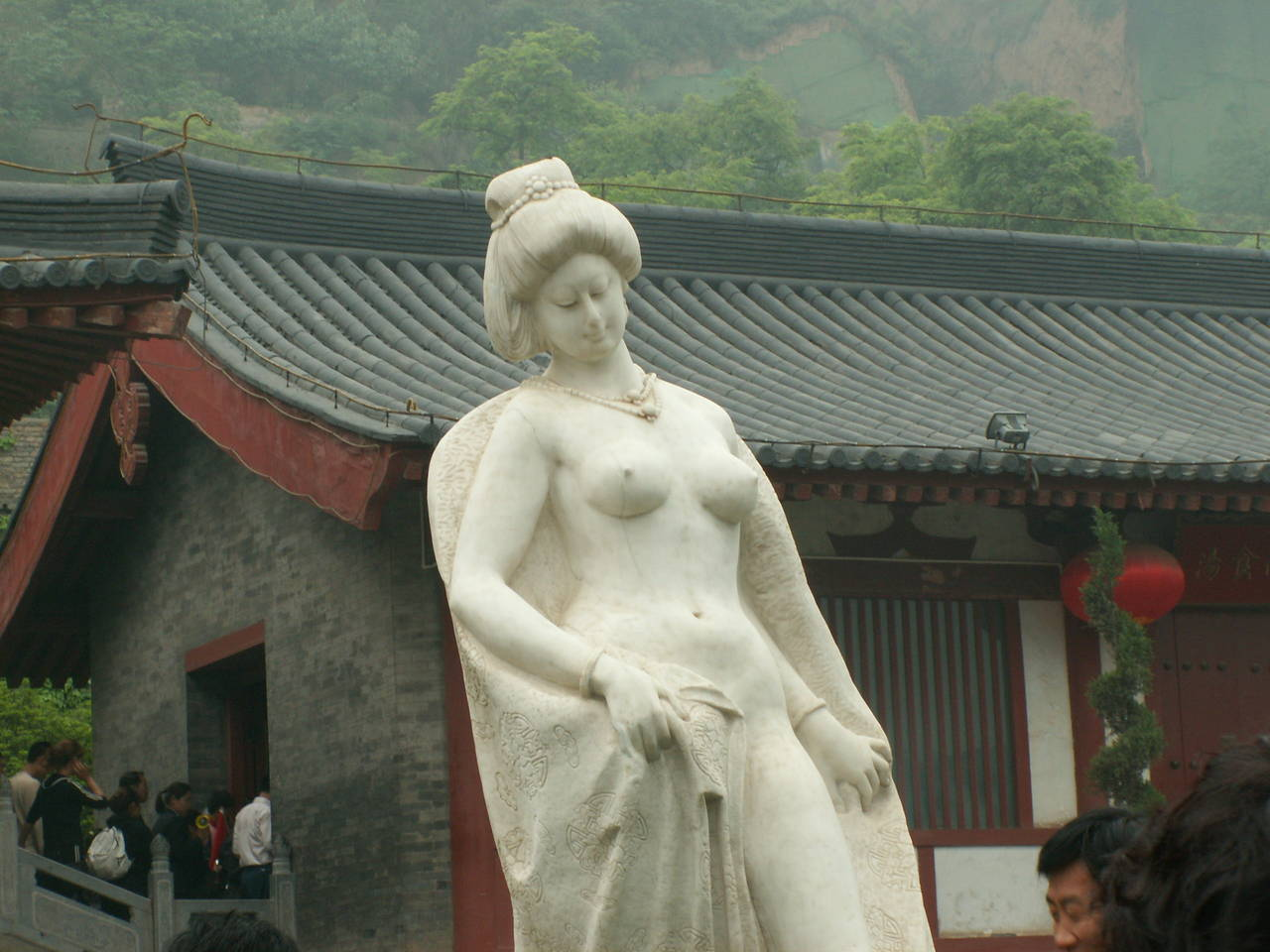
Statue of Yang Guifei coming out of the bath

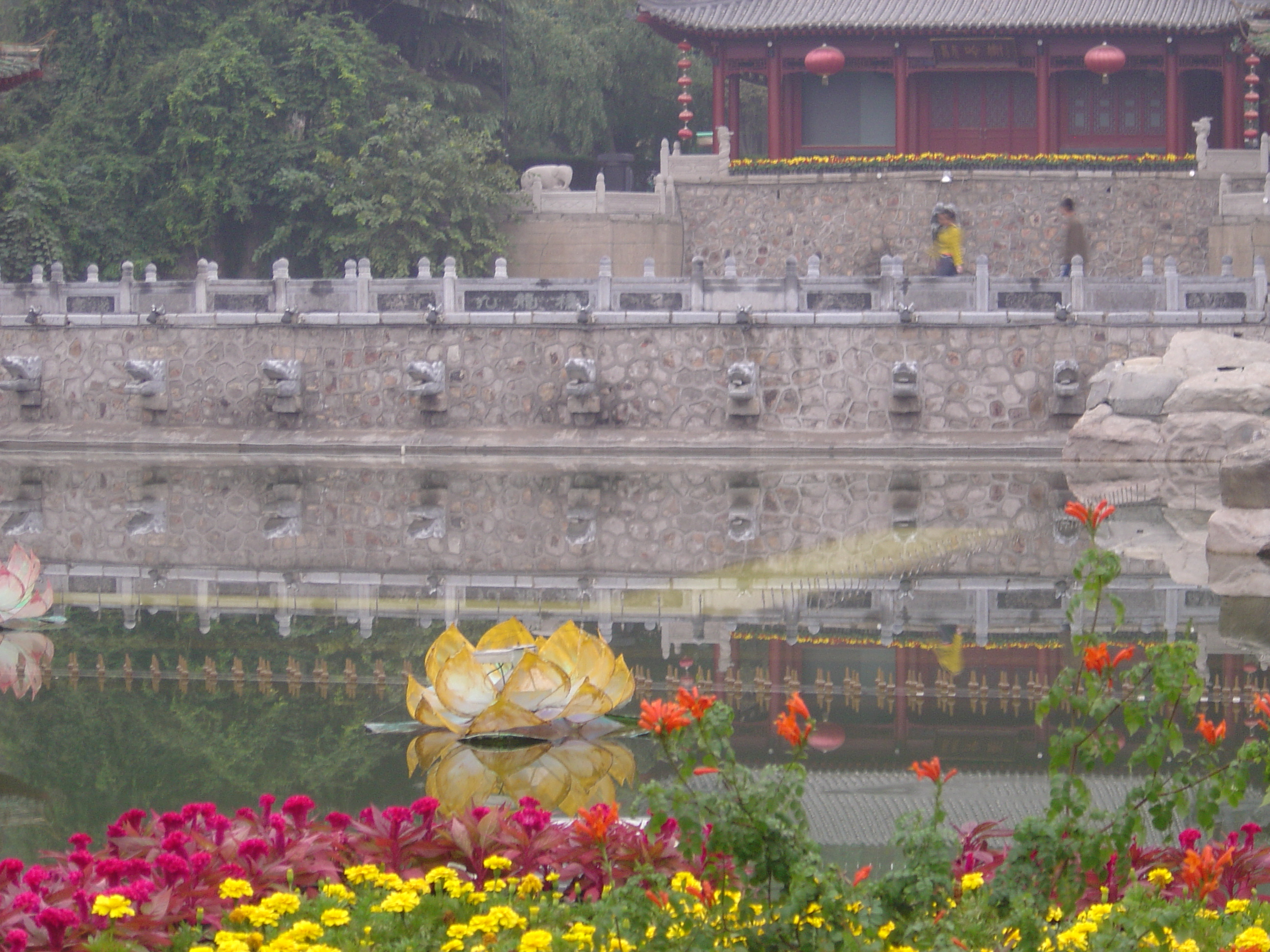
Huaqing Pool with artificial lotus

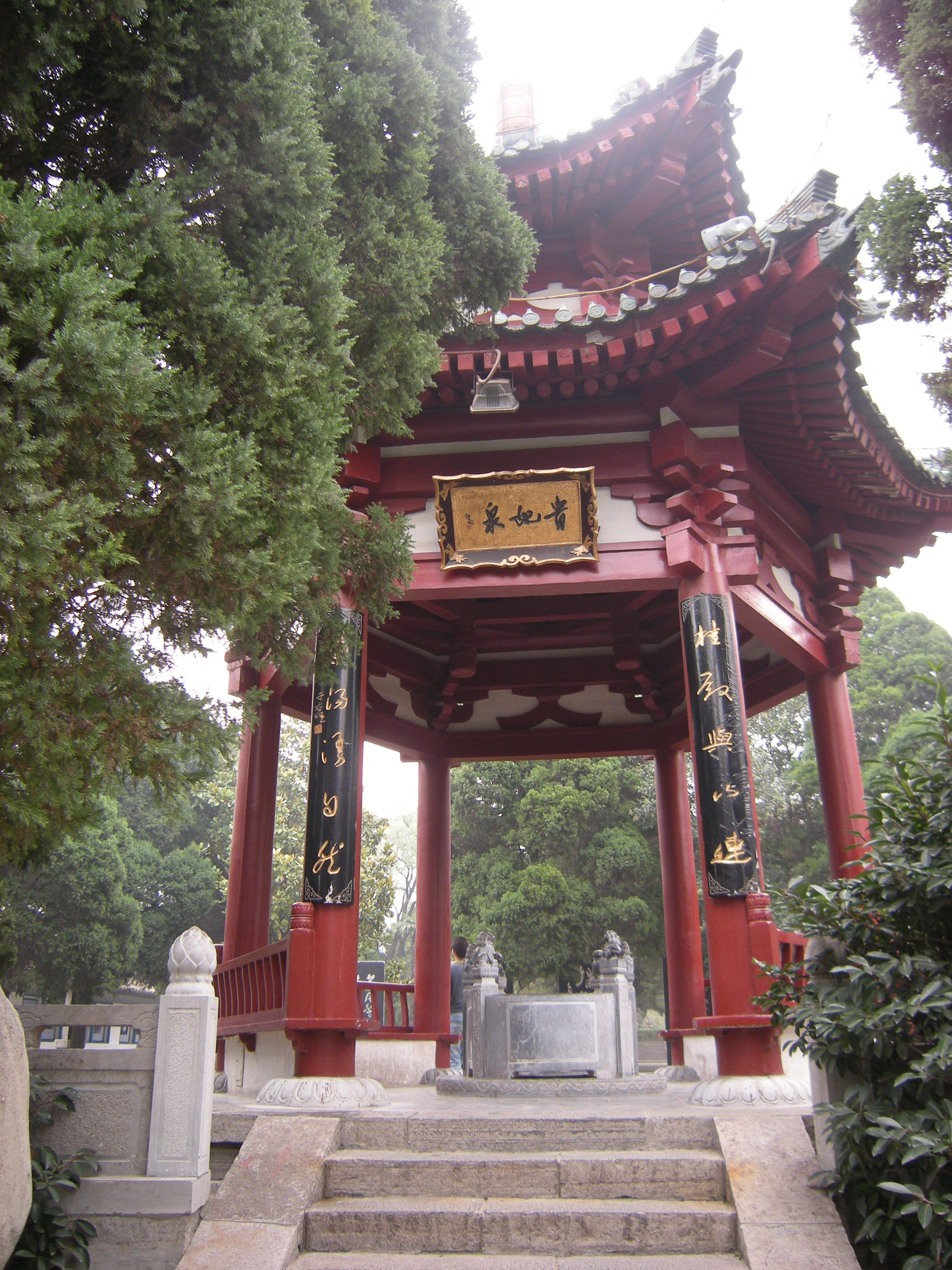
Guifei Spring ('The Lady's Spring')

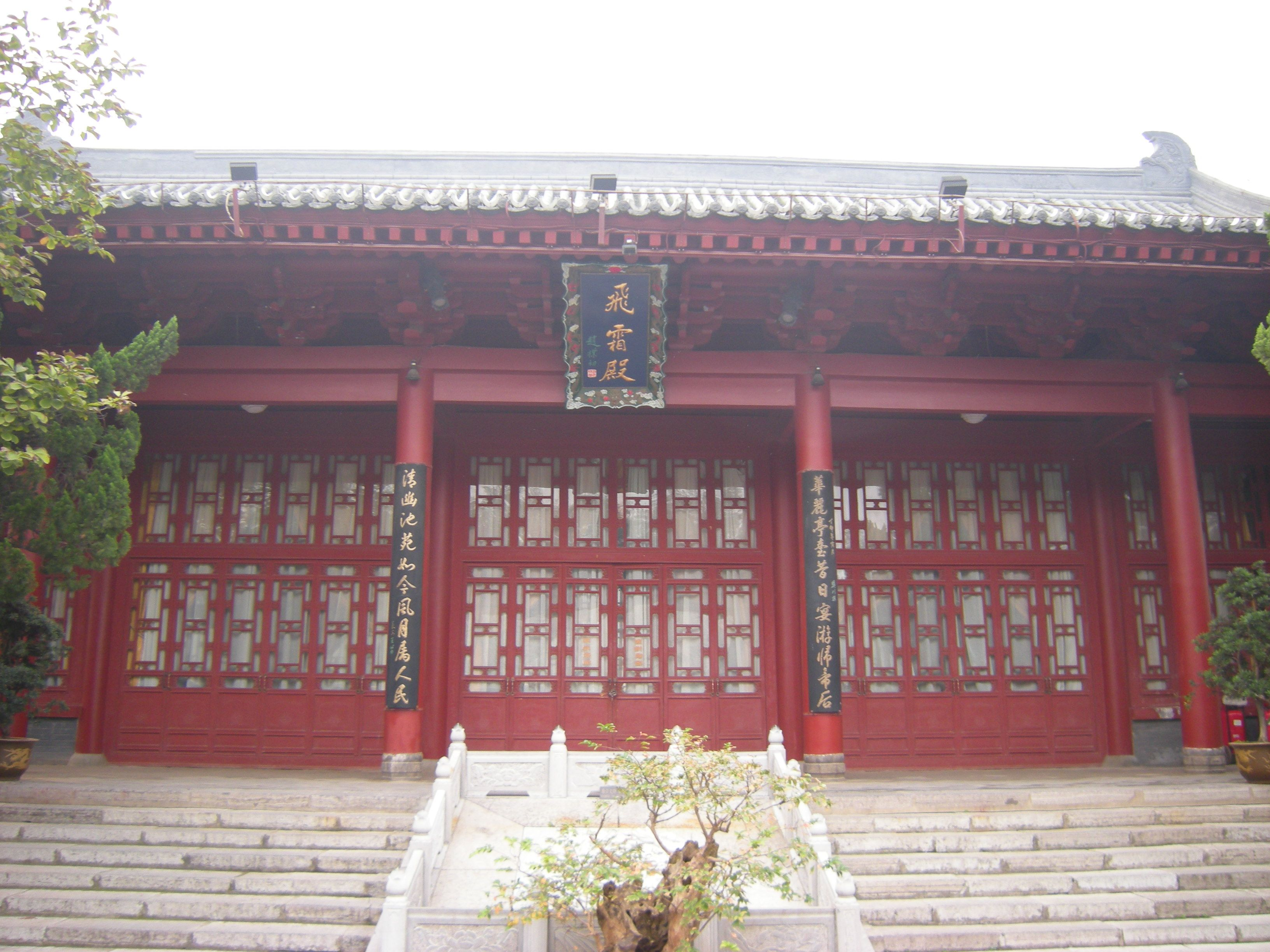
Feishuang Hall ('Hall of the Drifting Frost')

One of the Huaqing Pool's murals

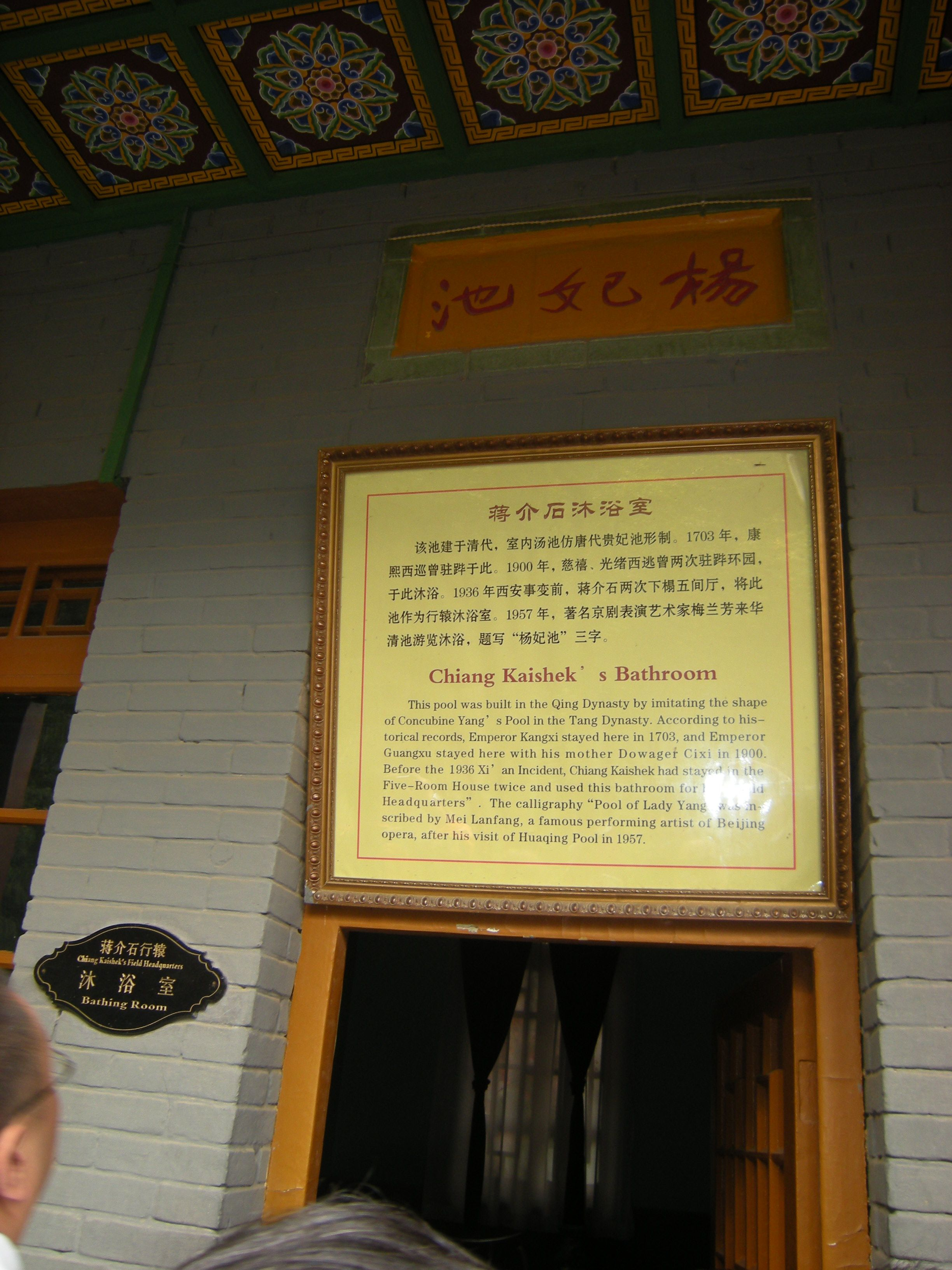
"Lady Yang's Pool", a reconstructed Qing version, later used by Chiang Kai-shek
