= Dangjia village =

Dangjia 党家村
- Village
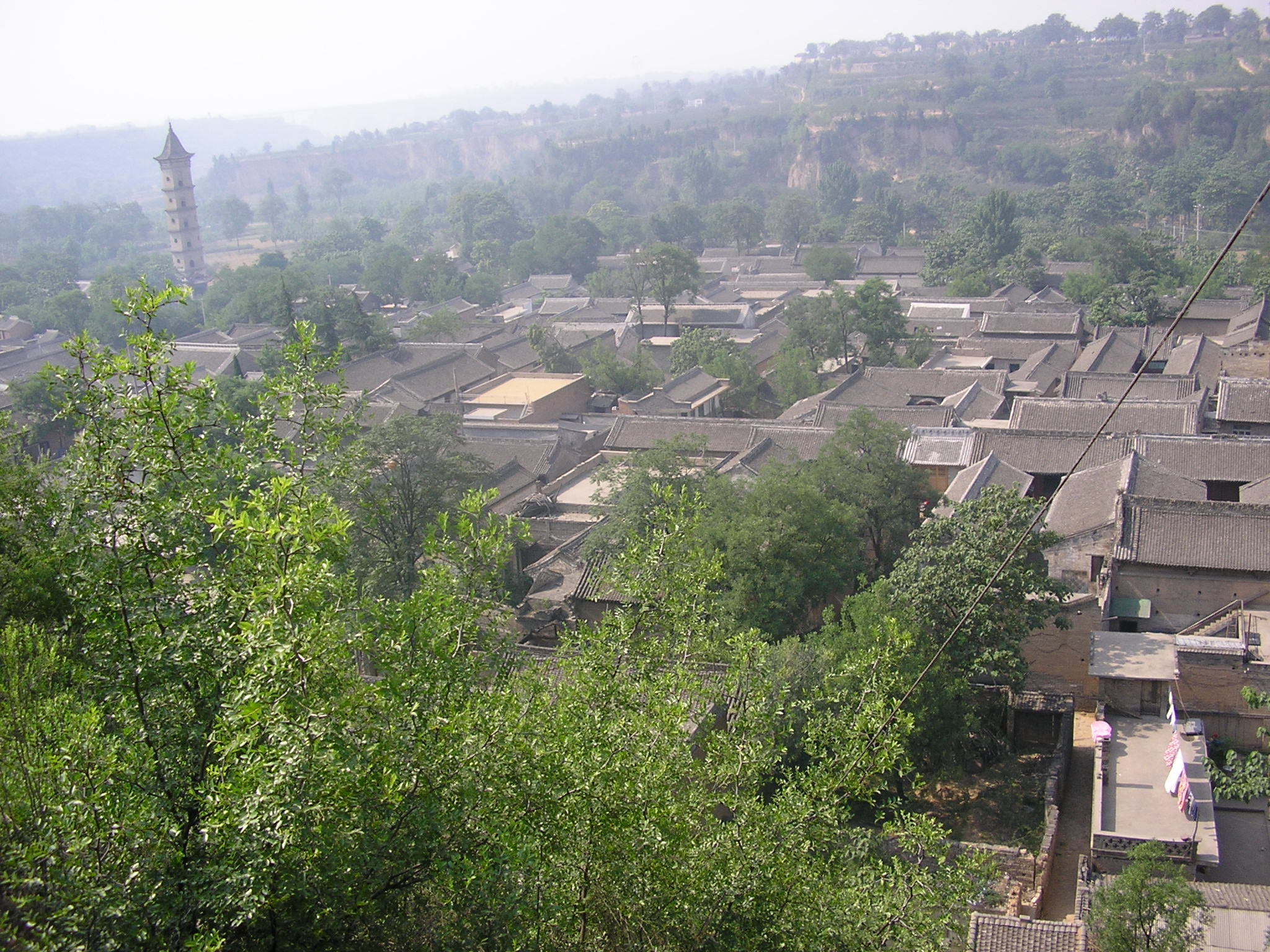
- Skyline of Dangjia
- Interactive map of Dangjia
- Coordinates: 35°31′38″N 110°28′35″E
- Country: People's Republic of China
- Province: Shaanxi
- Prefecture-level city: Weinan
- Sub-prefectural city: Hancheng
- Town: Xizhuang

Dangjia village (Chinese: 党家村), is located in Xizhuang (西庄镇), which is northeast of Hancheng, Weinan, Shaanxi province. And is 9 kilometers away from the southwest of the New City in Hancheng, 1.5 kilometers west of 108 State Road, and 3.5 kilometers east of the Yellow River.

== History ==
Dangjia village was founded in 1331, located in east–west gourd-shaped valley, and the village looks like a boat, whose housing construction in line with the traditional yin and yang gossip. There were more than 330 households and 1400 people in the village at that time. The existing courtyard reached to 123 now. In April 1989, the village demolished a 300-year-old theater building. The main existing buildings are old stone roadway, various buildings, stately ancestral temple, tall and straight Wenxingge and courtyard house. And the buildings are decorated by exquisite lintel, wood carving, brick carving. Besides, there are ancient defensive system such as City walls, Biyang Fort, and mezzanine guarding. The study value of Dangjia village lies mainly in the following aspects. First, it possess the function of living, producing and defensive structure of rural settlements in ancient China. Second, the Zhai-Baos is separated from the village, which is the most unique form of village found in China so far. Thirdly, the middle and upper room (living room) of Hancheng Courtyard, represented by Dangjia village, is not a space for daily living, but a dignified and bright ceremonial space and sacrificial space. And the space of "one bright and two dark rooms separated" widely used in northern dwelling houses, rarely used in Hancheng.
