= Xiangji Temple (Shaanxi) =

Buddhist temple in Shaanxi, China

- 香积寺
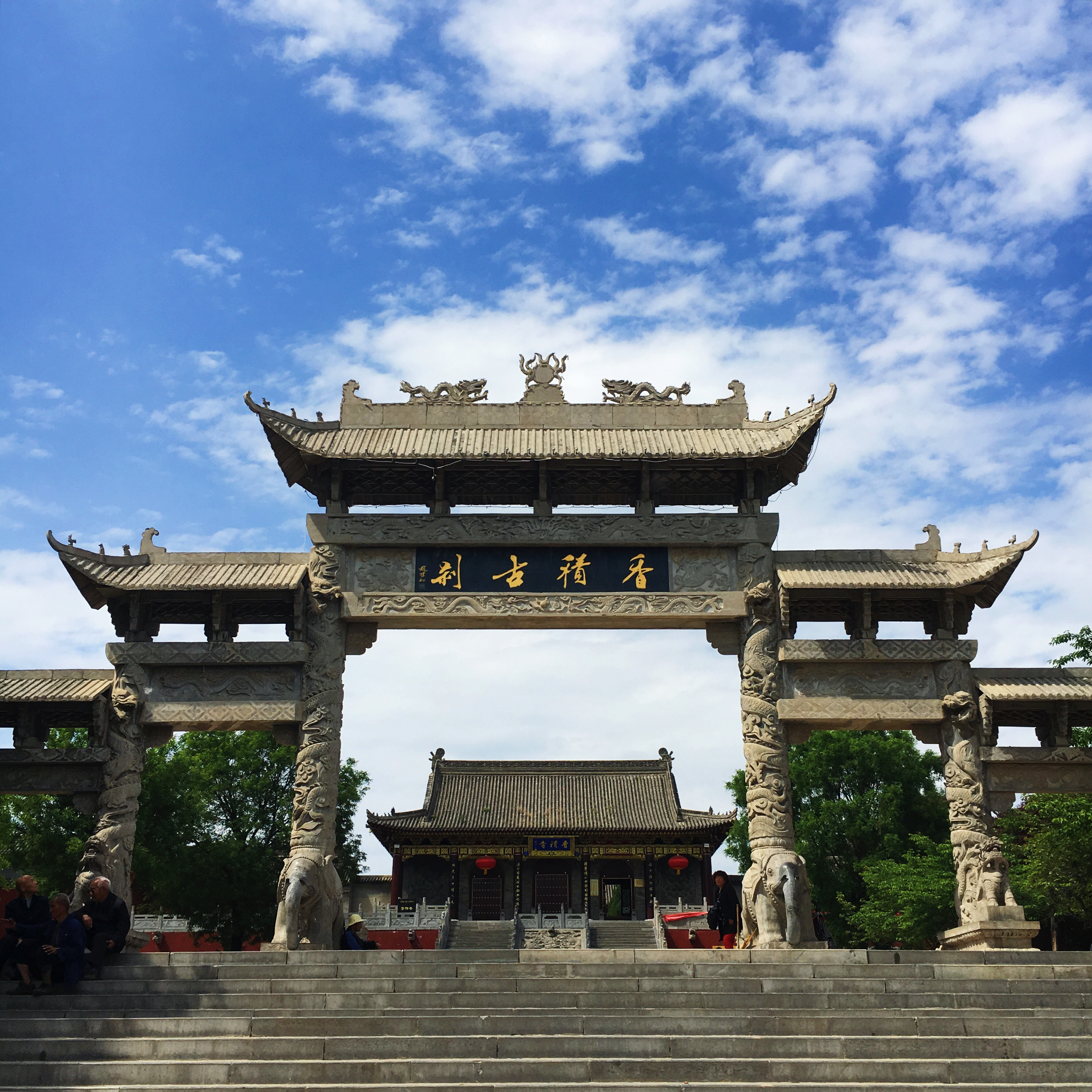

Religion
- Affiliation: Buddhism
- Sect: Pure Land Buddhism
- Leadership: Shi Benchang (释本昌)

Location
- Location: Chang'an District, Xi'an, Shaanxi
- Country: China
- Interactive map of Xiangji Temple
- Coordinates: 34°07′40″N 108°53′58″E

Architecture
- Style: Chinese architecture
- Founder: Huaiyun (怀恽)
- Established: 681

Xiangji Temple (simplified Chinese: 香积寺; traditional Chinese: 香積寺; pinyin: Xiāngjī Sì, The Temple of Accumulated Fragrances) is a Buddhist temple located in Chang'an District of Xi'an, Shaanxi. The temple is regarded as the cradle of Pure Land Buddhism.

== Name ==
The name of the temple is cited from the Vimalakirti Sutra.

== History ==
=== Tang dynasty ===
In 681, during the reign of Emperor Gaozong of Tang dynasty (618–907), master Shandao, the founder of Pure Land Buddhism, died. To commemorate Shandao, his disciple Huaiyun (怀恽) established the temple, which became the first temple of Pure Land Buddhism. At that time, the emperor gave thousands of Sariras to the temple. When the poet and official Wang Wei visited the temple, he wrote a poem Visiting Xiangji Temple (过香积寺) to eulogize the beautiful scenery. Xiangji Temple was badly damaged in the An Lushan Rebellion, especially during the eponymous Battle of Xiangji Temple. In 840, when Taoist believer Emperor Wuzong ascended the throne, he presided over the destruction of tens of thousands of temples, and confiscate temple lands and force monks to return to secular life. Xiangji Temple was devastated in the Great Anti-Buddhist Persecution.

=== Song dynasty ===
In the Song dynasty (960–1279), Pure Land Buddhism continued to prevail in China. In 978, in the 3rd year of Taiping Xingguo period of the Northern Song dynasty (960–1127), the temple was renamed "Kaili Temple" (开立寺). But it restored the original name soon.

=== Ming dynasty ===
Xiangji Temple was renovated and refurbished in the Jiajing era of the Ming dynasty (1368–1644).

=== Qing dynasty ===
In 1768, in the 32rd year of Qianlong period of the Qing dynasty (1644–1911), monks repaired the temple. In the Tongzhi period (1862–1874), the temple was completely destroyed in the Dungan Revolt (1862–1877).

=== People's Republic of China ===
1956, it was listed among the first batch of provincial level key cultural heritage by the Shaanxi Provincial Government.

After the 3rd plenary session of the 11th Central Committee of the Chinese Communist Party, With the support of the Chinese government, local authorities began to reconstruct the temple.

It has been designated as a National Key Buddhist Temple in Han Chinese Area by the State Council of China in 1984.

On June 25, 2001, it was classified as a "Major National Historical and Cultural Sites" by the State Council of China.

== Architecture ==
The temple complex is located in the north and faces the south. Along the central axis of the temple stand five buildings including the Paifang, Shanmen, Tianwang Dian, Mahavira Hall, Fatang.

=== Shanmen ===
Under the eaves is a plaque with the Chinese characters "Xiangji Temple" written by the former Venerable Master of the Buddhist Association of China Zhao Puchu.

=== Mahavira Hall ===
The Mahavira Hall is the main hall in the temple. The statue of the bodhisattva Mi Le is enshrined in the center. On both sides of the hall there are two stone lamps.

=== Dharma Hall ===
In the middle of the hall placed the statue of Shijiamouni Buddha, with Ananda and Kassapa Buddha on the left and right sides.

=== Pagoda of Shandao ===
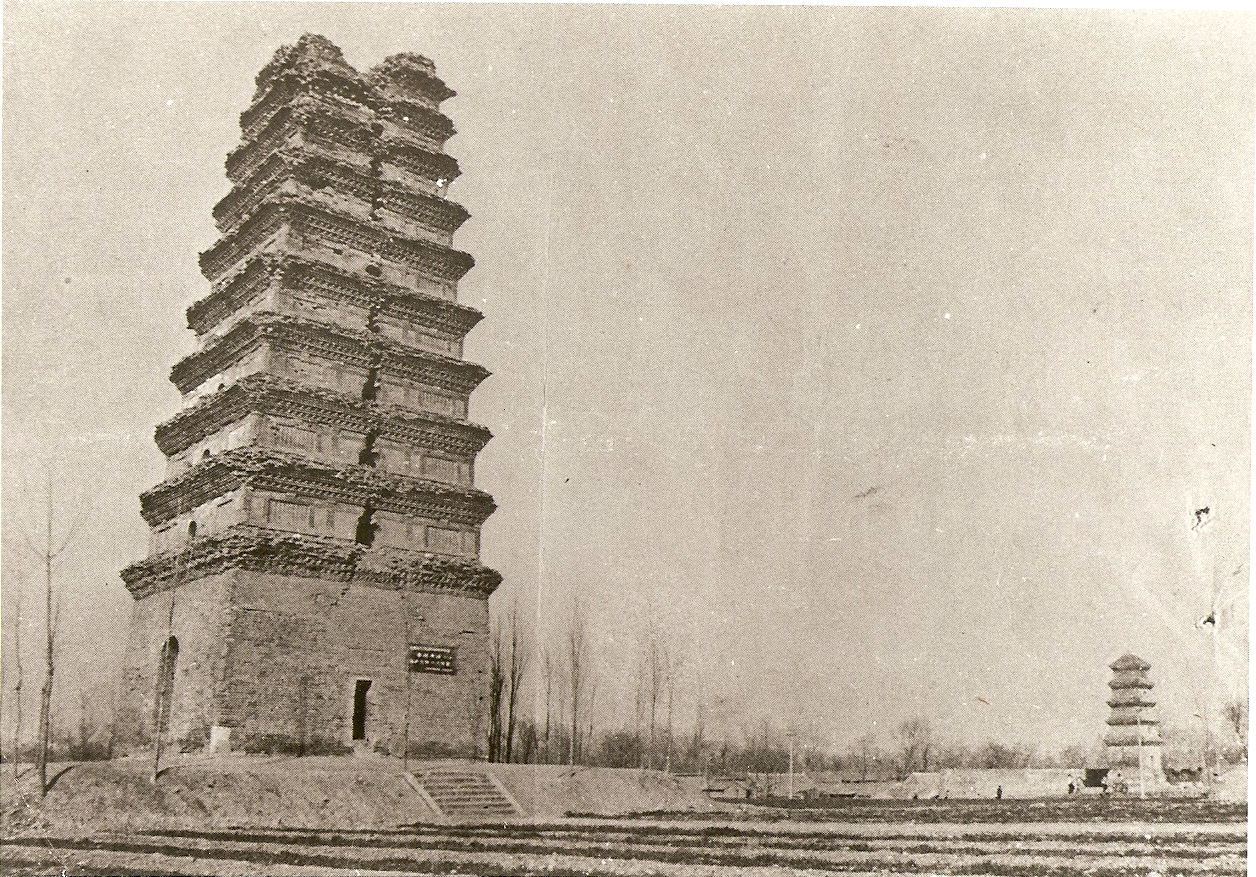
This image was taken in the 1970s before the Pagoda was restored.

The pagoda was built in 681 during the early Tang dynasty (618–907). The 33-metre (108 ft) pagoda has the brick structure with eleven stories and four sides. Curved bars and cornices are set on each story, which are magnificent and become the symbol of Xiangji Temple.

== Cultural relics ==
The Tang dynasty (618–907) reliefs of Four Heavenly Kings was lost to the United States in 1920 and is now in the Museum of Fine Arts, Boston.
