= Xiangji Temple (Zhejiang) =

Buddhist temple in Hangzhou, Zhejiang, China

- 香积寺
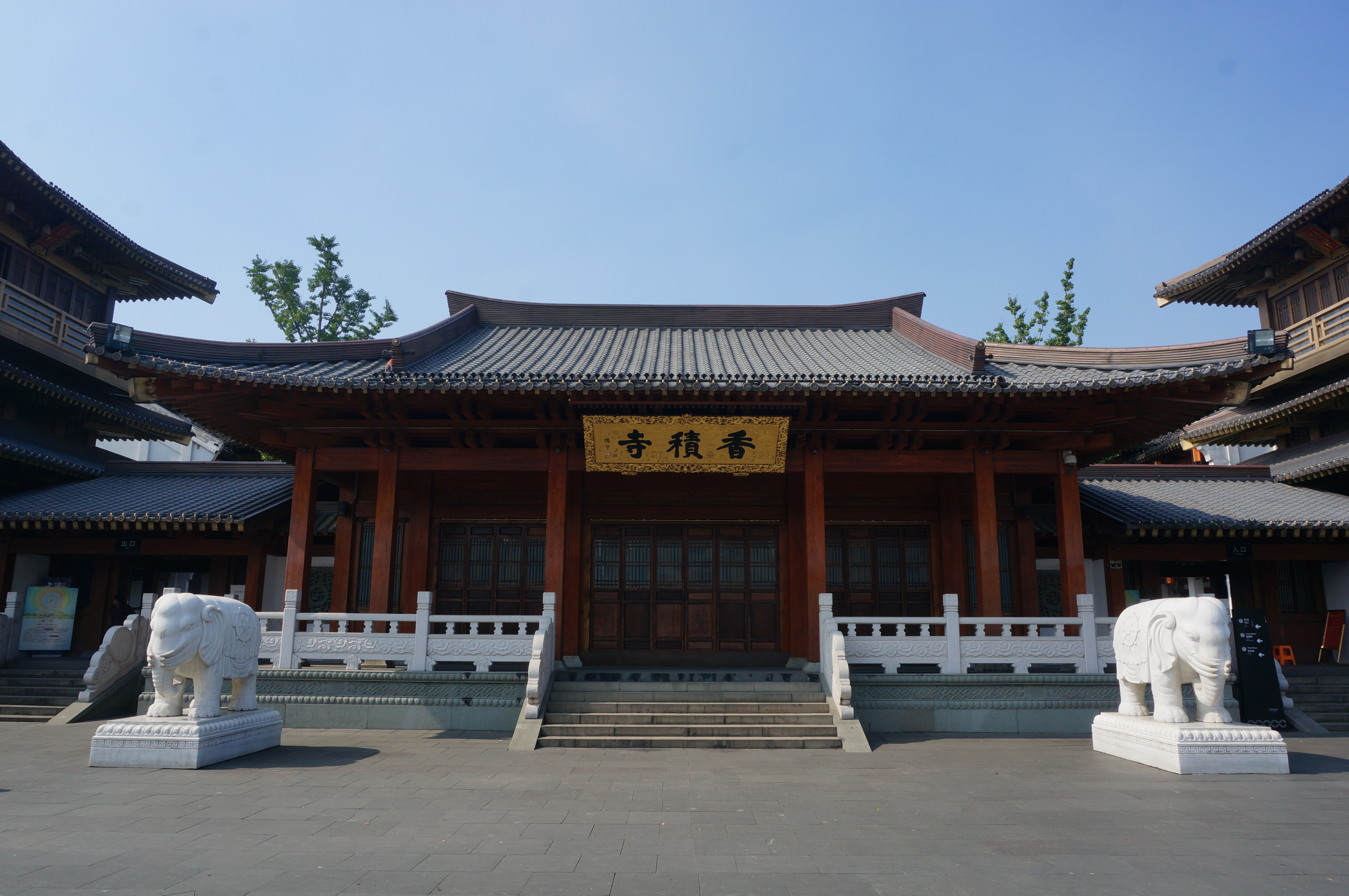
- Xiangji Temple.

- Location within Zhejiang Location within China

Religion
- Affiliation: Buddhism
- Deity: Chan Buddhism

Location
- Location: Gongshu District, Hangzhou, Zhejiang
- Country: China
- Interactive map of Xiangji Temple
- Coordinates: 30°18′16″N 120°09′12″E

Architecture
- Style: Chinese architecture
- Established: 978
- Completed: 2009 (reconstruction)

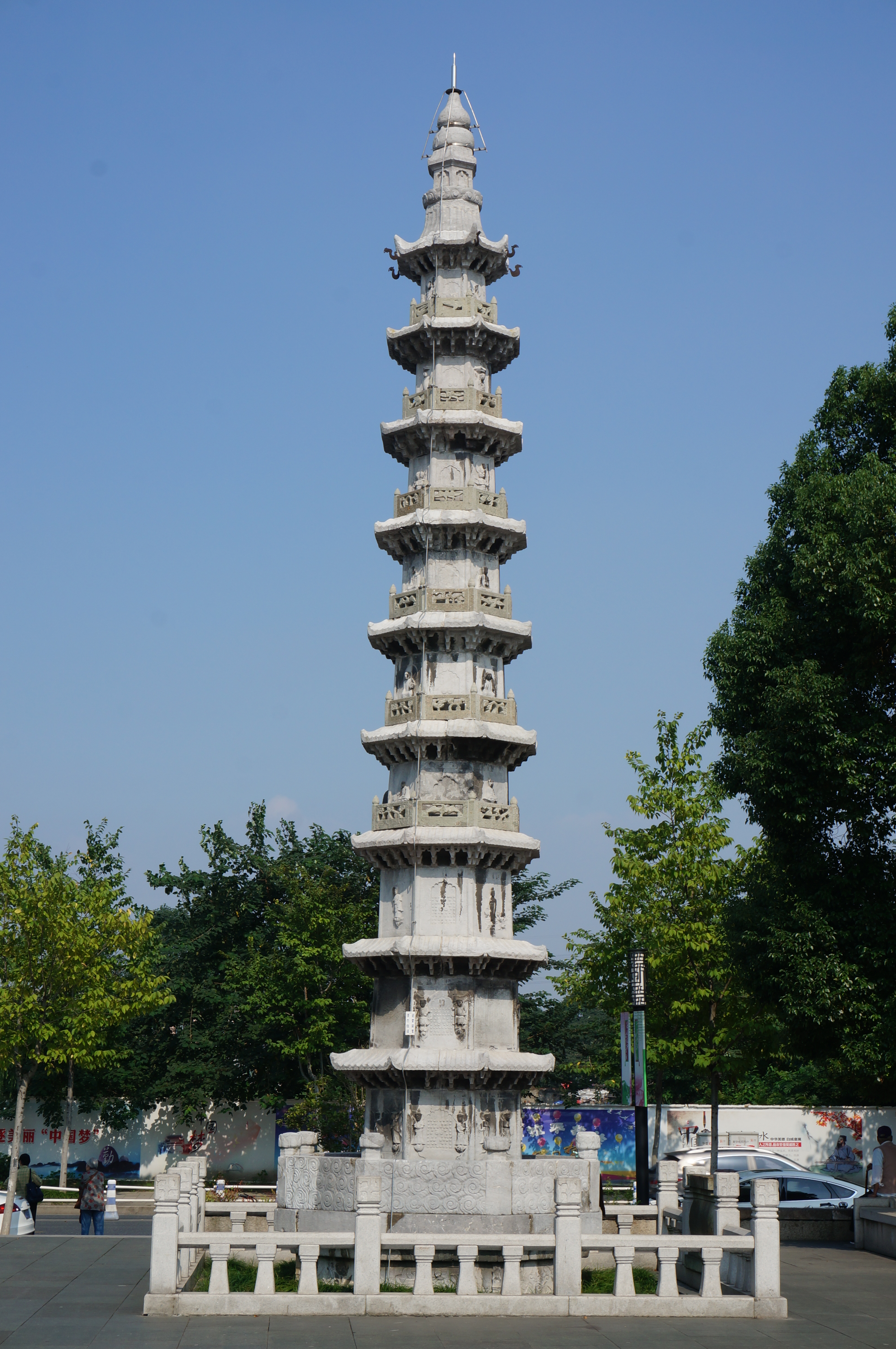
The Western Pagoda at Xiangji Temple.

Xiangji Temple (simplified Chinese: 香积寺; traditional Chinese: 香積寺; pinyin: Xiāngjī Sì) is a Buddhist temple located in Gongshu District of Hangzhou, Zhejiang, China.

== History ==
The temple was first construction as "Xingfu Temple" (兴福寺) in 978 and given its present name "Xiangji Temple" in the reign of Emperor Zhenzong of the Northern Song dynasty (960–1127).

The temple was destroyed by fire in the 13th century during the fall of the Yuan dynasty (1271–1368).

In 1713, in the Kangxi era of the Qing dynasty (1644–1911), the Eastern Pagoda and West Pagoda were erected in the temple.

In 1963, the two pagodas was classified as municipal level cultural heritages by the Hangzhou Municipal Government.

In 1968, during the Cultural Revolution, the Red Guards had attacked the temple, and the Eastern Pagoda was demolished.

With the support of the local government, a modern restoration of the entire temple complex was carried out in 2009.

== Architecture ==
=== Western Pagoda ===
The nine-story and octagonal-based Chinese pagoda is made of brick and stone. The brick base of the pagoda is shaped as a sumeru pedestal.
