= Hancheng =

County-level and sub-prefectural city in Shaanxi, People's Republic of China

Hancheng 韩城市
- County-level and sub-prefectural city
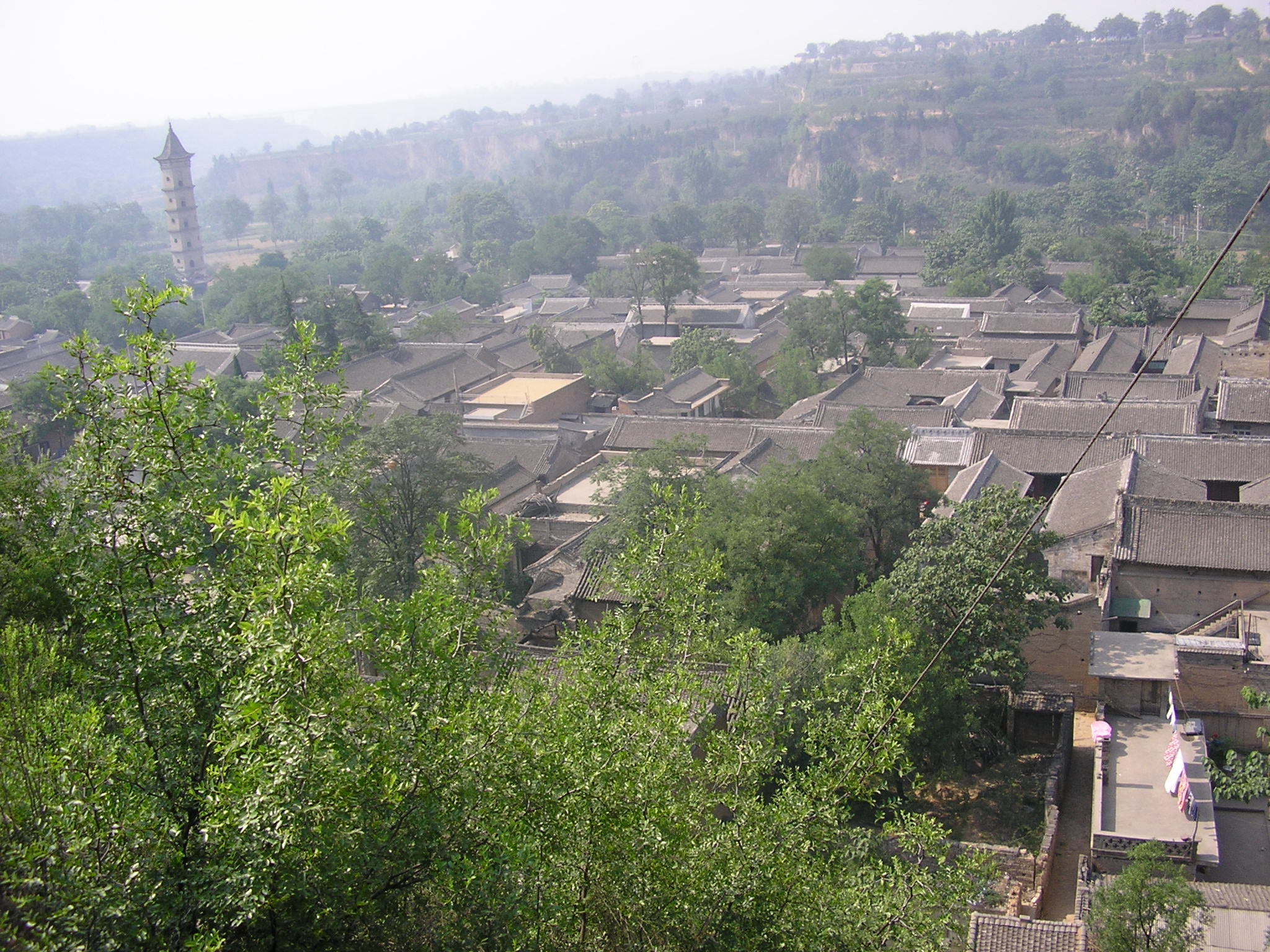
- Skyline of Dangjia village

- Location in the People's Republic of China
- Coordinates: 35°28′N 110°26′E
- Country: People's Republic of China
- Province: Shaanxi
- Prefecture-level city: Weinan

Area
  - Total: 1,621 km^{2} (626 sq mi)

Population (2018)
  - Total: 397,020
  - Density: 244.9/km^{2} (634.3/sq mi)
- Time zone: UTC+8 (China standard time)
- Postal code: 342300
- Area code: 715400

Hancheng (simplified Chinese: 韩城; traditional Chinese: 韓城; pinyin: Hánchéng) is a city in Shaanxi Province, People's Republic of China, about 125 miles northeast of Xi'an, at the point where the south-flowing Yellow River enters the Guanzhong Plain. It is a renowned historic city, containing numerous historic mansions and streets as well as over 140 protected historical sites that range from the Tang to the Qing dynasties. As of 2005, it has a population of around 385,000 people.

== History ==
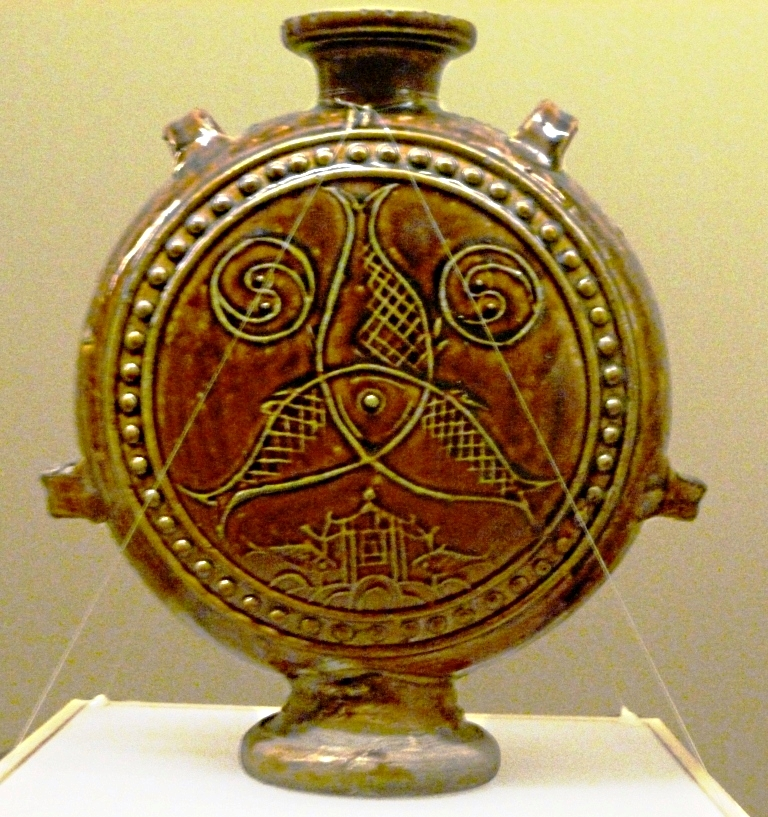
Brown-glazed Jar with Design of Three Fish. Yuan dynasty, 1271–1368 CE. Excavated from Hancheng City

In ancient times, Yu the Great bored a tunnel in the nearby Mount Longmen (Dragon Gate Mountain) to alleviate the frequent flooding that occurred in the area, which led to the area being called Dragon Gate (龍門). During the Western Zhou dynasty, the area was bestowed on the Han Marquises. During the Spring and Autumn period, the area was under the administration of the State of Jin and became known as Hanyuan (韓原) or "Land of the Hans." In the Warring States period, the area belonged to the State of Wei and was called Shaoliang (少梁). Towards the end of the Warring States period, the State of Qin conquered and designated the area as Xiayang County (夏阳县). In the Sui dynasty, the area received its present name of Hancheng.

In 1983, Hancheng County became Hancheng City. In 1986, the city was named a National Historic and Cultural City (国家历史文化名城) and, in 2007, was added to the list of Prime Tourist Cities of China (中国优秀旅游城市).

== Administrative divisions ==
As of 2019, Hancheng City is divided to 3 subdistricts and 6 towns.

Subdistricts

- Xincheng Subdistrict (新城街道)
- Jincheng Subdistrict (金城街道)

Towns

- Longmen (龙门镇)
- Sangshuping (桑树坪镇)
- Zhichuan (芝川镇)
- Xizhuang (西庄镇)
- Zhiyang (芝阳镇)
- Banqiao (板桥镇)

== Climate ==
Climate data for Hancheng, elevation 462 m (1,516 ft), (1991–2020 normals, extremes 1991–present)
Month	Jan	Feb	Mar	Apr	May	Jun	Jul	Aug	Sep	Oct	Nov	Dec	Year
Record high °C (°F)	13.9 (57.0)	20.8 (69.4)	30.2 (86.4)	36.6 (97.9)	38.2 (100.8)	40.4 (104.7)	40.9 (105.6)	38.2 (100.8)	39.2 (102.6)	32.2 (90.0)	24.0 (75.2)	17.2 (63.0)	40.9 (105.6)
Mean daily maximum °C (°F)	4.5 (40.1)	9.2 (48.6)	15.7 (60.3)	22.5 (72.5)	27.4 (81.3)	31.5 (88.7)	32.4 (90.3)	30.5 (86.9)	25.7 (78.3)	19.7 (67.5)	12.4 (54.3)	5.9 (42.6)	19.8 (67.6)
Daily mean °C (°F)	−0.6 (30.9)	3.5 (38.3)	9.6 (49.3)	16.0 (60.8)	21.0 (69.8)	25.3 (77.5)	26.9 (80.4)	25.3 (77.5)	20.4 (68.7)	14.1 (57.4)	7.0 (44.6)	0.8 (33.4)	14.1 (57.4)
Mean daily minimum °C (°F)	−4.6 (23.7)	−0.9 (30.4)	4.6 (40.3)	10.3 (50.5)	15.0 (59.0)	19.7 (67.5)	22.4 (72.3)	21.1 (70.0)	16.1 (61.0)	9.7 (49.5)	2.7 (36.9)	−3.3 (26.1)	9.4 (48.9)
Record low °C (°F)	−15.0 (5.0)	−12.9 (8.8)	−5.9 (21.4)	−1.7 (28.9)	4.7 (40.5)	10.9 (51.6)	15.8 (60.4)	13.5 (56.3)	5.8 (42.4)	−1.8 (28.8)	−11.0 (12.2)	−16.7 (1.9)	−16.7 (1.9)
Average precipitation mm (inches)	7.3 (0.29)	10.5 (0.41)	16.1 (0.63)	33.0 (1.30)	52.5 (2.07)	61.4 (2.42)	94.1 (3.70)	109.4 (4.31)	84.5 (3.33)	45.5 (1.79)	20.0 (0.79)	3.5 (0.14)	537.8 (21.18)
Average precipitation days (≥ 0.1 mm)	2.5	3.2	4.4	5.9	7.2	7.9	9.8	9.5	9.5	7.5	4.8	2.4	74.6
Average snowy days	3.2	2.6	0.9	0.1	0	0	0	0	0	0	1.2	2.3	10.3
Average relative humidity (%)	52	50	48	51	53	56	67	71	71	68	62	54	59
Mean monthly sunshine hours	165.8	164.3	194.6	218.7	238.3	231.3	217.0	206.1	166.5	165.7	156.5	165.7	2,290.5
Percentage possible sunshine	53	53	52	56	55	53	49	50	45	48	51	55	52
Source: China Meteorological Administration

== Economy ==
Hancheng has the biggest power plant in western China, generating over 2,400,000 kW.

== Culture ==
The famed Chinese historian Sima Qian was born in Hancheng in the Han dynasty and buried nearby.

== See also ==
- Dangjia village, Xizhuang
