= Jia County, Shaanxi =

Coordinates: 38°04′39″N 110°16′27″E

Jia County 佳县
- County
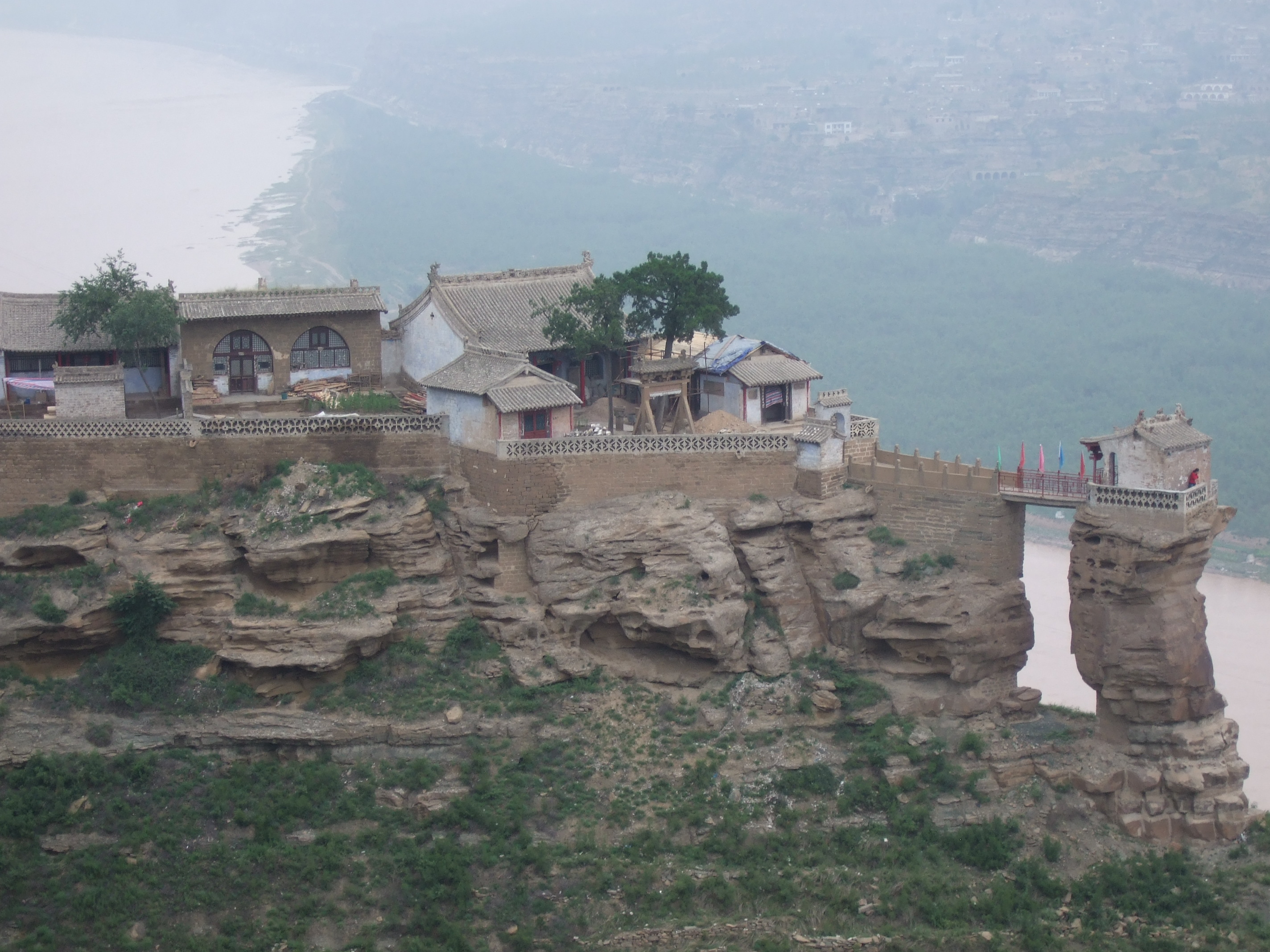

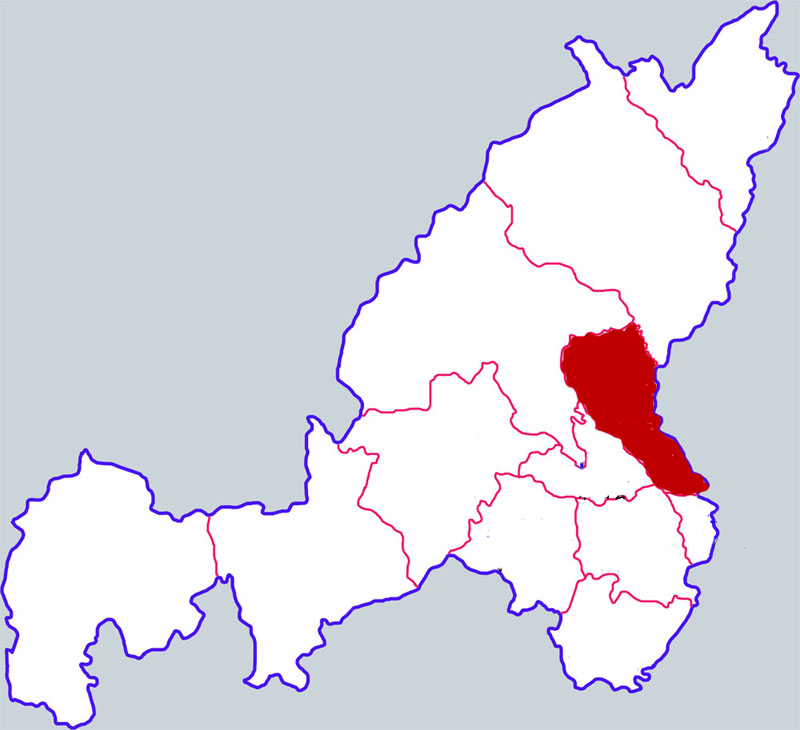
- Jia County in Yulin

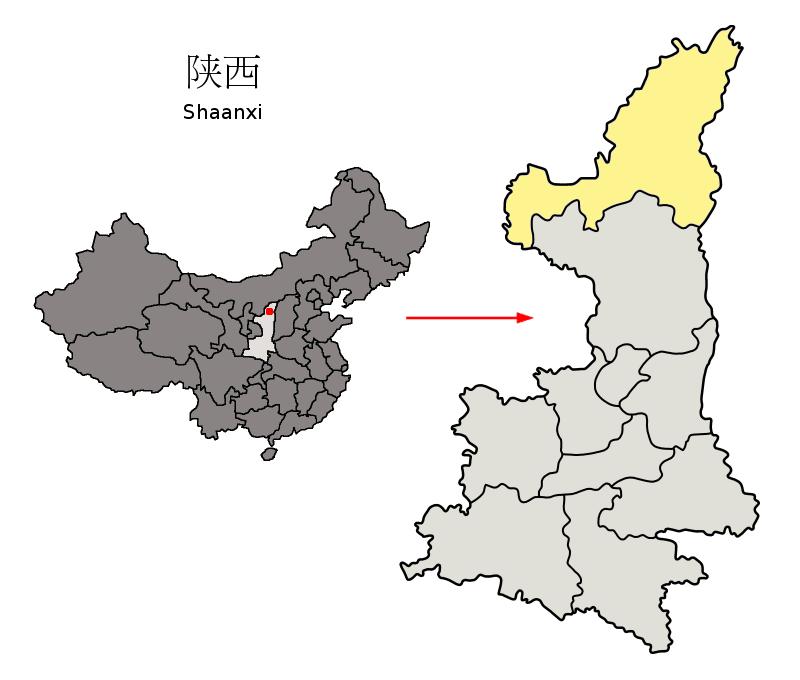
- Yulin in Shaanxi
- Country: People's Republic of China
- Province: Shaanxi
- Prefecture-level city: Yulin

Area
  - Total: 2,029.82 km^{2} (783.72 sq mi)

Population (2017)
  - Total: 269,700
  - Density: 132.9/km^{2} (344.1/sq mi)
- Time zone: UTC+8 (China standard time)
- Postal Code: 719200

Jia County
- Traditional Chinese: 佳縣
- Simplified Chinese: 佳县
- Literal meaning: Beautiful County
Transcriptions
Standard Mandarin
- Hanyu Pinyin: Jiāxiàn
- Wade–Giles: Chia Hsien

Former names

Jiazhou
- Chinese: 葭州
- Literal meaning: Reed Prefecture
Transcriptions
Standard Mandarin
- Hanyu Pinyin: Jiāzhōu
- Wade–Giles: Chia-chou

Jiaxian
- Traditional Chinese: 葭縣
- Simplified Chinese: 葭县
- Literal meaning: Reed County
Transcriptions
Standard Mandarin
- Hanyu Pinyin: Jiāxiàn
- Wade–Giles: Chia Hsien

Jia County, also known by its Chinese name Jiaxian, is a county in Yulin City, in the north of Shaanxi province, China, bordering Shanxi province across the Yellow River to the east.

== History ==
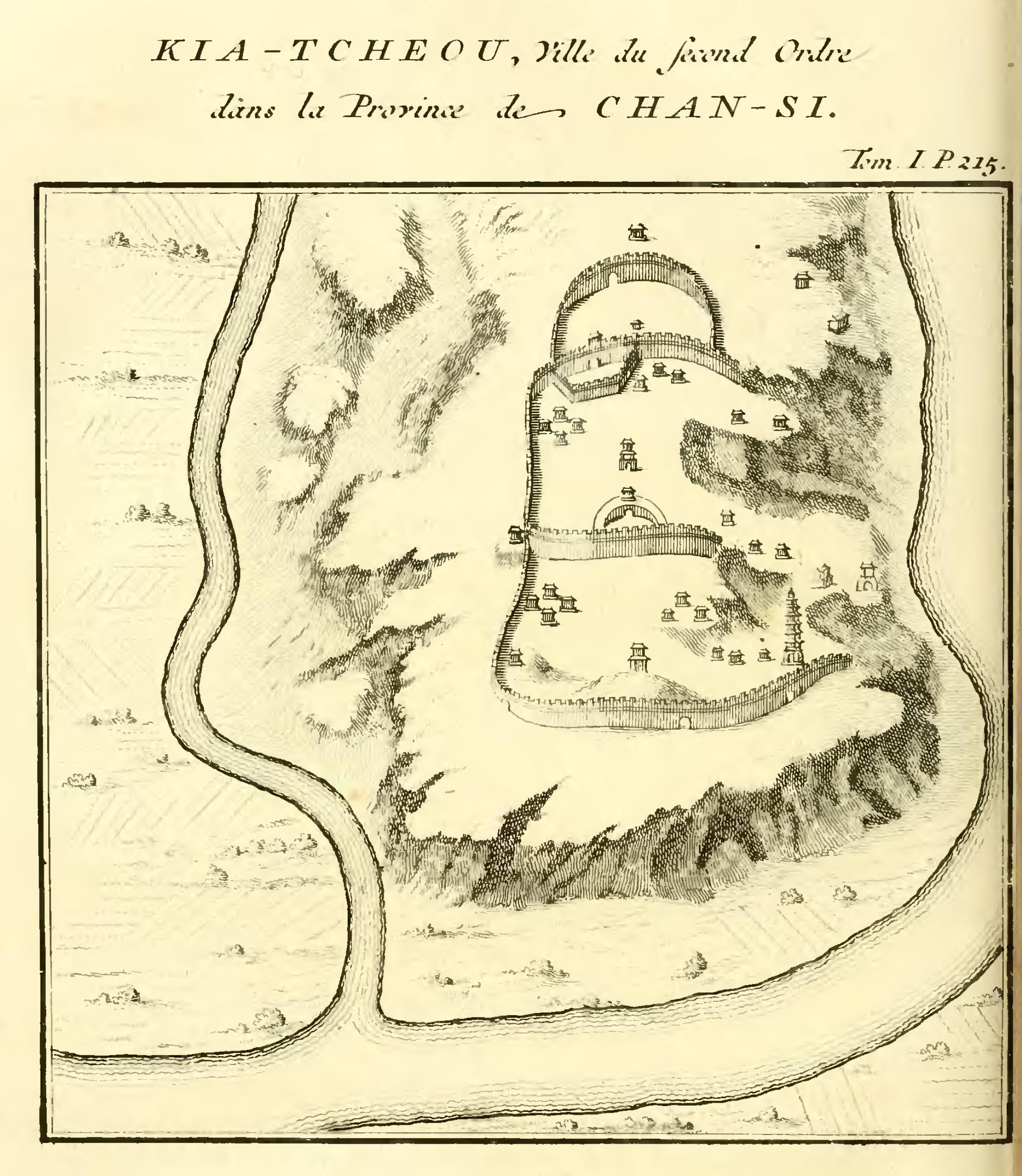
A map of "Kia-tcheou" from Du Halde's 1735 Description of China, based on accounts by Jesuit missionaries

The seat of Jia County was formerly known as Jiazhou when it was the seat of a prefecture during imperial times.

== Administrative divisions ==
As of 2019, Jia County is divided to 1 subdistricts and 12 towns.

Subdistricts

- Jiazhou Subdistrict (佳州街道)

Towns

- Keng (坑镇)
- Dian (店镇)
- Wu (乌镇)
- Jinmingsi (金明寺镇)
- Tong (通镇)
- Wangjiayun (王家砭镇)
- Tangta (方塌镇)
- Zhujiagua (朱家坬镇)
- Xi (螅镇)
- Zhuguanzhai (朱官寨镇)
- Liuguoju (刘国具镇)
- Mutouyu (木头峪镇)

== Climate ==
Climate data for Jiaxian, elevation 894 m (2,933 ft), (1991–2020 normals, extremes 1981–2010)
Month	Jan	Feb	Mar	Apr	May	Jun	Jul	Aug	Sep	Oct	Nov	Dec	Year
Record high °C (°F)	9.7 (49.5)	18.3 (64.9)	28.8 (83.8)	37.1 (98.8)	36.4 (97.5)	42.1 (107.8)	40.1 (104.2)	38.2 (100.8)	37.2 (99.0)	29.0 (84.2)	21.7 (71.1)	12.7 (54.9)	42.1 (107.8)
Mean daily maximum °C (°F)	−0.6 (30.9)	5.1 (41.2)	12.7 (54.9)	20.7 (69.3)	26.2 (79.2)	30.4 (86.7)	31.4 (88.5)	28.9 (84.0)	23.7 (74.7)	17.2 (63.0)	8.8 (47.8)	1.1 (34.0)	17.1 (62.9)
Daily mean °C (°F)	−7.1 (19.2)	−1.9 (28.6)	5.5 (41.9)	13.3 (55.9)	19.1 (66.4)	23.5 (74.3)	25.1 (77.2)	22.9 (73.2)	17.5 (63.5)	10.5 (50.9)	2.3 (36.1)	−5.2 (22.6)	10.5 (50.8)
Mean daily minimum °C (°F)	−12.2 (10.0)	−7.5 (18.5)	−0.6 (30.9)	6.5 (43.7)	12.2 (54.0)	17.1 (62.8)	19.7 (67.5)	18.1 (64.6)	12.6 (54.7)	5.3 (41.5)	−2.5 (27.5)	−9.8 (14.4)	4.9 (40.8)
Record low °C (°F)	−24.3 (−11.7)	−20.0 (−4.0)	−15.6 (3.9)	−4.6 (23.7)	1.2 (34.2)	7.9 (46.2)	13.8 (56.8)	9.0 (48.2)	0.5 (32.9)	−7.2 (19.0)	−17.5 (0.5)	−24.4 (−11.9)	−24.4 (−11.9)
Average precipitation mm (inches)	3.2 (0.13)	4.7 (0.19)	11.4 (0.45)	25.3 (1.00)	32.6 (1.28)	43.4 (1.71)	109.5 (4.31)	110.7 (4.36)	65.0 (2.56)	30.2 (1.19)	16.5 (0.65)	2.5 (0.10)	455 (17.93)
Average precipitation days (≥ 0.1 mm)	2.0	2.5	3.7	4.6	6.5	7.9	11.4	11.1	9.0	6.4	3.9	2.0	71
Average snowy days	3.4	3.2	2.1	0.6	0	0	0	0	0.1	0.2	1.8	2.7	14.1
Average relative humidity (%)	51	46	40	37	40	47	61	68	68	62	58	53	53
Mean monthly sunshine hours	188.7	185.1	226.7	245.6	272.5	261.7	248.8	227.4	202.1	208.9	189.2	190.4	2,647.1
Percentage possible sunshine	62	60	61	62	62	59	56	55	55	61	63	65	60
Source: China Meteorological Administration
