= Seven Sages of Meishan =

The Seven Sages of Meishan (also known as the Seven Sages of Mount Mei, Seven Saints of Meishan, or Seven Sages of Plum Mountain; simplified Chinese: 梅山七圣; traditional Chinese: 梅山七聖; pinyin: Méishān Qī Shèng) are a group of figures in Chinese folklore who appear in stories about Erlang Shen. In the Ming dynasty religious text The Precious Scroll of Erlang (二郎寶卷), they are seven followers of Erlang Shen. In Journey to the West, the group consists of Erlang Shen and his six sworn brothers.

The Seven Sages are different from the Seven Monsters of Meishan (梅山七怪) in Investiture of the Gods. In that novel, the seven monsters fight against Yang Jian, another name for Erlang Shen.

== Description and origin ==
The Seven Sages of Meishan appear in Chinese plays from the Yuan dynasty. Some early texts write Meishan as 眉山 rather than 梅山. The Ming dynasty religious text The Precious Scroll of Erlang (二郎寶卷) also tells of seven gods who became followers of Erlang Shen.

In Journey to the West, Erlang Shen has six sworn brothers from Meishan. They are four commandants named Kang, Zhang, Yao and Li, and two generals named Guo Shen and Zhijian. Together with Erlang Shen, they are called the Seven Sages of Meishan (梅山七聖). The six brothers help Erlang fight Sun Wukong. Later in the novel, they also help Wukong fight the Nine-Headed Demon.

A different group appears in Investiture of the Gods. They are the Seven Monsters of Meishan (梅山七怪), led by a white ape spirit named Yuan Hong. In this novel, Yang Jian is not one of the seven. He fights the monsters and helps defeat them. Yuan Hong can change his form, much like Sun Wukong in Journey to the West. Both stories also have a fight in which Yang Jian or Erlang Shen uses magic to face a powerful opponent who can change shape.

Literary scholar Chen Hong believes that the Seven Monsters in Investiture of the Gods were based on the earlier stories of Erlang Shen and his companions. He argues that the later novel changed Erlang's seven companions into seven monsters who fought against him. Chang Ming also notes the similarities between the two groups, but says there is not enough evidence to prove that the story was directly taken from Journey to the West.

The name Meishan is also used for the Meishan Sect, a folk religion from central Hunan. Its followers worship Zhang Wulang as a god of hunting. Chang Ming writes that there is not enough evidence to identify Erlang Shen's Seven Sages (眉山七聖) with the gods of the Meishan Sect. He suggests that the later use of the name Meishan (梅山) may have been influenced by the sect.

== Journey to the West ==
In Journey to the West, the six brothers are not described in much detail and appear only twice. In Chapter 6, the Jade Emperor seeks help in defeating Sun Wukong after the heavenly generals fail to subdue him. Guanyin tells the Jade Emperor that Erlang Shen, his imperial nephew, lives at Guanzhou near the Guan River. She also says that Erlang Shen had previously defeated six demons, was accompanied by the Brothers of Meishan, and commanded 1,200 Grass-Head Deities. She advises the Jade Emperor to summon him with a military decree.

"Your Majesty’s imperial nephew, the Illustrious Sage Erlang Zhenjun, currently resides in Guanzhou, at the mouth of the Guan River, where he receives incense offerings from the mortal realm. In former days, he once vanquished six demons. He is accompanied by the Brothers of Meishan and commands 1,200 Grass-Head Deities. His supernatural powers are immense. However, Erlang only obeys military orders and not civil summons. If Your Majesty issues a formal decree of military deployment, commanding his assistance, the demon can surely be subdued."

The Jade Emperor follows Guanyin's advice and summons Erlang Shen. Erlang Shen then goes to fight Sun Wukong with his six sworn brothers. They are Kang Anyu (康安裕), Zhang Boshi (张伯时), Li Huanzhang (李焕章), Yao Gonglin (姚公麟), Guo Shen (郭申), and Zhi Jian (直健).

In Chapter 63, the six brothers help Sun Wukong fight the Nine-Headed Prince Consort.

== Investiture of the Gods ==
In Investiture of the Gods, the "Meishan Seven Monsters" (梅山七怪) appear to have been based on the "Seven Sages of Meishan" from Journey to the West. The main difference is the role of Yang Jian. In Journey to the West, Yang Jian is one of the Seven Sages and the sworn brother of the other six.

In Investiture of the Gods, the Seven Monsters are instead seven demons from Mount Mei. Yang Jian is not one of them and is sent to fight them. He eventually defeats the Seven Monsters and becomes their master.

The Seven Monsters are called from Mount Mei to help defend Mengjin Pass for the Shang dynasty against the Zhou army. They use their supernatural powers to defeat several Zhou generals. As demons with many years of cultivation, they cannot easily be killed by ordinary weapons. Yang Jian uses his "Eye of Heaven" to see through their disguises and identify their animal forms. He then defeats each of them by taking advantage of the weaknesses of those forms.

=== Yuan Hong ===
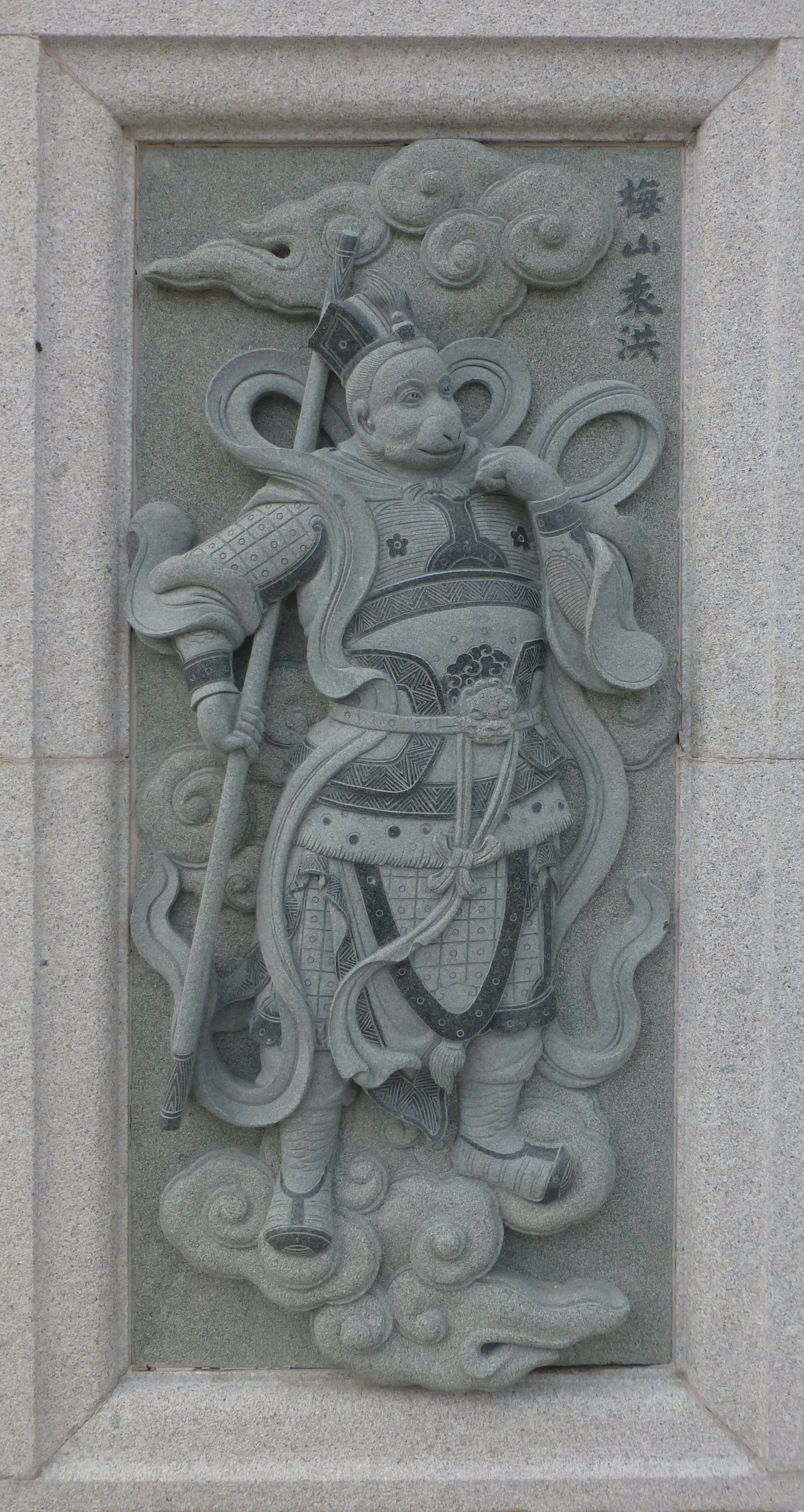
Relief of Yuan Hong

Yuan Hong is a white ape demon and the leader of the Seven Monsters. He is a powerful opponent of Yang Jian and has also learned the "Eight-Nine Arcane Art" (八九玄功), which allows him to perform transformations. Yuan Hong and Yang Jian fight by changing into different forms, but neither is able to defeat the other.

Yang Jian seeks help from the goddess Nüwa, who gives him the "Map of Mountains, Rivers, and States" (山河社稷圖). Yang Jian uses the map to trap Yuan Hong. However, Yuan Hong cannot be killed with ordinary weapons. Jiang Ziya therefore borrows the "Demon-Slaying Sword" (斬仙飛刀) from Lu Ya Zhenren and uses it to kill Yuan Hong. After the gods are given their titles, Yuan Hong becomes Sihu Xingjun (四废星君; Lord of the Four Wastes Star).

=== Jin Dasheng ===
Jin Dasheng is a buffalo demon who fights the Zhou general Zheng Lun. He uses two swords and can spit an "ox bezoar" (牛黃) from his stomach. The projectile kills Zheng Lun. The goddess Nüwa then uses the "Demon-Subduing Lasso" (伏妖索) to capture Jin Dasheng. He is taken to the Zhou camp, where Jiang Ziya orders his execution. After the gods are given their titles, Jin Dasheng becomes Tianwen Xingjun (天瘟星君; Lord of the Heavenly Plague Star).

=== Dai Li ===
Dai Li is a dog demon who first fights Nezha. He spits a red pearl from his mouth, forcing Nezha to retreat. Yang Jian then joins the fight and uses his Howling Celestial Dog against Dai Li. The celestial dog defeats Dai Li, allowing Yang Jian to kill him. After the gods are given their titles, Dai Li becomes Huangwu Xingjun (荒芜星君; Lord of the Desolate Star).

=== Zhu Zizhen ===
Zhu Zizhen is a pig demon with great physical strength. When he fights Yang Jian, he swallows him. Yang Jian then causes pain from inside the demon's body and seizes its heart and liver. Zhu Zizhen submits and goes with Yang Jian to the Zhou camp. Jiang Ziya orders his execution, and a soldier cuts off his head. Yang Jian then emerges from the body unharmed. After the gods are given their titles, Zhu Zizhen becomes Fuduan Xingjun (伏断星君; Lord of the Severing Star).

=== Yang Xian ===
Yang Xian is a goat demon who can emit a bright white light from his mouth. When he uses this attack against Yang Jian, Yang Jian transforms into a white-browed tiger. Yang Xian is frightened by the tiger and is killed by Yang Jian. After the gods are given their titles, Yang Xian becomes Fanyin Xingjun (反吟星君; Lord of the Reversing Chant Star).

=== Chang Hao ===
Chang Hao is a snake demon who can swallow enemies and release poisonous mist. Yang Jian transforms into a centipede and allows Chang Hao to swallow him. Yang Jian then destroys the demon from inside its body. After the gods are given their titles, Chang Hao becomes Daozhen Xingjun (刀砧星君; Lord of the Blade-Anvil Star).

=== Wu Long ===
Wu Long is a centipede demon. It uses black smoke to hide itself and attacks with its many legs. Yang Jian transforms into a five-colored rooster, which is able to find the centipede through the smoke. He then kills Wu Long. After the gods are given their titles, Wu Long becomes Poshui Xingjun (破碎星君; Lord of the Shattered Star).

== Other legends ==
=== Records of Li Bing and Son's Water Control ===
In Records of Li Bing and Son's Water Control (李公父子治水記), Erlang Shen is identified as Li Erlang, the son of Li Bing, a governor of Shu during the Qin dynasty. The story says Li Erlang enjoyed hunting. His father ordered him to kill a flood dragon, and seven friends helped him. The seven men became known as the Seven Sages of Meishan (梅山七聖). The account was written by the Qing dynasty scholar Liu Yuan (劉沅) and was later included in Guanzhi Wenzheng (灌志文徵).

=== Comprehensive Collection of Deities from the Three Religions ===
The Comprehensive Collection of Deities from the Three Religions gives a different story about the Seven Sages. It tells of Zhao Yu, who served as governor of Jiazhou during the Sui dynasty. A flood dragon was causing floods and killing people in the area. Zhao Yu entered the water with a sword and fought the dragon. Seven men went into the water to help him. Zhao Yu came out holding the dragon's head. The text identifies the seven men who helped him as the Seven Sages.

=== In zaju and folktales ===
Erlang Shen and the Seven Sages also appear in Chinese zaju plays from the Yuan and Ming periods. These include Erlang of Guankou Slays the Flood Dragon (灌口二郎斬健蛟), Erlang Shen Shoots the Demon-Locking Mirror While Drunk (二郎神醉射鎖魔鏡), and Erlang Shen Locks the Great Sage Equal to Heaven (二郎神鎖齊天大聖). In these plays, Erlang Shen is called Zhao Yu, the former governor of Jiazhou. The Seven Sages of Meishan (眉山七聖) appear as his followers and help him fight demons.

In Erlang Shen Shoots the Demon-Locking Mirror While Drunk, Zhao Yu says that he met seven men after killing the flood dragon. They bowed to him and became his followers. He calls them the Seven Sages of Meishan. The play also tells how Zhao Yu became a god and was worshipped at Guankou.

In Sichuan folklore, the Seven Sages are also called the Seven Friends of Meishan (梅山七友). They are said to have been hunters who helped Li Erlang kill the flood dragon. Another theory suggests that the seven friends may have been coal miners, as coal was mined in the mountains around Mount Yulei near Dujiangyan.

The Erwang Temple in Dujiangyan once had a Hall of the Seven Sages (七聖殿), with statues of the seven figures. The hall no longer exists. An old carving near the temple entrance shows Erlang and the Seven Sages helping Li Bing fight a water beast. The carving has been described as dating from the early Qing dynasty.

== In Song dynasty festivals ==
In Mengliang Lu (夢粱錄), Wu Zimu described a dragon boat event held on West Lake in Hangzhou during the Southern Song dynasty. The event took place on the eighth day of the second lunar month, during celebrations for the birthday of Cishan Zhenjun (祠山真君). Six dragon boats took part. They featured figures called the Seven Sages (七聖), Erlang Shen, the Ten Commandants (十太尉), and other gods and spirits. The boats also carried colorful flags, parasols, flower baskets, and drums.

== In popular culture ==
The Meishan Seven Monsters are the main antagonists in the 1973 Hong Kong film Na Cha and the Seven Devils, an adaptation of Investiture of the Gods.
