= Muong ethnic religion =

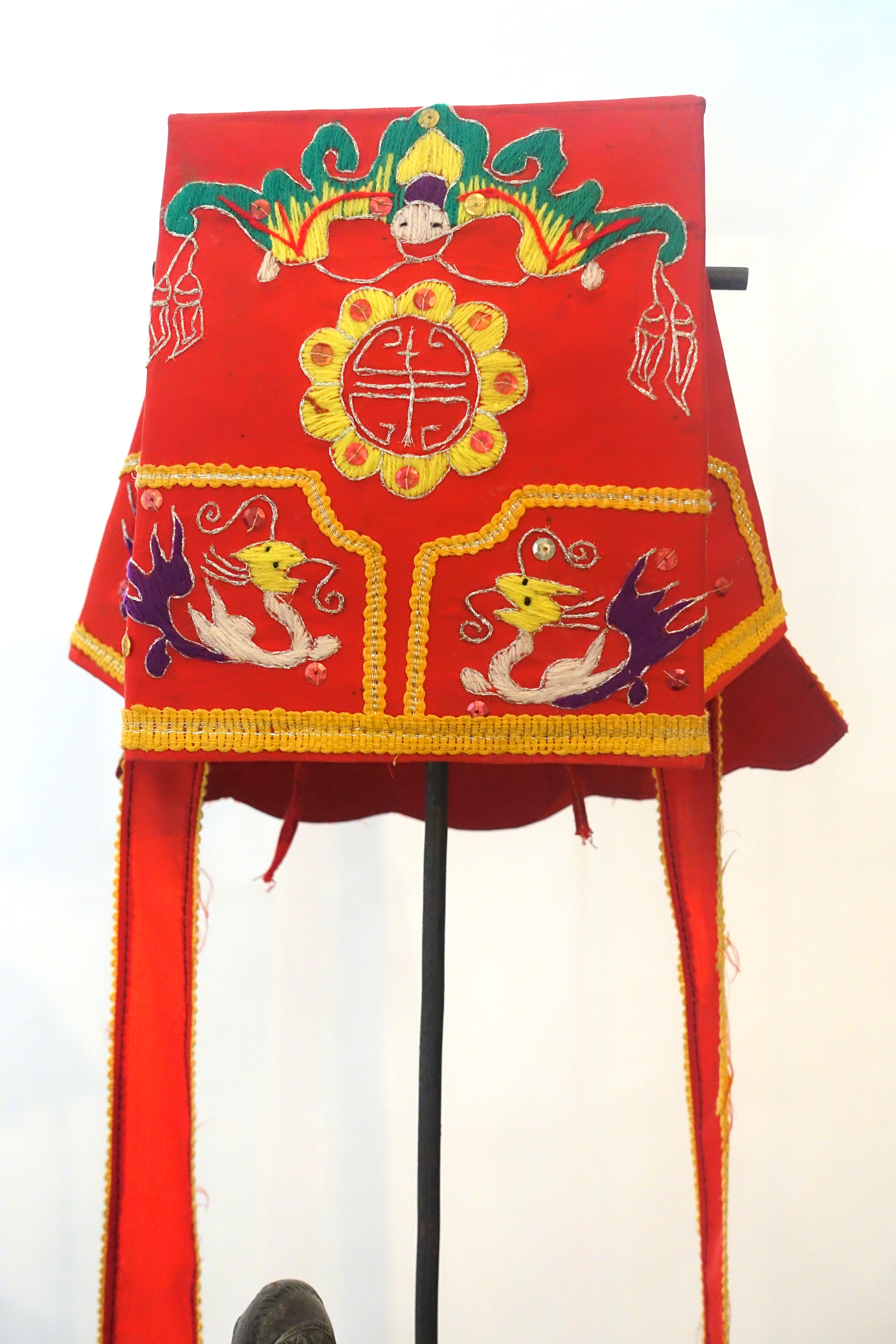
Mường shaman's hat

Muong ethnic religion is an ethnic religion, among the Muong, in Vietnam. It is polytheistic, sharing many supernatural beings with Vietnamese folk religion. This ethnic religion has the lunar new year as its main religious festival, including ancestor veneration.

According to this religion, every living person is thought to have many souls. It sees the passage from life to death in stages. It sees the soul as being divided in 90 parts.

== See also ==
- Tai folk religion
- Mo (religion)
- Vietnamese folk religion
- Yao folk religion
