= Miao folk religion =

Ethnic religion of Hmong peoples

Yeeb and yaj symbol used by a Hmong American folk religious institution.

Hmong folk spirituality or Miao folk spirituality (Hmong: Kev Dab Qhuas, lit. 'way of spirit worship') is the common ethnic religion of the Miao people. The religion is also called Hmongism by a Hmong American folk church established in 2012 to organize it among Hmong people in the United States. Hmongism combines animistic theology with reverence for unseen nature-based spirits and reflects the spiritual beliefs of the Miao peoples.

Although kev dab qhuas is remains practiced among Hmong, due to the influence of the cultures many Hmong in diaspora live in, much of the Hmong folk religion has incorporated other religious practices such as Christianity, Buddhism, Taoism, and broader Chinese folk religion, especially its emphasis on the pattern of the forces of the natural universe and the need of human life to be in accordance with these forces.

Many Hmong people in Asia have either converted to Buddhism or have a blended practice of Buddhism due to the openness and tolerance of Buddhism, and many Hmong Americans and Hmong Australians have either converted to Christianity or Buddhism.

== Theory ==
=== Deities, house spirits, and nature spirits ===
In Kev Dab Qhuas, there are many categories of spiritual entities, called dab (dah in high-tone usage), and are split into three categories: deities, house spirits, nature spirits.

==== Deities ====
Mother Butterfly (Hamap: Mais Bangx Mais Lief, also transcribed Mei Bang Mei Liu) is a deity in the oral epics of the Qiandong Miao people. Regarded as the ancestral mother of the Miao, she is said to have been born within a sacred maple tree. Emerging through a hole bored by the Woodpecker of the East, she combed her hair with her fingernail and washed her face with rainwater before marrying the foam of the river waves. From this union she laid twelve eggs inside the maple tree. These eggs were incubated not by Mother Butterfly herself but by the Jiyu bird, which hatched them after twelve years. From the eggs emerged the first human, Jang Vang, along with animals such as tigers and snakes and deities, including the Thunder God and a water dragon. The Hmong diaspora's folk religious do not appear to venerate her or regard her as their ancestor, though butterflies are invoked as benevolent spirits in traditional funeral rites.

Yawm Saub ('Yer Show') is believed, according to traditional Hmong beliefs, to have been the creator of the world who is said to endows all shamans with their abilities, and who have save humanity after the great flood. While Yawm Saub only appears in legends and is otherwise not worshipped, it has been said that Yawm Saub can be called in or interfere in times of need and can manifest in points of crisis throughout the course of history

Nplooj Lwg ('Blong Lue') who is, according to the Hmong legend, the frog who created heaven and earth. It was a place inhabited by humans and spirits where they lived together peacefully. Humans, however, claimed that the frog had lied about the size of the world, which was told that it was supposed to be no larger than the palm of a hand or the sole of a foot, and killed the frog. Its dying curse was that humans and spirits would no longer live together but that they would be separated into two worlds. Furthermore, the world of mortals would know sickness and death, alternate heat and rain, and that the leaves would fall off the trees. Before, humans had been able to rise up on the thirteenth day after death, but henceforth they lost that ability.

Yaj Yuam ('Ya Youa') is an ancestral hero, the "Heavenly Archer", corresponding to the Chinese Houyi. According to the Hmong legend, there were 12 suns and 12 moons and this caused chaos in the world. Yaj Yuam shot down 11 suns and 11 moons and when it came time to shoot down the last sun, the sun ran away in fear leaving the world in darkness. The animals came together and to decide which one will call the sun to come back. The cow, horse, and dog could not do it and when the rooster offer to do it, they laughed at them. The rooster then decide to call the Sun to come back and it only came back because the chicken was not intimidating but still have a powerful voice. This is how the Rooster came to call in the morning.

Ntxwg Nyug ('Zue Nyuu', also known as Ntxij Nyoog) and Nyuj Vaj Tuam Teem ('Nyu Va Tua Teng', corresponding to the Chinese Jade Lord) are two Lords of the Other World who control life and death. Ntxwg Nyug judges of the soul of the dead and determines in which form the soul will be reincarnated — vegetable, animal, or human, or if they can rest in heaven depending on what the person has done while living, while Nyuj Vaj Tuam Teem issues licenses for the rebirth of the soul of the dead. While Nyuj Vaj Tuam Teem doesn't play a big role in Hmong stories, Ntxwg Nyug plays a huge role in traditional Hmong tales as a villain plotting against Sib Yis, the first Hmong shaman; influenced by him spreading diseases and illnesses unto humanity, Ntxwg Nyug's name is translated as the 'Devil' by Hmong Christians.

Niam Nkauj Kab Yeeb ('Nia Gao Ka Ying') is the deity who watches over spiritual babies in the sky and if prayed to her, she can send children your way. She is believed to be a syncretism of a native Hmong deity of parenthood, Nkawm Niam Txiv Dab Pog, and the Chinese goddess of mercy, Guanyin.

==== House spirits ====
Dab neeb ('da neng') or qhua neeb ('khua neng') are 'tamed' spirits that float through the worlds and work with the shamans operating within a specific sphere which is their domain, usually the shaman's home. Some examples are: Dab Xwm Kab (spirit of good fortune),Dab Qhov Cub (the spirit of the main hearth), Dab Qhov Txos (the spirit of the ritual hearth), Dab Nthab (the spirit of the loft), Dab Roog (the god of the framework of the front door), and Dab Txhiaj Meej is the spirit of wealth and richness. Of all of the dab neeb, the Dab Xwm Kab ('Da Su Ka') is the most important of all 'tamed' spirits, as it is believed to protect the entire household from evil spirits and to watch over their wealth to ensure that their descendants live prosperous.

Nkawm Niam Txiv Dab Pog ('Ngur Nya See Da Paul'), or simply Dab Pog ('Da Paul'), are spirits who guides the spirits of mortal infants and are sent by Niam Nkauj Kab Yeeb to protect them until they reach adulthood.

Pog Koob Yawg Koob ('Paw Kong Yer Kong') are ancestral spirits who reside in the world of the dead form another category. They are involved in some shamanic practices and according to Hmong folklore, can come in times of dire by visiting in dream form or astral projection to provide guidance.

==== Nature spirits ====
Yawm Xob ('Yer Saul'), or simply Xob ('Saul'), is the god of thunder and lightning, said by the Miao to be born from one of the 12 eggs laid by the Mother Butterfly, and who is believed to strike down those who drink the mother's milk or unto those who had done wrong to others. In Mong folktale, he is said to have cause the great flood after Jang Vang beat him in a series of challenge; Jang Vang managed to escape the great flood due to his cleverness (he had tricked Xob into delaying the great flood for three days, enough time for Jang Vang to grow and hide in a giant calabash), but Xob ultimately succeeded in devastating everything else in return. In Hmong folktale, Xob once had a son, but his wife had no milk. He asked the Hmong for milk, but they gave him none; and so he curse them to be struck by lightning every time they drink milk from a mother not of their clan.

Nkauj Hnub ('Ngao Ńu') and Nraug Hlis ('Ńdao Hli') "Lady Sun" and "Lord Moon" whose love were spilt in order for the world to coexist together. When there is a solar eclipse, it is said that they get to meet each other, even briefly. During the first two times they try to meet each other, the Hmong people panicked and start making loud noise, believing that the moon is eating the sun and unaware of their love.

Poj Ntxoog ('Po Zhong') is a fearful spirit (often a feminine spirit) associated with the tiger. While Poj Ntxoog is feared amongst the Hmong people, some Hmong women seek her blessing to protect them from martial harm.

Zaj Laug ('Zha Lao') is the "Old Dragon" or "Dragon King" who is often part of Hmong legends as a character for the main hero to overcome his trials.

Dab Qus ('Da Goo') is a generic term that can refer to any wild spirit that is not part of house, and depending on the type of spirit are either benevolent or malicious. Care is taken to ensure that the Dab Qus' habit is not disturbed, least the offender gets sick and dies if not appeased.

==== Notable spiritual figures ====
The first shaman was Siv Yis ('She Yee'), who is said to be send down by Yawm Saub to heal humanity when Ntxwg Nyug was killing more humans than he was letting them live. Hmong shamans refer to themselves as "Siv Yis" when they are in spiritual ecstasy.

Txiv Yawg ('Tsi Yer', Chiyou) is worshipped as an ancestral king and god of the Hmong nation.

The Hmong house is a reflection of the cosmos. It is constructed around a central post (ncej tas {'ye tha'}) representing the world tree, axis of the spirits, which god is Dab Ncej Tas ('Da Ye Tha'). The roofs represent the heaven (the spiritual world) and the floor symbolizes nature (the world of men). The axis of the building represents the male head of the household and his ancestral spirit, the ancestral unity. People are believed to exist in the between of heaven and earth.

=== Yeeb Ceeb and Yaj Ceeb ===
"Yeeb" and Yaj" is the Hmong equivalent of the yin and yang found in Chinese traditional religion and Taoism. Differently from the context of Chinese thought, the Hmong "yeeb and yaj" is not represented by symbols such as the taijitu. The concept represents the world of the living and the world of the spirits: yeeb ceeb is the spiritual world, while yaj ceeb is the world of material nature. The Hmong also practice looj mem, like the Chinese feng shui which is used to determine place of best birthing place for boys and girls, as well as auspicious place and time to house the living and bury the dead.

== Structure and practices ==
=== Niam Neeb Txiv Neeb (shamans) ===
Shaman practice is called ua neeb (ua: "to do", neeb: "the spirit world", the dab neeb being specifically shamanic spirits), while the shaman is called Niam Neeb or Txiv Neeb, meaning "mother/father of the neeb".

The position of a shaman is not inherited as shamans are chosen by the neeb class of gods, manifesting through trails experienced by those chosen. Chosen people are guided by elder shamans until they are able to perform the healing rituals themselves. A shaman has control on their spirit's helpers.

In their spirit journey, the shaman calls on their helpers who are spirits to guide or assist them in the spirit world. They moves and sing on a spiritual horse (nees) represented in the living world by a shaman's bench (rooj neeb). They also call on the forces of the cosmos to help them, such as the creator of the world, Saub, the First Couple, Poj Ntxoog, Lady Sun and Lord Moon (Nkauj Hnub Nraug Hli), the seven stars of the Pleiades, and occasionally animal spirits. Divination horns (kuam neeb) is one form or means of communication whether the spirit has returned, and they are used in many rituals.

The shamans perform two sessions of healing rituals: the diagnostic rituals (ua neeb saib) and subsequently the healing rituals (ua neeb kho), only if the patient shows no signs of recovery after the first ritual.

The shaman's altar also has a special hanging or standing altar, with two or three tiers depending on the status of the shaman. The main focus of the tiers is to be a place for all the shaman's tools and items to be placed neatly, another can sometimes be a respect to their teacher, and another tier to practice spiritual healing (khawv koob). It is believed that these tiers represent Siv Yis' grotto near the top of the holy mountain, above a pool near of which grows the flower of immortality. This pool is represented by a bowl of water placed upon the altar. From the altar depart several cotton threads resulting attached to the central housepost, and it is along these threads that the neeb travel when they visit the altar.

=== House altar ===
Along with the shaman alter, the Hmong household altar is dedicated primarily to the Dab Xwm Kab (spirit of good fortune). It is placed on the wall of the main room of the house. On the altar people make offerings of rice, chicken, soup and rice served in bamboo, with incense and joss paper. Txi dab ('Ge Da') is the general term for the offerings to the spirits, while laig dab ('Lye Da') is the ritual of offerings to the ancestors. On the last day of the Old Year, rice is offered to the ancestors, with a sacrificed chicken, and a soul-calling ritual (hu plig) is held.

Joss papers are a central element of Hmong altars. There are both joss paper used as offerings and decorative joss papers; decorative joss papers are used as symbols connecting with the gods. They are usually composed of large white sheets of paper, with a small square of silver on one side and yellow on gold squares adorned with red squares, three on top and two on bottom.

Another type of Hmong altar is devoted to a special category of spirits known as the dab tshuaj ('da choua'), or spirits of medicine, which are generally practiced by Hmong women. In Hmong community, it is often Hmong women who specializes in the knowledge of herbalism. Although not as prominent, this herbalist spiritual system works in tandem along with the Shamanistic practices.

=== Rituals and psychology ===
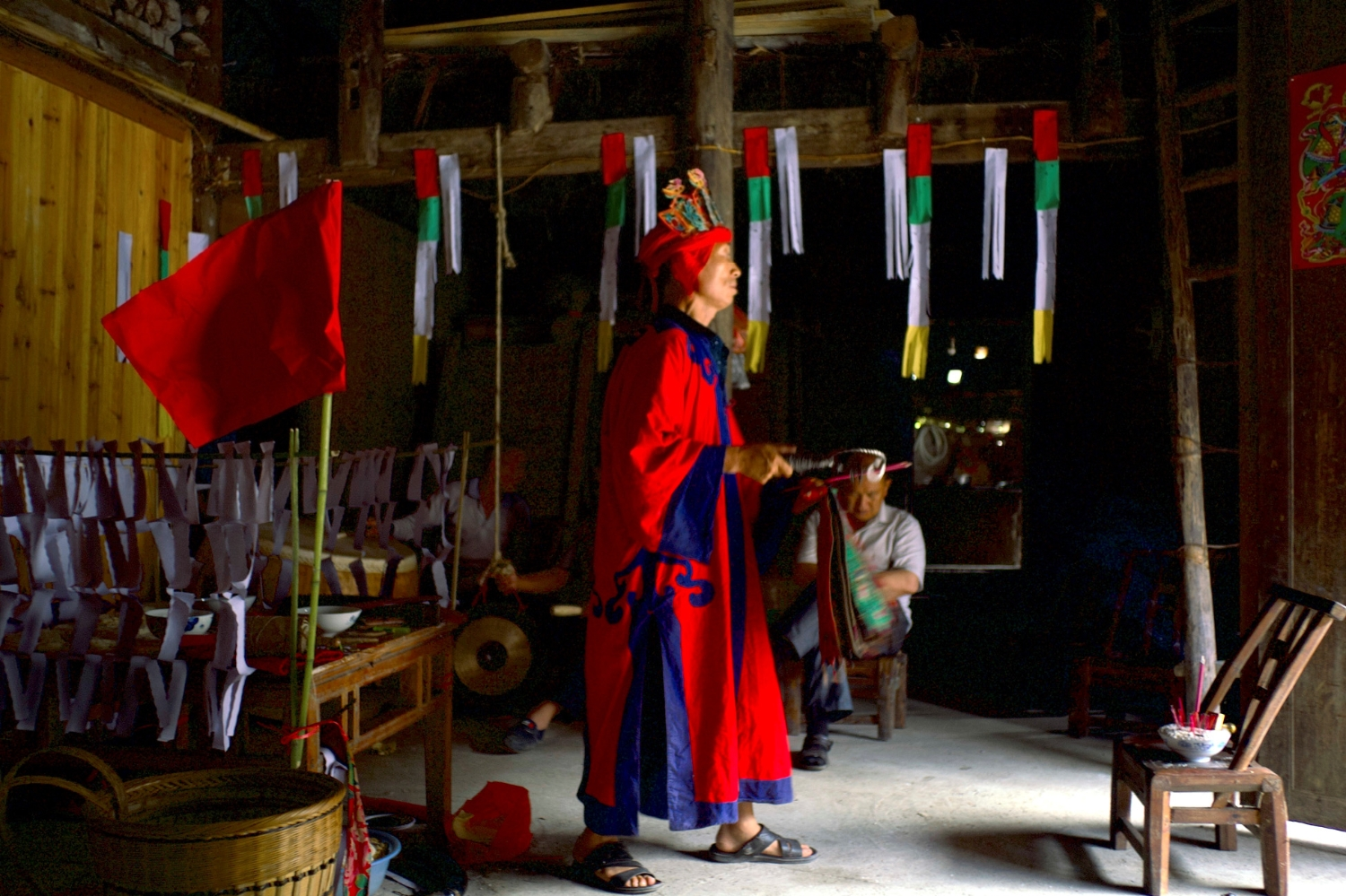
A badai performs a ritual ceremony, Xiangxi Tujia and Miao Autonomous Prefecture, Hunan, 2018

Religious rituals involving the respect of spirits and ancestors are performed by the patriarch of each family or the spiritual leader of a clan or a cluster of male relatives. More difficult ceremonies such as soul-calling (hu plig) are performed by ritual experts the shaman (niam neeb txiv neeb) for spiritual healing, and various experts in funeral rites like the reed pipe player (txiv qeej), the soul chanter (nkauj plig) and the blessing singers (txiv xaiv). The Miao tradition keepers and ritual experts, known as badai, engage in various practices, among them healing, exorcism, thanksgiving, and life-cycle rituals, who are male and passed down from father to son. The soul is believed to continue to exist in an afterlife in the ancestral spirit world or sometimes decide to reincarnate. The body (cev) is a microcosm believed to be constructed by a number of soul parts (plig or ntsuj) that mirror the macrocosm.

Hmong religion includes specific rituals for the milestones of the life cycle: there are rituals for birth and baby naming, marriage, rename after marriage, trauma and sickness, extending the mandate of life for sick elderly, death and funeral. There are also festivals with corresponding ceremonies: the New Year (Lwm Qaib or Ntoo Xeeb, or also Noj Peb Caug) in mid-November, Nyuj Dab (Ox Festival), Dab Roog (Door Festival) and Npua Tai (Pig Festival).

== See also ==
- Chinese folk religion
- Laotian folk religion
- Yao folk religion
- Buddhism in Southeast Asia
- Religious syncretism
