= Baci =

Lao-Tai folk religious ritual

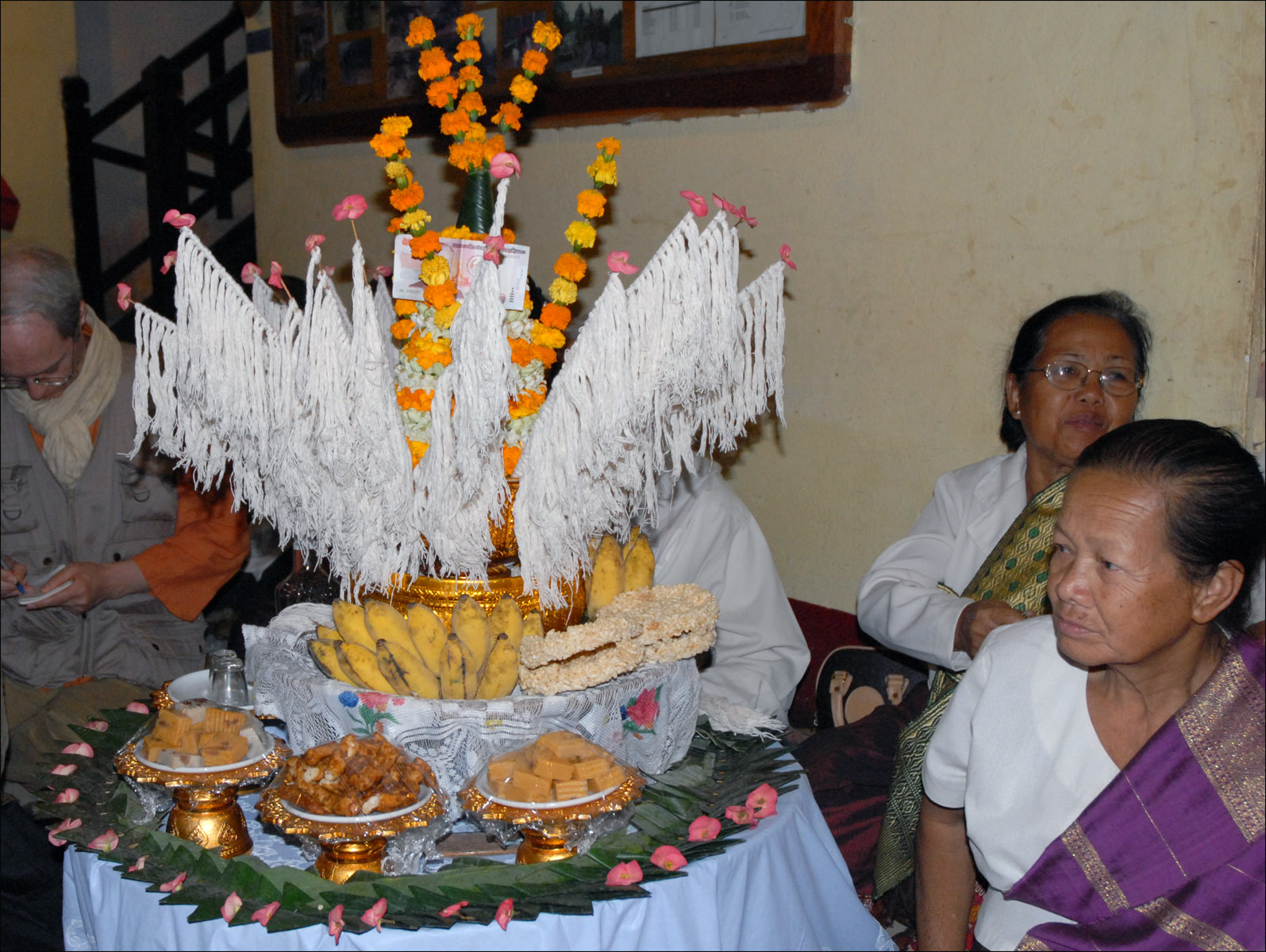
- The phu khwan is integral to Baci ceremony
- Also called: su khwan
- Observed by: Lao people, Isan people, Northern Thai people
- Type: Satsana Phi, religious rite
- Significance: Celebration of any auspicious event
- Celebrations: Decorating silver tray with flowers, banana leaves, bamboo poles with white cotton threads for worship
- Observances: National custom
- Date: Any day of the week, before noon
- Related to: Khwan Culture, Rik-khwan (Ahom religion)

Baci/Basi (Lao: ບາສີ; Thai: บายศรี, RTGS: bai si) and su kwan (Lao: ສູ່ຂວັນ; Thai: สู่ขวัญ, RTGS: su khwan; meaning "calling of the soul") is an important ceremony practised in Lao culture, Sipsong Panna, Northern Thailand and Northeastern Thailand (Isan).

Baci is a phi ritual used to celebrate important events and occasions, like births and marriages and also entering the monkhood, departing, returning, beginning a new year, and welcoming or bidding etc. The ritual involves tying strings around a person's wrist to preserve good luck, and has become a national custom.

== History ==
The observance of Baci as a spiritual ceremonial event was prevalent in Laos even before Buddhism made inroads into the country. It is also a common heritage in Southeast Asian countries, particularly in Laos. This practice is linked to the ancient belief that Baci is invoked religiously to synchronise the effects of 32 organs of the human body considered as kwan (QUANT) or spirits or the "components of the soul". Its observance to establish as social and family bond to maintain "balance and harmony to the individual and community, is done in its original format in Laos, as a substantiation of human existence".

== Ceremony ==
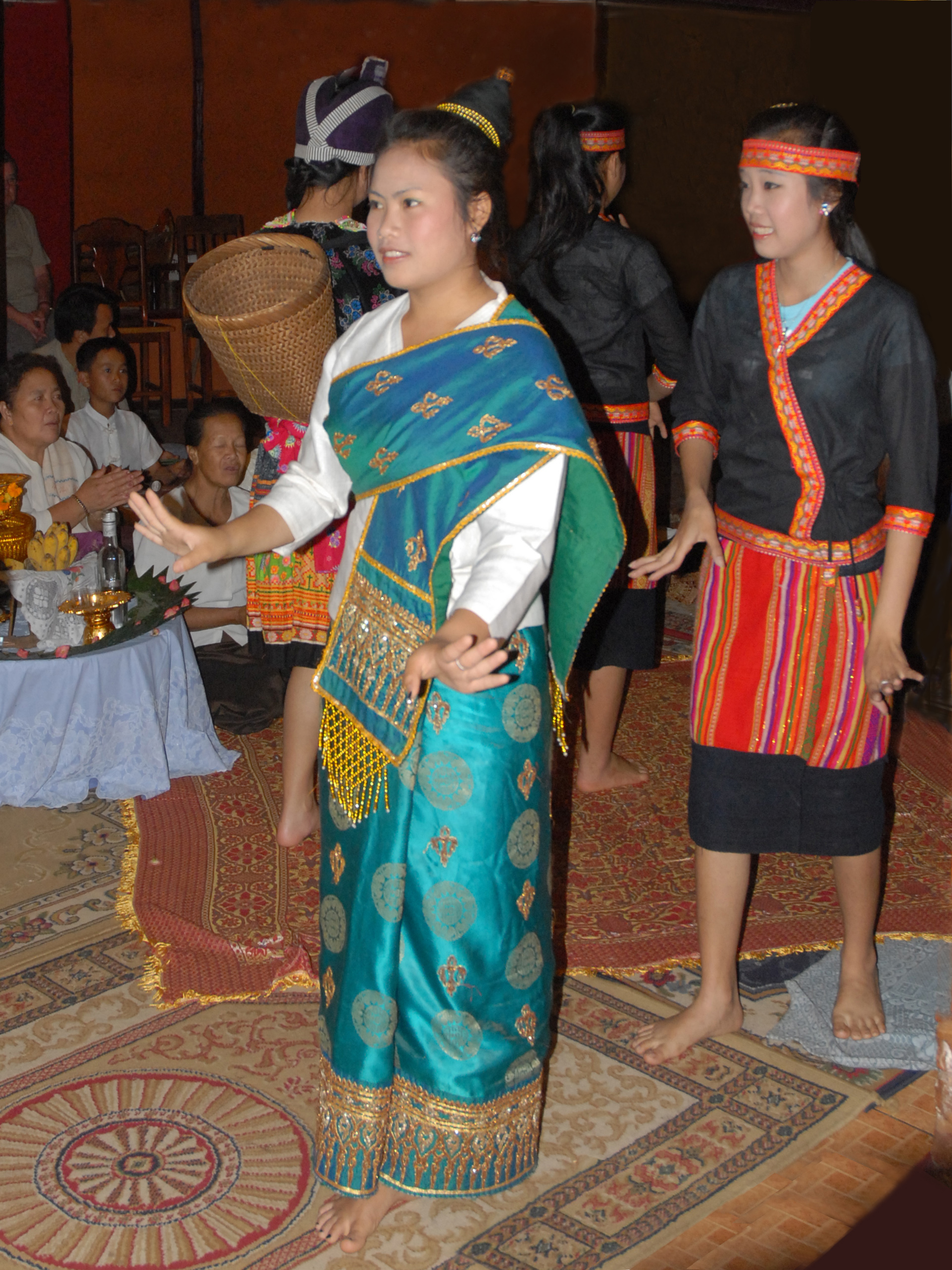
Baci ceremony in Luang Prabang, Laos

The ceremony of Baci is held on any day throughout the year as it is meant to commemorate specific events in an individual's life. It is usually held before noon.

The crux of the ceremony is to invoke the kwan, which in specific terms is explained as:

An ancient belief in Laos that the human being is a union of 32 organs and that the kwan watch over and protect each one of them. It is of the utmost consequence that as many kwan as possible are kept together in the body at any one time. Since all kwan is often the attributed cause of an illness, the baci ceremony calls the kwan or souls from wherever they may be roaming, back to the body, secures them in place, and thus re-establishes equilibrium.

The ceremony is performed by a senior person of the community who has been a Buddhist monk at some stage, and special arrangements are made for the occasion. The practice involves preparing the pah kwan or the flower trays and placing at a central location for people to gather around it in reverential prayers. The pa kwan is normally prepared by the elderly ladies of the household or the community. The paw kwan is elaborately prepared on a silver tray on which a cone or horn made of banana leaves is placed at the centre and is decked with flowers and white cotton and silk threads tied to a bamboo stalk as flags. The decoration with flowers is of different flower types with specific connotation of dok huck (symbol of love), dok sampi (longevity), dok daohuang (cheerfulness/brilliance) and so forth.

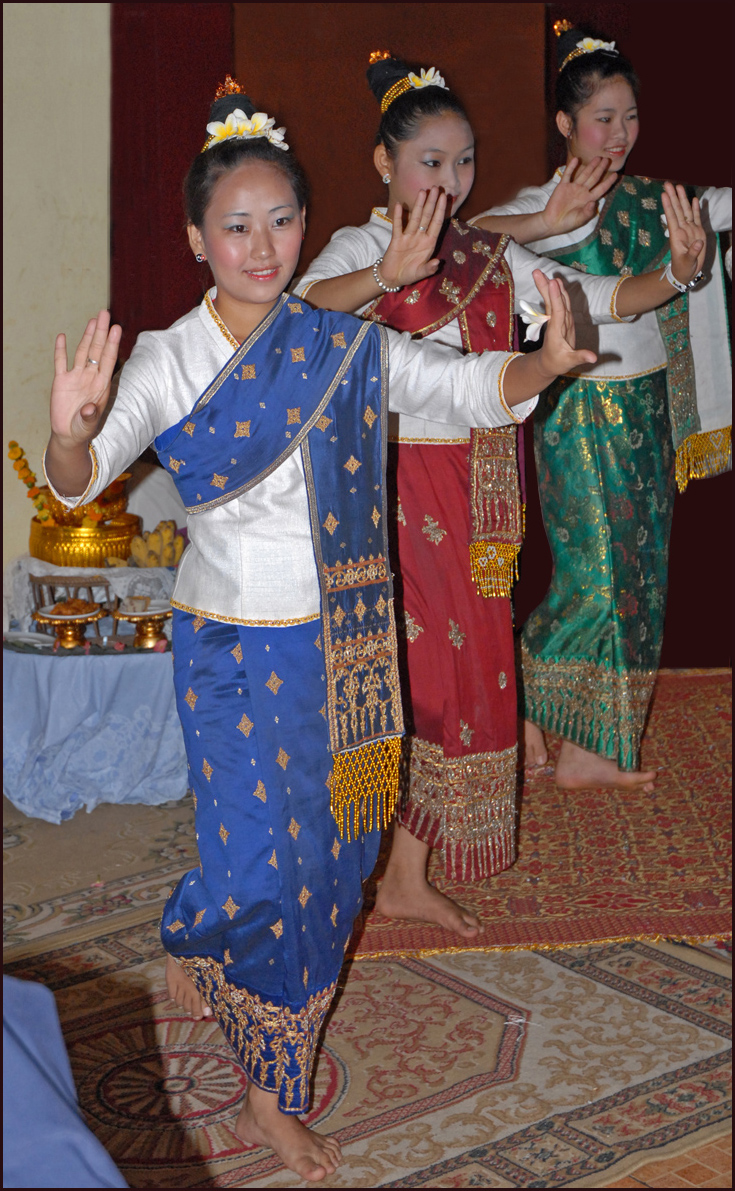
Traditional dance during Baci ceremony in Laos

The younger generation of people assembled for the occasion first pay obeisance to the elders present in the ceremony. Thereafter, every one in the assembly touches the trays of pah kwan reverentially as a mark of respect, amidst recitation of Buddhist chanting, in a mix of Laotian and Pali languages by the mor phon (the person conducting the ceremony, usually a senior person who has been a Buddhist monk). Buddhist devas, local deities and spirits are invoked amidst the chants for the return of kwans (souls) from wherever they are back to the body to ensure equilibrium. It is said to be a fusion of the traditions of Hindu and Buddhist religious practices.

At the conclusion of the ceremony, a feast of food is offered to all guests, with bowls of rice wine. This is followed by revelry of Laotian dance and music.

== Symbolic thread ==
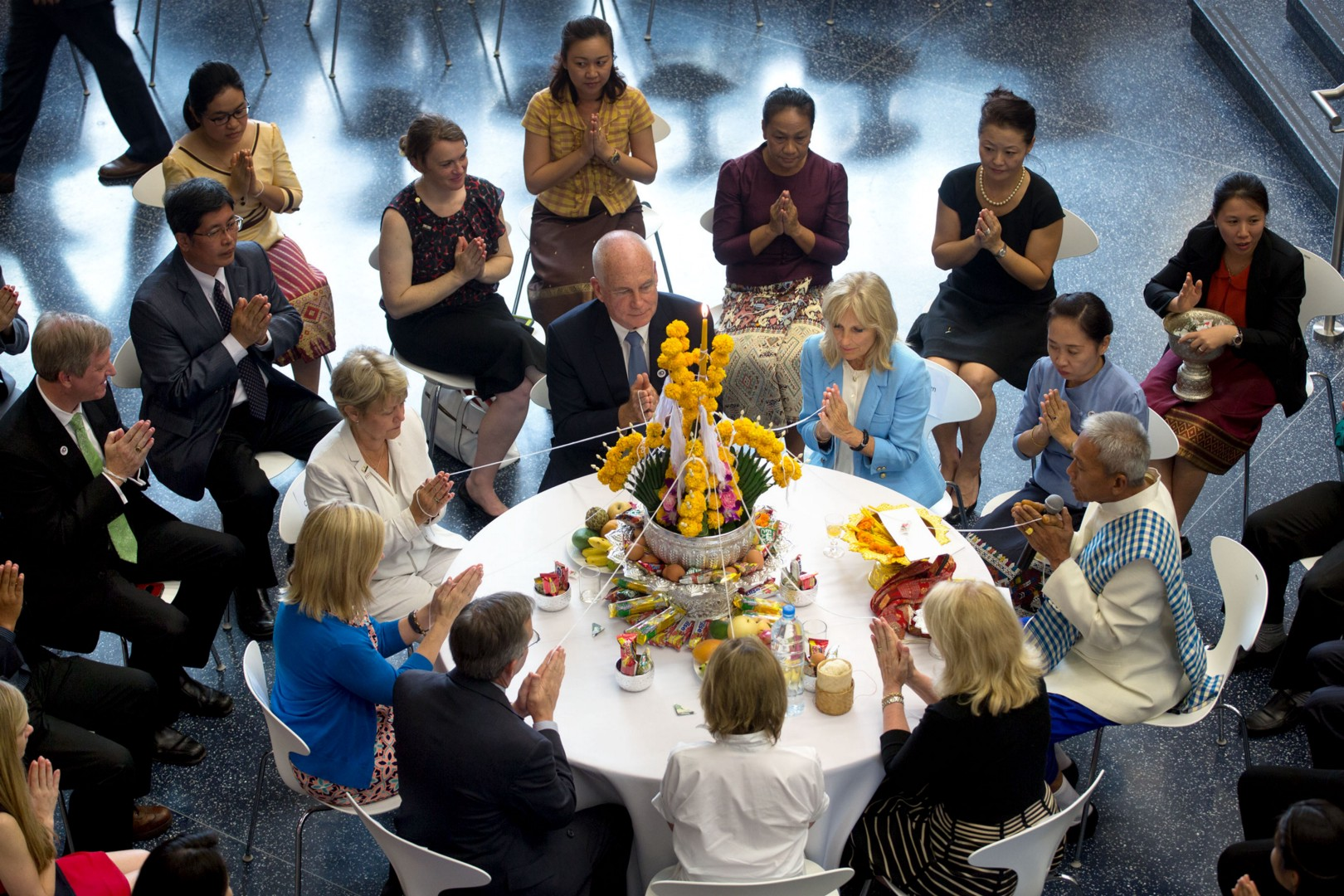
Jill Biden holding thread during a Baci ceremony in Laos (2015).

During the Baci ceremony, a white (symbolizes purity) thread of silk or cotton is tied on the right hand wrist of the individual who is being wished for his well-being and good luck and also around the wrists of all guests who assemble to wish a person. The thread is first knotted before tying on the wrist of the person to be blessed and other guests. Before the thread is tied, the hand is held chest high as a mark of respect. The white thread is symbolic of "peace, harmony, good fortune, good health and human warmth and community". The thread is worn by an individual normally for a minimum of three days and is released thereafter (thread is not to be cut). Recommended practice is to allow the thread to fall off on its own. In recent times, the thread in yellow, red and black colors are also used representing particular occasion; red symbolizing bravery, yellow representing faith and black sharing a person's loss or grief.

There is also a legend that links the cotton thread's significance to a successful and happy married life. In Laos, where a traditional way of life is of trust on beliefs and superstitions, a marriage ceremony has a special link to an ancient legend and to the thread tying ceremony of the Baci celebration. According to their legend, marriages are predetermined in heaven by what is termed as nene or "Love Karma" (destiny). In the heavenly garden, each individual has a tree with branches cuddling to the soul of his or her life partner. Eventually such pre-destined intertwined trees move to earth as human beings with their wrists tied together by a cotton thread. In the process of their coming to the earth, the cotton thread binding them is severed by "wind of scissors" and they are born on earth as separate individuals. Once born on the earth, they search for their soul mates and when they find them they marry, and by performing the Baci ceremony they are rejoined by tying the symbolic cotton thread. If the cotton thread so tied remains intact for three days then the marriage is considered fortunate and lucky for the couple.
