= Zhang Wulang =

Zhang Wulang (Chinese: 张五郎; pinyin: Zhāng Wǔláng), also known as Fantan Daodong Zhang Wulang (Chinese: 翻坛倒洞张五郎; pinyin: Fāntán Dǎodòng Zhāng Wǔláng) and the Inverted God (Chinese: 倒立神; pinyin: Dǎolì Shén), is a god in Chinese folk religion. He is worshipped as the god of hunting and the founding god of the Meishan sect (Chinese: 梅山教; pinyin: Meishan jiao). His worship began in central Hunan and later spread to other parts of southern China, including Yunnan, Guangxi, Chongqing, and Hubei.

== Iconography ==
Zhang Wulang is often shown upside down, with his hands on the ground and his feet in the air. Some statues show him holding a rooster in one hand and a knife in the other. Not all statues of Zhang Wulang show him upside down. The National Museum of Taiwan History has two wooden statues of him standing on his feet. The older one dates from the Qing dynasty. He wears a headscarf, a shirt and trousers, with one hand on his waist. The other statue shows him wearing boots and holding something in front of him. Some Meishan statues were also made from grapevine wood (葡萄藤).

== Origin ==
Zhang Wulang has several different origins in local stories. He is said to have been a hunter from Meishan, the son-in-law of Taishang Laojun, or a man born from a pumpkin. Some stories describe him as a successor of Panhu or Chiyou. Others name him Zhang Shikui (张世魁), a prefect of Qingzhou, or the leader of the Five Routes of changbing (五路猖兵).

Zhang Shihong believed that Zhang Wulang came from the Lushan (闾山) tradition. He described Zhang as a tiger hunter who learned magic from Jiulang (九郎). Stories about him were known in Fujian and Jiangxi before reaching Meishan in the late Tang dynasty. Hu Jianguo and Xie Xiangping, however, believed that Zhang Wulang was originally a local god from Meishan.

Zhang Wulang has also been linked to the Seven Sages of Meishan (梅山七圣), a group of figures who appear with Erlang Shen. The writer Yan Leisheng said that he had read an account from western Hunan which identified Zhang Wulang with Taiwei Zhang (张太尉), one of Erlang Shen's companions. In Journey to the West, Taiwei Zhang is named as one of four commanders, along with Kang, Yao, and Li. They are part of Erlang Shen's group of Meishan brothers.

== Legends ==
Zhang Wulang went to Taishang Laojun to learn magic. Laojun gave him hard work to do, such as cutting down trees, digging up roots, and collecting sesame seeds. His daughter Jiji (急急), also written Jiji (姬姬), helped Zhang with her magic. They fell in love and ran away together. Laojun sent flying knives after them, but Jiji saved Zhang. In one version, she later made him stand on his hands in the "pear tree" position so that her father could not find him. This explains his title Daoli Shen (倒立神, "Inverted God").

Other stories give different reasons for Zhang's upside-down position. One says that he could cut off his own head and put it back on. After doing a somersault, a woman asked him for water, and he put his head back the wrong way. Another says that he hung upside down to hide from a large snake sent by Laojun. Jiji is also said to have used a spell to keep him standing on his hands after he boasted about his powers. In a hunting story, a tiger pushed Zhang off a cliff, leaving his body hanging upside down from a tree.

Among the Yao people, Meishan is regarded as the home of their ancestors. They believe that after death, a person's soul returns to the "Caves of Meishan" (梅山洞) to join the ancestors. Zhang Wulang is also worshipped in Yao Meishan religious traditions.

== Rituals ==
Zhang Wulang is worshipped by hunters and Meishan religious masters. Hunters offer incense, wine, and meat to him before going into the mountains. He is also called upon to protect families, drive away evil spirits, and help the sick. In Meishan religion, he is known as Fantan Daodong Zhang Wulang (翻坛倒洞张五郎) and is believed to command spirit soldiers called changbing (猖兵).

Meishan ritual books contain prayers and spells for Zhang Wulang, including the Zhang Wulang Spell (张五郎咒). These spells are used to call upon him during ceremonies. Other Meishan rituals include calling back lost souls, stopping bleeding, and treating snakebites.

== Interpretations ==
Dieter Jüdt and Gong Longyu describe Zhang Wulang as a trickster and a "boundary-crosser". They see his upside-down position as a symbol of a world where normal rules are turned around. In their view, Zhang breaks the old rules by going against Taishang Laojun and running away with his daughter. They compare his story to a struggle between the old order and change.

== Modern cultural landmarks ==
A 16.8-metre-tall stone statue of Zhang Wulang stands in the Chinese Meishan Culture Park (中国梅山文化园) in Xianxi Town, Anhua County, Hunan. It shows him standing on his hands, with his feet in the air.
