= Phra Mae Ya =

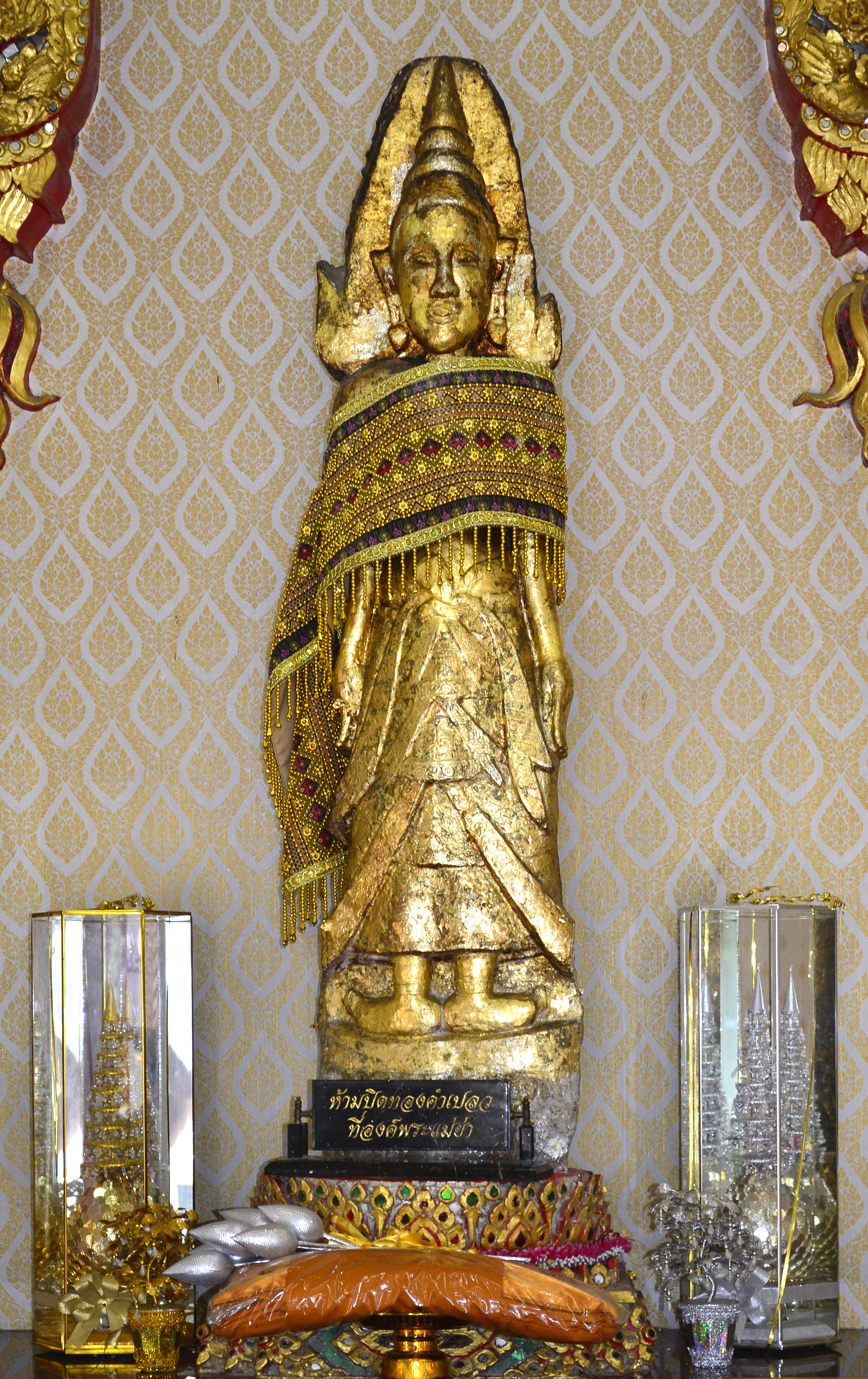
The original idol of Phra Mae Ya at her shrine in Sukhothai Thani

Phra Mae Ya (Thai: พระแม่ย่า) or Mae Ya (Thai: แม่ย่า) is a female deity worshipped in Tai folk religion associated with, and as the tutelary of Sukhothai province in Thailand. She is based on her idol, a rock sculpture measuring 52 inches (130 cm) in height. The locals venerate her as the spirit of Nang Sueang, mother of King Ramkhamhaeng of Sukhothai Kingdom. Her name, Mae Ya (mother-grandmother) is based on this belief, as Sukhothai kings were referred to as Pho Mueang (พ่อเมือง; father [of the] city). It was also hypothesised that she could be the great spirit of Phra Khaphung Phi (พระขพุงผี) that was mentioned in the Ramkhamhaeng inscription as the "spirit (phi) greater than all" that was worshipped by King Ramkhamhaeng. Others suggested the idol could have previously depicted Hindu god Narayana or the Hindu goddess Parvati.

== Idol ==
The idol is a stone sculpture made of slate, standing at 52 inches (130 cm) in height including the base. The idol depicts a tall and thin female with a long face similar to those of Sukhothai-era Buddha statues. Her hairs is styled as a four-tiered bun topped with a tall Chada (headdress). She wears a breast chain without underlying top, leaving out both breasts. Bottom wear includes a hanging central piece (Chai Wai; ชายไหว) with both hanging side pieces (Chai Khraeng; ชายแครง). Jewelries of long-hanging earrings, arm and wrist bracelets, anklets decorate the body. She wears curly-tipped shoes Author Kanokwan Sophonwatthanawichit wrote in her book, A History of Sukhothai, that the idol could had depicted the Hindu god Narayana. However, Potcharaphong Phutson wrote in a periodic for Lek-Prapai Viriyaphan Foundation, arguing that "the idol is obviously feminine in appearance, so much so that it could have not been depicting Narayana."

The original idol is now enshrined at her own shrine, San Phra Mae Ya (Phra Mae Ya's shrine) in Sukhothai Thani, Mueang Sukhothai district, across the road from the Provincial Hall. Replicas of the idols can be found in different locations, including at Wat Tham Phra Mae Ya (where the statue was first discovered) in Khiri Mat district, Phra Mae Ya Botanic Garden on the shore of Thung Thale Luang, in Suan Sukkhaphap Park in Khiri Mat district, and in the Ramkhamhaeng National Park; all in Sukhothai province.

== History ==
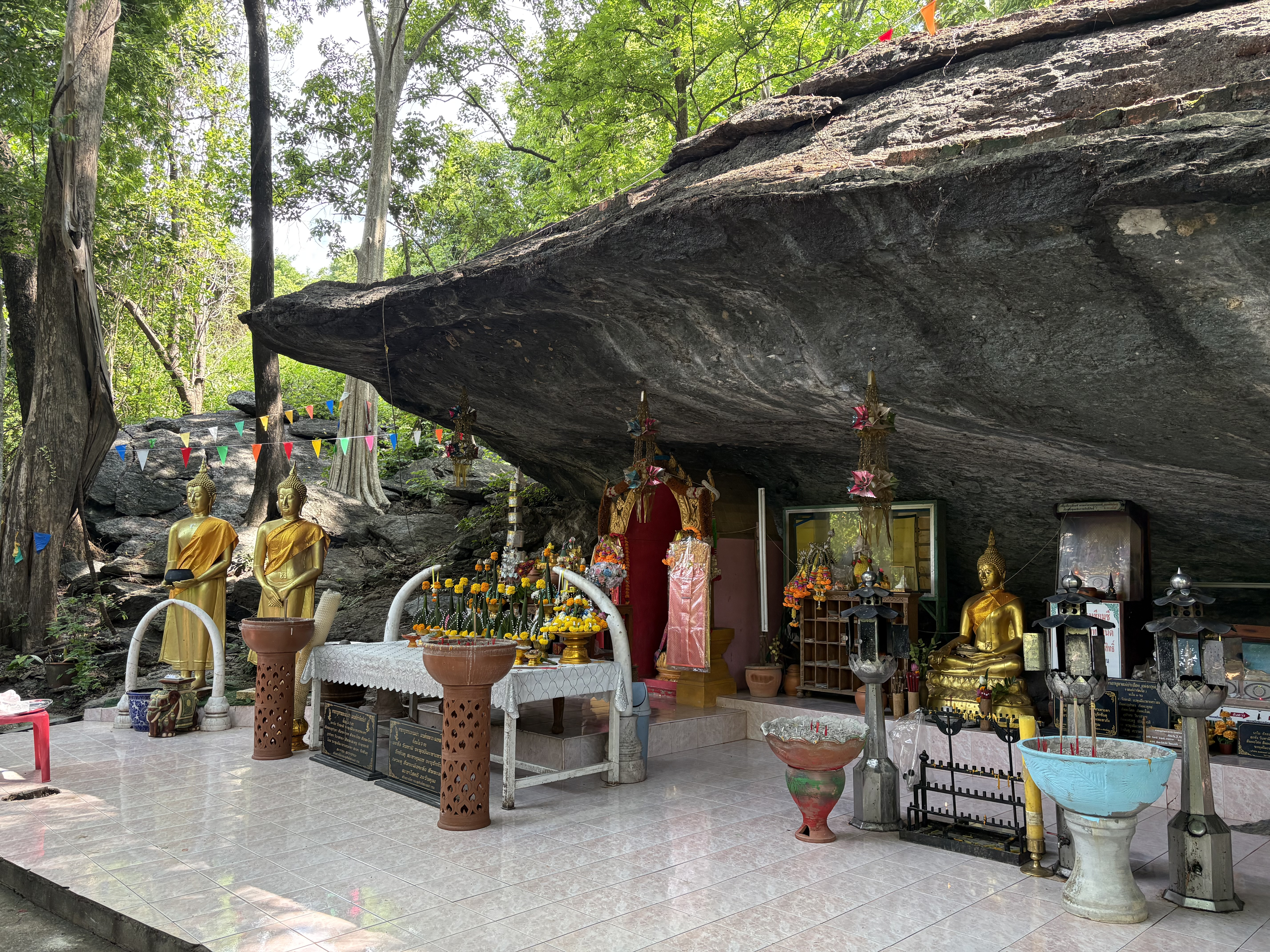
Phra Mae Ya cave, located in Khiri Mat district, pictured here in 2026

The idol of Phra Mae Ya was discovered in a shelter on a hill. The site was later named Tham Phra Mae Ya (Phra Mae Ya cave; despite the fact that it is an open hillside shelter rather than a cave) located in Ban Wong Bo, Na Choeng Khiri subdistrict, Khiri Mat district, Sukhothai province. Local villagers first discovered the idol and worshipped it. In 1915, the idol was first documented by Prince Damrong Rajanubhab who came to learn about the statue's existence while researching the history of Sukhothai. Damrong Rajanubhab later hypothesised that the idol is the Phra Khaphung Phi, "the greatest Phi (deity/spirit) of all", mentioned worshipped by the King Ramkhamhaeng in the Ramkhamhaeng inscription. One source, however, attributed the discovery to Prince Chakrabongse Bhuvanath in February 1912.

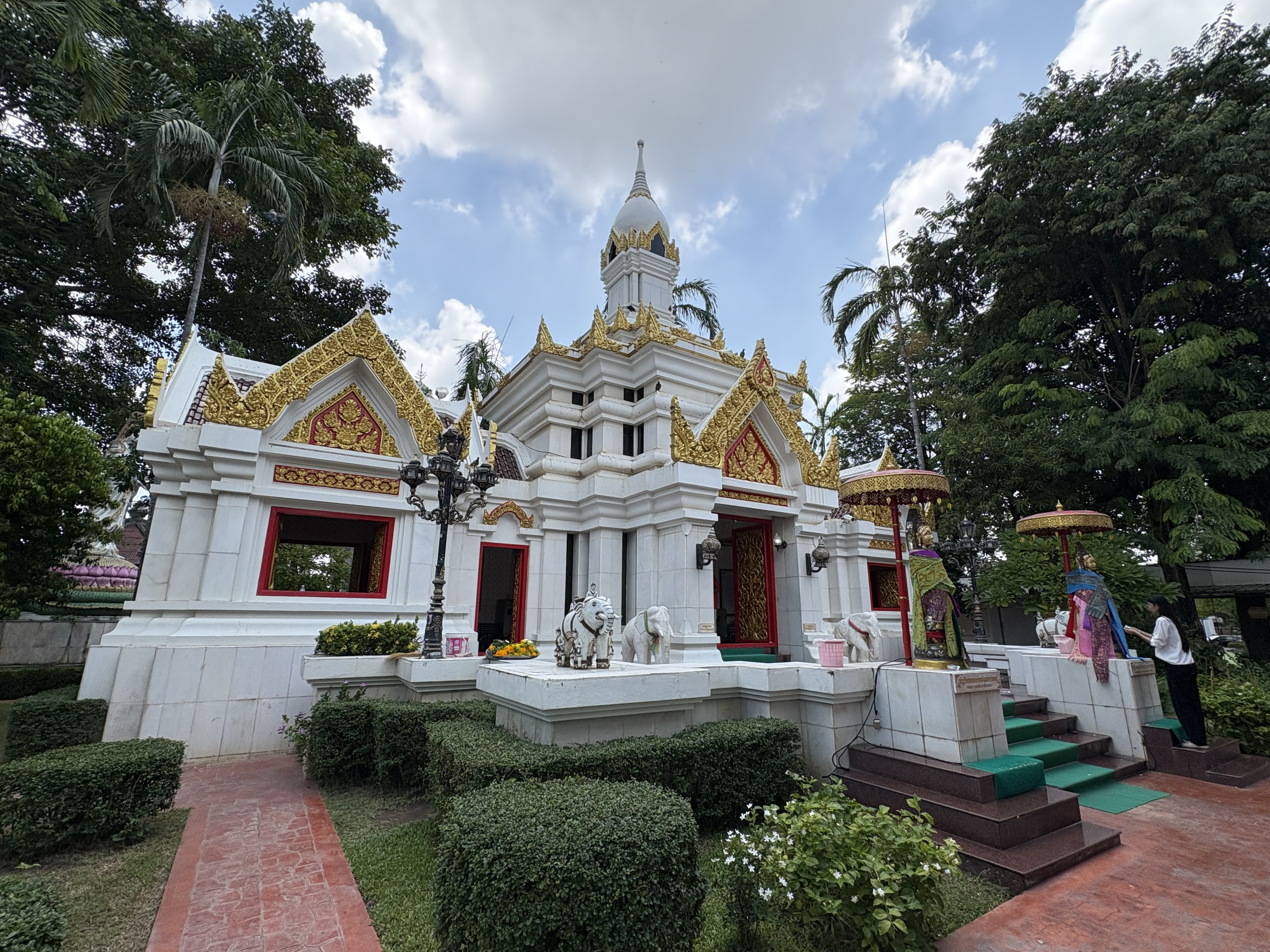
Phra Mae Ya Shrine in 2026

The idol was enshrined in situ at the hillside in Na Choeng Khiri (today located in Wat Tham Phra Mae Ya temple) until 1917, when the mayor of Sukhothai, Phraya Ram Ratcha Phakdi (Yai Sonlam) relocated the idol to the Sukhothai Provincial Hall's museum. It was then moved temporarily to the provincial hall of Sawankhalok province in Sawankhalok and remained there from 1913 to 1939, during the period which Sukhothai province was renamed Sawankhalok (and the administrative centre subsequently moved from Sukhothai to Sawankhalok). The idol was relocated thereafter back to the Sukhothai Provincial Hall's conventional hall in Mueang Sukhothai district The idol was eventually moved to the present-day location of her shrine in 1953, when the newly dedicated building was constructed across the road from the Provincial Hall. The current structure of the shrine was rebuilt in 1994-1998 with the idol officially re-enshrined in the new building on January 6 1998.

== Annual Fair ==
The legends of Phra Mae Ya were associated with rain. During Thai New Year's major date of Maha Songkran, "big rain falls every time the idol is out for a public procession". Phra Mae Ya Annual Fair (or Phra Mae Ya Worshipping Fair) is hosted in February or March annually for 10 days and 10 nights. Mae Ya mango plum is a fruit with a designated geographical indication for Sukhothai province. The fruit is named so after the fact that the first tree was planted from seeds bought from the Phra Mae Ya annual fair.
