= Yuan Hong =

Yuan Hong is the name of:

- Yuan Hong (historian) (328–376), Jin dynasty official and historian
- Emperor Xiaowen of Northern Wei (467–499), Northern Wei emperor known as Yuan Hong after 496
- Yuan Hong (actor) (born 1982), Chinese actor
