= Yang Jian =

Yang Jian or Jian Yang may refer to:

== Historical figures ==
- Emperor Wen of Sui (541–604), personal name Yang Jian, founder and emperor of the Sui dynasty
- Yang Jian (Sui prince) (585–618), Sui dynasty prince and Emperor Wen's grandson
- Yang Jian (Song dynasty) (died 1121), Song dynasty eunuch politician

== Sportspeople ==
- Yang Jian (rower) (born 1981), Chinese rower
- Yang Jian (footballer) (born 1988), Chinese footballer
- Yang Jian (diver) (born 1994), Chinese diver

== Others ==
- Erlang Shen, personal name Yang Jian, a mythological Chinese God
  - New Gods: Yang Jian, 2022 animation film based on the character of Erlang Shen
- Jian Yang (politician) (born c. 1961), China-born New Zealand politician
- Jian Yang (geneticist), statistical geneticist, Ruth Stephens Gani Medalist

== See also ==
- Yangjian, a town in Wuxi, Jiangsu, China
- Yang Jiang (1911–2016), Chinese dramatist, writer, and translator
