= Tai folk religion =

Native ethnic religion of the Tai people

Tai Folk Religion
- ສາສະໜາຜີ ศาสนาผี 𑜈𑜃𑜫 𑜇𑜣
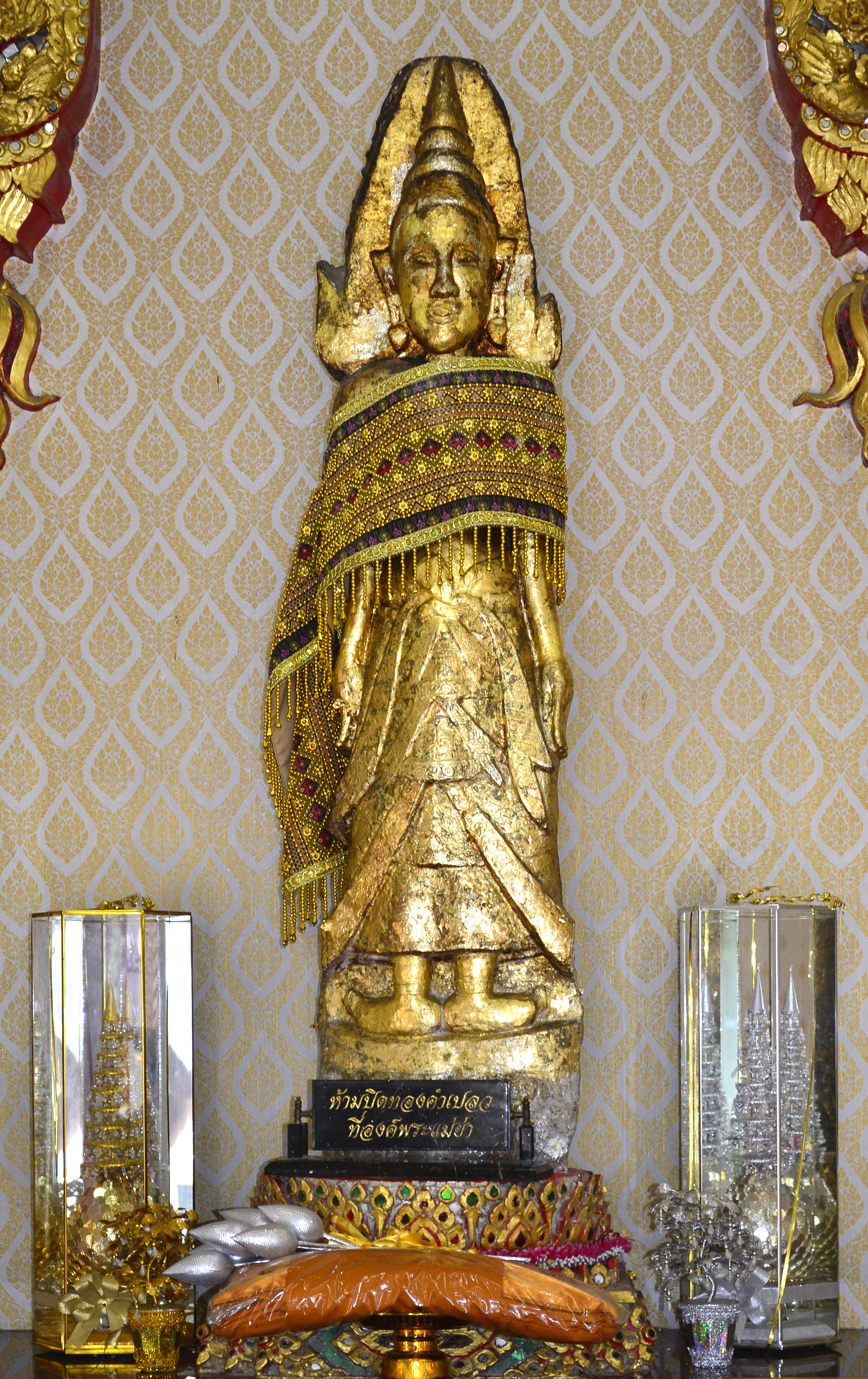
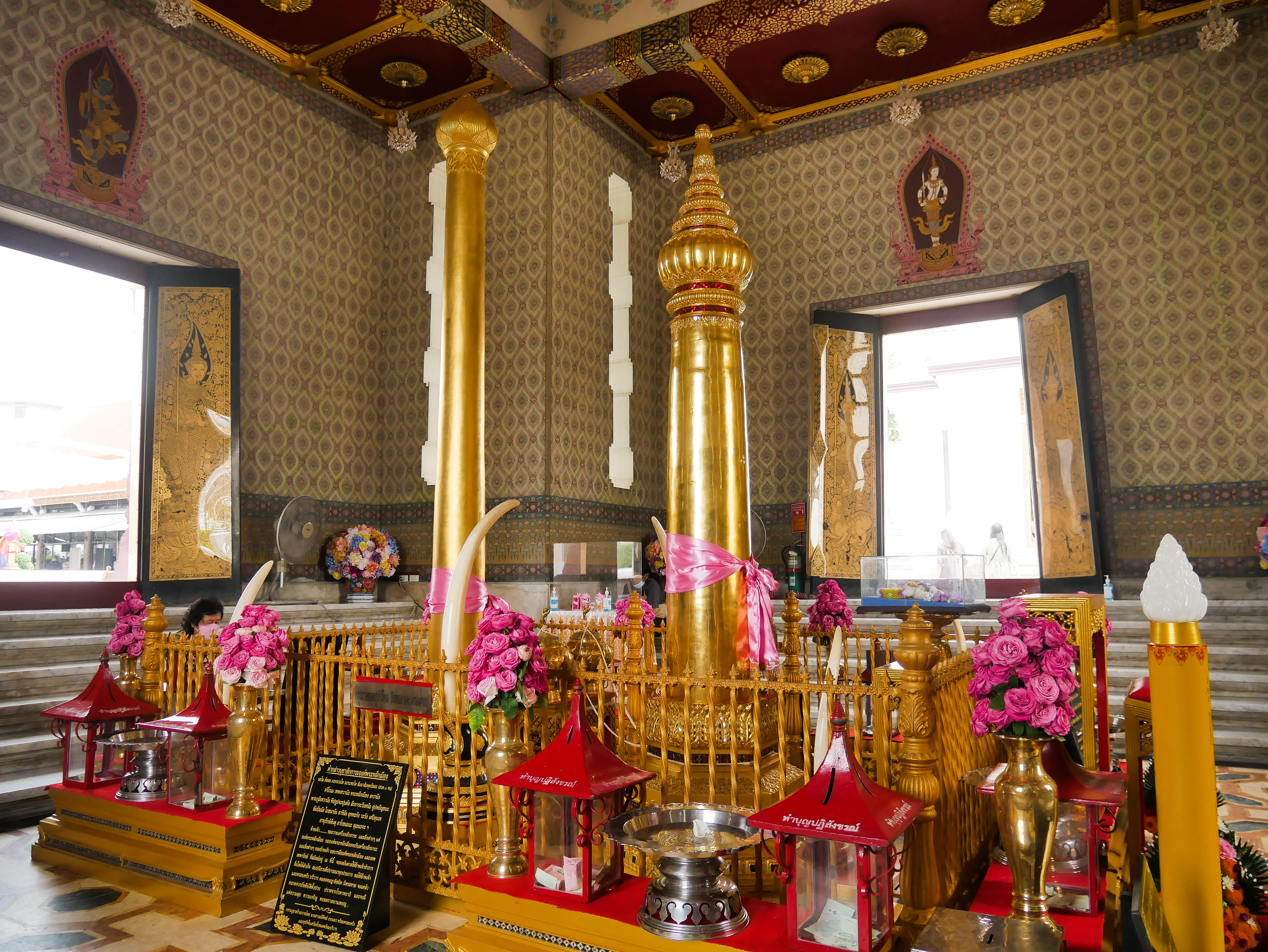
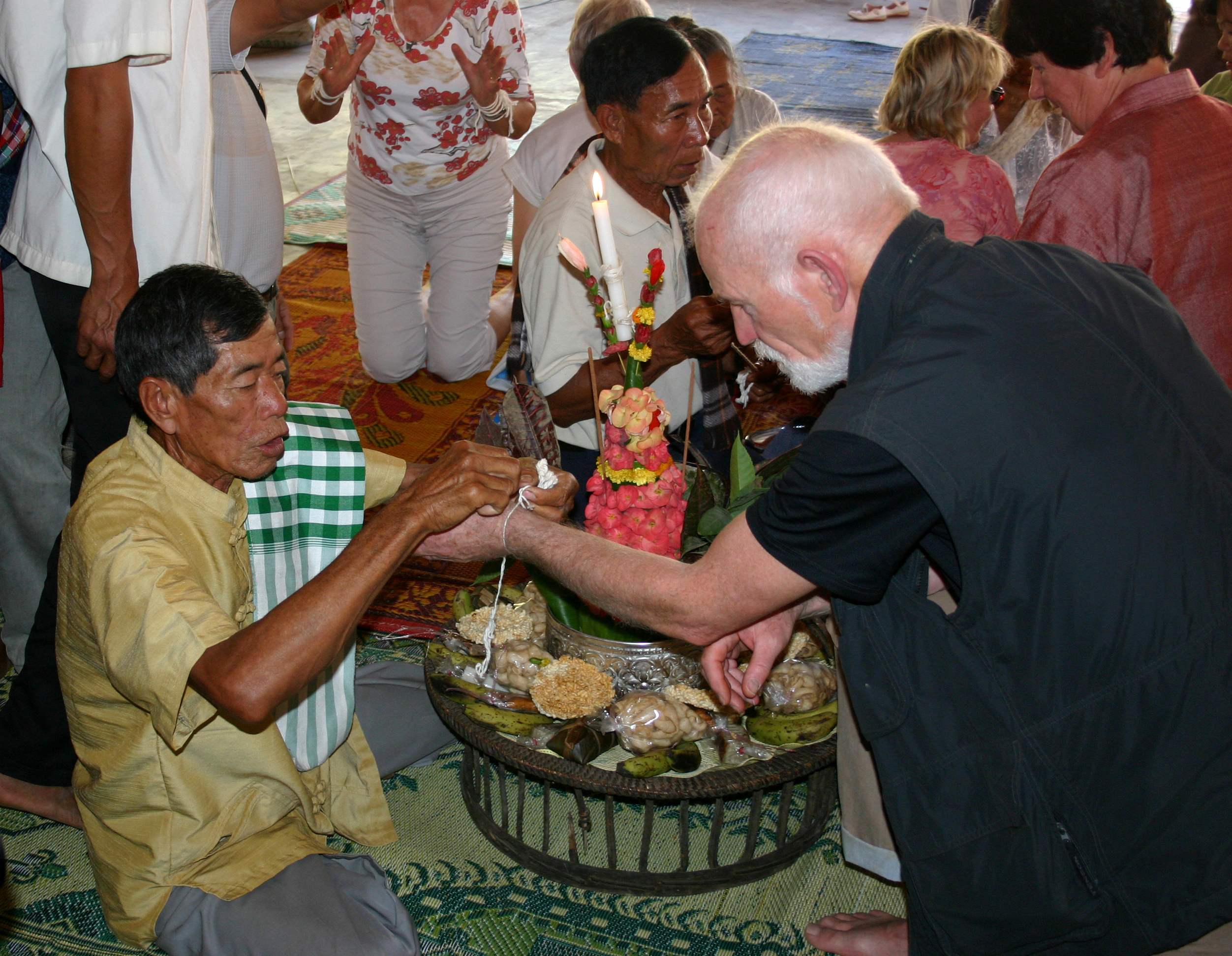
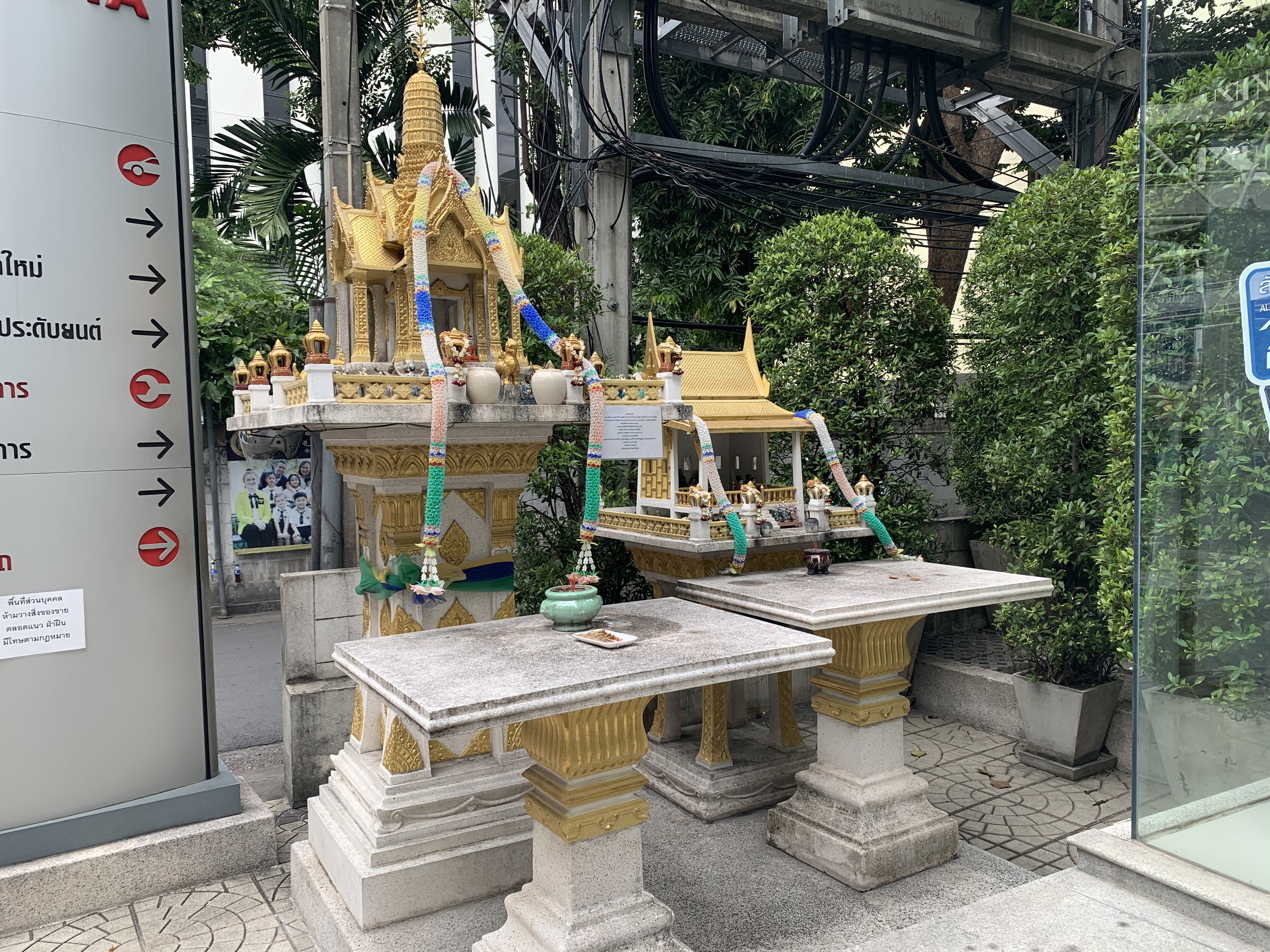
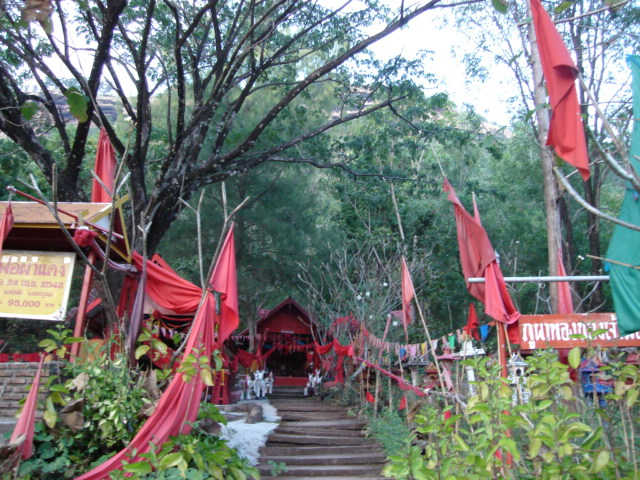
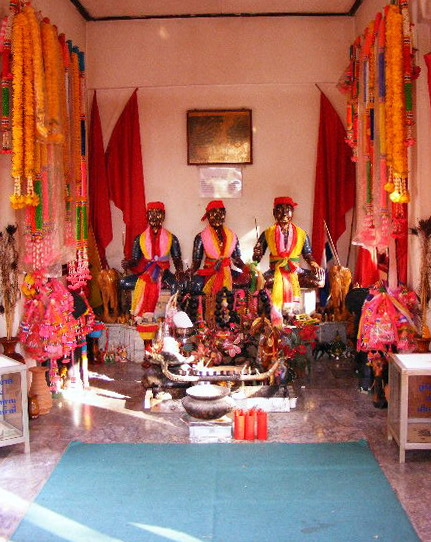
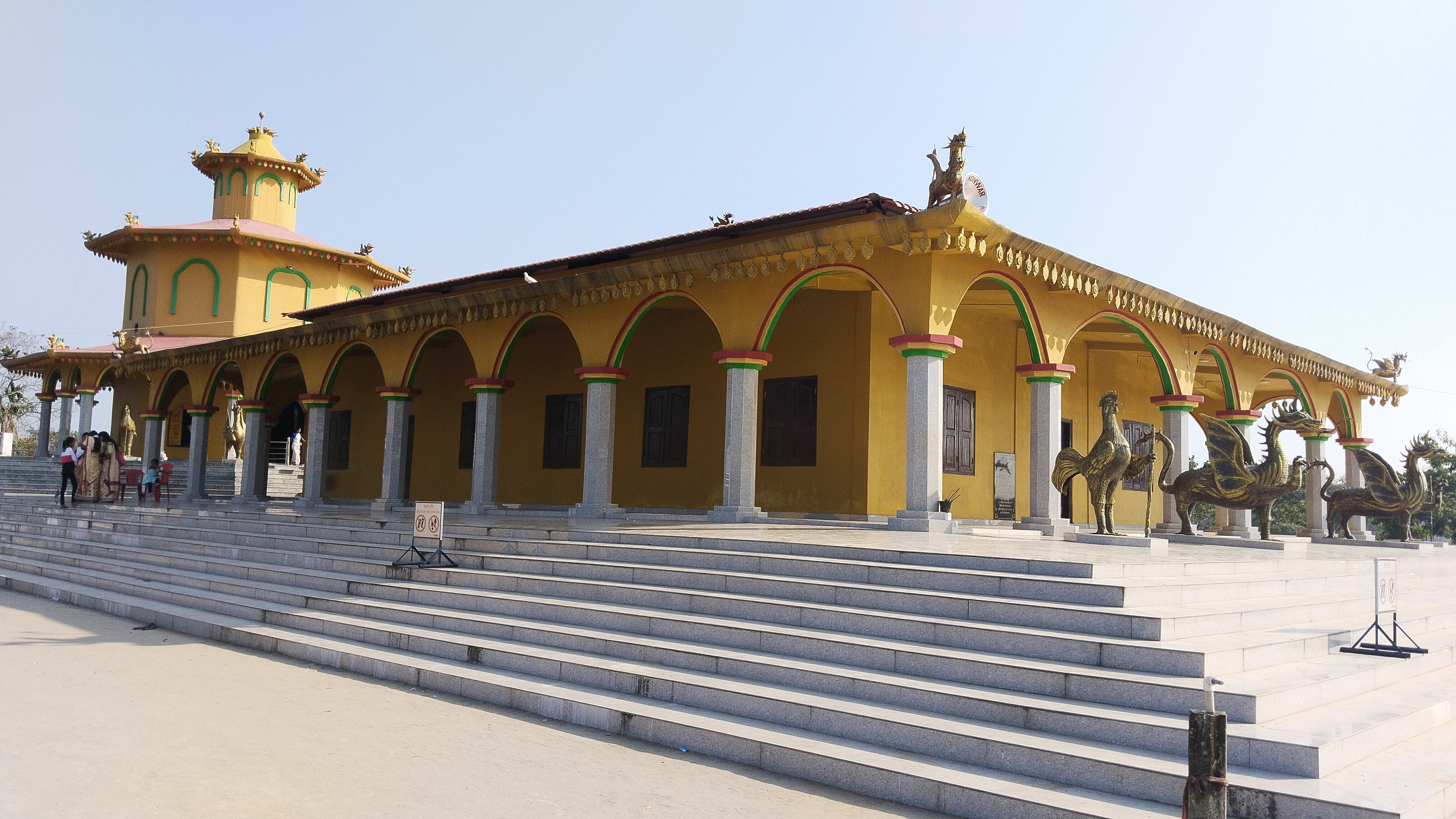
- Various forms of worshipping and Phi in Tai folk religion (left to right, top to bottom): Phra Mae Ya of Sukhothai, Thailand · Lak Mueang of Bangkok · Baci - Su Khwan ceremony in Luang Prabang, Laos · Spirit houses in Bangkok · shrine to Chao Pho Pha Daeng, in Lom Sak, Thailand · Chao Pho Bo Lek Nam Phi in Uttaradit, Thailand · Habung Ho Phi, a Tai Ahom temple in Assam, India
- Type: Ethnic
- Region: Southeast Asia, China parts of India (Assam and Arunachal Pradesh)
- Language: Tai languages
- Origin: around the Mekong basin Yunnan, China
- Other names: Satsana Phi, Ban Phi

The Tai folk religion, Tai folk beliefs, Satsana Phi (Lao: ສາສະໜາຜີ, Thai: ศาสนาผี; /sàːt.sa.nǎː.pʰǐː/) or Ban Phi (Ahom: 𑜈𑜃𑜫 𑜇𑜣), is the ancient native ethnic religion of the Tai people still practiced by various Tai groups. Tai folk religion was dominant among Tai people in Asia until the arrival of Hinduism and Buddhism. It is primarily based on worshipping deities called Phi, Khwan and Ancestors.

In Thailand, the vernacular religion dissimilated into the mainstream Buddhism and Hinduism after their arrivals in the region. Sujit Wongthes, a leading author in Tai folk religion, termed the practice of Buddhism in Thailand as "Thai religion"; a mixture of Buddhism, Hinduism, and Tai folk religion.

== History ==
In a study of Tai folk religion in Tai Ahom, Shrutashwinee Gogoi suggested that it was originated in Yunnan province of China and is primarily based on ancestor veneration. This practice of ancestor worship was borrowed from Confucianism. It is a syncretic mixture Buddhist and Tai folk practices with local traditional beliefs in mainland Southeast Asia.

Thai historian and leading author in Tai Folk Religion, Sujit Wongthes, however, suggested that the religion is a vernacular belief system of spirit worship that has been practiced in the region around the Mekong for more than 3,000 years.

== Deities ==
Tai folk religion is primarily based on deities such as Phi, Khwan, Dam (ancestors).

=== Ancestors ===
The Tai folk religion is primarily based on ancestor veneration. Worshiping ancestors is very important for any follower, though each ethnic group has different specific practices and beliefs. The Tai Ahom called spirits Phi Dam, the Khmu call them hrooy, and the Lao Loum call them phi.

=== Phi ===
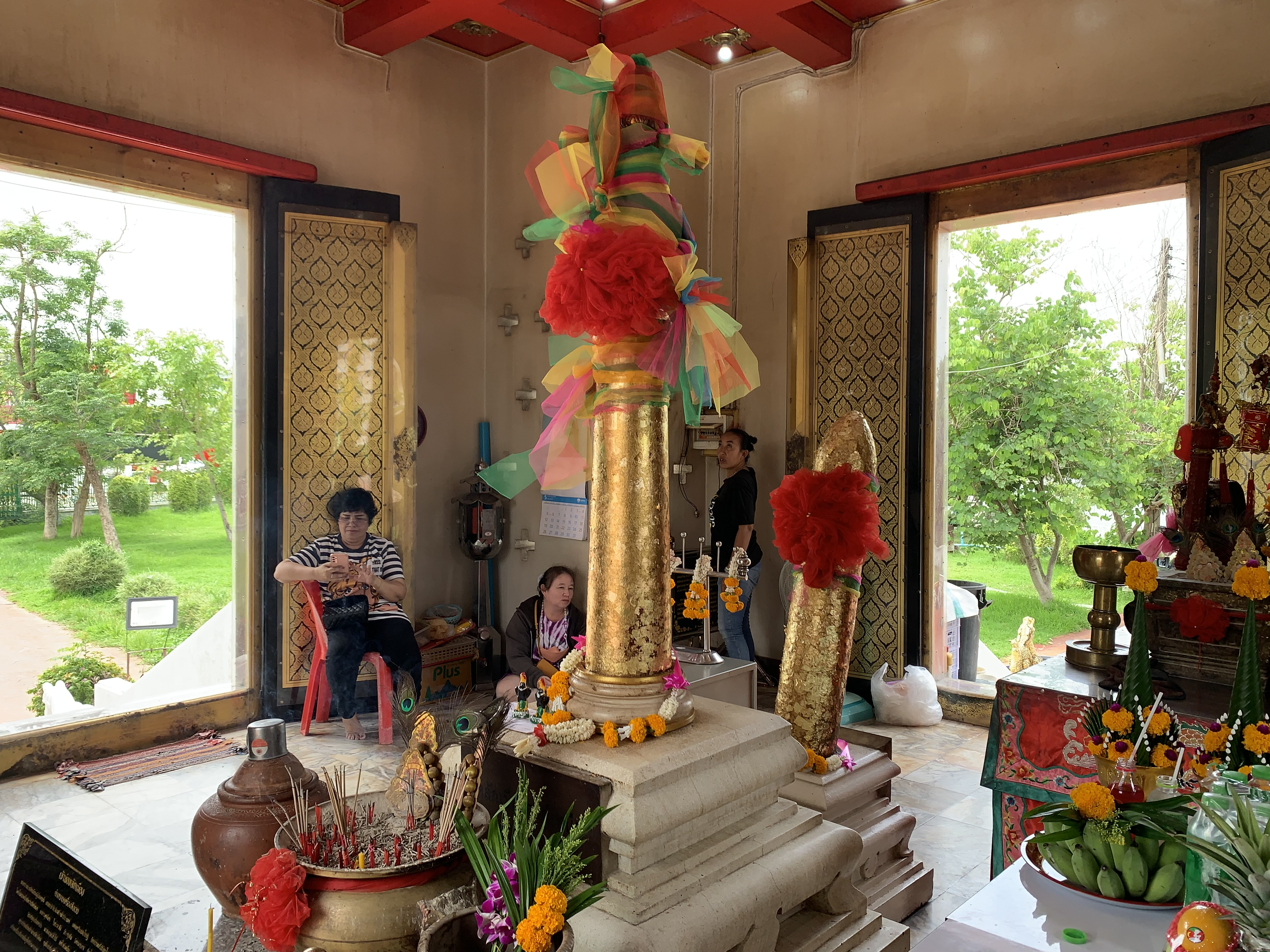
Lak Mueang of Nakhon Nayok, Thailand

Within the Tai folk religion deities are called Phi (ຜີ, ผี, [pʰiː]). These deities of Tai folk religion can also be ancestral spirits, or other types of angels. Such deities often interact with the world of the living, at times protecting people, and at other times seeming to cause harm. Tai-Lao of Bassac have the belief system that Khwan of living person transform to Phi after death. Guardian deities of places, such as the phi wat (ຜີວັດ, ผีวัด) of temples and the lak mueang (ຫລັກເມືອງ, หลักเมือง, [lak mɯːaŋ]) of towns are celebrated and propitiated with communal gatherings and offerings of food. Gods of animist derivation are included in the Satsana Phi pantheon of gods, as well as several indigenous pre-buddhist gods called phi thien (ຜີແຖນ, ผีแถน). Gods are ubiquitous, with some of them being associated with the universal elements: heaven, earth, fire, and water. Guardian angels of people often include ancestors or angelic-beings who arrive at various points in life, better known as thewada. Malevolent spirits (phi phetu) include those khwan of people who were bad in past lives or died of tragic deaths, such as the ghastly phi pob (ຜີປອບ, ผีปอบ) and the vampirical phi dip (ຜີດິບ, ผีดิบ). Deities associated with specific places such as the household, the river, or a grove of trees are neither inherently benevolent nor evil, and occasional offerings ensure their favor and assistance in human affairs. Lowland Thai and Lao villages believe they are protected by the phi ban, which requires an annual offering to ensure the continued prosperity of the village. The village ritual specialist presides over this major ritual, which in the past often involved the sacrifice of a water buffalo and is still an occasion for closing the village to any outsiders for a day. To liang phi ban (feed the village spirit) also serves an important social function by reaffirming the village boundaries and the shared interests of all villagers.

=== Khwan ===
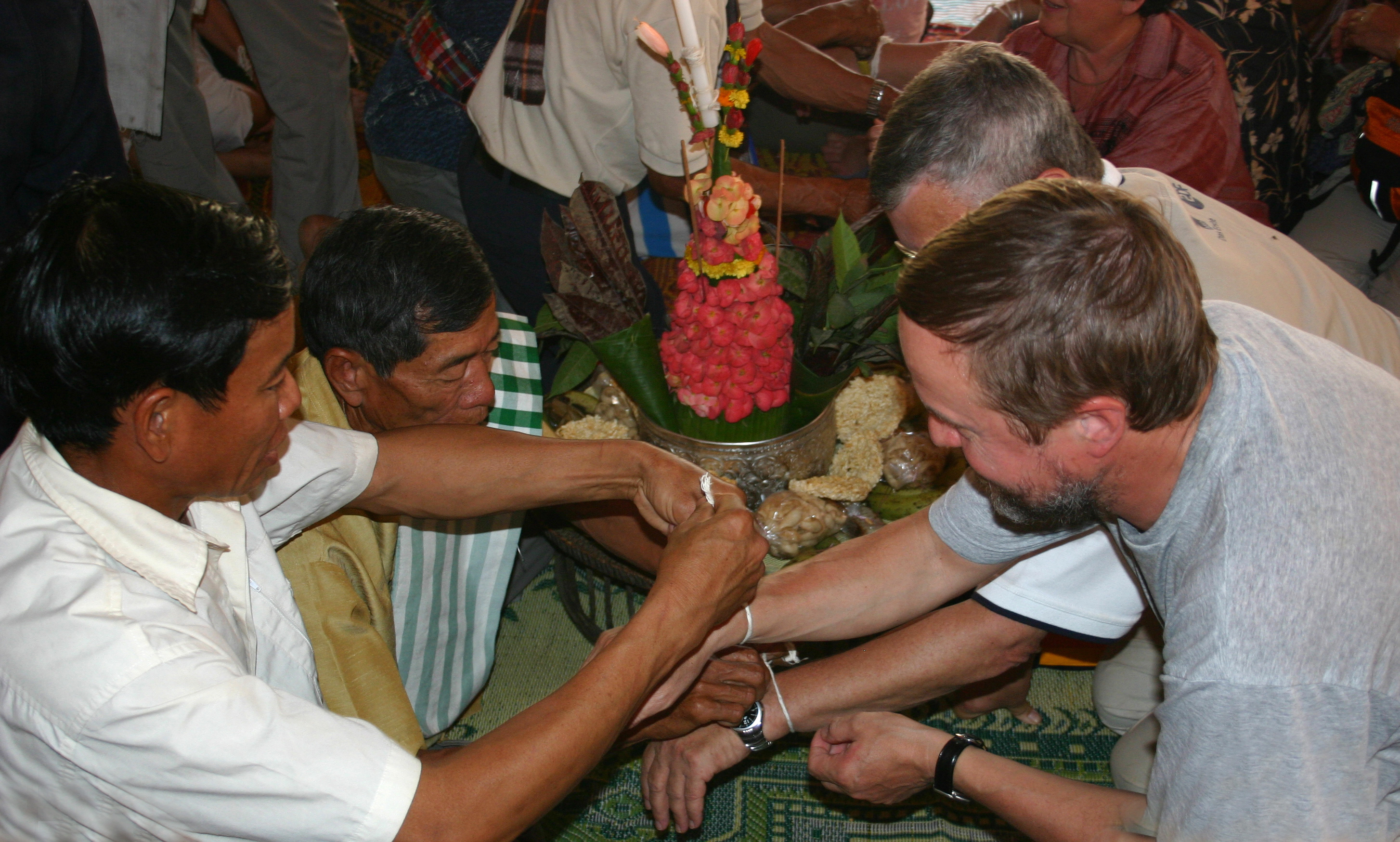
Baci - Su Khwan ceremony is tied to the concept of Khwan, pictured here performed in Luang Prabang, Laos

All Tai people believe in Khwan, the element of vitality and longevity present in living things, similar to a guiding spirit. Its belief system features thirty-two typically protective khwan in various parts of the body. The word khwan has different forms in the various Tai languages: khwan among the Tai-Ahom, Tai Yai (Shan), Dai, Thai-Lao (ຂວັນ, ขวัญ) and Tai-Lue, xen or xwan among the White Tai, khuan among the Tai-Nùng and Tày, min among Tai Daeng people (Red Tai) and hon among the Dioi. Various rituals are performed by various Tai groups to worship the Khwan.

Rik-Khwan

Tai-Ahom has a ritual known as Rik-Khwan, with Rik meaning "to call." Khwans are called for vitality at various stages: for a village, the ceremony is called Mueang Khwan Ban, while for a Mueang or country, it is called Rik Khwan Mueang Khwan. Rik-Khwan are performed in three main types, being Leng Phun Rik khwan, Cham Phun Rik khon and Ha-Phun Rik khwan.

Baci or Bai Sri Su Khwan

At certain special occasions during the course of an individual's life, such as a pending marriage, a job change, or other times of high uncertainty, certain Baci (ບາສີ, [bàː.sǐː], บายศรีสู่ขวัญ, [baːi̯.sǐː.sùː.kʰwán]) ceremonies are sometimes performed for the benefit of an individual, with the aim of properly re-binding such "khwan" body-spirits back to one's body, as the unintentional loosening of such bonds is believed to possibly risk illness or harm. The baci rite calls on all thirty-two khwan to return to one's self to bestow health, prosperity, and well-being on the affected participant. During such ceremonies, cotton strings are often tied around a participant's wrists to keep the spirits in place. The baci ceremony can also be performed to welcome guests to one's home, before and after making a long trip, as a curing ritual or after recovery from an illness. The rite is also the central ritual for both the Lao Loum wedding ceremony and for the naming ceremony of a newborn child.

== Temples ==
The temple in Tai folk religion has various forms and names. Tai Ahom has the system of sacred worship place named Sheng Ruen. Most people pay respect to the deities that reside in temples, who are thought to protect the general vicinity of the temple from harm. These temples are essentially miniature shrines, built to represent the presence of the deity of the shrine, just as a full size shrine is meant to represent such a "presence." Offerings of flowers, incense, and candles are given, and the spirits are consulted during times of change or hardship for protection and assistance. Natural deities include those that reside in trees, mountains, or forests.

== Priests ==
=== Mophi ===
A class of priests called mophi (mo-phi ໝໍຜີ, หมอผี), "tellers", are locally trained shamans, specialists in the rituals and in communication with their personal angels and gods in general. Using trances, sacred objects imbued with supernatural power, or saksit, possessions, and rituals like lam phi fa (ລຳຜີຟ້າ, ลำผีฟ้า, [lam pʰiː faː]) or baci, the shaman is often consulted during times of trouble, hauntings, and illness or other misfortune that might be caused by malevolent or unhappy spirits. They are also usually present during religious festivals.

=== Molung ===
Ahoms have priestly clans known as Molung. There are three divisions: Mo-sai, Mo-hong, and Mo-Pong.

== Population ==
In the case of Ahom, the three priestly clans (Mo'sam, Mo'hung, Mo'Plong) follow Tai folk religion traditionally. Approximately 30% of the Lao population are followers of Tai folk religion; however, due to Buddhism's role in Laos as a state religion, the Tai folk belief system is not officially recognized. Among the Lao, the Lao Loum and Lao Lom are predominantly Buddhist, while the Lao Theung and Lao Sung are predominantly folk religious. Laotian Buddhism is influenced by Tai folk religion.

== Ceremonies ==
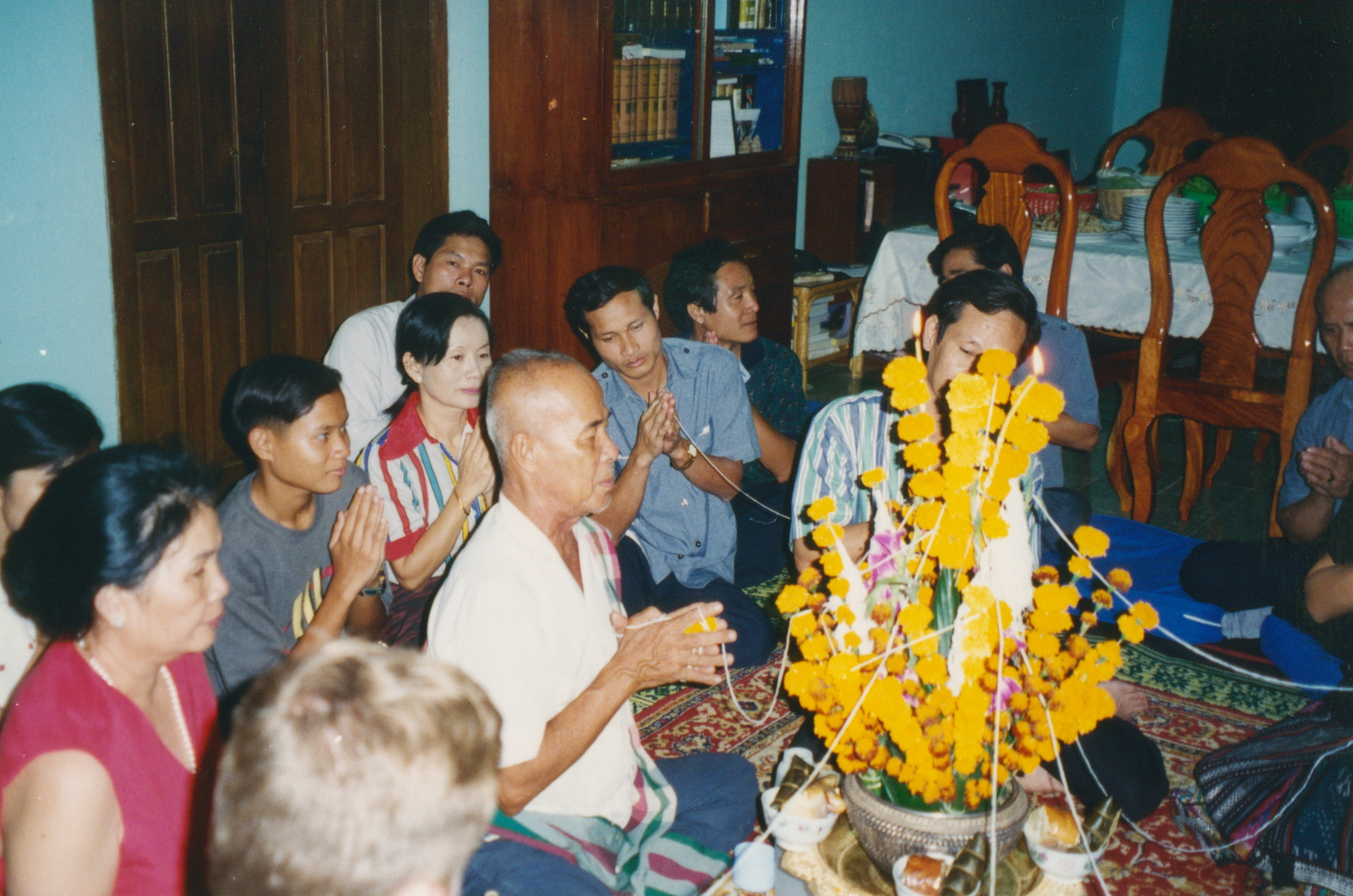
A baci rite conducted by a family in Vientiane

Ceremonies devoted to the gods commonly involve an offering of a chicken and rice wine. Once the gods have taken the spiritual essence of the offering, people may consume the earthly remains. The head of a household or the individual who wants to gain the favor of the gods usually performs the ritual. In many villages, a person, usually an older man believed to have special knowledge of the gods, may be asked to choose an auspicious day for weddings or other important events, or for household rites.

== Variations ==
=== Ahom religion ===
The Ahom religion has the same belief in phi, khwan and ancestor worship. They offer chicken and a traditional rice beer, known as lao, in the Ancestor Worship ceremony of Phi Dam (Ancestor Spirit) and Ban-Phi (Village Spirit).

=== Lamet religion ===
The Lamet people have similar beliefs, and each village must have one ritualist (xemia), who is responsible for making all sacrifices to village gods. He also supervises communal houses and officiates at the construction of any new houses. When a ritual practitioner dies, one of his sons is elected by the married men of the village to be his successor. If he has no sons, then one of his brother's sons is chosen.

Important to the Lamet are Ancestral spirits (mbrong n'a), which are said to live in homes and look out for the well-being of the entire household. No activity is undertaken without informing them. The spirits of the ancestors are fond of buffalos; thus, buffalo skulls or horns from sacrifices are hung at the altar of the ancestors or under the gable of the house. Numerous taboos regarding behavior in the house are observed to avoid offending ancestral spirits.

== See also ==
- Chinese folk religion
- Mo (religion)
- Vietnamese folk religion
- Yao folk religion
- Muong ethnic religion
- Thai folklore
- Saiyasat
