= Yao folk religion =

Ethnic religion of the Yao people in China

Yao folk religion, also known as Meishan Sect (梅山教) is the ethnic religion of the Yao people, a non-Sinitic ethnic group who reside in the Guangxi, Hunan and surrounding provinces of China. Their religion has been profoundly intermingled with Taoism since the 13th century, so much that it is frequently defined as Yao Taoism (瑶族道教 Yáozú Dàojiào). In the 1980s it was found that the Yao clearly identified with the Chinese-language Taoist theological literature, seen as a prestigious statute of culture (文化 wénhuà).

Yao folk religion was described by a Chinese scholar of the half of the 20th century as an example of deep "Taoisation" (道教化 Dàojiàohuà). Yao core theology and cosmology is Taoist; they worship the deities of canonical Taoism (above all the Three Pure Ones) as the principal deities, while lesser gods are those who pertain to their own indigenous pre-Taoisation religion.

The reason of this tight identification of Yao religion and identity with Taoism is that in Yao society every male adult is initiated as a Taoist, and Yao Taoism is therefore a communal religion; this is in sharp contrast to Chinese Taoism, which is an order of priests disembedded from the common Chinese folk religion. A shared sense of Yao identity is based additionally on tracing their descent from the mythical ancestor Panhu.

== Social aspects ==
Yao Taoism has been seen as representing a conservative form of religious practice, exhibiting parallels with the communitarian Taoism that flourished with the earliest Taoist movements in China proper and the collective fasts of medieval China. Although the Yao are speakers of non-Sinitic Mienic languages, their Taoist liturgical tradition is in Chinese language and writing.

The strong identity of Yao society as a Taoist Church, and their high literacy, are seen as the factors of Southeast Asian Yaos' proud resistance to Christian missionary penetration of their communities in the 1960s and 1970s.

== Priesthood ==
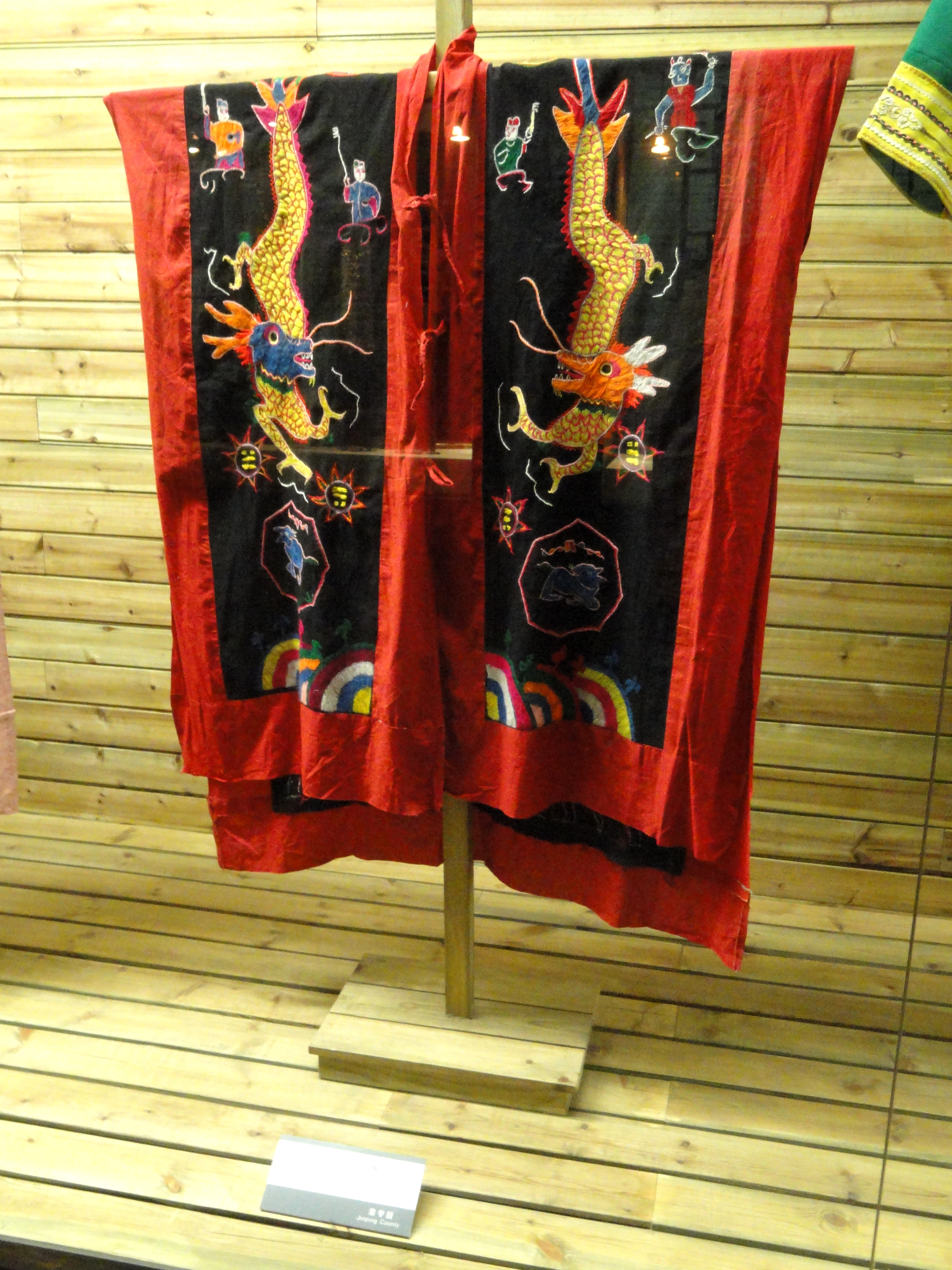
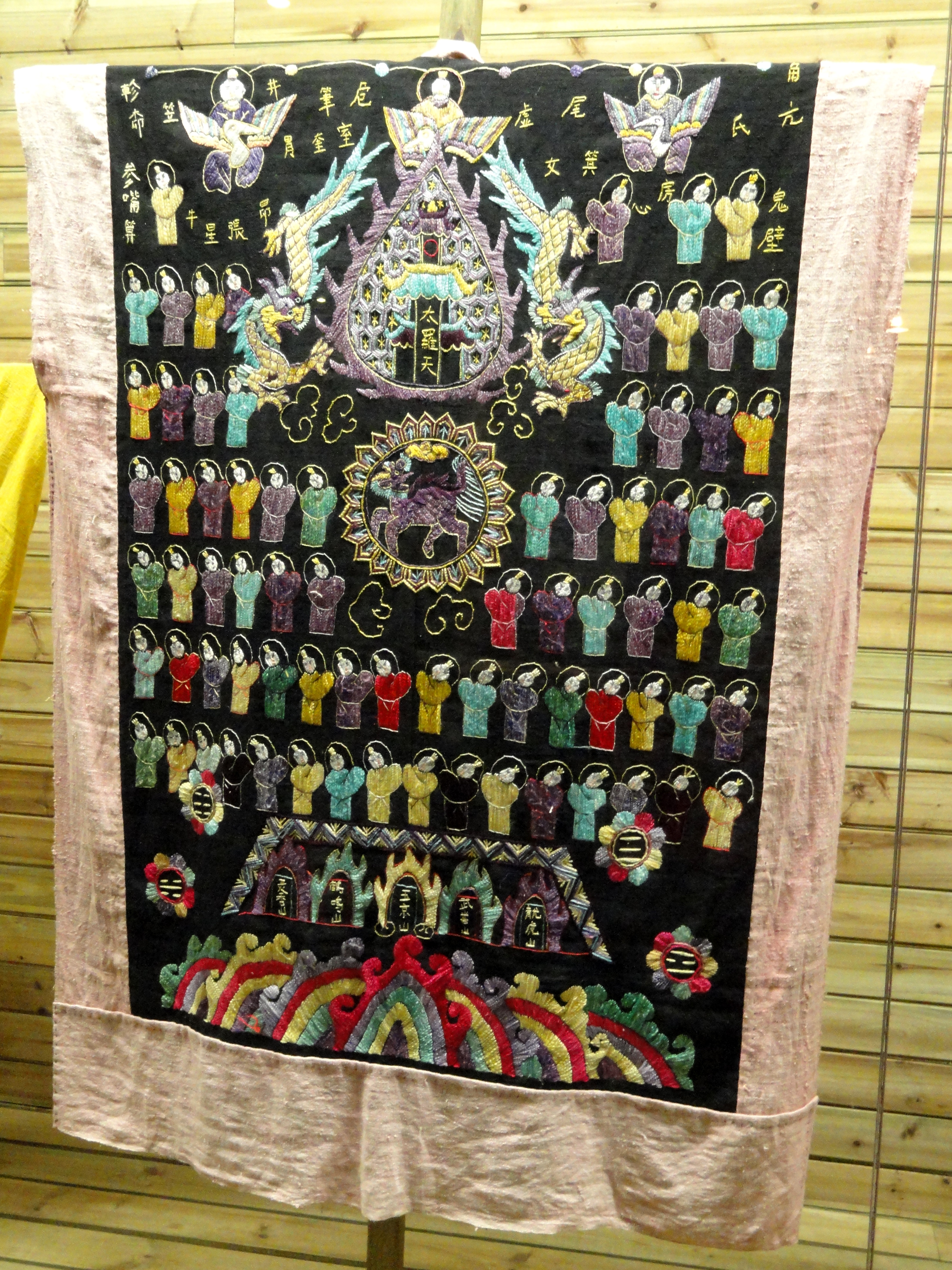
Yao Taoist robes preserved at Yunnan Nationalities Museum

In Yao religion all adult males are initiated to some degree into the Taoist clergy. The tsow say ong are high priests who perform rites for the higher gods of the pantheon ("above the sky") and officiate funerals. The Yao folk religion otherwise retains a class of lesser priests or shamans, the sip mien, who perform rituals for the lesser gods ("under the sky").

There are four levels of initiation into the Yao Taoist church, they are called: "hanging the lamps" (kwa-tang), "ordination of the master" (tou-sai), after which ordinates are given a sigil and a certificate to perform a variety of rites, and the two additional levels of "adding duties" (chia-tse) and "enfeoffing liturgies" (pwang-ko).

The Sai nzung sou is the book of ceremonies for inviting the mienv zoux ziouv, good spirits who protect the location. The mienv morh are instead angry spirits who cause sickness and tragedy.

== House altar ==
The mienv baaih is the Yao household altar of the gods, in a place easily visible from the main door. Its aim is welcoming the spirits (mienv). The mienv kuv is a tablet with the names of the ancestors of the family placed upon the altar; another custom is the use of pictures of the ancestors instead of the tablets.

=== Gods ===
The regional hunter god Zhang Wulang (Chinese: 张五郎) serves as both an exorcist and a psychopomp in Yao folk religion. Historically, as Yao communities migrated south into Guangxi, Guangdong, and Southeast Asia, they continued to view the Meishan region (in modern Hunan) as their sacred ancestral homeland. Yao ritual texts, including those studied by French anthropologist Jacques Lemoine, detail a belief system where the souls of the dead must return to the "Caves of Meishan" (梅山洞) to find peace. Zhang Wulang is enshrined on Yao altars specifically because he is believed to guide and protect these souls on their journey back to the ancestors.

== Rituals and psychology ==
After the death of a person, the priests perform the zoux caeqv, a ceremony to deliver the person's body from sin. Then the priest perform a water ritual, the zoux sin, for purifying the person's dead body from evil spirits. Subsequently, the priest performs the doh dangh caeqv jaiv, a ceremony to purify the soul of the dead person from the influence of evil spirits.

The zoux sin-seix is an ending ritual to give the spirit a peaceful after-life. Other practices involve spirit money and sacrifice.

== See also ==
- Chinese folk religion
- Chinese ritual mastery traditions
- Laotian folk religion
- Miao folk religion
