= Non-Human =

Chinese name
- Chinese: 非人哉
Transcriptions
Standard Mandarin
- Hanyu Pinyin: Fēi Rén Zāi
- Genre: Comedy, girly, fantasy
- Written by: Yi Wang Kong Qi
- Starring: Jiuyue; Ao Lie; Nezha; Guanyin; Xiaotian; Xiaoyu; Jingwei; Xingtian; Narrator
- Voices of: Mie Mie; Bao Mu Zhongyang; Shan Xin; Jiang Guangtao; Su Shangqing; C Xiaodiao; Youwu Yueshan; Tu Te Hameng; Ding Dang
- Music by: Beijing Onyi Cultural Communication Co., Ltd.

Production
- Animator: Fenzi Interactive Tencent Penguin Pictures
- Production company: China Friendship Publishing Company

Original release
- Network: Sina Weibo, U17, and NetEase Comics
- Release: August 21, 2015 – present

Non-Human (Chinese: 非人哉; pinyin: Fēi Rén Zāi) is a four-panel and multi-panel comic series serialized on platforms such as Sina Weibo, U17, NetEase Comics (discontinued), and Bilibili Comics. It is created by the comic artist Yi Wang Kong Qi and was originally titled "Shen Me Gui" (literally "What the Hell"). The series began serialization on its official Weibo account on August 21, 2015, and was later launched on U17 on April 1, 2016. The comic tells the story of a group of legendary gods and monsters struggling to live and work in the capital city.

The series was later adapted into an animated show. On March 16, 2018, the official Weibo account released a music video for the animation, with the theme song performed by the virtual singer Luo Tianyi. The animation premiered exclusively on Tencent Video on March 29, 2018, and later began streaming on Bilibili from February 7, 2019. It also started airing on Japan's TV Tokyo on July 5, 2023.

== Animation ==
=== Voice Cast (Mainland China) ===
- Jiuyue (September) – Mie Mie
- Ao Lie – Bao Mu Zhong Yang
- Nezha – Shan Xin
- Guanyin – Jiang Guangtao
- Xiaotian – Su Shangqing
- Xiaoyu – C Xiaodiao
- Jingwei – You Wu Yue Shan
- Xingtian – Tu Te Ha Meng
- Yang Jian – Zhang Jie
- Hong Hai'er – Chang Rongshan
- Longnü – Ye Zhiqiu
- Daji – Si Dao Hui Zhang
- Nian Shou – Tu Te Ha Meng
- Shiyiyue (November) – Li Lanling
- Bai Ze / Narrator – Ding Dang

=== Character Introduction ===
- Jiuyue (September): A nine-tailed fox who has cultivated for 200 years. Living in the capital city, she tries hard to adapt to modern society and works at a company run by Maitreya. She can transform but usually appears as a kemonomimi girl. A hardcore otaku and relative of Daji. She had a crush on Xiaotian in middle school but is currently single by choice. Has a keen sense of smell to detect supernatural beings, though often misidentifies them.
- Ao Lie: The third prince of the West Sea Dragon King, nicknamed "Lie Lie." He once carried Tang Sanzang on the Journey to the West and is Jiuyue's high school classmate and coworker. Appears as a humanoid dragon and occasionally reminisces about his horse form. His throat connects to the sea, allowing him to spray water, fire, and seafood. A postgraduate of Dragon Palace University—high IQ but low EQ, especially in love.
- Nezha: Son of Li Jing, the Pagoda-Bearing Heavenly King, with a strained relationship with his father. His body is made of lotus root, allowing him to make lotus root soup anytime, and when exposed to water, lotus flowers grow on his head. His nickname is "Ou Ba" (a pun in Chinese sounding like the Korean word for "older brother"), and he often streams online under the name "Ou Si Ni Ba" (a pun meaning "I'm your dad"). Although he looks like a toddler, he is actually over 3,000 years old. Because his father needed treatment for hair loss, Guanyin became his guardian. Due to his extremely cute appearance, he was mistaken for a girl and angrily cut his hair short. He likes dragons and often hangs out with Ao Lie. He is a natural enemy of dragons. Skilled in using Samadhi True Fire. Not good at studying, especially English, which he rarely passes. Usually has a poker face with no emotional expression, even when crying. He gets drunk from drinking coffee.
- Guanyin: A male bodhisattva and Nezha's guardian. Owns a jade vase that looks like a coffee cup, a power-generating aura device, and a high-speed lotus seat. Loves coffee and collecting mythical creatures. Obsessed with horses and often turns others into them. Has a childish rivalry with Yang Jian.
- Xiaotian: A Chinese Xiquan dog raised by Yang Jian, capable of transforming into a human when petted. Loves Xiaoyu, which is later revealed to be a hunting instinct. Overly possessive of his master and gets jealous. He's a goofy character, scared of heights, but swims very well.
- Xiaoyu: Chief of the Moon Palace moon rabbits, she oversees over 80 million jade rabbits. Having spent countless years surrounded by mooncakes, she has developed a deep hatred for them. She moved to Earth and left management to her subordinates—the Bo Yikao trio. She loves Earth-grown carrots. Though she appears cute and gentle, her combat power is off the charts, especially when she sees someone eating mooncakes or rabbit meat. She has been a sworn enemy of the Moon Palace Jin Chan for thousands of years.
- Jingwei: Originally the youngest daughter of the Yan Emperor, she drowned in the East Sea and was reborn as a bird with a determined mission to fill the sea. She has a compulsive urge to bury any body of water she sees with stones. Though she appears as a young girl, she is actually over 5,000 years old. Her husband is a storm petrel who usually stays perched on her head in the form of an ordinary bird. She has many children and possesses a strong maternal instinct.
- Xingtian: A headless ancient war god defeated by the Yellow Emperor. Uses his nipples as eyes and navel as mouth. Obsessed with face masks, chest warmers, and cleavage-revealing sweaters. Deeply desires a head.
- Yang Jian: Nephew of the Jade Emperor and master of Xiaotian. Once a mighty heavenly general, now a fluffy and quirky uncle-type figure. Loves furry animals but is allergic to fur. Runs a pet café. Constantly bickers with Guanyin.
- Hong Hai'er: Son of the Bull Demon King and Princess Iron Fan; now a disciple of Guanyin. Has a fiery temper and uses Samadhi True Fire. Mistook Nezha for a girl, then became his self-declared rival. Very intelligent and often helps Nezha and Dragon Girl with homework.
- Longnü: Daughter of the East Sea Dragon King and sister of Ao Bing, niece to Ao Lie. Ran away from home after a quarrel with her father and was saved by Red Boy. Like Ao Lie, her throat connects to the sea, and she throws up seafood when carsick. Performs poorly in school and often skips class with Nezha.
- Daji: Jiuyue's "grandma" (not biologically related), a millennia-old nine-tailed fox who once seduced mortals but now lives peacefully in Fox Village. Sometimes disguises as a young girl to date handsome men. Only drinks red tea at exactly 80°C—anything else will make her furious. Deeply concerned about Jiuyue's romantic life.
- Nian Shou: An ancient Mythical Beast that used to terrorize people but became weak after humans invented firecrackers. It currently lives in Guanyin's home but still hasn't given up on its dream of world domination. Every Chinese New Year, it comes out to cause trouble but always ends up getting thoroughly beaten. Doing bad deeds makes it grow larger, while doing good deeds has the opposite effect. It was later revealed that it's actually a minor demon that appeared only a few hundred years ago, but was mistaken for a millennia-old beast due to folk legends.
- Shiyiyue (November): Jiuyue's older brother. Was a top student and successful adult but sold his house for world travel. Ended up homeless and had to stay with Jiuyue. Eventually kicked out and now co-rents with Xiaotian, relying on part-time jobs and tricks to survive.
- Bai Ze: An ancient mythical beast who understands all things and knows the true forms of ghosts, gods, and spirits, causing them to reveal their real appearances in fear. Possesses the ability to break the fourth wall, directly communicating with readers and viewers. Can read others' hearts and is fluent in various animal languages. Makes a living by writing books and running an online store, writing under the pen name "Hei Chi." Though his works cover a wide range of topics, few have sold well; however, some of his scripts have been adapted into popular TV dramas. Once homeless, he was later taken in by Guanyin. A complete otaku who gets dizzy and nauseous whenever he leaves home and dislikes doing housework, often appearing messy. He lived in ancient times and met the Yellow Emperor, for whom he created the "Bai Ze Illustrated Guide to Spirits," a work he has yet to finish—he is even urged to continue it in his dreams by the Yellow Emperor. At the end of each episode of the animation, he hosts a segment called "Bai Ze is Here," where he tells stories of Chinese mythology.
- Mao Ri Xingjun: One of the Twenty-Eight Mansions and a good friend of Shiyiyue (November). Originally a rooster, he transforms into a tall and imposing human with a handsome face. His voice is extremely unpleasant—his crow can kill cockroaches—but when he has a cold, it becomes soft and weak. He smells like poultry droppings and, despite usually appearing human, retains bird-like eating habits, loving to eat insects, which makes it hard for him to find a girlfriend.
- Sun Wukong: An idol-level great deity, the Victorious Fighting Buddha, and Ao Lie's senior brother. For over a thousand years, he has been wildly adored by fans and usually appears as a handsome young man. He is sworn brothers with the Bull Demon King and is both the uncle and nemesis of Red Boy. He is very afraid of Guanyin's magical headband. A good friend of Nezha, he also gets drunk from coffee. Often bickers with Yang Jian like children. He always carries his iconic Ruyi Jingu Bang and a distinctive Somersault Cloud. Being a stone monkey, he has a dense body and is therefore poor at swimming.

== Mobile Game ==
On June 13, 2024, the official mobile game Non-Human: Ace Employee (非人哉王牌员工) opened for pre-registration. The game entered open beta on September 24.

== Film ==
In 2024, the Non-Human animated feature film titled Non-Human: Time-Limited Player (非人哉：限时玩家) was officially filed with the China Film Administration. The film follows Jiuyue and her divine companions as they accidentally enter a soon-to-be-shutdown game world. Facing the risk of total erasure, they lead players around the globe on a mission to save a pair of close friends separated by death.

== Reception ==
Non-Human is a short-form Chinese web animation (泡面番) that integrates figures from traditional Chinese mythology into modern urban life. The series has performed well both critically and commercially. It holds a rating of 9.0 on Douban and 9.8 on Bilibili, with cumulative views exceeding 1 billion across major platforms. Its visual style, imaginative narrative structure, and frequent comedic elements have been noted by audiences. For example, the character Jiuyue, a nine-tailed fox, combines mythological traits with modern personality archetypes, while the headless deity Xingtian appears in humorous modern scenarios such as wearing glasses in a movie theater or dealing with summer heat. The storyline incorporates references to The Classic of Mountains and Seas, including a localized reinterpretation of the "gold and silver axe" parable and creative official remarks such as "Xiaotian chasing the Jade Rabbit (Xiaoyu) is a hunt."

Upon release, the first three episodes surpassed 28 million views, with daily rankings placing it among the top ten streamed series. The animation successfully addressed the common challenge of adapting vertical-scroll comics to animated formats, while preserving the sketch-brush art style of the original. The production company, Beijing Fenzi Interactive Cultural Communication Co., Ltd., reimagined mythological figures as coworkers in a modern office setting—examples include Ao Lie's oversized bathtub or round bed designed to accommodate his serpent-like body—offering a humorous yet grounded depiction of myth in everyday life. The creative direction of the series is informed by comic artist Yi Wang Kong Qi's observations of urban youth culture. such as Nezha balancing a lotus flower while floating in water, or Bai Longma becoming visibly nervous around him. These contrasts all resonate with contemporary audiences.

In terms of commercial expansion, the series has partnered with major brands such as Nestlé and Pizza Hut to generate revenue. Its merchandising efforts have been particularly successful, with the "Daydreaming Nezha" blind box co-developed with Pop Mart surpassing 10 million yuan in sales within six months. Derivative products like collectible toys and plush figures are distributed through offline retail channels, accounting for one-third of the company's total revenue. The franchise also participated in the Winter Olympics-themed film Our Winter Olympics, where the character Jiuyue interacts with Bing Dwen Dwen to showcase winter sports. This creatively addressed the challenge of portraying a non-speaking mascot and resonated with audiences through the relatable portrayal of Jiuyue as a "working fox." In addition, after Non-Human was released overseas, it sparked discussions among Japanese netizens, with some fans learning Chinese in order to follow the series.

== Awards ==
| year | Award Ceremony | Awards | result | Ginseng |
|---|---|---|---|---|
| 2017 | The 14th China Animation Golden Dragon Awards | Silver Award for Best Narrative Comic | Awards | |
| 2023 | The 3rd Tsai Chih Chung Comics Awards | Most Popular Youth Award | Awards | |

== See also ==
- Tencent Animation and Comics
- Our Winter Olympics
