= One Hundred Thousand Bad Jokes (film) =

- Directed by: Lu Hengyu; Li Shujie
- Production companies: Wanda Media; Shanghai Toonmax Media; Paramount Pictures; Nickelodeon Movies; Tencent Pictures; U-17; Spin Master Entertainment
- Distributed by: Wanda Media (China); Paramount Pictures (USA and International)
- Release date: December 31, 2014 (China)
- Running time: 100 minutes
- Country: China
- Language: Mandarin
- Box office: CN¥119.8 million (China)

One Hundred Thousand Bad Jokes (Chinese: 十万个冷笑话; pinyin: Shí Wàn Gè Lěng Xiàohuà) is a 2014 Chinese animated fantasy comedy film directed by Lu Hengyu and Li Shujie. It was released on December 31.

== Voice cast ==
- Ketsu
- Huangzhenji
- Bao Mu Zhong Yang
- Xin Shan
- Zhuquecheng
- Hameng Tute
- Lu Hengyu
- Sidaohuizhang

== Reception ==
The film earned CN¥119.8 million at the Chinese box office.

== See also ==
- One Hundred Thousand Bad Jokes
