= U17 Comics =

Chinese webcomic platform

U17 Original Comic DreamWorks
- Website type: Purely original comics website
- Available in: Chinese
- Creators: Beijing April Star Network Technology Co., Ltd.
- Founders: Zhou Jingqi, Dong Zhiling, Yu Xianghua
- Website: www.u17.com （As of 2022, the original U17.com domain redirects to Bilibili Comics）
- Commercial: yes
- Users: 7.3 million registered users
- Launched: October 15, 2009; 16 years ago
- Current status: Close

U17 Original Comic DreamWorks (Chinese: 有妖气原创漫画梦工厂), commonly known as U17 Comics, was a Chinese webcomic platform founded on October 15, 2009, by Zhou Jingqi (also known as "Yaoqijun")，Dong Zhiling, and Yu Xianghua under Beijing April Star Network Technology Co., Ltd. It became one of China’s most influential original comics communities, hosting tens of thousands of comics and millions of users. Its virtual mascots were YaoQi Niang and Yao Guoshou. In 2015, it was acquired by Alpha Group, and in 2022, it was shut down and merged into Bilibili Comics.

== History ==
Beijing April Star Network Technology Co., Ltd.
- Native name: 北京四月星空网络技术有限公司Beijing April Star Network Technology Co., Ltd.
- Type: Private
- Founded: 30 April 2009; 17 years ago
- Founder: Zhou Jingqi (Yaoqijun), Dong Zhiling, Yu Xianghua
- Headquarters: ChinaBeijingDongcheng District 2nd Floor, 77 Cultural and Creative Industry Park, No. 77, Art Museum Back Street
- Area served: China
- Products: U17
- Parent: bilibili
- Website: www.u17.com （As of 2022, the original U17.com domain redirects to Bilibili Comics）

U17.com was founded in 2006 as a small online website for post-80s anime fans to communicate (u17.com.cn). At that time, the founder Zhou Jingqi shared his collection of domestic and foreign comics on the website. In June 2009, U17 received investment from Shanda Network and began commercial operations, and has since transformed into an original comic platform. On September 15, 2009, the website began internal testing. On October 15, 2009, the website was officially launched.

U17 Comics attracted a group of outstanding original comic creators. According to official data from the U17 website, as of February 2012, the site had an average of 8 million daily page views, around 15 million monthly visits, over 6,000 comic titles, and more than 2,000 comic creators. By early 2013, U17 had 3 million registered users and over 20 million monthly visitors. The platform claimed to update 5,000 comic chapters each month. In early 2015, U17 held over 60% of the comic market share, offered around 8,000 comic titles, had more than 6 million registered users, and maintained a monthly user base of 20 to 30 million visitors.

On August 11, 2015, Alpha Group announced the acquisition of 100% equity of Beijing April Star Network Technology Co., Ltd. (the parent company of U17) for 904 million RMB. According to official statistics at the time, U17 had over 7.3 million registered users and 8 million active visitors, with an average of 800,000 daily page views. The platform hosted 17,000 resident comic creators and had 40,000 ongoing serialized comics, with over 100 titles considered highly popular.

On November 19, 2021, according to a disclosure by Alpha Group in a Shenzhen Stock Exchange announcement, Bilibili had acquired full ownership of U17 Comics.

On September 1, 2022, U17 Comics announced that it would shut down on December 31, and that its services would continue on Bilibili Comics in the future.

== Interaction ==
=== Commenting System ===
In 2010, U17 Comics launched a "commenting" feature that allowed readers to leave messages at any point on a comic page. On December 2, 2014, the Ministry of Culture of the People's Republic of China released a blacklist of illegal and non-compliant websites, conducted investigations into top-ranking online comic platforms for violent and pornographic content. Liu Qiang, Deputy Director of the Cultural Market Department, stated: “Users can post comments anywhere within comic content, but there are no restrictions or filters on what they say. As a result, users' language, combined with vulgar imagery, has become increasingly explicit and obscene.”

=== Dubbing lines ===
On August 1, 2013, U17 Comics launched a 15-day beta test of its comic voice acting system, which allowed users to add voiceovers to comics. The purpose of this feature was to enhance the reading experience and discover talented voice actors. Readers could “like” the voiceovers they enjoyed, and those with more likes would rank higher. From its launch in August to September 9, the platform recorded over 100,000 voice clips.

== Profit and Operation ==
U17 Comics’revenue mainly came from on-site advertisements, game co-publishing, and VIP premium services.

=== Uploading Comics ===
Comics on U17 could be uploaded through the website. The platform operated under an open submission model, where registered users were allowed to publish their original comics. Once a chapter was uploaded and passed review, it would be officially displayed on the U17 website.

U17 signed licensing agreements for comic works rather than exclusive contracts with authors. Monthly votes (月票) served as an important source of income for creators. However, even for highly popular works such as One Hundred Thousand Bad Jokes, creators reportedly earned only around 3,000 RMB per month from votes. Many professional authors would add a special page at the end of each chapter to request monthly votes.

Signed works were eligible to receive manuscript fees from U17. If a comic was later adapted into other areas such as animation, games, or film, the author could receive additional income from those developments.

To encourage original content creation, U17 organized the Chasing Dreams, Seeking Demons comic competition, in which outstanding new comics could be selected for awards. Prizes for winning creators included cash awards, certificates, trophies, and opportunities to study tour to Japan, along with a potential signing opportunity with U17. In 2014, U17 launched the Dream Incentive Program, which introduced more award categories and distributed over 1 million RMB in rewards annually.

U17 implemented an SA-tier comic classification system. Works with over 20,000 favorites and updated within two months were categorized as S-tier, while those with over 5,000 favorites and similarly updated were categorized as A-tier. These comics would be promoted on the homepage in a designated SA-tier section. Unauthorized works were not displayed in this section.

=== VIP Service ===
Some comics on U17 adopted a VIP chapter system. The latest chapters were "sealed" and marked with a red "V" symbol, making them inaccessible to regular users. (Note: The latest chapters will be censored with mosaics. Besides subscribing to VIP, users can also recommend comics to others to earn “Seal Breaker Stones” (破印石), which can be used to unlock reading access.) However, VIP users could read these newest chapters without any restrictions.

Monthly tickets were a privilege exclusive to VIP members. Each VIP user received 13–15 monthly tickets per month (equivalent to 6.5–7.5 RMB) (Note: A U17 VIP membership costs 1,000 U17 Coins per month (equivalent to 10 RMB). The annual VIP membership is offered at a 25% discount, which brings the monthly cost down to 7.5 RMB.). Users could vote for their favorite comics with these tickets. For each monthly ticket received, the comic creator earned 0.5 RMB, with a minimum guaranteed income of 100 RMB. Each user could vote up to 3 tickets (1.5 RMB) for the same comic per month. If a user wanted to give more tickets to a creator, they could use additional U17 Coins to do so (Note: U17 Coins are the platform's virtual currency, obtained through RMB top-ups at a rate of 1 RMB = 100 U17 Coins. Readers can spend 1,666 U17 Coins (equivalent to 16.66 RMB) to give an author 3 additional monthly tickets (worth 1.5 RMB) and 3 comic recommendations.). Other VIP privileges included: modifying nicknames, increasing the upper limit of attention and bookshelf, personal identification (personal complaints, avatars, etc.), reading comics without ads, adding comic reading mode, paid chapter discounts, etc.

=== Expansion into animation, gaming, and film ===
In 2014, U17 launched its mobile gaming business. By the end of the same year, the platform began venturing into animation and film production. U17 produced web animations and generated revenue by embedding advertisements within the animations.

At the beginning of 2015, U17 collaborated with other companies to release the film One Hundred Thousand Bad Jokes (十万个冷笑话), which earned 119 million RMB at the box office during the New Year's holiday season. The animation adaptation of U17’s comic School Shock (雏蜂) was produced in Japan.

At the 7th China International Film, Television and Animation Copyright Protection and Trade Expo, Alpha Animation announced a partnership with U17 and other major companies to launch the "U Project" for Chinese animation — aiming to develop 20 films, 15 TV series, 15 web series, and 50 games over the next three years. This included works such as Die Now (端脑), Rakshasa Street(镇魂街), and School Shock (雏蜂).

== See also ==
- Tencent Animation and Comics
- Shueisha
- Bilibili
