= Rakshasa Street =

Chinese manhua series

《镇魂街》 Zhen Hun Jie
- Genre: Fantasy, action, adventure
- Author: Xu Chen
- Publisher: Jilin Fine Arts Publishing House、Ying Culture & Communications
- Other publishers: U17 Comics、Bilibili
- Magazine: HI!Manhua
- Original run: February 3 2010
- Collected volumes: 4

Rakshasa Street (Chinese: 镇魂街) is a fantasy action manhua created by Xu Chen and serialized on the U17 Comics. The serialization began in 2010.

== Plot ==
Zhenhun Street is an intermediary region between the living world and the spirit world. Each Zhenhun Street is guarded by a "Spirit General" whose duty is to protect the human world from malicious spirits and manage these entities. The protagonist Cao Yanbing is the Spirit General of Rakshasa Street, who disguises himself as a delivery guy in daily life but can actually summon Three kingdoms era generals as his Guardian Spirits in battle.

The story begins when an ordinary girl Xia Ling accidentally stumbles into Rakshasa Street. She becomes unwittingly entangled in a conspiracy and discovers the tragic past of Cao Yanbing and his younger brother Cao Xuanliang - their parents disappeared, and Xuanliang died protecting his brother, later becoming a spirit. Together, they fight against the mysterious "Kingdom Organization" to protect Rakshasa Street's sacred tree.

== Adaptations ==
=== Animation ===
- The Donghua was produced by L² Studio in 2015. The series was watched 550 million times on Bilibili.

=== Live-action ===
- A live-action web series premiered on Youku on August 2, 2017, starring Jiro Wang and An Yuexi.

== Reception ==
In a negative review, Dai Taojiang of The Paper wrote that L² Studio's Rakshasa Street "fails to demonstrate a coherent grasp of any particular cultural framework", "the plot remains flat and lacks any real spark", and the villains have "clunky movements". Sichuan Online's Zheng Zihao said the series had a "distinct, high-octane style". At the 13th China Animation and Comic Competition Golden Dragon Award, it received the Silver Award for Best Animated Series.
