= White Dragon Horse =

Character in the novel Journey to the West

- Journey to the West character
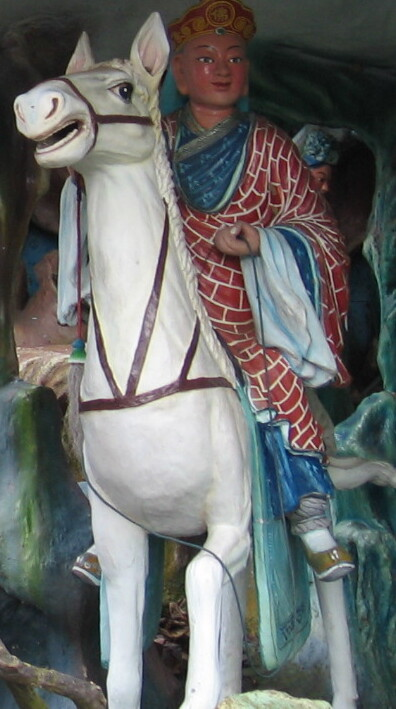
- White Dragon Horse Statue at Haw Par Villa, Singapore
- First appearance: Journey to the West

In-universe information
- Species: Chinese dragon
- Gender: Male
- Family: Dragon King of the West Sea (father); Dragon Queen of the West Sea (mother); Ao Moang (brother); Dragon King of the East Sea (uncle); Ao Bing (cousin); Other members of the Ao clan (relatives)
- Role: Steed of Tang Sanzang

The White Dragon Horse, known in Chinese as Bai Longma (Chinese: 白龍馬; pinyin: Bái Lóng Mǎ; Wade–Giles: Pai² Lung²-ma¹; lit. 'White Dragon Horse') and Yulong (Chinese: 玉龍; pinyin: Yù Lóng; Wade–Giles: Yü⁴ Lung²; lit. 'Jade Dragon'), is a major character in the 16th-century Chinese novel Journey to the West. He serves as Tang Sanzang's steed during the pilgrimage and is later ordained as Babu Tianlong Guangli Bodhisattva (Chinese: 八部天龍廣力菩薩; pinyin: Bābù Tiānlóng Guǎnglì Púsà; Wade–Giles: Pa¹-pu⁴ T'ien¹-lung² Kuang³-li⁴ P'u²-sa⁴; lit. 'Celestial Dragon Extensive-strength Bodhisattva of the Eight Legions') at the end of the novel.

== Journey to the West ==
In Journey to the West, Bai Longma is a dragon prince and the third son of the Dragon King of the West Sea. He once accidentally set fire to a pearl that had been given as a gift by the Jade Emperor. For this offense, he was sentenced to death, but Guanyin intervened and pleaded for his life. The dragon prince was spared and banished to Yingchou Stream (鷹愁澗) in Shepan Mountain (蛇盤山), where he was instructed to wait for the monk whom Guanyin would send on a pilgrimage to the Buddha.

When Tang Sanzang crosses the stream, the prince appears as a gigantic white dragon and swallows Tang's white horse. He fights Sun Wukong but is defeated and retreats underwater. Sun Wukong later learns from a local earth deity that the dragon had been placed there by Guanyin. He then seeks out Guanyin and learns the dragon's origin. The dragon prince had been waiting for Tang Sanzang, but failed to recognize him and ate his horse. He is then transformed into the White Dragon Horse and serves as Tang Sanzang's steed for the rest of the journey. Compared with some of the other pilgrims, he is often depicted as quiet and intelligent, and he occasionally returns to dragon form to fight when the group is in danger.

When Tang Sanzang is captured by the Yellow Robe Demon, the White Dragon Horse transforms into a palace maid and attempts to rescue him, but fails. He escapes and informs Zhu Bajie, who then brings back Sun Wukong to save Tang Sanzang. At the end of the novel, the White Dragon Horse is ordained as the Great Strength Bodhisattva of the Eight Heavenly Sections (八部天龙广力菩萨) and the Dragon Horse of the Eight Heavenly Sections (八部天龍馬). He resumes his white dragon form and coils around one of the pillars in the Great Leiyin Temple.

== Scholarly interpretations ==
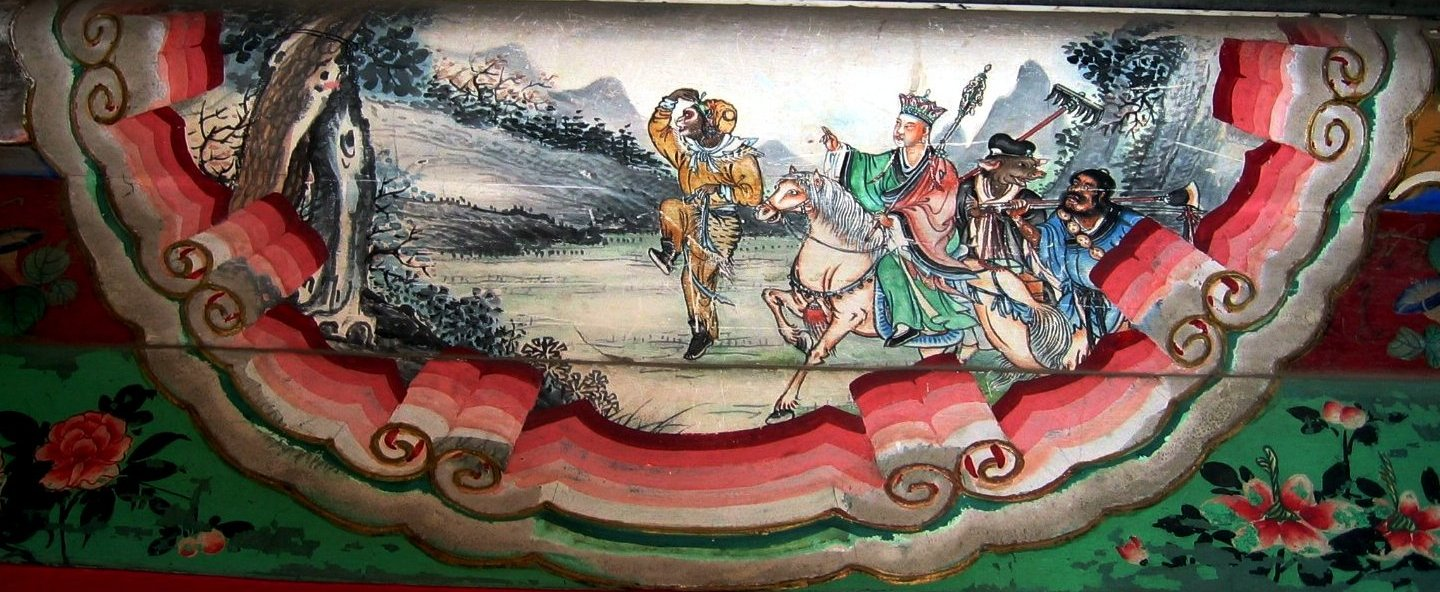
The four heroes of Journey to the West, Tang Sanzang on the second from the left, riding on the White Dragon Horse. Painted decoration in the Long Corridor at the Summer Palace in Beijing, China

In traditional Chinese literary criticism and Neidan interpretations of the novel, the White Dragon Horse is associated with the concept of the "Horse of the Mind" or "Horse of the Will" (意马, yima). According to an analysis by Nankai University professor Chen Hong (陈洪) and classical literature editor Gao Hongzhou (高宏洲), this symbolic framework works together with Sun Wukong, who represents the "Monkey of the Mind" (心猿, xinyuan). Together, the two characters correspond to the classical Chinese Buddhist and Daoist idiom "Mind Monkey and Horse of the Will" (心猿意马), which describes restless and wandering thoughts.

In the novel's chapter titles and poetry, the subduing of the White Dragon Horse is described as "reining in the horse of the mind" (意马收缰). Chinese researcher Jiu Zhiwei (九之尾) interprets the character's transformation into a horse that carries Tang Sanzang as symbolizing the taming and harnessing of wandering willpower, a necessary step in the pilgrimage's spiritual journey.

The White Dragon Horse's appearance and origins have also been interpreted in relation to ancient Chinese cosmological ideas, especially the Five Elements (五行) and the theory of the Five Directions and Five Colors (五方五色论). In traditional Chinese cosmology, the west is associated with the color white. Under this interpretation, when Wu Cheng'en adapted earlier Yuan dynasty versions of the dragon character, originally a "Fire Dragon" from the south, into the son of the Dragon King of the West Sea (西海龙王), the character's identity as a white or jade dragon became consistent with the color symbolism of the western direction.

The White Dragon Horse's literary origins have also been traced to the historical journey of the 7th-century Buddhist monk Xuanzang. Historical records, including the Biography of the Tripitaka Master of the Great Ci'en Temple of the Great Tang Dynasty (大唐大慈恩寺三藏法师传), describe Xuanzang traveling across the desert on a "lean old red horse" (瘦老赤马) given to him by an elderly man in the Western Regions. When Xuanzang was stranded in the Gobi Desert without water for several days, the horse found an oasis, allowing him to survive and continue westward. Jiu identifies this red horse as a historical prototype for the later Fire Dragon and Jade Dragon traditions that developed into the White Dragon Horse of Journey to the West.

== Worship ==
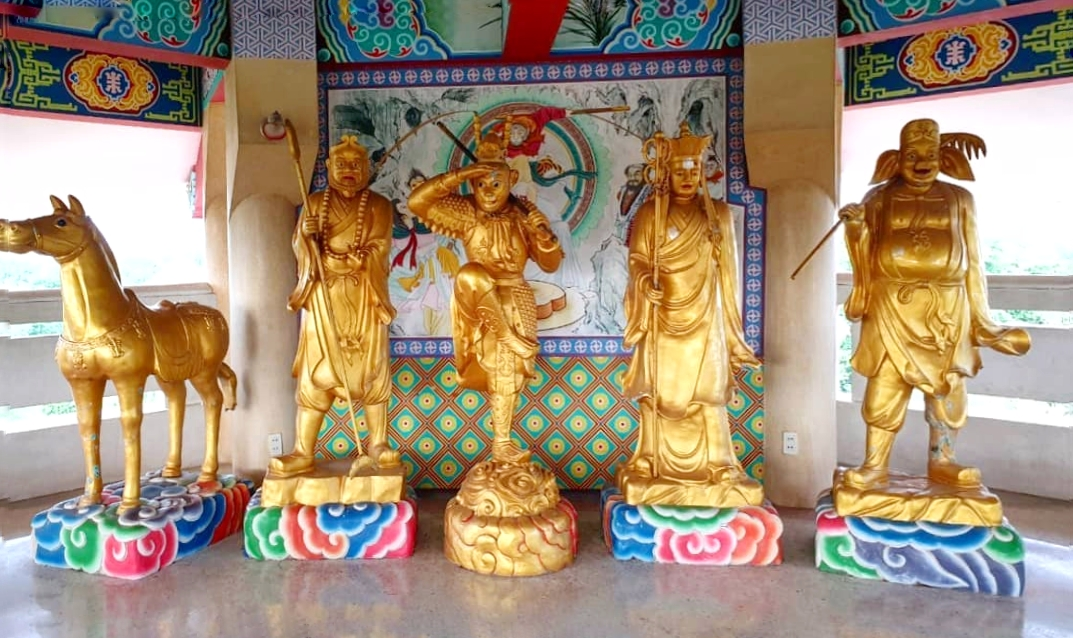
Statues of the White Dragon Horse, Sha Wujing, Sun Wukong, Tang Sanzang, and Zhu Bajie at the Rua Yai City Pillar Shrine

Bai Longma is worshipped as a deity in Chinese folk religion. Located in Rua Yai, Mueang Suphan Buri District, Suphan Buri, Thailand, the City Pillar Shrine (ศาลเจ้าพ่อหลักเมืองสุพรรณบุรี) enshrines the golden statue of Bai Longma, along with Tang Sanzang, Sun Wukong, Zhu Bajie, and Sha Wujing.

== Adaptations of Journey to the West ==
- In episode 5 of the 1986 television series, the White Dragon Horse was getting married when his fiancée, the Wansheng Princess, was cheating on him. He got so angry that he burned the pearl given to him as a gift by the Jade Emperor and was banished to Yingchou Stream as punishment. Sometime after being punished, the White Dragon Horse ate Tang Sanzang's horse when the horse ran off. When Sun Wukong saw that the horse was missing, he fought the dragon prince demanding his master's horse back. After fighting with the prince, Wukong went to the Dragon King's palace to discuss the dragon he had fought. When Guanyin appeared, Sun Wukong told her about the dragon that ate his master's horse. Guanyin called the prince out and instructed him to be Tang Sanzang's steed for the rest of the journey.
- When in episode 18 of 1986 television series, the White Dragon Horse realized that he was poisoned, he immediately returned to his human form and went to Emerald Waves Lake to assist Sun Wukong and Zhu Bajie to retrieve the stolen Sariputra. While doing so, he was confronted by Wansheng Princess when she offered him the stolen Sariputra and reconciliation of their relationship. He then accepts and asked her for the Sariputra. When she revealed it to him, he immediately snatched it from her and left Emerald Waves Lake with Sun Wukong and Zhu Bajie who then returned the Satriputra.
- In the anime and manga Saiyuki, the character of Jeep is loosely based on the White Dragon Horse. He is a small shapeshifting dragon that transforms into the Sanzo party's mode of transportation on their journey: a Jeep (hence the name). He is Hakkai's pet and can breathe fire. In his past life, instead of being a son of the Dragon King of the West (Sea), he was the Dragon King himself, named Goujun. He was also a commanding officer of Heaven's army and Kenren Taisho's immediate superior.
- In Monkey Magic, the White Dragon Horse is a female instead and she goes by the name Runlay.
- In the Kemono Friends 3 app, White Dragon Horse appears as a playable character.
- In the 2000 television series Journey to the West Afterstory, the character is given the personal name Ao Lie (Chinese: 敖烈; pinyin: Áo Liè), a name subsequently adopted in other modern adaptations such as Non-Human and Lego Monkie Kid.

== See also ==
- Longma
- List of media adaptations of Journey to the West
- Will Horse
