= Xiaotian Quan =

Chinese mythological creature

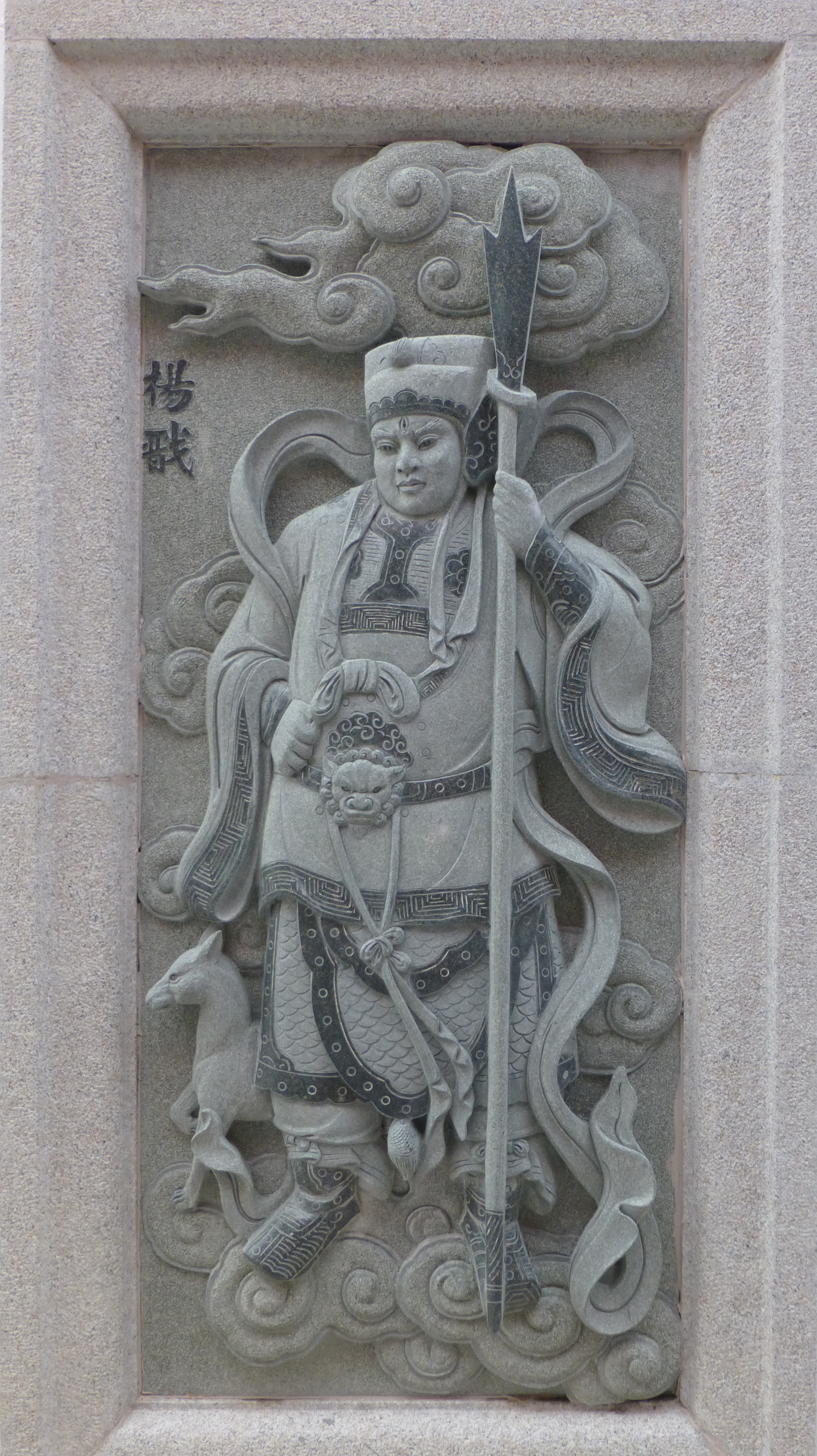
- Relief of Erlang Shen and Xiaotian Quan.

Creature information
- Other name(s): Xiàotiān Quǎn, 哮天犬, or 嘯天犬

Origin
- First attested: In Search of the Supernatural
- Known for: attacking demons, protecting pet health
- Country: China

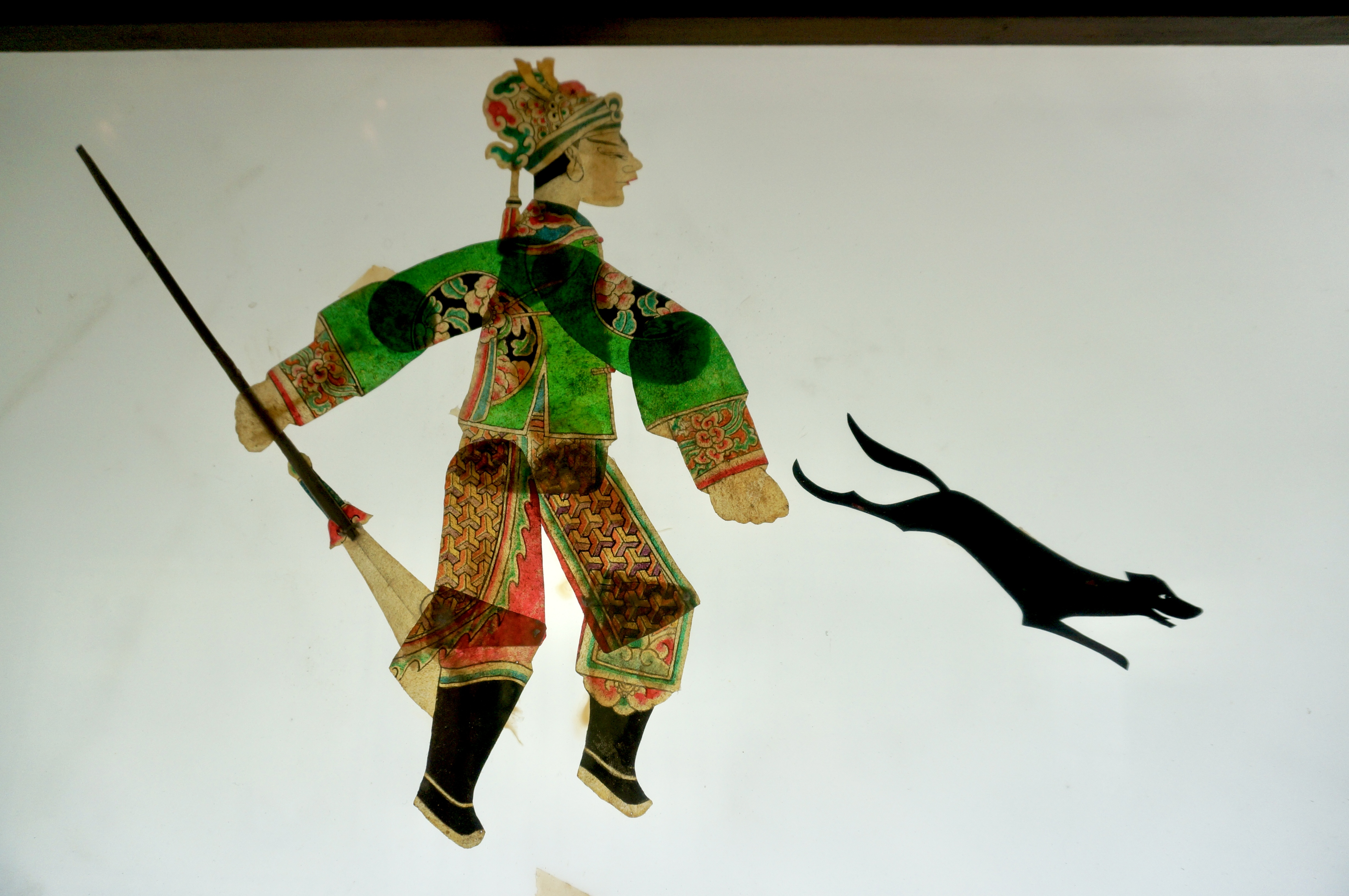
A shadow puppet depicting Xiaotian Quan and his lord Erlang Shen.

Xiaotian Quan (Chinese: 哮天犬 or 嘯天犬; pinyin: Xiàotiān Quǎn; lit. 'Howling/Barking Celestial Dog') is a Chinese mythological beast and companion of the Chinese god Erlang Shen. Depicted as a black dog, it assists Erlang Shen in battle by using its powerful bite and howl to attack, maul, or subdue demons. Xiaotian Quan appears in Journey to the West, Fengshen Yanyi, and other legends about Erlang Shen, such as Lotus Lantern and several Chinese folktales.

== Origin ==
Many identify Xiaotian Quan with the mythological Tiangou. Consequently, the cultural idiom describing a solar eclipse as the 'heavenly dog eating the sun' is often interpreted as an allusion to Xiaotian Quan.

The dog is also identified with the hunting hound of the legendary archer Hou Yi.

Some claims connect the Tibetan Mastiff to Xiaotian Quan, while other scholars believe that Xiaotian Quan belongs to the Chinese Xigou (slender dog) breed. According to Chinese historian Zhang Zhenglang's research, the prototype of Xiaotian Quan is the divine rat who assisted Dujian, the second son of the Northern Heavenly King Vaishravana. Dujian is identified with Erlang Shen by a later Buddhist source.

== Legends ==
Xiaotian Quan appears in many folkloric and cultural works. The dog first appeared in Gan Bao's In Search of the Supernatural. It prevents Liu Chenxiang from splitting Mount Hua to rescue his mother Huayue Sanniang in the Chinese folktale of Lotus Lantern. Yang Jian, assumed to be Erlang, sometimes sends his dog to bite his enemies in the novel Investiture of the Gods. In the novel Journey to the West, Xiaotian Quan helps fight Sun Wukong and later the Nine-Headed Prince Consort (九頭駙馬). Xiaotian Quan features in legends about lunar and solar eclipses.

In one version of the legend, after Hou Yi’s wife Chang'e stole his elixir of immortality and fled to the moon, the loyal dog chased after her and swallowed the moon in an attempt to bring her back. The Queen Mother of the West, moved by the dog's devotion to its master, spared it from punishment and granted it the title of "Tiangou", appointing it as guardian of the Southern Heavenly Gate. The dog later released the moon and eventually entered the service of the deity Erlang Shen, where it became known as Xiaotian Quan.

According to one legend, Xiaotian Quan was once a woman whose extreme wickedness led the Jade Emperor to transform her into a dog and imprison her in the depths of hell. Her devoted son later attained immortality in order to break into the underworld and rescue her. After her release, she sought revenge against heaven and attempted to swallow the sun and the moon, plunging the world into darkness. This story is commonly cited as the origin of the custom of beating gongs and drums during solar and lunar eclipses.

He is also a character featured in Peking Opera.

== Worship ==
Many temples dedicated to Erlang Shen to also enshrine Xiaotian Quan and in modern times it is suggested that people with sick pets pray to it. In a temple in Malaysia, the statue of Xiaotian Quan closely resembles that of a German Shepherd, which caused people to make jokes.

The Yang Qiaotou Hall Temple in Haichang, Penang Island, is the only temple dedicated to Xiaotian Quan as a main deity.

The Yingyuan Temple in Taiwan enshrines a statue of Xiaotian Quan under the title "General Tiangu".

== In popular culture ==
The Song and Jin dynasties coins depict Xiaotian Quana, alongside his lord Erlang Shen.

=== Proverb ===
Xiaotian Quan is the origin of a Chinese proverb called "狗咬呂洞賓——不識好人心" ("A dog bites Lü Dongbin—to fail to see the heart of a good person; to bite the hand that feeds you"). Loyalty to a master's vendetta is central to this tale. Despite Lü Dongbin intervening to rescue Xiaotian Quan from a dog meat vendor in the mortal world, the animal refused to show gratitude. The dog's aggression toward Lü was rooted in a previous argument between the Immortal and the dog's master, Erlang Shen. Consequently, the hound bit his savior, prioritizing past animosity over present safety.

=== Film and TV series ===
- Portrayed by Chen Chuang in 2009 Chinese series Prelude of Lotus Lantern
