= Xigou =

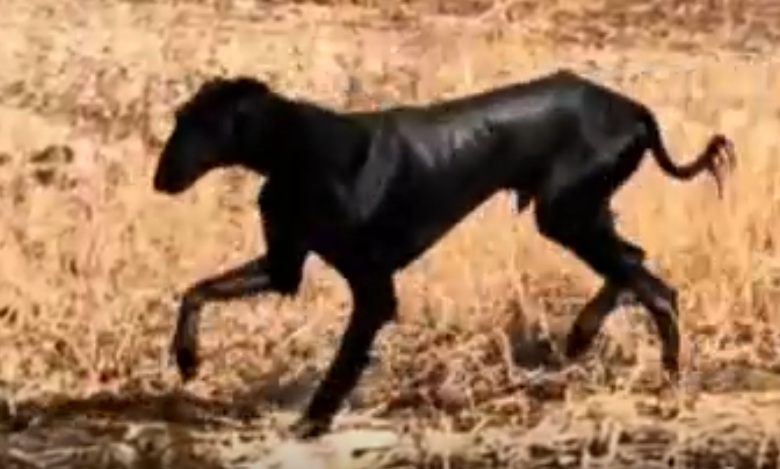
- A black Xigou
- Other names: Xiquan (細犬); Xiliegou (細獵狗); Xiǎn (獫) liegou(獵狗); Qinxian(秦獫); Chinese Hound (中國獵犬); Chinese thin dog (中華細犬); Chinese Xiquan (中國細犬); Chinese Xilagou (中華細蠟狗); Chinese Xigou (中國細狗); Chinese Saluk (中國薩路基); Chinese Greyhound (中國格力犬); Qidan Hound (契丹獵犬); Kangxi Xiquan (康熙細犬); Kangxi Xigou (康熙細狗); Kangxi Imperial Dog (康熙御犬); Huang (黃); Tiaoquan(跳犬); Tiaogou(跳狗); Kuaiquan(快犬); Kuaigou(快狗); Xianliequan(咸獵犬); Fanzi(幡子); Huatiao(滑条); Shǎnxī Hound(陝西獵犬); China Santung Slender Dog; China Canines; Xi Dog; Xila Dog; Tiao Dog; Kuai Dog; Xianlie Dog
- Origin: China
Traits
- Height: 24–31 in (60–78 cm)
- Weight: 44–66 lb (20–30 kg)
- Coat: Short-haired and long-haired, etc.
- Color: White, cream, buff, ocher, caesious, black, blood red, blue-gray, etc.
Kennel club standards
- China Kennel Union: standard

The Xigou (Chinese: 細狗, literally: narrow dog), also known as Xiquan (Chinese: 細犬), Xiliegou (Chinese: 細獵狗), Chinese Hound (Chinese: 中國獵犬), Kuaiquan (Chinese: 快犬), and Chinese Xiquan (Chinese: 中國細犬), is a rare breed of sighthound native to China.

== Background ==
The Xigou is an ancient indigenous dog breed from China, with evidence suggesting it has existed for over 2,500 years. Historically, the Xigou has been highly regarded by both nobility and commoners throughout various Chinese dynasties. Representations of the breed can be found in numerous Chinese tombs and cultural relics.

While some cynologists speculate the Xigou is the principal ancestor of all sighthounds known today, others indicate modern stock may have been intermixed in more recent years, pointing to greyhounds shipped to China by the East India Company. Once used to chase and capture prey on the open, flat land of the Huangtu Plateau, the breed is now in trouble, its numbers plummeting as a result of the government curbing the rights of its citizens to hunt. The China Kennel Union (CKU) classifies the breed as 'rare', and is trying to resurrect it. To that end, the CKU initiated an effort to collect DNA from the dogs in 2017.

== Appearance ==
The Xigou is lanky, with males being 60–78 centimetres (24–31 in) tall and females being shorter, between 65–75 centimetres (26–30 in) tall. The Xigou has a long and narrow head, a flat forehead, small spacing between ears, drooping ears, a slender neck, a slender waist, a curved back, and a long tail. It is divided into short-haired and feathered species, etc. Coat colors include yellow, black, brown, white, and fawn red.

== Variety ==
The existing Xigou varieties mainly include Shaanxi Xigou (Chinese: 陝西細狗), Shandong Xigou (Chinese: 山東細狗), Hebei Xigou (Chinese: 河北細狗) and Menggu Xigou (Chinese: 蒙古細狗), etc.

=== Shaanxi Xigou ===
The Shaanxi Xigou, also known as Xiǎn (Chinese: 獫) or Shǎnxī Hound (Chinese: 陝西獵犬), and Xianliequan (Chinese: 咸獵犬), is a versatile breed known for its hunting prowess, reliability as a guard dog, and loyalty as a companion. Some experts contend that the Shaanxi Xigou is the progenitor of all Xigou. This breed is characterized by a long, narrow head resembling that of a sheep. Shaanxi Xigou is mainly distributed in Weinan, Xianyang and Xi'an in the Guanzhong region of Shaanxi Province, China.

=== Shandong Xigou ===
The Shandong Xigou, also known as Tiaoquan (Chinese: 跳犬), is renowned for its exceptional sense of smell and strong hunting instincts. Historically, it served as the royal hunting dog during the Tang dynasty and continued to be favored as a hunting companion for centuries. Beyond its role in hunting, the Shandong Xigou is also highly effective in guarding livestock on farms. The breed can be found in both a long and short-haired types, the long-haired types is called Fanzi (Chinese: 幡子) by the locals, and the short-haired types is called Huatiao (Chinese: 滑条) by the locals.

=== Hebei Xigou ===
The Hebei Xigou, also known as the Kangxi Imperial Dog (Chinese: 康熙御犬), closely resembles the Greyhound in appearance. This breed was primarily used for hunting hares and is highly regarded for its loyalty, strong memory, keen sense of smell, high prey drive, and excellent endurance. The Hebei Xigou is well-suited for hunting in open plains and can also serve as an effective guard dog. It is an improved and expanded variety of the Shandong Xigou, with some scholars suggesting it emerged during the Five Dynasties and Ten Kingdoms period. During the Qing dynasty, the Hebei Xigou was selected as the royal hunting dog and was favored by the Kangxi Emperor.

=== Menggu Xigou ===
The Menggu Xigou, also known as the Qidan Hound (Chinese: 契丹獵犬), is a distinctively different hound, characterized by a stockier build and a thicker coat. This Xigou is known for its tenacity, keen sense of smell and excellent running ability. Dating back to the Liao dynasty, the Menggu Xigou was favored by northern aristocrats, who relied on it both as a hunting dog and a watchdog. Historical records suggest that Genghis Khan brought the Menggu Xigou with him during his campaigns through Europe. Experts believe the Menggu Xigou traces its origins to the Saluki. Menggu Xigou is mainly distributed in Heilongjiang, Jilin, Liaoning and the eastern part of Inner Mongolia in China. Like other Xigou, the breed is now relatively rare.

== In mythology ==
Xiaotian Quan (Chinese: 哮天犬) is a Chinese mythological beast and companion of the Chinese god Erlang Shen (Chinese: 二郎神). According to the descriptions of many mythological texts, drawings and sculptures, Xiaotian Quan is a slender, short-haired white dog. For this reason, some scholars believe that Xiaotian Quan is a white short-haired Xigou.

== Folklore Activities ==
Xigou Nian Tu (Chinese: 細狗攆兔), literally means "Xigou chasing rabbit" or "Slender dog chasing rabbit", also known as Pucheng fine dog out rabbit. This is a Chinese folk competitive activity with a long history, popular in more than 10 provinces and regions in China, including Shaanxi, Shanxi, Henan, Hubei, Hunan, Inner Mongolia, Ningxia, Gansu, etc. It is said to have originated in the area north of the Wei River from the Warring States Period to the Qin dynasty or earlier.

The event is held on specific festivals, mainly the Lantern Festival, Dragon Boat Festival, Laba Festival, etc. On the day of the festival, owners will dress their Xigou in specially made clothes or hang colorful ribbons on them, let go of the dog leashes, and let the Xigous run and chase rabbits.Dog owners would hold a tool called a "Maolian"(Chinese: 矛鐮) and swing it at the rabbit when it was chased by a Xigou, causing it to fall over. The Xigou would then bite the rabbit.

== Gallery ==
=== Han dynasty ( 202 B.C.E. — 220 C.E. ) ===
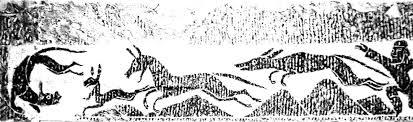
Han Rubbings of stone paintings from Nanyang tombs(Partial), From right to left (25 C.E. –220 C.E. )

=== Tang dynasty ( 618 C.E. — 907 C.E. ) ===
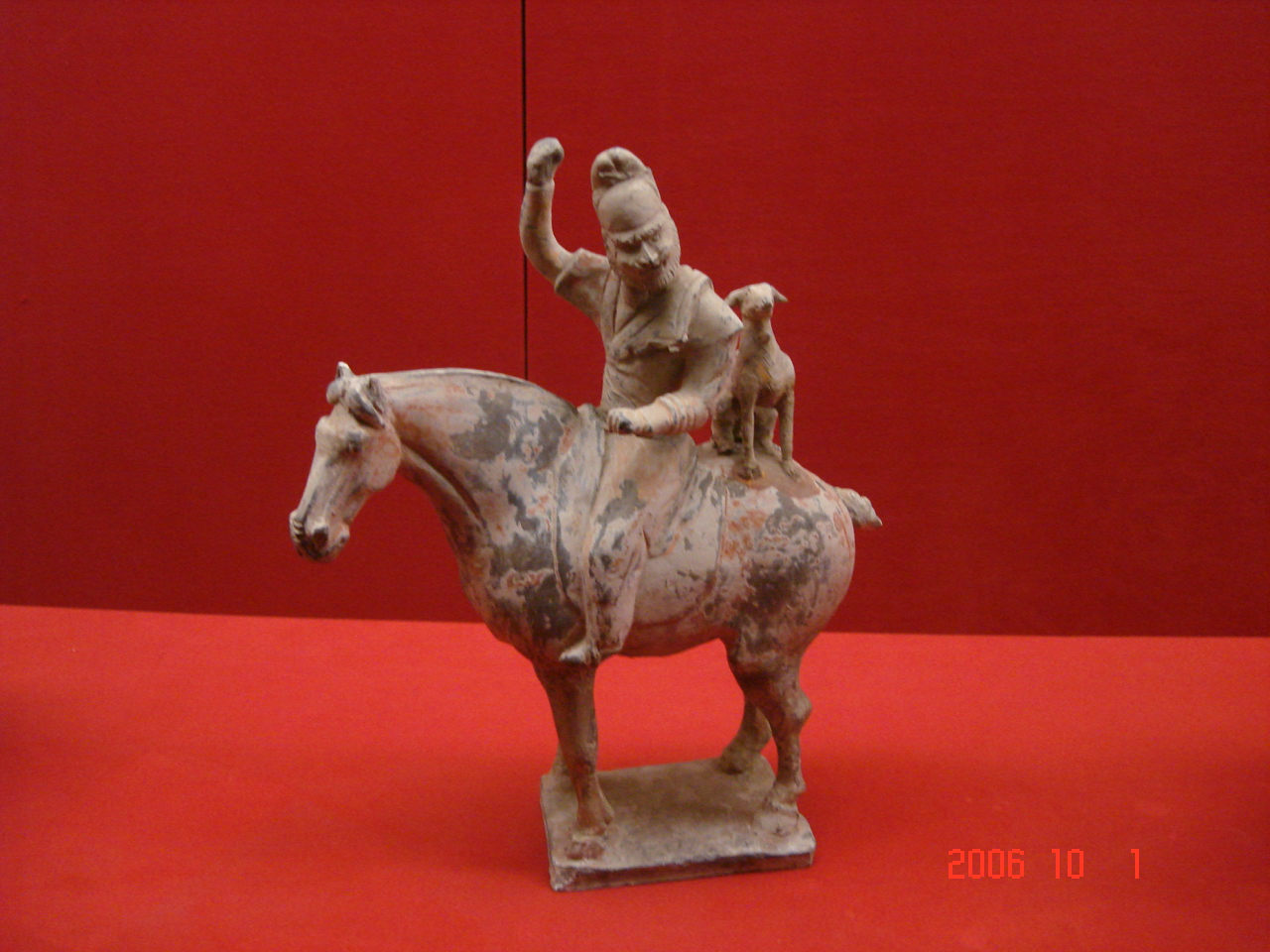
Tang Horse & Rider Pottery, On Cantle

=== Song dynasty ( 960 C.E. — 1279 C.E. ) ===
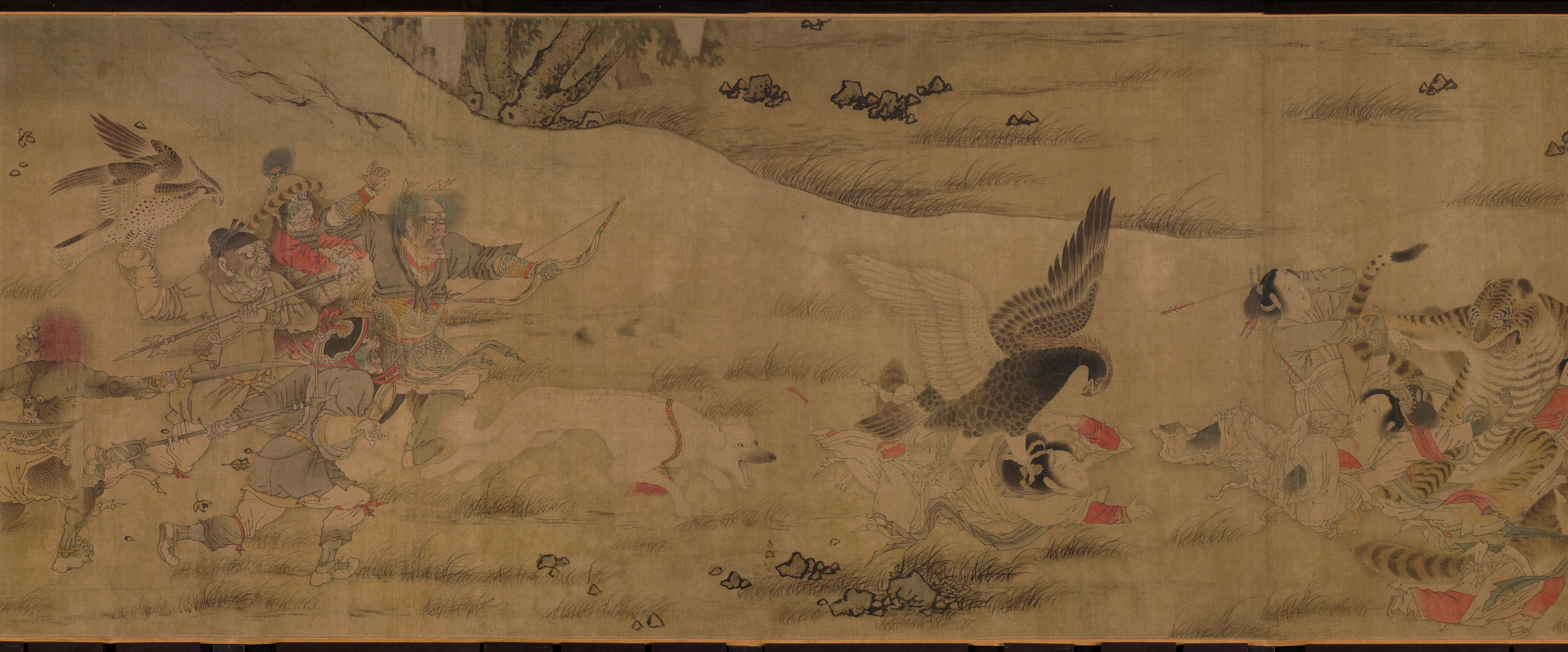
Song Search the Mountain(Partial), middle (1250 C.E.)

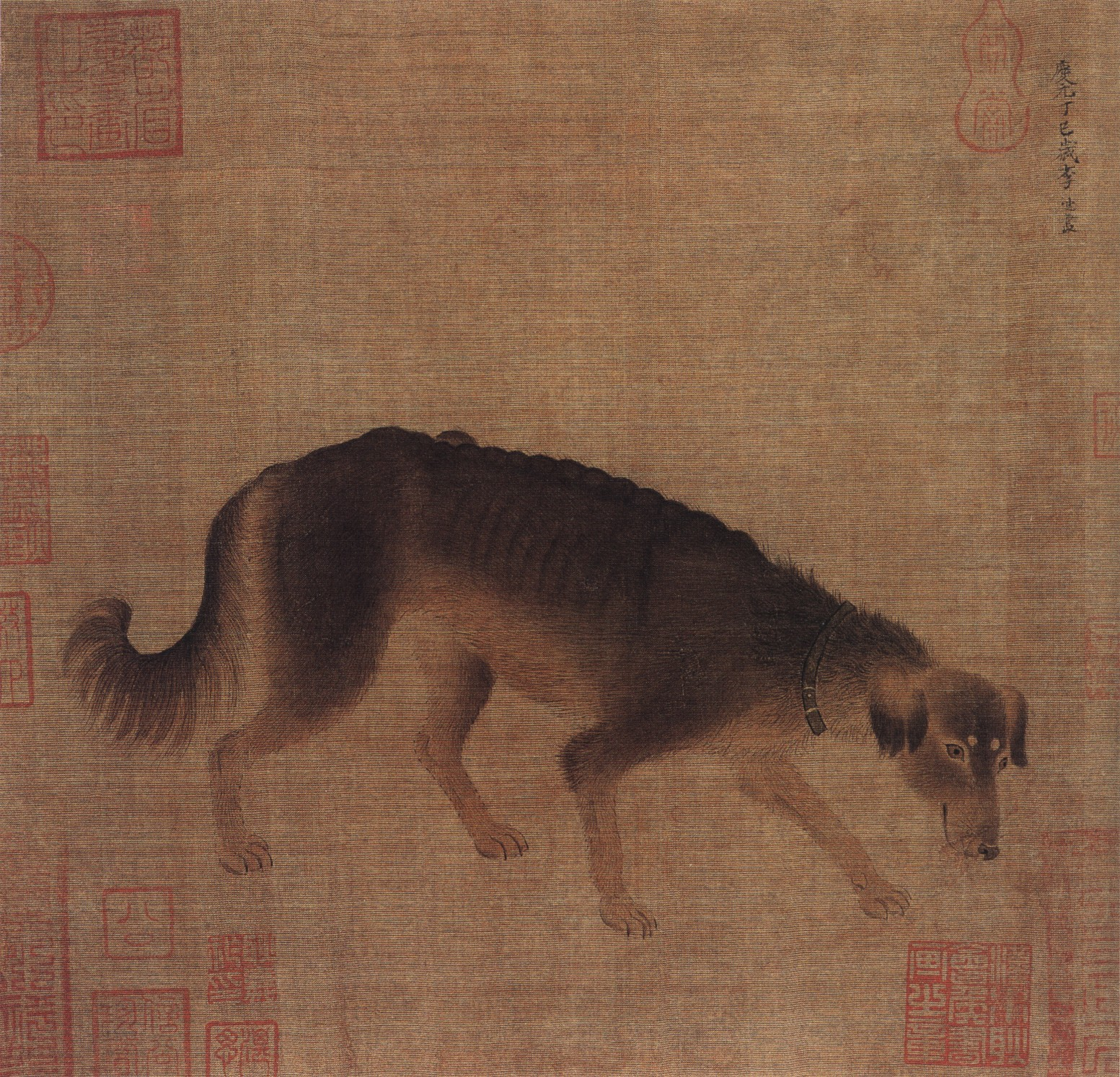
Song Hunting Dog ( 12th century )

=== Yuan dynasty ( 1260 C.E. — 1368 C.E. ) ===
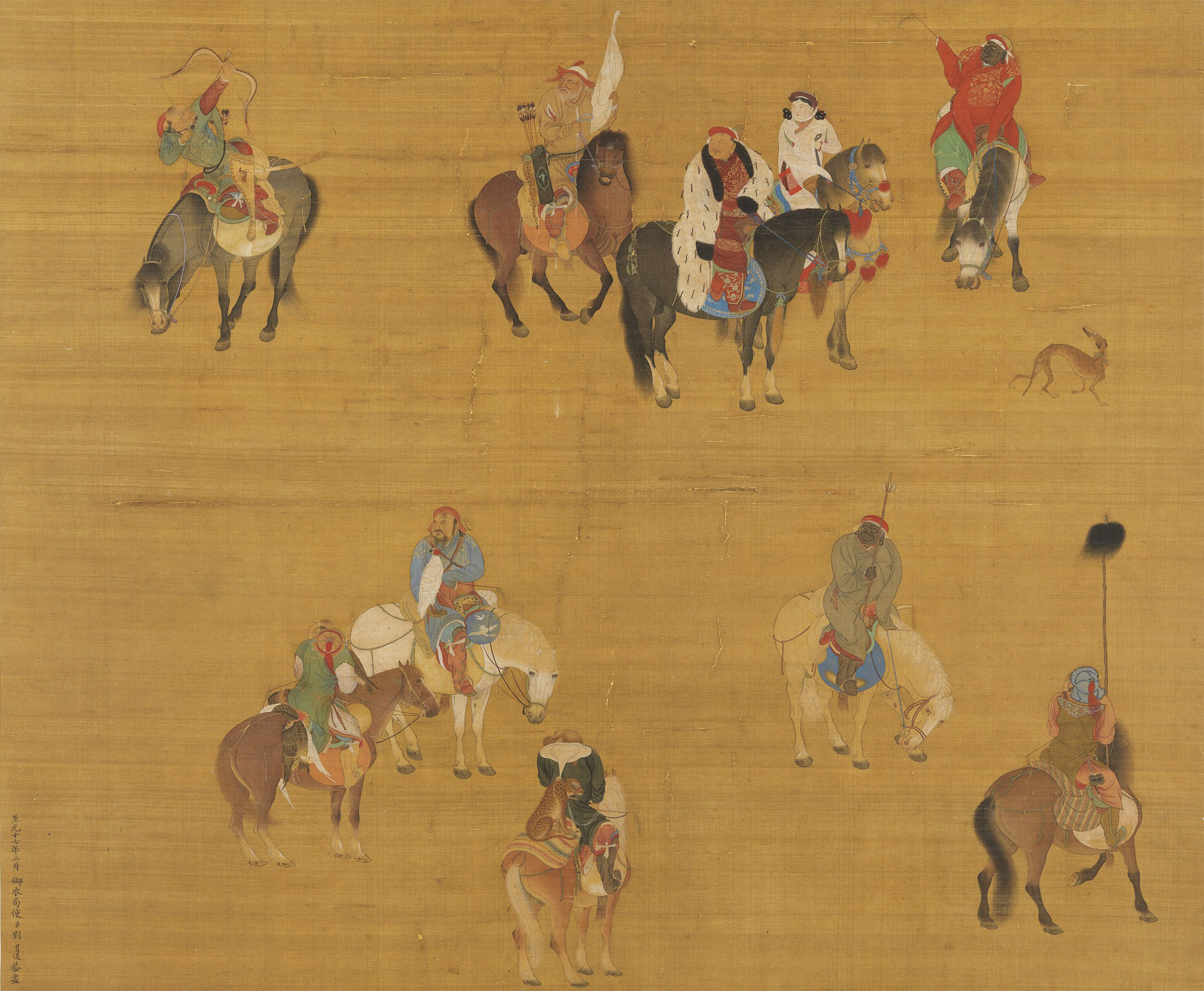
Yuan Khubilai On The Hunt(Partial), Top right (1280 C.E.)

=== Ming dynasty ( 1368 C.E. — 1644 C.E. ) ===
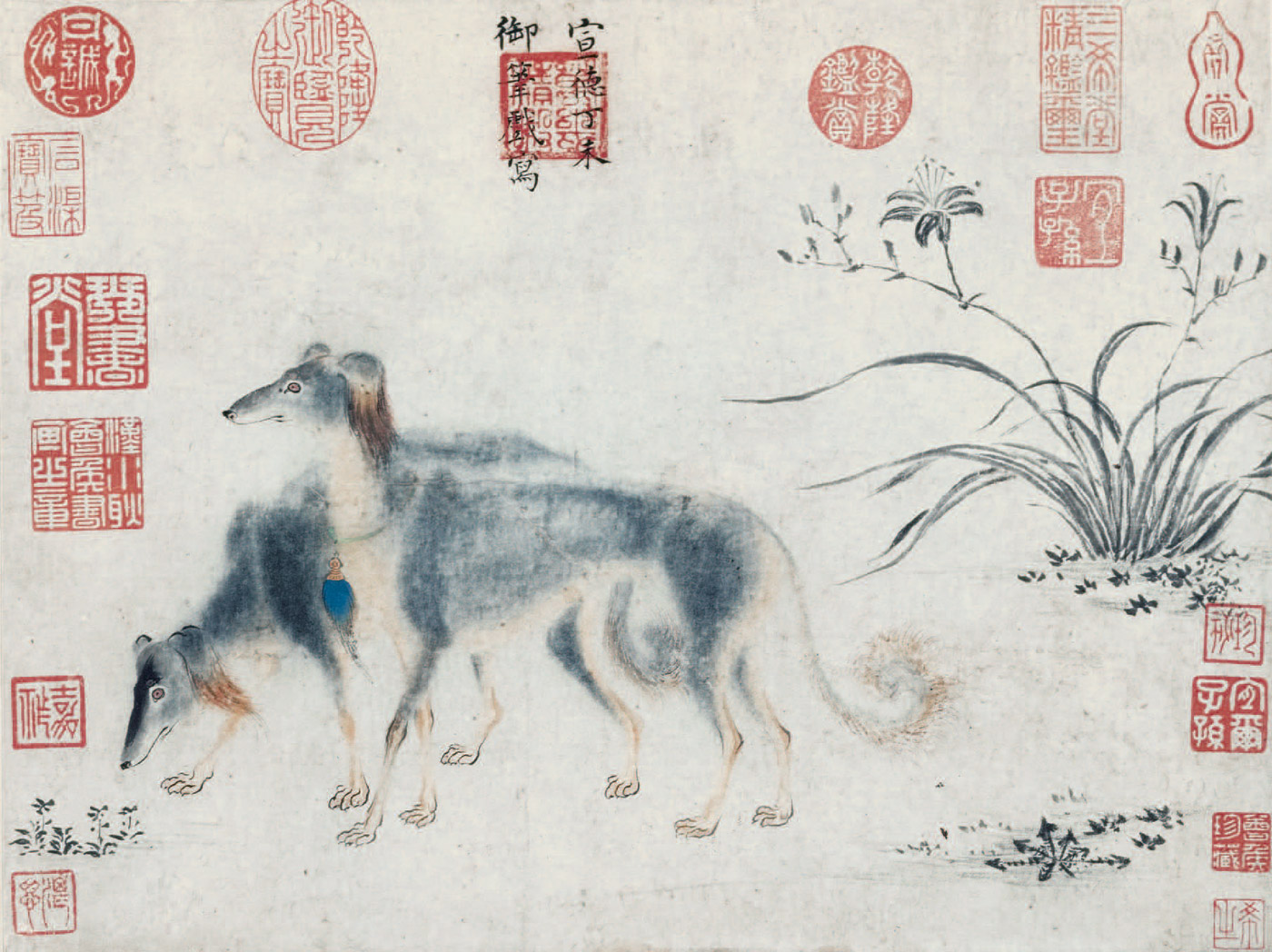
Two Xigou, painted by the Xuande Emperor of China (1399 C.E. –1435 C.E., Ming)

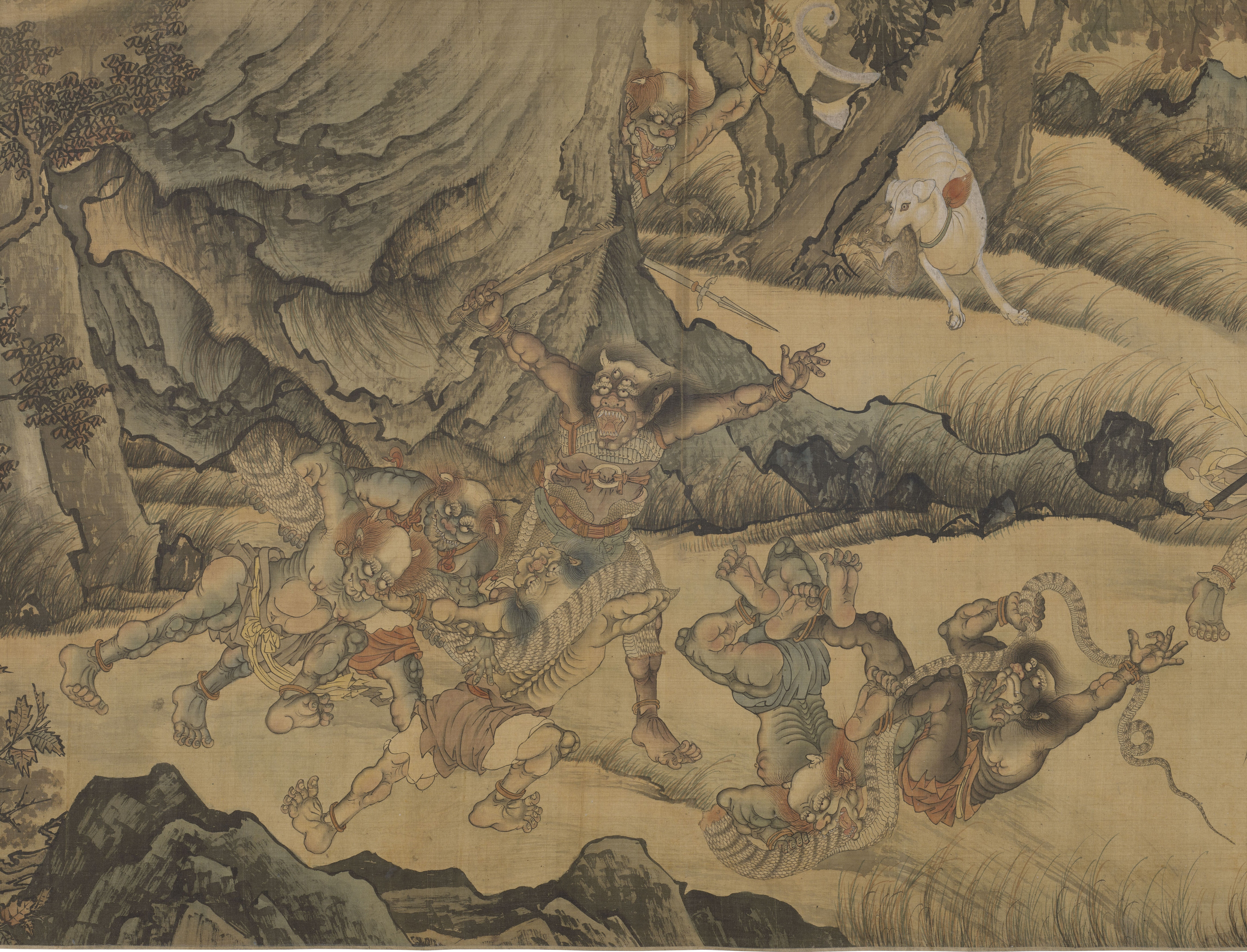
Ming Soushan Tu (Partial), Top right (1450 C.E.)

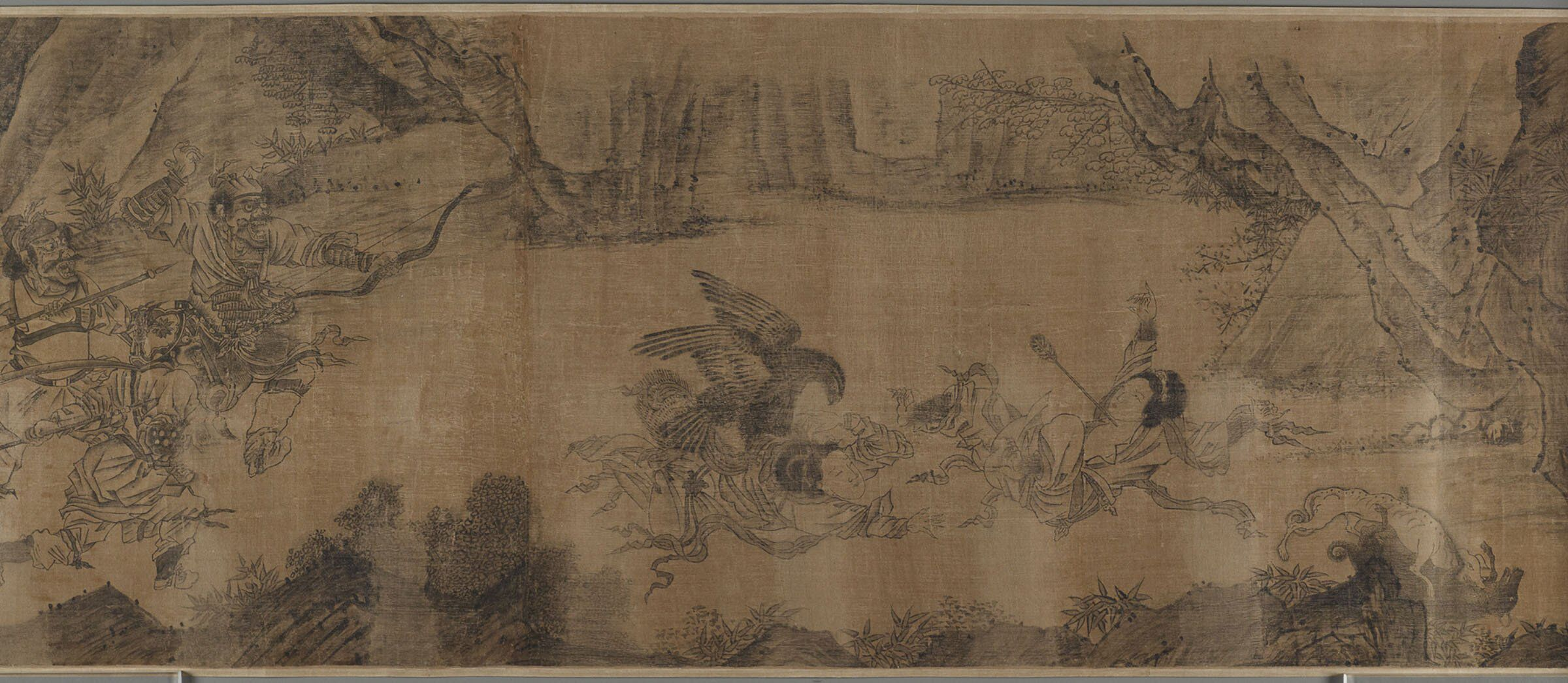
Ming Guankou Soushan Tu (Partial), Bottom right (Circa 1500 C.E.)

=== Qing dynasty ( 1644 C.E. — 1912 C.E. ) ===
==== Ten Prized Dogs ( Painted by the Lang Shining ) ====
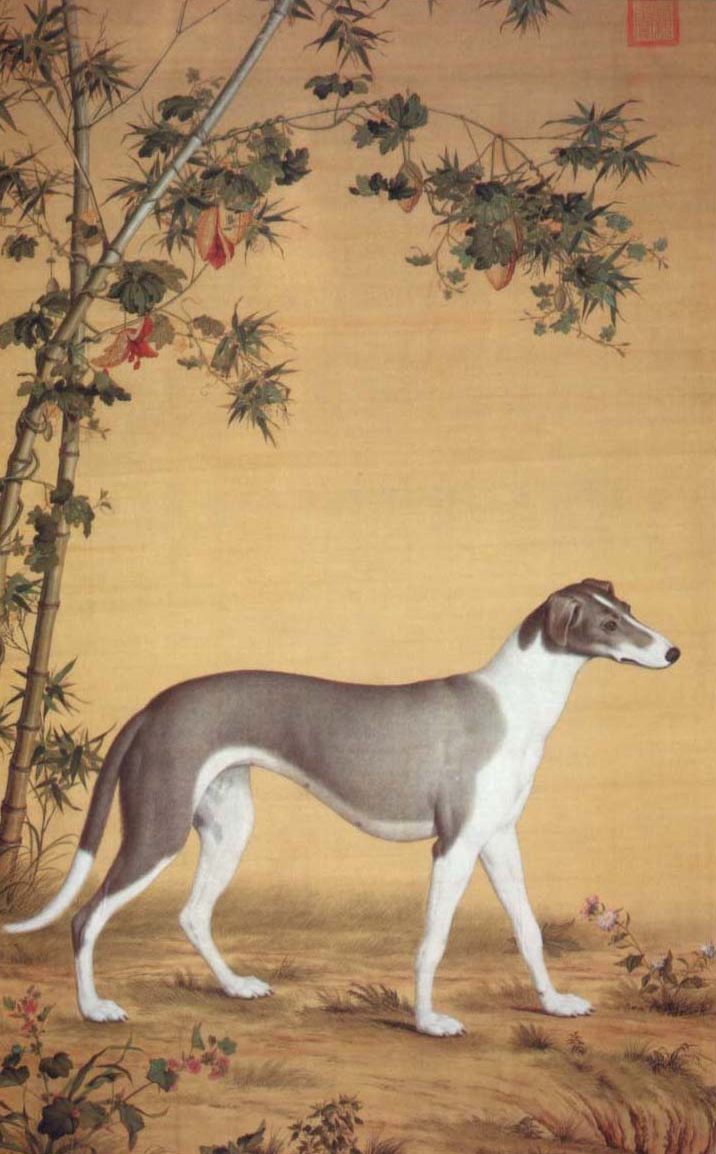
One of a series in Ten Prized Dogs, painted by the Lang Shining

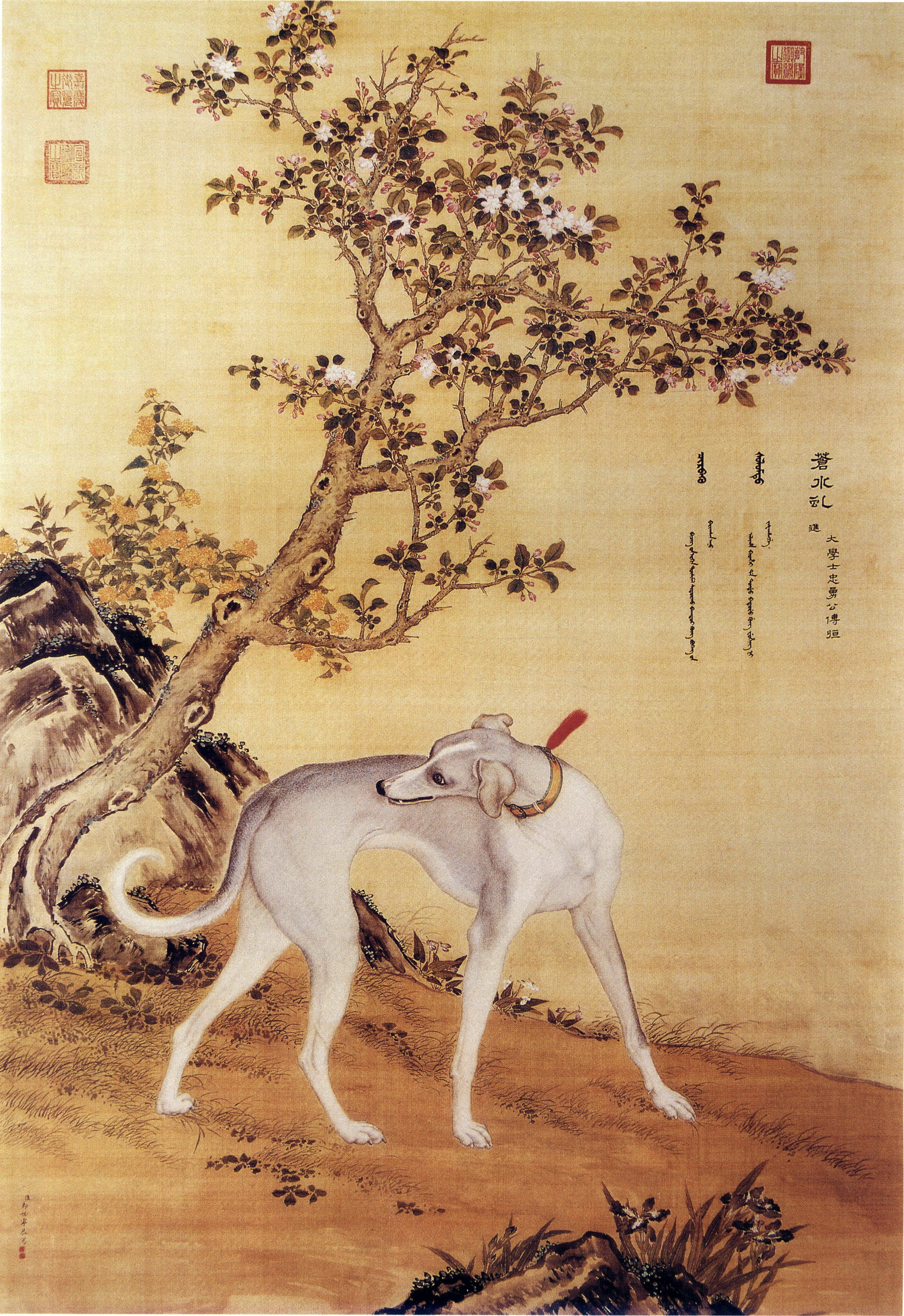
One of a series in Ten Prized Dogs, painted by the Lang Shining

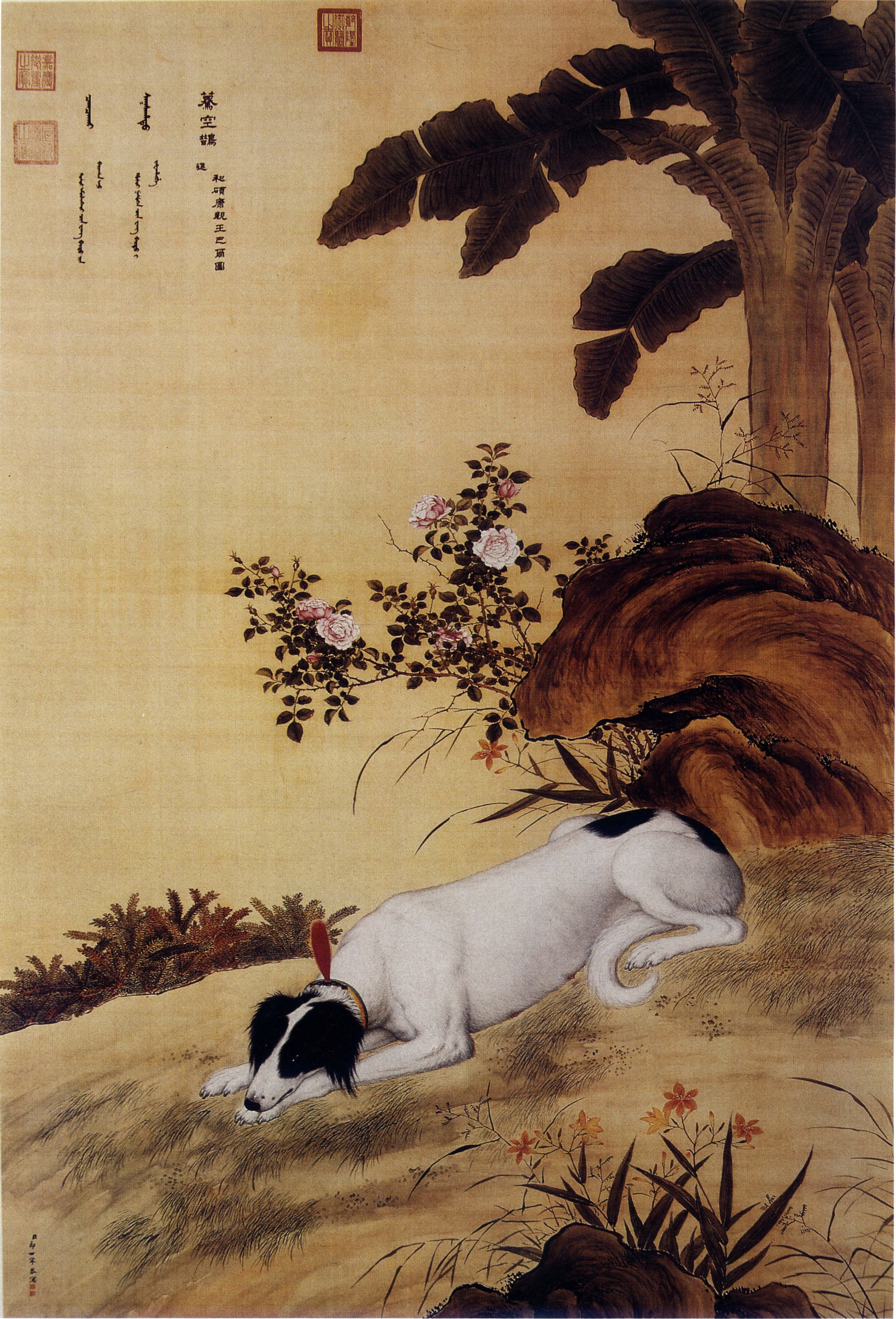
One of a series in Ten Prized Dogs, painted by the Lang Shining

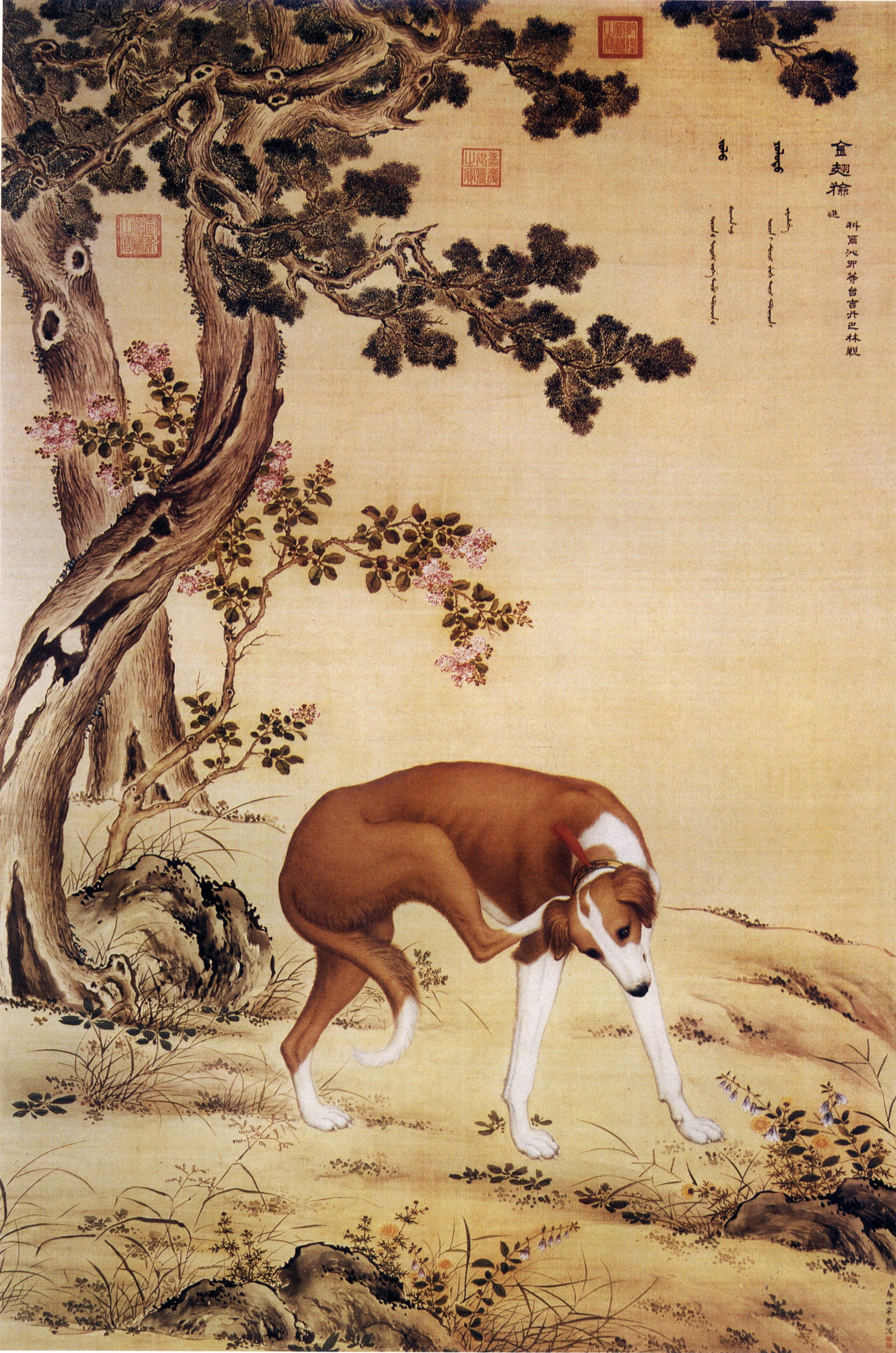
One of a series in Ten Prized Dogs, painted by the Lang Shining

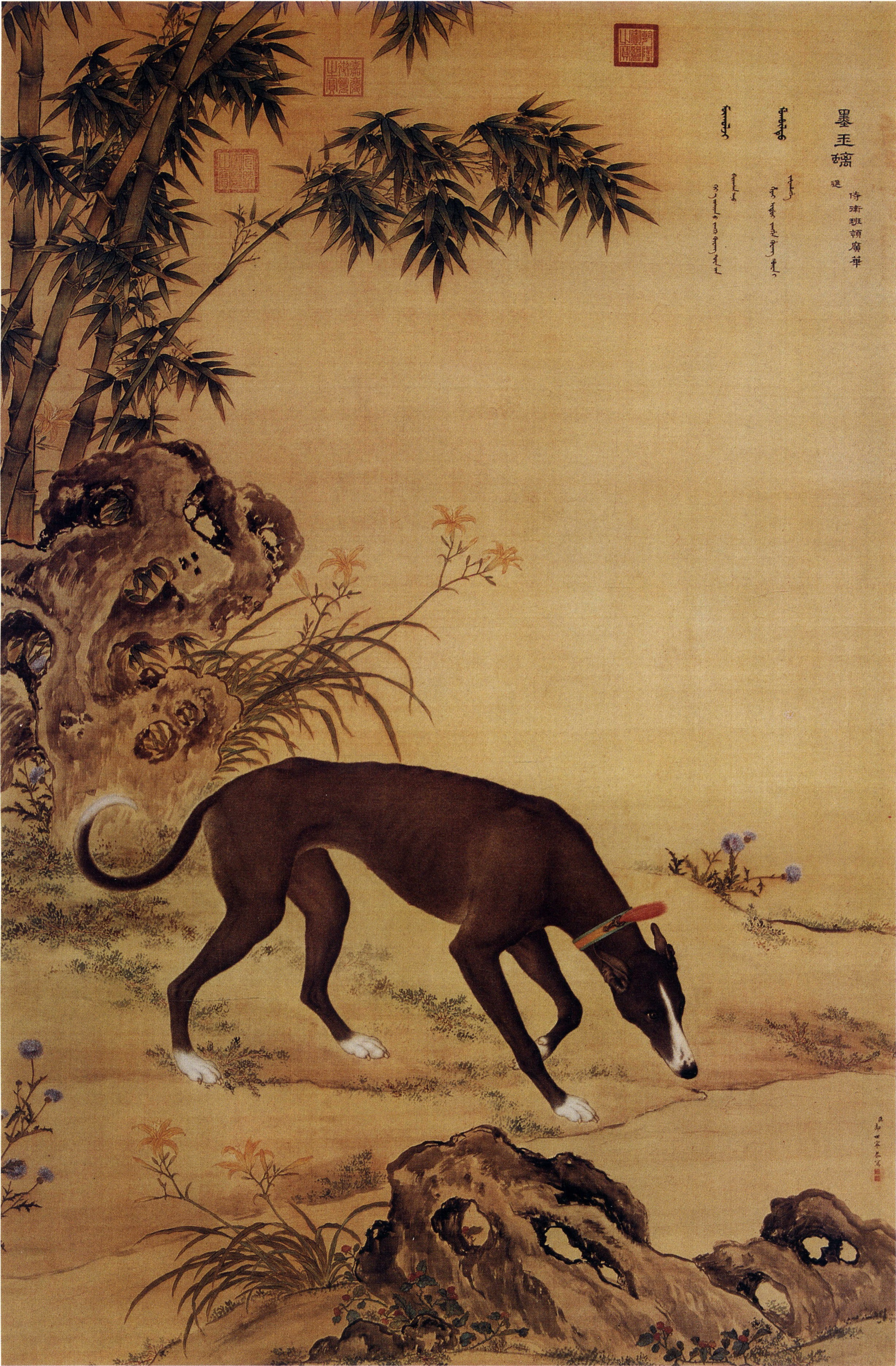
One of a series in Ten Prized Dogs, painted by the Lang Shining

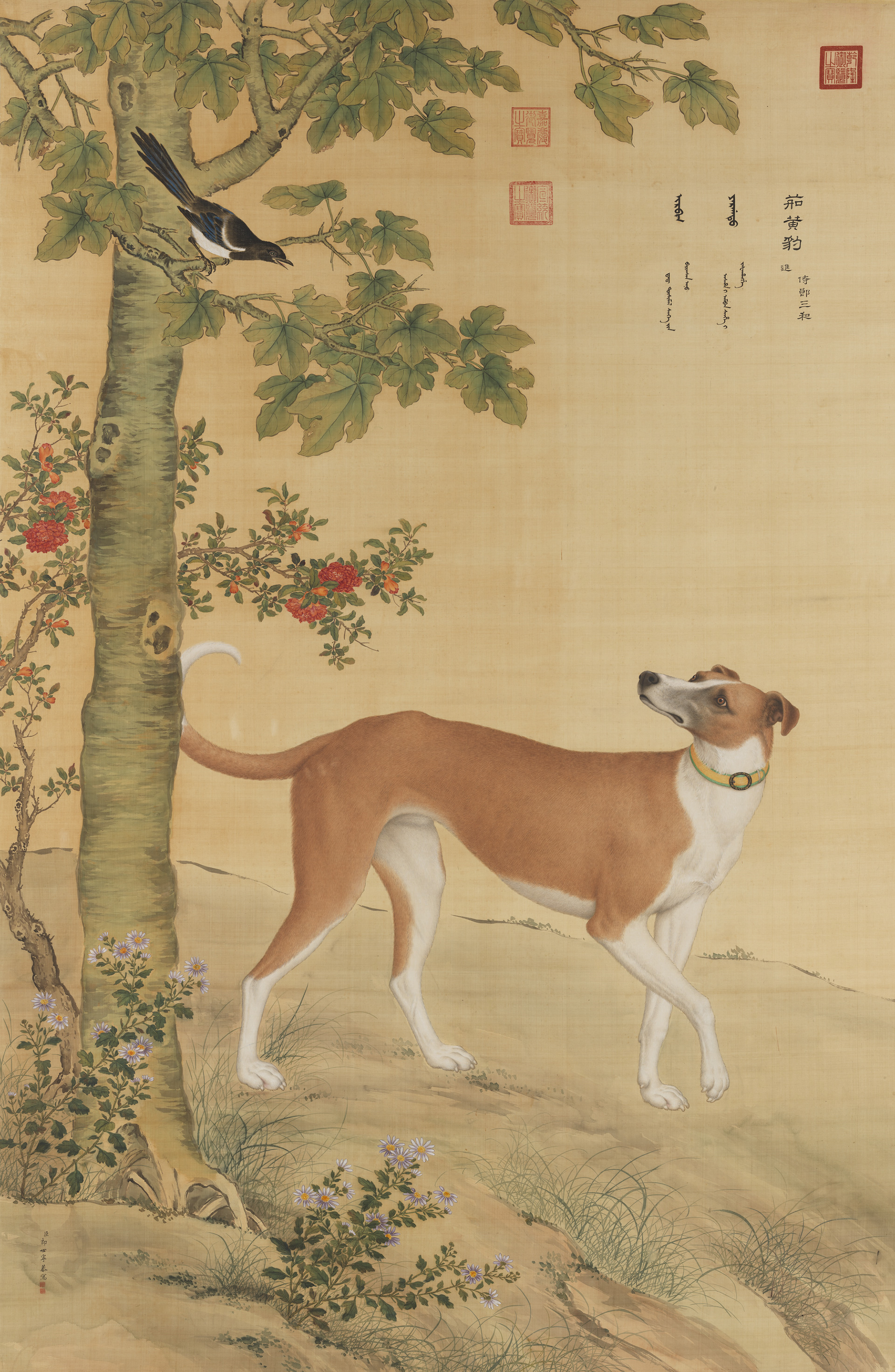
One of a series in Ten Prized Dogs, painted by the Lang Shining

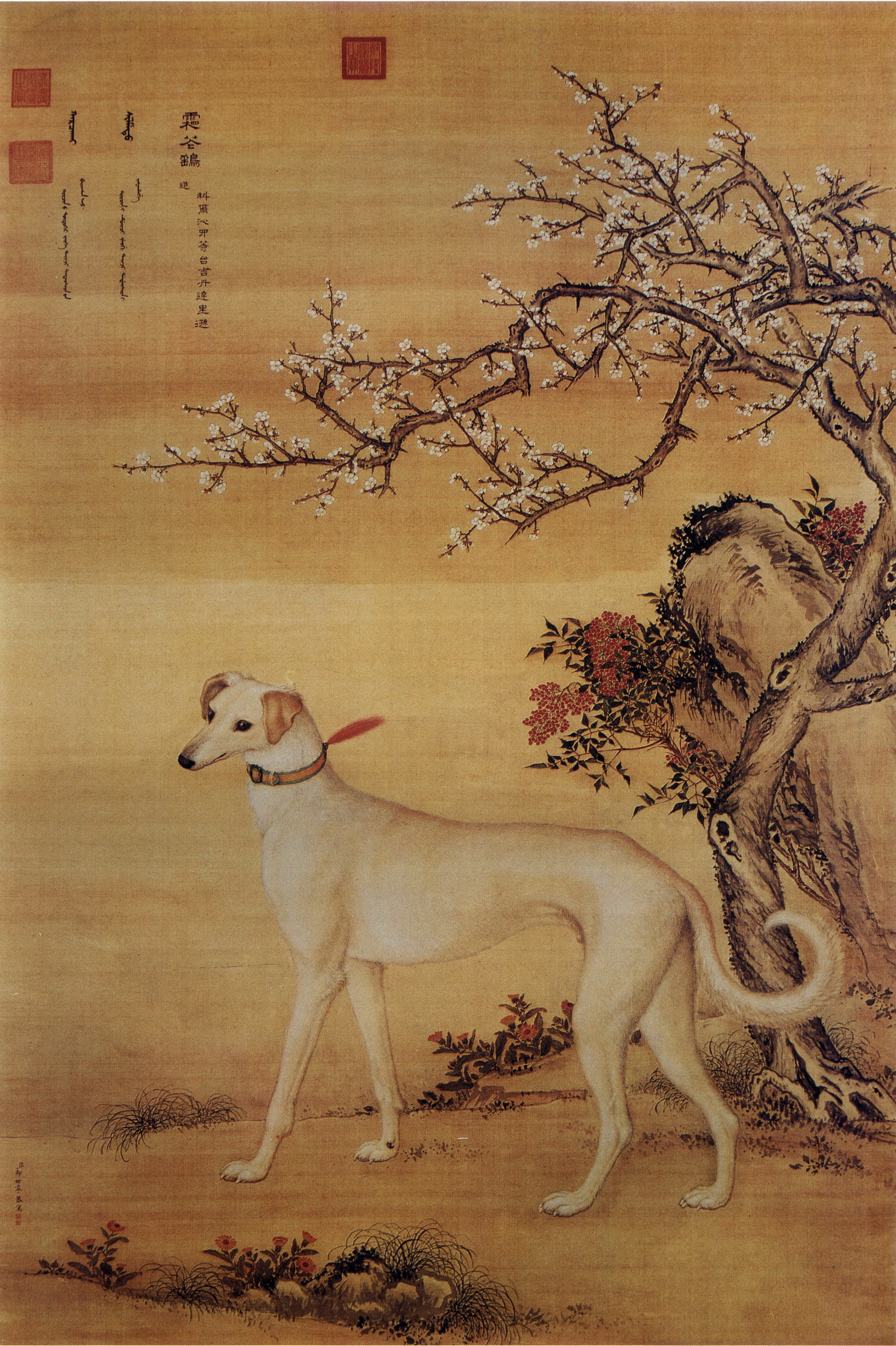
One of a series in Ten Prized Dogs, painted by the Lang Shining

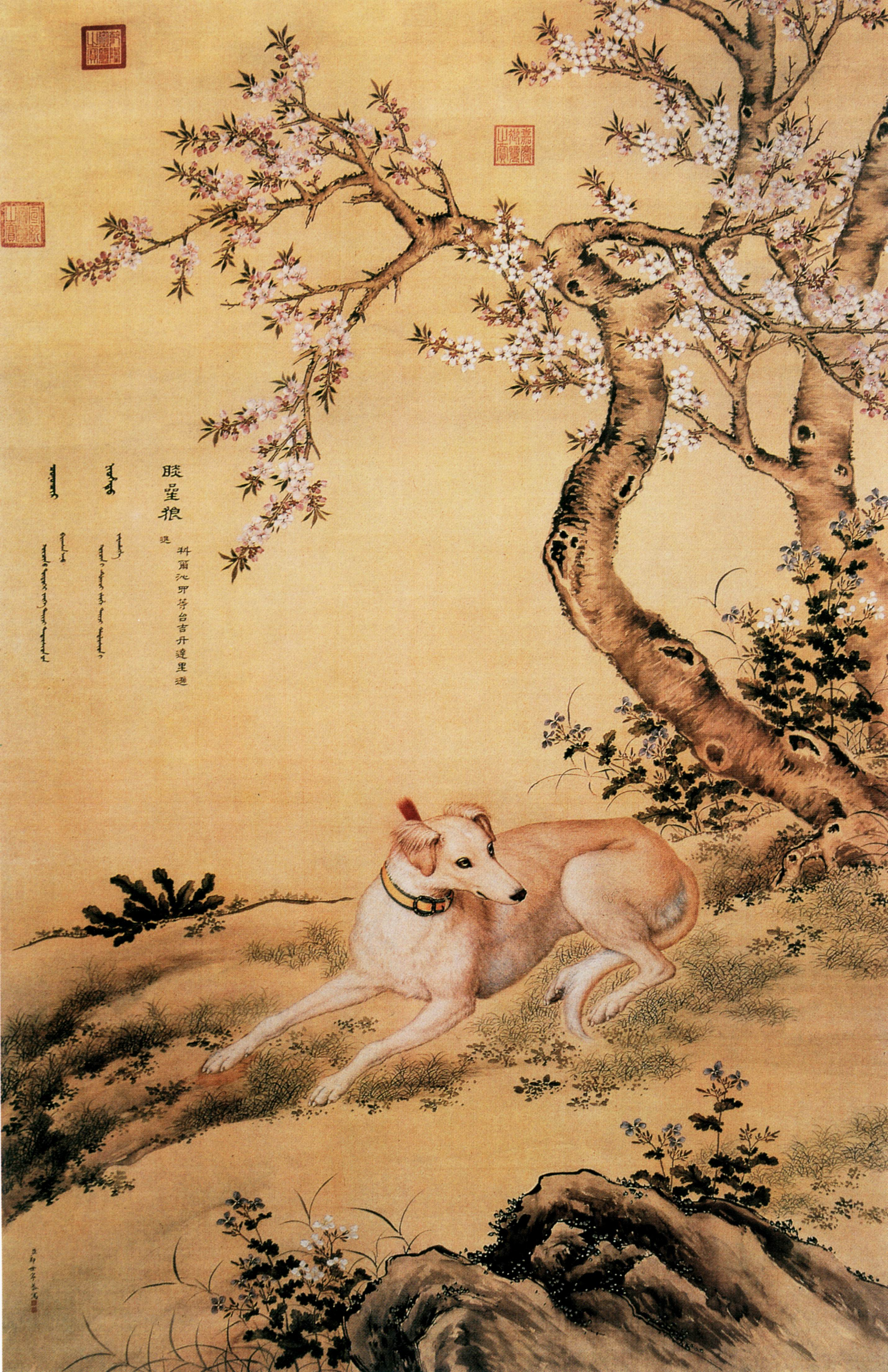
One of a series in Ten Prized Dogs, painted by the Lang Shining

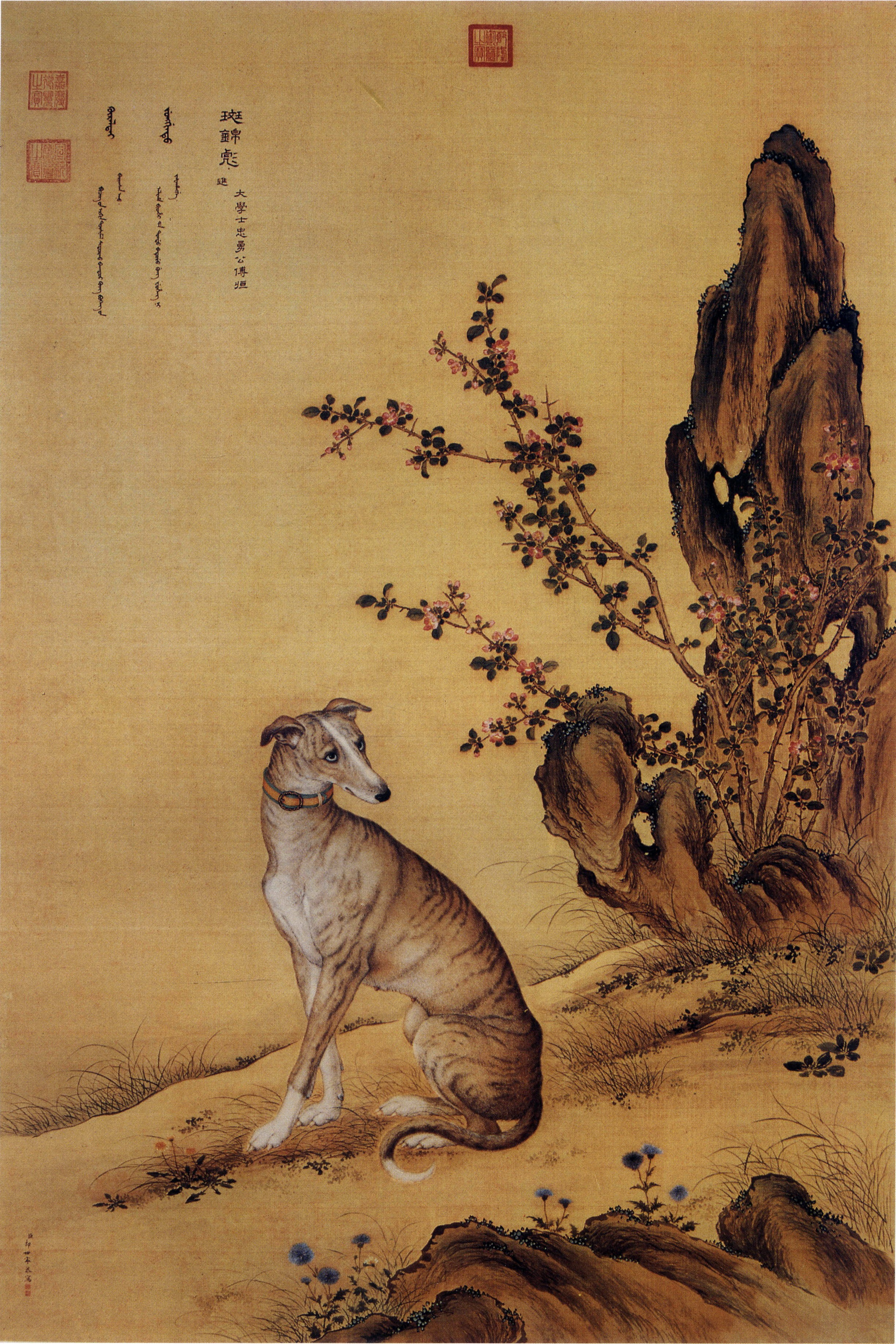
One of a series in Ten Prized Dogs, painted by the Lang Shining

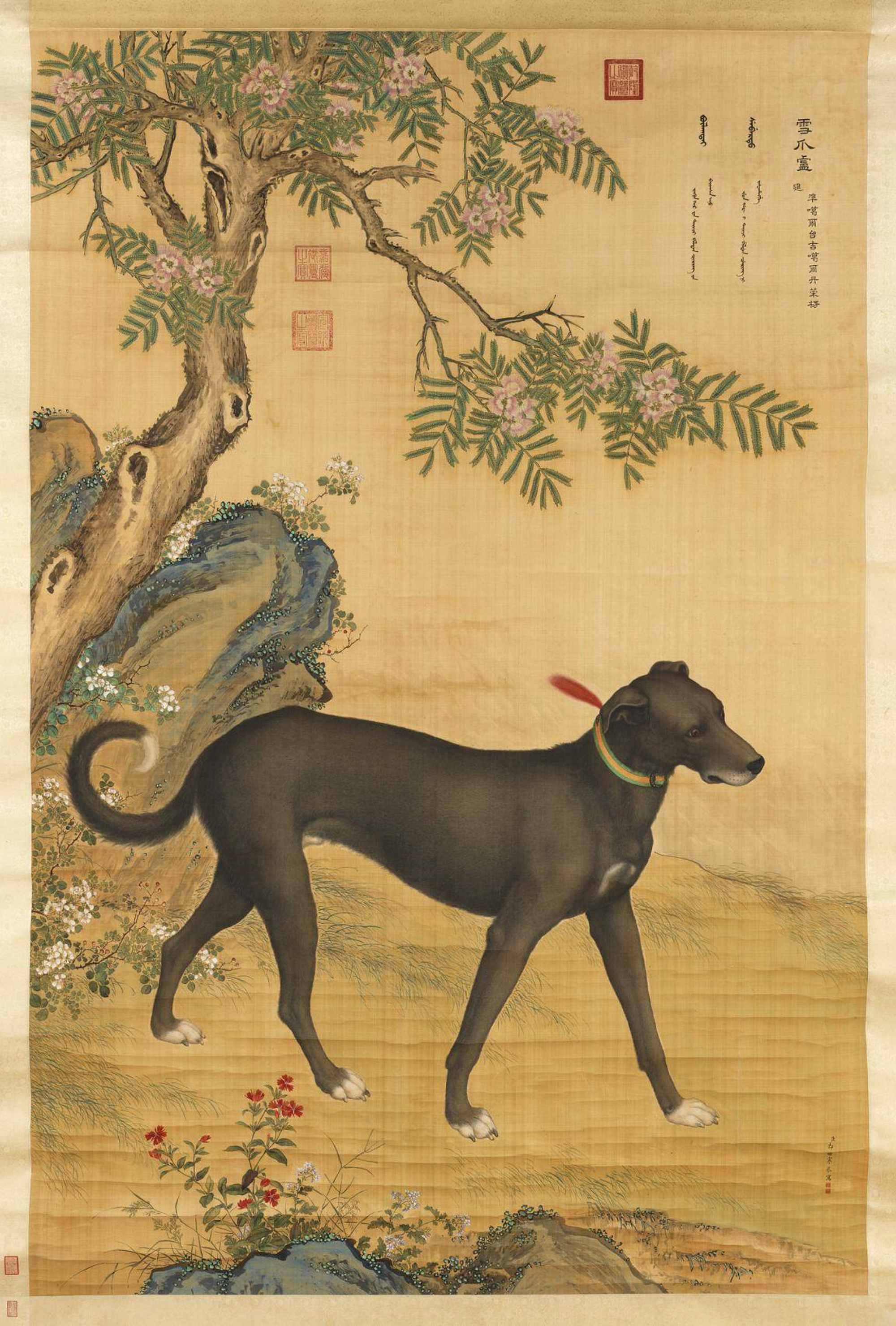
One of a series in Ten Prized Dogs, painted by the Lang Shining

=== Republic of China ( 1912 C.E. — 1949 C.E. ) ===
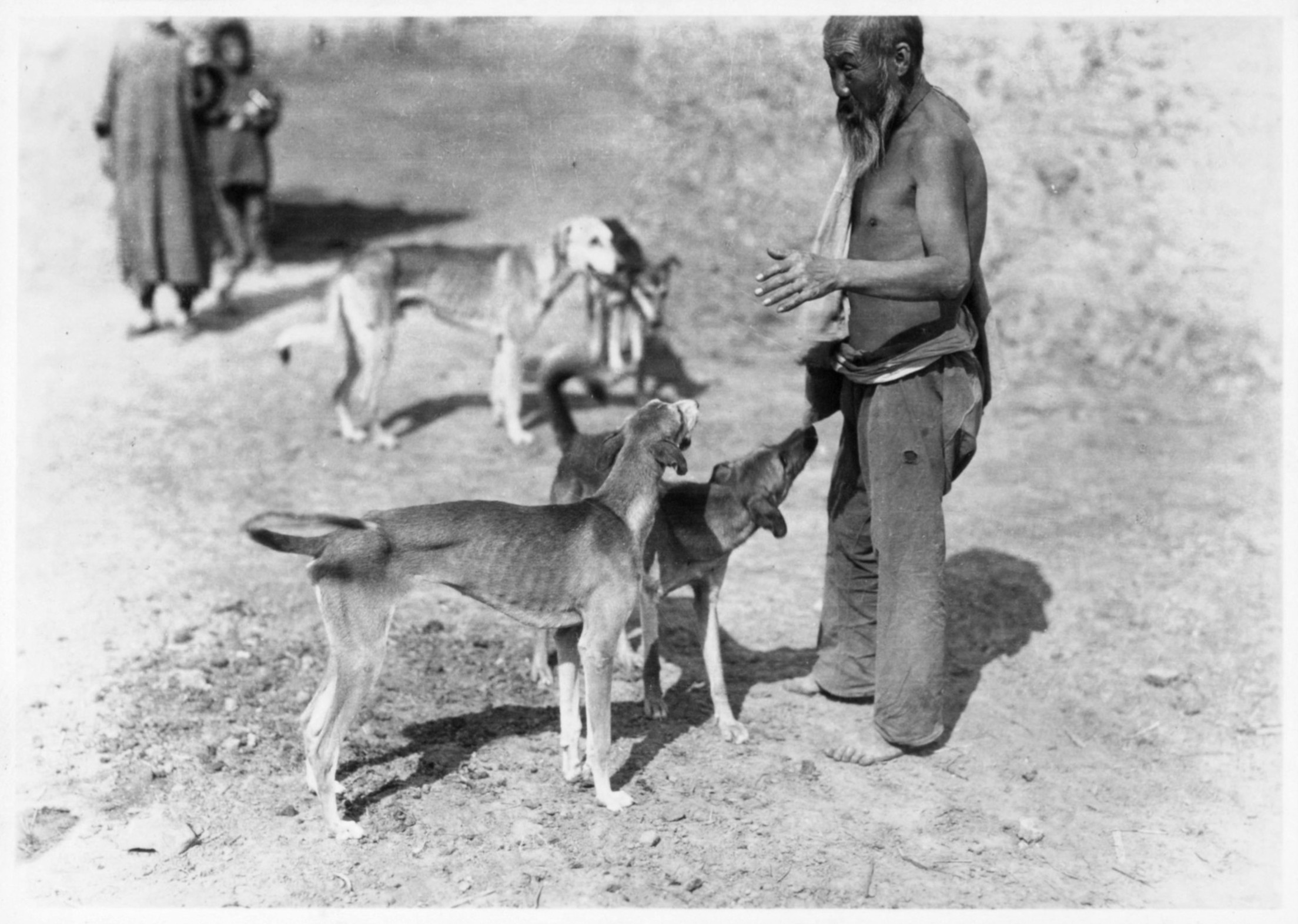
Four Menggu Xigou

== In popular culture ==
=== Manhua (Chinese comics) ===
- Xiaotian (Chinese: 哮天): A character from Manhua Fei Ren Zai (Chinese: 非人哉). His true form is a gray-blue Xigou. He is based on the Chinese mythological beast Xiaotian Quan. (Chinese: 哮天犬).

=== TV series (Chinese Dramas) ===
- Axi (Chinese: 阿細): It is a gray-white Xigou that appears in the eleventh episode of the Chinese TV series The Longest Day in Chang'an (Chinese: 長安十二時辰). It is a royal hound that was temporarily borrowed as a tracking dog.
