= One Hundred Thousand Bad Jokes =

Series of Chinese comics

One Hundred Thousand Bad Jokes (Chinese: 十万个冷笑话) is a series of Chinese comics that are being serialized on the Chinese online comic website YouYaoQi. One Hundred Thousand Bad Jokes is mainly constituted by several stories of parodies of classic Chinese animations and comics such as Prince Nezha's Triumph Against Dragon King and Calabash Brothers, famous Japanese animations and comics like Detective Conan and Ultraman, western fairytales such as Pinocchio and Snow White, as well as some original mini-series. The chapters have little to no specific relationship between each other, but still subtle clues exist between each story. The lines in the comics are funny and popular among the Chinese netizens, partly due to heavy uses of internet slang, Japanese animations and comics (e.g. in the story of The Calabash Brothers, the characters use various Japanese words). This comic has now been remade by the original author and YouYaoQi into an animated version, which is regarded as a milestone for the Chinese animation industry. After being released one episode per month, animation has temporarily ended.

In 2014, the original team who created One Hundred Thousand Bad Jokes released a film version.
