= Yan Huaili =

Chinese actor

- 闫怀礼
- Born: July 24, 1936; Fengnan, Tangshan, Hebei, China
- Died: April 12, 2009 (aged 72); Beijing, China
- Education: Beijing People's Art Theatre
- Occupation: Actor
- Years active: 1982–2002
- Notable work: Journey to the West
- Political party: Revolutionary Committee of the Kuomintang

Yan Huaili (simplified Chinese: 闫怀礼; traditional Chinese: 閆懷禮; pinyin: Yán Huaílǐ; 24 July 1936 – 12 April 2009) was a Chinese actor best known for his role as Sha Wujing in the 1986 television series Journey to the West. Yan was a member of the Revolutionary Committee of the Kuomintang.

== Early life ==
Yan was born in Fengnan District of Tangshan city, Hebei province, on July 24, 1936, during the Republic of China.

After the founding of the Communist State, Yan worked as an accountant in China Construction Bank in Qinhuangdao.

== Career ==
In 1958, Yan entered in the Beijing People's Art Theatre, majoring in acting.

In the 1960s, Yan acted in Taking Tiger Mountain by Strategy, Red Crag and The Big Fisherman. During the Cultural Revolution, Yan acted in Cai Wenji, Wang Zhaojun and Aesop.

Yan rose to fame after portraying Sha Wujing in Journey to the West, a historical television series starring Xu Shaohua, Chi Chongrui, Zhang Jinlai, Ma Dehua, Wang Yue, Cui Jingfu and Liu Dagang. The series was one of the most watched ones in mainland China in that year.

In 1991, Yan played the character Cheng Pu in Romance of the Three Kingdoms, adapted from Luo Guanzhong's classical novel of the same title.

In 1993, Yan made his film debut in Wong Jing's Kung Fu Cult Master, playing a monk in Shaolin Temple, a film starring Jet Li, Sharla Cheung, Chingmy Yau and Gigi Lai.

In 2000, Yan appeared as Pei Yan, an official of the Chinese dynasty Tang dynasty, in Palace of Desire.

In 2002, Yan participated in The Eloquent Ji Xiaolan as Chen Huizu, an ancient costume comedy television series starring Zhang Guoli, Zhang Tielin, Wang Gang and Yuan Li.

On April 12, 2009, Yan died of interstitial lung disease at Beijing Shijitan Hospital.

== Filmography ==
=== Film ===
Year	English title	Chinese title	Role	Notes
1993	Kung Fu Cult Master	倚天屠龙记之魔教教主	a monk	

=== Television ===
Year	English title	Chinese title	Role	Notes
1982	Journey to the West	西游记	Sha Wujing/Bull Demon King/Dragon King/Daode Tianzun/Qianliyan/Monk in Guanyin Temple/Juanlian Dajaing	
1991	Romance of the Three Kingdoms	三国演义	Cheng Pu	
1996		东周列国春秋篇	Duke Zhuang II of Qi	
2000	Palace of Desire	大明宫词	Pei Yan	
2002	The Eloquent Ji Xiaolan	铁齿铜牙纪晓岚	Chen Huizu	
