= Zhu Longguang =

- 朱龙广
- Born: Zhu Longguang; September 1, 1939; Xi'an, Shaanxi, China
- Died: August 2, 2025 (aged 85)
- Occupations: Actor, director
- Known for: Tunnel Warfare (1965), Journey to the West (1986)

Zhu Longguang (simplified Chinese: 朱龙广; traditional Chinese: 朱龍廣; pinyin: Zhū Lóngguǎng; 1 September 1939–2 August 2025) was a Chinese actor and television director. He was best known for his role as militia leader Gao Chuanbao in the 1965 film Tunnel Warfare and for his portrayal of the Tathagata Buddha in the 1986 television series Journey to the West.

== Early life and education ==
Zhu Longguang was born in Xi'an, Shaanxi. Zhu graduated from the performance department of the Lanzhou Art Academy in 1962.

== Career ==
After graduating from high school, Zhu Longguang entered the performance department of the Lanzhou Art Academy, from which he graduated in 1962. During his studies, he was mistakenly diagnosed with tuberculosis by the school clinic and took a leave of absence to return to Xi'an. After examinations at seven hospitals, the diagnosis was confirmed to be incorrect. While recuperating at home, the Baoji Municipal Drama Troupe was staging the play Conquering the Dragon and Tiger, and Zhu was introduced to the production and cast as the male lead. The role earned him first prize in the National Young Actors Competition.

In 1961, Zhu was transferred to the Engineering Corps Cultural Troupe of the Central Military Commission, where he served as an actor, troupe leader, and director.

In 1965, Zhu appeared in the film Tunnel Warfare. After the Engineering Corps Cultural Troupe was assigned to participate in the adaptation of the film, he was selected by the director to play the protagonist Gao Chuanbao. He subsequently joined the production team and traveled to Ranzhuang, Qingyuan County, Hebei Province, for filming. After its release, Zhu’s portrayal of the militia leader Gao Chuanbao became widely known across China.

During the Cultural Revolution, in 1969, Zhu was demobilized from the military and assigned to work as a machinist at the Dongfeng Instrument Factory in Xi'an due to being considered "ideologically contaminated and insufficiently reformed". He was later transferred to the factory's propaganda department. About one year later, during a military industrial arts performance, his self-written and performed piece Gear Problem attracted the attention of cultural officials in Shaanxi Province. He was subsequently transferred to the Shaanxi People's Art Theatre, where he worked in admissions and teaching. In this role, he served as an examiner and admitted students including Li Qi.

Zhu gained national recognition in 1965 through his role as Gao Chuanbao in Tunnel Warfare. In the 1980s, director Yang Jie cast him as the Tathagata Buddha in the 1986 adaptation of Journey to the West. His performance became one of the most recognizable portrayals of the character in Chinese television.

Zhu later worked as a director for stage plays and television productions, including Rolling Yellow River (1980) and The Source (1982). He also served as vice-dean and senior advisor at the Oriental Film and Television College.

== Cultural impact and legacy ==
Zhu died in Beijing on 2 August 2025, aged 86. Liu Xiao Ling Tong, who played Sun Wukong in the series, wrote a message mourning his death. He called Zhu the "eternal Tathagata Buddha", remembering the role for which many viewers knew him.

Zhu Longguang became well known for playing Tathagata Buddha in the 1986 television series Journey to the West. Director Yang Jie had trouble finding an actor for the part. She chose Zhu after seeing him in costume and makeup. His face and manner suited the role, and many viewers came to remember him as the Buddha from the series. Yang later recalled that people saw him as a "living Buddha".

A story about Zhu's visit to Thailand has appeared in Chinese newspapers and entertainment articles. He was said to have gone shopping for a Buddha amulet while on holiday. When he looked at one, he found that the Buddha's face looked like his own from Journey to the West. He had not expected to see his television image on a religious object sold in Thailand.

== Selected filmography ==
Actor

- Tunnel Warfare (1965) – Gao Chuanbao
- Journey to the West (1986) – Tathagata
- My Own Swordsman (2006)
- Wu Cheng'en and Journey to the West (2010)

Director

- Rolling Yellow River (1980)
- The Source (1982)
