= 6th Golden Eagle Awards =

Chinese TV awards ceremony in 1988

The 6th Golden Eagle Awards were held June 12, 1988, in Shenyang, Liaoning province. Nominees and winners are listed below, winners are in bold.

== Best Television Series ==
not awarded this year

- Journey to the West/西游记
- Snow City/雪城
- Plainclothes Policeman/便衣警察

== Best Mini-series ==
not awarded this year

- Army Soul/军魂
- Larceny of Animal Kingdom/动物王国窃案

== Best Lead Actor in a Television Series ==
- **Liu Xiao Ling Tong for Journey to the West**

== Best Lead Actress in a Television Series ==
- **Ma Lan for Yan Fengying**

== Best Supporting Actor in a Television Series ==
- **Shen Junyi for Wu Long Shan Jiao Fei Ji**

== Best Supporting Actress in a Television Series ==
- **Ni Ping for Snow City**
