= Liu Dagang =

Chinese actor (1947–2025)

- 刘大刚
- Born: May 18, 1947; Beijing, China
- Died: November 3, 2025 (aged 78); Beijing, China
- Occupation: Actor
- Years active: 1993–2025
- Agent: China Peking Opera

Chinese name
- Traditional Chinese: 劉大剛
- Simplified Chinese: 刘大刚
Transcriptions
Standard Mandarin
- Hanyu Pinyin: Liǘ Dàgāng

Liu Dagang (May 18, 1947 – November 3, 2025) was a Chinese actor best known for his role as Sha Wujing in the 1986 television series Journey to the West. He was a National Class-A Actor.

== Life and career ==
Liu was born in Beijing, China on May 18, 1947. He was an actor at China Peking Opera.

He made his film debut in Kung Fu Cult Master (1993), playing a Shaolin monk. That same year, he had a minor role as Duan Hua in the historical television series Empress Dowager Cixi.

In 1994, he portrayed Kangxi Emperor in the epic fantasy television series The Book and the Sword, adapted from Hong Kong writer Jin Yong's wuxia novel of the same title. At the same year, he also portrayed Sun Chen, a regent of the state of Eastern Wu during the Three Kingdoms period, in the historical television series Romance of the Three Kingdoms, based on the novel by the same name by Luo Guanzhong.

In 1995, he portrayed Han Yuan in the historical television series Wu Zetian.

In 1996, he had a supporting role in the historical television series Prime Minister Liu Luoguo.

In 1998, he rose to fame after playing Sha Wujing in the shenmo television series Journey to the West, adapted from Wu Cheng'en's classical novel of the same title.

In 2000, he appeared in Smart Kid, an ancient costume comedy television series starring Dicky Cheung and Li Bingbing.

In 2003, he participated in Sword Master, a wuxia television series adaptation based on the novel of the same name by Taiwanese novelist Gu Long.

In 2004, he filmed as the President of martial arts school in Silver Hawk, a film starring Li Bingbing.

In 2006, he had a cameo appearance in The Great Dunhuang, a historical television series starring Chen Hao and Tang Guoqiang.

In 2007, he starred opposite Liu Xiao Ling Tong, Ma Dehua, Chi Chongrui in Wu Cheng'en and Journey to the West.

In 2010, he was cast in The Dream of Red Mansions, playing the father of Jiang Tong's character.

In 2015, he was cast in the lead role of Sha Wujing in the Paramount Pictures's production Journey to the West 3D, a 3D Chinese-American action fantasy film adaptation based on the novel of the same name by Wu Cheng'en.

Liu died in Beijing on November 3, 2025, at the age of 78.

== Filmography ==
=== Film ===
Year	English title	Chinese title	Role	Notes
1993	Kung Fu Cult Master	倚天屠龙记之魔教教主	A Shaolin monk	
2004	Silver Hawk	飞鹰女侠	President of martial arts school	
2018	Miser	财迷	Sha Dahai	
TBA	Journey to the West 3D	敢问路在何方	Sha Wujing	

=== Television ===
Year	English title	Chinese title	Role	Notes
1993	Empress Dowager Cixi	戏说慈禧	Duan Hua	
1994	The Book and the Sword	书剑恩仇录	Kangxi Emperor	
1994	Romance of the Three Kingdoms	三国演义	Sun Chen	
1995	Wu Zetian	武则天	Han Yuan	
1995	Legend of Avalokitesvara	观世音传奇	Gautama Buddha	
1996	Prime Minister Liu Luoguo	宰相刘罗锅	Xu Mingtang	
1998	Journey to the West	西游记	Sha Wujing	
2000	Smart Kid	机灵小不懂	Yan Zheng	
2002	A Special Citizen	非常公民	Wei Da	
2002	Princess Shisan	十三格格		
2003	South Shaolin	南少林	Monk Xuantong	
2003	Sword Master	三少爷的剑	Dao Yan	
2004		江山儿女几多情	Miao Xian	
2004	The Story of the Queen	皇后进宫	Shi Zhu	
2006	The Great Dunhuang	大敦煌	Ashe'na	
2007	Wu Cheng'en and Journey to the West	吴承恩与西游记	Sha Wujing	
2010	The Dream of Red Mansions	红楼梦	Jia Jing	
