= Xu Shaohua (actor) =

Chinese actor

- 徐少华
- Born: 1958 (age 67–68); Huangdao District, Qingdao, Shandong, China
- Education: Shandong University of Arts
- Occupation: Actor
- Years active: 1982-present
- Notable work: Journey to the West
- Spouse: Yang Kun
- Children: Daughter: Xu Lu

Chinese name
- Traditional Chinese: 徐少華
- Simplified Chinese: 徐少华
Transcriptions
Standard Mandarin
- Hanyu Pinyin: Xú Shàohuá

Xu Shaohua (Chinese: 徐少华; born 1958) is a Chinese actor best known for his role as Tang Sanzang in the 1986 television series Journey to the West. Xu is the Vice-President of Shandong Theatre and Shandong Dramatist association.

== Life ==
Xu was born in Huangdao District of Qingdao city, Shandong province in 1958. Xu aspired to act from an early age and he studied dance during his early years. After the Cultural Revolution. On 6 November 1976, at the age of 18, Xu moved to Jinan from Qingdao, he lived in Jinan about 34 years. Xu entered Shandong University of Arts in August 1985, majoring in acting.

Xu rose to fame after portraying Tang Sanzang in Journey to the West, a historical television series starring Chi Zhongrui, Zhang Jinlai, Ma Dehua, Wang Yue, Yan Huaili, Cui Jingfu and Liu Dagang.

In 1983, Xu appeared in Outlaws of the Marsh, based on the novel by the same name by Shi Nai'an.

In 1994, Xu co-starred in the Romance of the Three Kingdoms as Zhang Liao, a television series adaptation based on the novel of the same name by Luo Guanzhong.

Xu also acted as Tang Sanzang or his historical prototype Xuanzang in several television series, such as Tang Xuanzang (1998), Love Legend of the Tang Dynasty (2001) and Carol of Zhenguan (2007).

== Personal life ==
Xu married Yang Kun (杨琨), their daughter, Xu Lu (徐露), was born in 1987.

== Filmography ==
=== Film ===
Year	English title	Chinese title	Role	Notes
1983	Pure change	精变	Yuan Feng	
1991	A Monk in Bif City	都市和尚	The margin of mage	
2008	One Hundred Yuan	小胡同大尊严	Mr. Long	
2008	The Legend of Qi Shan Mountain	棋山传奇		
2013	Jingzhi Transportation Station	景芝交通站	Wang Anzhi	
2016	Stage	舞台	guest	
2018	Environment Lists	环保硬汉	Wang Tongdao	
2019	Youth	误入青春	Bai Kaiyuan	

=== Television ===
Year	English title	Chinese title	Role	Notes
1982	Journey to the West	西游记	Tang Sanzang	
1983	Outlaws of the Marsh	水浒传	Chen Xing	
1986	Strange Stories from a Chinese Studio	聊斋	Meng Wutou/ Meng Sheng	
1989	The War of Tai'erzhuang	血泉	Fu Jianxing	
1992	Xi Shi	西施	Fan Li	
1993		武夷仙凡界	A Yong	
1994	Romance of the Three Kingdoms	三国演义	Zhang Liao	
1995	Si Maqian	司马迁	Xu Rang	
1998	Journey to the West	西游记续集	Tang Sanzang	
1998	Tang Sanzang	唐玄奘	Xuanzang	
2001	Love Legend of the Tang Dynasty	大唐情史	Xuanzang	
2007	Carol of Zhenguan	贞观长歌	Xuanzang	
