= Zuo Dabin =

Chinese actress and educator

- 左大玢
- Born: October 22, 1943 (age 82); Xingyang, Henan, China
- Other name: Honghui (红辉)
- Occupations: Actress, educator
- Years active: 1959–present
- Organization(s): Hunan Vocational College of Art; Hunan Opera Theatre
- Political party: Chinese Communist Party
- Parents: Zuo Zonglian (father); Zheng Fuqiu (mother)

Zuo Dabin (Chinese: 左大玢; pinyin: Zuǒ Dàbīn; born 22 October 1943), also known by her art name Honghui (红辉), is a Chinese actress and educator best known for her role as Guanyin in Journey to the West.

She was a member of the 7th and 8th National Committee of the Chinese People's Political Consultative Conference. She is vice president of Hunan Federation of literary and Art Circles and Hunan Drama Association.

== Early life and education ==
Zuo was born on October 22, 1943, in Xingyang, Henan, to Zuo Zonglian (左宗濂), a major general under the leadership of Cheng Qian in the KMT troops and magistrate of Ru County (1940–1943) and Xingyang County (1943–1945), and Zheng Fuqiu (郑福秋), a Xiang opera performer. She has an elder sister. Her ancestral home is in Changsha, Hunan. In 1954 she was accepted to Hunan Drama School, majoring in Xiang opera. After graduation, she was assigned to Hunan Opera Theatre as an actress.

== Acting career ==
In 1959, when Mao Zedong returned to Hunan, she performed For Life or for Death. After the performance, Mao Zedong invited her to dance.

In 1966, the Cultural Revolution broke out, she was denounced as a "shoots of revisionism" because her father once served in the National Revolutionary Army. She was sent to the Dao County to do farm works for two years.

In 1973, she made her film debut in Song of Teacher, playing Yu Ying. Jiang Qing criticizes her "acting like a young mistress of the house! The film is a poisonous grass!" On August 4 of that same year, she made a review at the Beijing Exhibition Hall. After watching the film, Mao Zedong said: "What is the 'big poisonous grass'? What's wrong with it?" Mao Zedong's speech lessened her criticism.

In 1976, at the age of 33, she acted as Guanyin in The Legend of Chasing Fish. After watching the opera, director Yang Jie felt very satisfied. In 1982, Yang Jie invited her to portray Guanyin in Journey to the West, adapted from Ming dynasty novelist Wu Cheng'en's classical novel of the same title. The series was one of the most watched ones in mainland China in that year.

She joined the Chinese Communist Party in 1984.

Since 2003, she taught at Hunan Vocational College of Art and Hunan Opera Theatre.

== Cultural impact ==
Zuo Dapan's portrayal of Guanyin in the 1986 television series Journey to the West is widely considered the definitive onscreen representation of the Bodhisattva. Her performance profoundly impacted modern Chinese folk religion, to the extent that her likeness permanently altered how the deity is visually depicted in modern China.

When director Yang Jie first cast her in the role, she faced pushback from crew members who felt the 39-year-old Zuo was too old and not conventionally beautiful enough for a television deity. Yang famously defended the casting by stating, "I want a Buddha statue, not a pretty face." To prepare for the role, Zuo traveled to temples across China, studying the postures, hand gestures, and expressions of over 10,000 different Guanyin statues.

During the multi-year production of the series, the cast and crew repeatedly reported inexplicable meteorological coincidences associated with Zuo. According to production lore, when the crew was shooting on Mount Emei and Mount Qingcheng, they were repeatedly delayed by days of heavy rain and overcast skies; however, the moment Zuo stepped onto the set in her Guanyin costume, the rain would abruptly stop and the sun would break through the clouds. Zuo, who was not religious prior to the show, was so deeply affected by these recurring coincidences that she subsequently became a devout Buddhist.

Because the show was filmed in remote areas of rural China, locals who saw Zuo in full makeup frequently believed she was a living manifestation of the Bodhisattva. Villagers would drop to their knees in the mud to burn incense before her, and parents brought their sick children to the set, begging the "living Bodhisattva" to touch their heads for healing. Following the series' broadcast, this reverence intensified. During a visit to Kaifu Temple in Changsha, she was surrounded by hundreds of worshippers who knelt and chanted "The Bodhisattva has descended."

Ultimately, her televised performance became so iconic that the visual boundary between the actress and the deity vanished. Across rural China, it became common for worshippers to frame her television stills and use them as deity portraits on their home altars. Today, many modern paintings, printed scrolls, and even newly sculpted temple statues of Guanyin in China are explicitly modeled after Zuo Dapan's facial features and television costume.

== Filmography ==
=== Film ===
Year	English title	Chinese title	Role	Notes
1973	Song of Teacher	园丁之歌	Yu Ying	

=== Television ===
Year	English title	Chinese title	Role	Notes
1986	Journey to the West	西游记	Guan Yin	
2000	Journey to the West	西游记续集	Guan Yin	

=== Xiang opera ===
Year	English title	Chinese title	Role	Notes
1960	The Broken Bridge	断桥		
1978	Guo Liang	郭亮		
1982	Princess Baihua	百花公主		
1986	Giving a Sword	赠剑		
1989	Yang Saifeng	杨赛风		
1997	Zixue	子血		

== Variety show ==
Year	English title	Chinese title	Role	Notes
2018	Ace vs Ace	王牌对王牌	Herself	

== Awards ==
Year	Award	Category	Result	Notes
1989	6th Plum Blossom Prize	Traditional Opera Award	Won	
