= Wu Cheng'en and Journey to the West =

Chinese name
- Traditional Chinese: 吳承恩與西遊記
- Simplified Chinese: 吴承恩与西游记
Transcriptions
Standard Mandarin
- Hanyu Pinyin: Wú Chéng'ēn yǔ Xīyóujì
- Genre: Chinese mythology, shenmo, fantasy, adventure
- Written by: Wang Shuqiang; Ding Aimin
- Directed by: Kan Weiping
- Presented by: Wang Yajun; Yin Lianzhao
- Starring: Liu Xiao Ling Tong; Chi Chongrui; Ma Dehua; Liu Dagang
- Opening theme: Meng Xi You (梦西游) performed by Ding Guagua
- Ending theme: Chuan Jia Bao (传家宝) performed by Han Dong
- Country of origin: China
- Original language: Mandarin
- No. of episodes: 45

Production
- Executive producers: Yang Weiguang; Wang Yiming; Zou Weirui
- Producers: Xu Mingzhe; Wu Qiuxia
- Production location: China
- Cinematography: Chen Hong
- Editor: Hong Mei
- Running time: 45 minutes per episode
- Production companies: Beijing Yongtong Media; Mei Ah Spring International Film Culture Broadcasting (Beijing); Beijing Zhongshixie Production; Chinese Television Artists Association

Original release
- Network: Shandong Television
- Release: July 2010

Wu Cheng'en and Journey to the West is a Chinese television series about the life of Wu Cheng'en and his inspiration for writing the 16th-century novel Journey to the West. The series was directed by Kan Weiping and consists of a total of 45 episodes shot in high definition, each 45 minutes long and containing 10 minutes of 3-D effects. The original lead actors of the 1986 television series Journey to the West starred in Wu Cheng'en and Journey to the West and reprised their roles: Liu Xiao Ling Tong as Sun Wukong, Chi Chongrui as Tang Sanzang and Ma Dehua as Zhu Bajie. Sha Wujing, however, was portrayed by Liu Dagang because the original actor, Yan Huaili, died in April 2009. It was broadcast by Shandong Qilu TV in July 2010.

== Cast ==
- Liu Xiao Ling Tong as Wu Cheng'en / Sun Wukong
- Chi Chongrui as Tang Sanzang
- Ma Dehua as Yao Laoda / Zhu Bajie
- Liu Dagang as Chen Long / Sha Wujing
- Li Wenying as Ye Yun / Chang'e
  - Yang Zi as young Ye Yun
- Ma Su as Niu Yufeng / Lotus Fairy
- Shi Xiaoqun as Bai Xueyan / Huang Su'e / Ruler of Women's Country
- Sun Tao as Shen Kun
- Niu Ben as Li Laofuzi
- Zheng Shuang as Wu Chengjia
- Xue Yong as Luo Wanjin
- Shang Daqing as Luo Pang
  - Xie Yunshan as young Luo Pang
- Liu Jia as Guanyin
- Zhu Longguang as Monk Huifang / Buddha
- Wang Weiguo as Jiajing Emperor / Jade Emperor
- Tian Lianyuan as storyteller
- Jin Yang as Li Chunfang
- Guan Shaozeng as Wu Rui
- Xu Jingyi as Luo residence housekeeper
- Cao Li as Yan Song
- Zong Fengyan as Zhu Zaihou
- Qi Wenyao as Gui Youguang

== See also ==
- List of media adaptations of Journey to the West
