= Chi Chongrui =

Chinese actor (born 1952)

- 迟重瑞
- Born: December 23, 1952 (age 73); Beijing, China
- Education: Shanghai Theater Academy
- Occupations: Actor, businessman
- Years active: 1981–present
- Notable work: Journey to the West
- Spouse: Chen Lihua (m. 1990; died 2026)

Chi Chongrui (simplified Chinese: 迟重瑞; traditional Chinese: 遲重瑞; pinyin: Chí Chòngruì; born 23 December 1952) is a Chinese actor famous for his role as Tang Sanzang in the 1986 television series Journey to the West.

== Biography ==
=== Early life ===
Chi was born in a family of Peking opera actors, on December 23, 1952. During the Down to the Countryside Movement, he became a sent-down youth and worked in Heilongjiang Production and Construction Corps, then he became a soldier and serving in Yunan. He entered China Broadcasting Art Troupe while leaving the Army, two years later, he was accepted to Shanghai Theater Academy. After graduation, he was assigned to China Television Production Center (CTPC) as an actor.

=== Acting career ===
- In 1981, he had his first experience in front of the camera, and he was chosen to act as a support actor in Doulao Kouhua Kai.
- In 1982, he made his film debut in Bizhongqing, playing Huanshu.
- In 1983, he appeared in Golden Late Autumn and This Is Not A Mistake.
- In 1984, he participated in the spy thriller television series Harbin Enveloped in Darkness.
- In 1986, he rose to fame after portraying Tang Sanzang in the shenmo television series Journey to the West, adapted from Wu Cheng'en's classical novel of the same title.
- In 2005, he starred as Jianzhen in the historical television series Jianzhen Dongdu.
- In 2010, he starred opposite Liu Xiao Ling Tong, Ma Dehua, Liu Dagang in Wu Cheng'en and Journey to the West.
- In 2015, he was cast in the lead role of Tang Sanzang in the Paramount Pictures's production Journey to the West 3D, a 3D Chinese-American action fantasy film adaptation based on the novel of the same name by Wu Cheng'en.

== Personal life ==
In 1990, Chi married Chen Lihua, one of China's richest women.

== Works ==
=== Television ===
Year	English title	Chinese title	Role	Notes
1981	Doulao Kouhua Kai	豆劳蔻花开		
1984	Harbin Enveloped in Darkness	夜幕下的哈尔滨	Sai Shangxiao	
1986-2000	Journey to the West	西游记	Tang Sanzang, various characters	18 episodes
2007	Jianzhen Dongdu	鉴真东渡	Jianzhen	
2010	Wu Cheng'en and Journey to the West	吴承恩与西游记	Tang Sanzang	

=== Film ===
Year	English title	Chinese title	Role	Notes
1981	Bean Flower			
1982	This Is Not A Mistake	这不是误会		
1982	Bizhongqing	笔中情	Huan Shu	
1983	Golden Late Autumn	金色的晚秋	Du Mingguang	
1986	War in North China	直奉大战	Li Yanqing	
2015	Journey to the West 3D	敢问路在何方	Tang Sanzang	
2022	Journey to the West: Five Elements Mountain	大梦西游之五行山	Tang Sanzang	Cameo role
