= Yang Jie (director) =

Chinese television producer and director (1929–2017)

- 杨洁
- Born: April 7, 1929; Sichuan, China
- Died: April 15, 2017 (aged 88); Beijing, China
- Burial place: Babaoshan, Beijing
- Education: Renmin University of China
- Occupations: Television director, producer
- Years active: 1961–2000
- Agents: China National Radio; China Central Television
- Spouses: Zhou Chuanji (former); Wang Chongqiu (m. 1969; died 2017)
- Children: 4
- Parents: Yang Bokai (father); Wei Shuyuan (mother)

Chinese name
- Traditional Chinese: 楊潔
- Simplified Chinese: 杨洁
Transcriptions
Standard Mandarin
- Hanyu Pinyin: Yáng Jié

Yang Jie (Chinese: 杨洁; 7 April 1929 - 15 April 2017) was a Chinese television director and producer best known for her work Journey to the West, adapted from the 16th century Ming dynasty novelist Wu Cheng'en's classical novel of the same title.

== Early life and education ==
Yang was born in Sichuan, on April 7, 1929, to Yang Bokai (杨伯恺), a political activist, and Wei Shuyuan (危淑元).

In 1945, she was sent to Yan'an, then she was accepted to Huabei Union University (now Renmin University of China). After graduation, she joined the People's Liberation Army. She was assigned to broadcasting stations as an announcer.

After the establishment of the Communist State in 1954, she was transferred to Beijing, where she worked at the Central People's Broadcasting Station (now China National Radio). In 1958 she entered the China Central Television.

== Career ==
Yang made her directorial debut Sweet Handkerchief in 1976.

In 1980, she was signed to direct the fantasy television series Journey to the West, based on the classical novel of the same title by the 16th century Ming dynasty novelist Wu Cheng'en. The series has been replayed almost 3,000 times every year on various Chinese Television channels and has received 6 billion views in the three decades. In 1988, Yang won Best Director at the Golden Eagle Awards, the China Television Artists Association's equivalent to the Emmys, for her work on Journey to the West. It also won the prize for Best Long Series at the 8th Flying Apsaras Awards, which recognize excellent Chinese TV programs.

In 1993, she directed the historical television series Zhu Yuanzhang. The drama stars Lü Qi as Hongwu Emperor, alongside Zhang Ying, Ye Qinglin, Wen Bodong, Cui Weining, Li Tang and Liu Falu.

In 1995, Yang was confirmed as director of Xi Shi. Based on the life of Xi Shi, it stars Jiang Qinqin as Xi Shi and Zhang Qiuge as Goujian, with Kou Zhenhai and Xu Shaohua. That same year, she also hired as director of Sima Qian. The series stars Qiu Yongli as Sima Qian, alongside Xu Huanshan, Zhang Qiuge, Wang Quanyou, and Xu Shaohua.

In 2000, she directed Journey to the West (Season 2), sequel to Journey to the West.

=== Death ===
On April 15, 2017, Yang died of cardiovascular disease in Beijing.

== Personal life ==
Yang was twice married. She had three children (two daughters and one son) with her former husband Zhou Chuanji (周传基), a director and professor at Beijing Film Academy.

In 1969 Yang was married to Wang Chongqiu (王崇秋), the cinematographer of Journey to the West. The couple had a daughter named Yang Yunfei (杨云菲).

== Filmography ==
=== Television ===
Year	English title	Chinese title	Notes
1976	Selling Water	卖水	
1976	Sweet Handkerchief	罗香帕	
1980	—N/a	恩与仇	
1980	Fish Chasing	追鱼	
1980	The Taoist in Mount Lao	崂山道士	
1986	Journey to the West	西游记	
1987	—N/a	回流	
1989	Living Buddha Ji Gong	活佛济公	
1989	—N/a	春阿氏	
1991	On the border	边城传奇	
1993	Zhu Yuanzhang	朱元璋	
1995	Xi Shi	西施	
1995	Sima Qian	司马迁	
1996	—N/a	武夷仙凡界	
2000	Journey to the West (Season 2)	西游记续集	

== Books ==
- 杨洁 (2013). 敢问路在何方 [Dare to Ask Where is the Road] (in Chinese). Suzhou, Jiangsu. pp. Jiangsu Literature and Arts Publishing House. ISBN 9787539957883.
- 杨洁自述：我的九九八十一难 [Yang Jie: My 81 Crises] (in Chinese). Beijing: Renmin University of China Press. 2014. ISBN 9787300183961.

== Lyric ==
- "Feminine Emotional" (女儿情)
