= Journey to the West (1986 TV series) =

Chinese television series

- Promotional poster

Chinese name
- Traditional Chinese: 西遊記
- Simplified Chinese: 西游记
Transcriptions
Standard Mandarin
- Hanyu Pinyin: Xī Yóu Jì
- Genre: Chinese mythology; shenmo; fantasy; adventure
- Based on: Journey to the West by Wu Cheng'en
- Screenplay by: Dai Yinglu; Zou Yiqing; Yang Jie
- Directed by: Yang Jie; Xun Hao; Ren Fengpo
- Starring: Liu Xiao Ling Tong; Chi Chongrui; Ma Dehua; Yan Huaili; Xu Shaohua; Cui Jingfu; Liu Dagang
- Theme music composer: Xu Jingqing; Yao Ming
- Opening theme: Immortal Sound Above Cloud Palace; The Path to Heaven is Wide
- Ending theme: Dare to Ask Where is the Road
- Composers: Xu Jingqing; Yao Ming
- Country of origin: China
- Original language: Mandarin
- No. of seasons: 2
- No. of episodes: 41 (40 on the YouTube release)

Production
- Executive producers: Wang Feng; Ruan Ruolin
- Producer: Yang Jie
- Production locations: China; Thailand
- Cinematography: Wang Chongqiu
- Running time: 40–62 minutes (45 on the YouTube release)
- Production companies: CCTV; China Television Production Center; China Railway 11th Bureau Group

Original release
- Network: CCTV
- Release: 1 October 1982 – 28 January 2000

Related
- Wu Cheng'en and Journey to the West

Journey to the West is a Chinese television series adapted from Wu Cheng'en's 16th-century novel of the same name. It was directed by Yang Jie and stars Liu Xiao Ling Tong as Sun Wukong, Chi Chongrui as Tang Sanzang, Ma Dehua as Zhu Bajie, and Yan Huaili as Sha Wujing.

The pilot first aired in Mainland China in 1982. Eleven completed episodes were released on 1 October 1986 before all 25 episodes were collectively broadcast on CCTV in 1988. A second season totaling 16 episodes was filmed in 1998. The series concluded in 2000 with 41 episodes broadcast over two seasons.

Set in Tang-era China, Journey to the West follows the journey of Chinese Buddhist monk Tang Sanzang and his three disciples, Sun Wukong, Zhu Bajie, and Sha Wujing on their pilgrimage to India. The series incorporates elements of Chinese mythology as well as Chinese Buddhism and Taoism.

Journey to the West attracted record viewership in China and gained national widespread popularity upon its release. It has been praised for staying faithful to the novel and its opening and ending themes have become iconic tunes in the public consciousness. In 1988, the show received a Feitian Award (Outstanding Artistry) and two Golden Eagle Awards (Best Television Series and Best Actor).

== Premise ==
Buddhist monk Tang Sanzang embarks on a holy pilgrimage to India seeking out and bringing back to China Buddhist scriptures. He is accompanied by three powerful disciples: Sun Wukong, a shapeshifting stone monkey and trickster who rebelled against Heaven; Zhu Bajie, a former Marshal Canopy of Heaven expelled for harassing the moon goddess Chang'e and subsequently reincarnated as a humanoid pig; and Sha Wujing, a former Curtain-Lifting General in Heaven expelled for breaking a valuable vase and reincarnated as a man-eating monster. Along their journey, the four pilgrims face 81 tribulations, some of which involve affairs of normal humans, whilst others consist of the disciples protecting their master from various demons and monsters who wish to consume Tang Sanzang's flesh in hopes of gaining immortality.

== Episodes ==
=== Season 1 ===
No. overall	No. in series	English Title	Chinese Title	Chapters Covered	Runtime (minutes)	Original air date
1	1	Birth of the Monkey King	猴王初问世	1-2	40	February 9, 1986
A monkey bursts from within a slab of stone and becomes the leader of a group of monkeys in Flower Fruit Mountain. When an old monkey dies, the stone monkey learns of mortality. He comes under the tutelage of the sage Puti Zushi, who christens him as Sun Wukong and passes onto him the secrets of immortality, 72 earthly transformations, and the Somersault Cloud.
2	2	Becoming a Horse-keeper	官封弼马温	2-4	44	February 10, 1986
Sun Wukong meets with the Dragon King from whom he acquires the weapon the Ruyi Jingu Bang. His happiness is short-lived however, as his soul is reaped by King Yama. Incensed, Wukong removes his name as well as all those belonging to primates from the Register of Life and Death. His actions are reported to the Jade Emperor, who has Taibai Jinxing trick Wukong into accepting the lowly rank of horse-keeper where he can be closely monitored by the Celestial Court.
3	3	Havoc in Heaven	大圣闹天宫	4-7	57	February 11, 1986
An army of heavenly soldiers led by Pagoda-Bearing Heavenly King Li lays siege to Flower Fruit Mountain but are easily repelled by Wukong. He is convinced by Taibai Jinxing that Heaven has conceded and recognised his new rank, and he is placed in charge of the Immortal Peach Garden in preparation for the Immortal Peach Banquet. However, Wukong is enraged when he learns he has not been invited and consumes everything at the banquet before it begins. A furious Jade Emperor, aided by Guanyin and Erlang Shen, sends another army down to apprehend Wukong.
4	4	Imprisonment in Five Elements Mountain	困囚五行山	7-9, 12-13	41	February 12, 1986
Wukong is challenged by the Gautama Buddha to a bet that if he is able to somersault out of the Buddha's palm, the Jade Emperor's throne will be ceded to him. Wukong accepts but ultimately fails and is imprisoned beneath Buddha's hand, which turns into the Five Elements Mountain. 500 years later, Guanyin is tasked in searching for someone pure of heart in the Tang empire to embark on holy pilgrimage to retrieve Buddhist sutras. En route, she visits the imprisoned Wukong and tells him to await a monk who will soon arrive to free him and that in return, Wukong is to accompany him on his journey to India. Guanyin eventually selects the monk Tang Sanzang and bequeaths him with many holy artefacts, including a kasaya, on his journey west.
5	5	The Monkey King Guards Tang Sanzang	猴王保唐僧	13-15	51	February 16, 1986
Tang Sanzang frees the imprisoned Wukong and the two begin their pilgrimage to India. When Wukong kills a group of attacking bandits, he is admonished by his horrified master. To control Wukong, Guanyin has Tang Sanzang gift him a golden headband that tightens when he utters a sutra, causing Wukong immense pain and curbing his violent tendencies.
6	6	Trouble in Guanyin Temple	祸起观音院	16-17	42	February 21, 1985
Wukong and Tang Sanzang arrive at the Guanyin Temple where its vain and greedy abbot Jinchi, vying for their prized kasaya, conspires to burn them to death. When the kasaya is then stolen by a monster called the Black Wind Demon, Wukong is aided by Guanyin in retrieving it.
7	7	The Recruitment of Zhu Bajie	计收猪八戒	18-19	51	February 8, 1984
Whilst on their journey, Wukong and Tang Sanzang meet Squire Gao from Gao Village whose daughter has been kidnapped by a pig demon.
8	8	Facing Three Adversities	坎途逢三难	20-24	49	March 1, 1986
The pilgrims are besieged by a creature called the Yellow Wind Demon whose Samadhi Wind blinds Wukong and can only be subdued by the Lingji bodhisattva. Then, while crossing the Flowing Sand River, Tang Sanzang is attacked by a ferocious man-eating demon. Efforts to subdue it appear futile until Guanyin's disciple Muzha appears and reveals the demon as the final disciple to accompany Tang on his journey. Finally, the pilgrims’ moral characters are tested when Lishan Laomu, Guanyin, Samantabhadra and Manjushri turn into beautiful women and propose the pilgrims marry them, promising a vast inheritance.
9	9	Stealing the Ginseng Fruit	偷吃人蔘果	24-26	51	February 14, 1983
At Longevity Mountain, the pilgrims are offered infant-shaped fruits from the Ginseng Tree which grant mortals 47,000 years of life, but a horrified Tang Sanzang refuses having mistaken them as real infants. When Wukong takes three and shares them with Bajie and Wujing, they are subsequently accused of stealing the fruits, causing an incensed Wukong to topple the tree.
10	10	Three Battles with the White Bone Demon	三打白骨精	27	48	February 8, 1984
A demoness known as the White Bone Demon succeeds in driving a wedge between Wukong and Tang Sanzang by turning herself into an elderly couple and their daughter on three occasions under the guise of offering them food. Her true form is seen through by Wukong, who kills the demon but he is banished by his master in the belief he has murdered an innocent family.
11	11	Instigating the Handsome Monkey King	智激美猴王	28-31	52	March 2, 1986
Without Wukong, Tang Sanzang is captured by the Yellow Robe Demon whose underling reveals the truth behind the White Bone Demon's ploy. Unable to best the demon, a desperate Bajie goes to Flower Fruit Mountain to seek out Wukong and convince him to come to their master's aid.
12	12	Treasure Plundering Lotus Cave	夺宝莲花洞	32-35	51	February 8, 1988
The pilgrims face a pair of demon kings, Gold Horn and Silver Horn, revealed to be the attendants under Taishang Laojun but who have escaped to the mortal realm after stealing their master's sacred treasures.
13	13	Slaying Demons in the Kingdom of Wuji	除妖乌鸡国	36-39	58	October 1, 1982
In Wuji Kingdom, Tang Sanzang sees an apparition claiming to be its true king and who was murdered and his identity stolen by a demon Daoist. Note: Original 1982 pilot.
14	14	Battling Red Boy	大战红孩儿	40-42	42	February 2, 1988
On their journey, the pilgrims save a seemingly innocent child who turns out to be Red Boy, the son of the Bull Demon King and whose ability to use the inextinguishable Samadhi Flames makes him a deadly adversary for Wukong, Bajie and Wujing.
15	15	Defeating Three Demons in a Contest of Mystic Might	斗法降三怪	44-46	59	February 20, 1988
The pilgrims are challenged by three powerful Daoist masters in the kingdom of Chechi to determine which religion, Buddhism or Daoism, is the superior one.
16	16	Encounter in Women's Kingdom	趣经女儿国	53-55	59	February 27, 1988
The pilgrims arrive in a kingdom comprising completely of women where its queen falls in love with Tang Sanzang and offers him her hand in marriage.
17	17	Three Attempts in Taking the Palm Leaf Fan	三调芭蕉扇	59-61	50	March 5, 1988
While crossing the scorched deserts of the Flaming Mountains, Wukong learns its flames can only be extinguished by the Palm Leaf fan, a sacred treasure of Taishang Laojun. Unfortunately, its owners are the parents of Red Boy with whom Wukong's relations have soured after he subdued their son.
18	18	Cleaning the Tower and Redressing a Grievance	扫塔辨奇冤	62-63	54	March 12, 1988
When the Nine-headed Bug and dragon princess Wanshou steal the sacred Buddhist orb of Jisai Kingdom, the monks there are blamed and their brutal treatment by its king witnessed by the pilgrims. Wukong, with the aid of Bajie and the White Dragon Horse, vow to return the treasure and restore the monks’ innocence.
19	19	Mistakenly Entering Little ThunderclapTemple	误入小雷音	64-66	55	March 19, 1988
Tang Sanzang believes their journey is at an end when he sees the Gautama Buddha and his five hundred Arhats at Little Thunderclap Temple. However, they are revealed to be demons masquerading as deities led by Yellow Brow, a former disciple of Maitreya.
20	20	The Monkey King Becomes a Physician	孙猴巧行医	68-71	56	March 26, 1988
Whilst in Zhuzi Kingdom, the pilgrims learn its king has taken ill, prompting Wukong to take on the guise of a physician to cure him, much to the chagrin of his master.
21	21	Ensnared in the Spiders' Cave	错坠盘丝洞	72-73	57	April 2, 1988
Tang Sanzang seeks alms from seven seemingly innocent young women, who are revealed to be seven spider demons and he is captured in their lair.
22	22	Four Visits to the Abyss Cave	四探无底洞	80-83	62	April 9, 1988
Upon freeing a captured young woman, Tang Sanzang allows her to temporarily join them and they seek shelter at a temple that night. When a series of gruesome murders occur, Wukong disguises himself as a young monk in hopes of luring out the culprit.
23	23	Teaching in Yuhua State	传艺玉华州	84-85, 88-90	59	April 16, 1988
The pilgrims disguise themselves in Yuhua State as its ruler has decreed that all monks be banished. Wukong shaves the heads of its king and his subjects, throwing the court into a panic that brings them to their senses.
24	24	Subduing the Jade Rabbit in India	天竺收玉兔	93-95	46	April 23, 1988
The pilgrims arrive at last in India whereupon they witness an elaborate entourage of its princess who selects Tang Sanzang to be her betrothed.
25	25	Arrival in Paradise	波生极乐天	98-100	50	April 30, 1988
The pilgrims reach Vulture Peak and their journey is seemingly at an end as they receive the Buddhist scriptures from the Gautama Buddha.

=== Season 2 ===
Due to budgetary issues, five of the initially planned episodes were not filmed during the first season:

1. Dangerous Crossing at Heaven Reaching River (险渡通天河), covering chapters 47-49
2. Capturing the Azure Bull Demon (收伏青牛怪), covering chapters 50-52
3. The Real and Imposter Handsome Monkey King (真假美猴王), covering chapters 56-58
4. Obstacle at Lion Camel Ridge (遇阻狮驼岭), covering chapters 74-77
5. Rescuing Children in Xiaoer City (救难小儿城), covering chapters 78–79

No. overall	No. in series	Translated title in English	Original title in Chinese	Based on chapter(s) of novel	Runtime in minutes	Original air date
26	1	Dangerous Crossing at Heaven Reaching River	险渡通天河	47-48	43	January 28, 2000
When receiving alms from the Chen family at Heaven Reaching River, the pilgrims see a funeral alter set up for the still-living infant son and learn that he is a human sacrifice to their guardian deity, who demands a yearly offering of a son and daughter in return for its protection.
27	2	A Rift Between Master and Disciple	师徒生二心	49, 56-58	44	January 28, 2000
When Wukong kills a group of bandits intent on robbing them, he is admonished by his master for his cruelty. Wukong is driven away and Bajie and Wujing later find their master unconscious and injured while their belongings are nowhere to be found. They are in disbelief when Sanzang reveals it was Wukong who attacked him. Wujing later locates Wukong at Flower Fruit Mountain, the latter claiming he plans on retrieving the Buddhist scriptures himself and attacks him. Wujing flees to Guanyin, only to find Wukong already there and who fiercely rebukes Wujing's accusations of attacking their master, surmising it must be an imposter.
28	3	The Real and Imposter Handsome Monkey King	真假美猴王	58	44	January 28, 2000
Wujing and Wukong return to Flower Fruit Mountain and confront the imposter Wukong whereupon a fight begins between the two Monkey Kings. Attempts to discern the true Wukong from the fake prove difficult, as not even Guanyin nor the Celestial Court can distinguish them. In desperation, the two Wukongs turn to the Gautama Buddha at Vulture Peak.
29	4	Obstacle at Lion Camel Ridge	受阻狮驼岭	58, 74	44	January 28, 2000
The pilgrims arrive at Lion Camel Ridge, a dangerous dominion ruled by three powerful demons: the Blue Lion, the White Elephant, and the Golden-Winged Great Peng. Wukong disguises himself as an underling and investigates the demons’ lair. In his absence, Tang Sanzang is approached by a young woman offering him shelter but who later abducts him, revealing herself to be the peacock princess and a descendant of Mahamayuri. Believing her to be an ally of the three demon kings, Bajie joins Wukong in confronting the Blue Lion demon until it turns into its true form and swallows Wukong whole.
30	5	Meeting Immortals at Peacock Platform	遇仙孔雀台	75-76	44	January 28, 2000
Wukong torments the Blue Lion from inside his stomach demanding him to return his master. Meanwhile, Tang Sanzang and the peacock princess are both abducted by the Golden-Winged Great Peng, who launches a subsequent counterattack on Tang's three disciples.
31	6	Buddha Captures the Great Peng	如来收大鹏	77, 43	44	January 28, 2000
Upon learning the Great Peng is the spiritual uncle of the Gautama Buddha, Wukong goes to Vulture Peak seeking the latter's help.
32	7	Heartbreak at Black Water River	情断黑水河	43, 10	44	January 28, 2000
When crossing Black Water River, Tang Sanzang ignores Wukong's warning of a suspicious boatsman, the guise of the demon residing there, and he and Bajie are captured. Wukong learns the demon is in fact, one of the sons of a dragon king who, unwilling to lose a bet to a fortune-teller, deliberately defied the Jade Emperor's decree, resulting in his execution.
33	8	Capturing the Azure Bull Demon	收伏青牛怪	50-51	44	January 28, 2000
While Wukong goes into search of alms, Bajie retrieves some clothes from an abandoned household and presents them to his master. The moment they put them on however, the clothes turn into ropes that incapacitate them and are revealed to have been a trap set up by the Azure Bull Demon, who subsequently captures them. Wukong's attempt to free them are unsuccessful when his Jingu Bang is snatched up by a metallic ring wielded by the demon.
34	9	Praying for Rain in Phoenix Immortal Prefecture	祈雨凤仙郡	52, 87	44	January 28, 2000
The pilgrims chance upon the desolate Phoenix Immortal Prefecture which has not seen rain in three years. Wukong learns that the ongoing drought is the result of a punishment ordered by the Jade Emperor, who took great offence to the prefect for upturning an offering altar to him three years prior.
35	10	Wreaking Havoc in Fragrance Hall	大闹披香殿	87, 67	44	January 28, 2000
Wukong and Bajie take matters into their own hands when they learn that rain will only fall in Phoenix Immortal Prefecture when three near-impossible tasks are completed in the Celestial Court: a mountain of rice that is to be eaten grain by grain by a single rooster, a mountain of flour that is to be lapped up by a single small dog, and a large metal lock held up by a chain that is to be burned through by the flame of a single candle.
36	11	A Dead End Becomes the Way	绝域变通途	67, 86	44	January 28, 2000
The pilgrims arrive at a small village terrorised by an unknown demon that has been abducting its young inhabitants. Wukong, Bajie and Wujing agree to help protect the villagers and locate the missing people.
37	12	Shedding Tears on Hidden Misty Mountain	泪洒隐雾山	86, 78	44	January 8, 2000
Whilst crossing a mountain range covered in black fog, Bajie believes it is the result of smoke from nearby households and goes for alms, only to find it is in actuality a den of feline demons ruled by a powerful leopard demon king.
38	13	Rescuing Children in Xiaoer City	救难小儿城	78-79	44	January 28, 2000
The pilgrims save a young child from a group of soldiers and upon arriving at the nearby city, see hundreds of children hung in cages lining the streets. Tang Sanzang is horrified to learn the reason why: the sickly king plans to harvest 1,111 children's hearts as medicinal ingredients.
39	14	Subduing Bandits in the Land of Bodhi	缉盗菩提域	79, 88, 96-97	44	January 28, 2000
In India, the pilgrims are warmly received by the elderly Benefactor Kou as their arrival marks them the 10,000th number of monks to be taken in by his estate. As the pilgrims continue on their journey, they are attacked by bandits and upon subduing them, discover on their person several items belonging to Benefactor Kou. When Tang Sanzang goes to return the items however, he and his disciples are apprehended by the local constable whereupon they learn Kou was murdered, with his family accusing the four monks of the murder.
40	15	Returning the Soul of Benefactor Kou	还魂寇善人	96-97	44	January 28, 2000
The trial against Tang Sanzang and his disciples commences but with Wukong secretly meddling, things continuously go awry resulting in its postponement and the pilgrims' imprisonment. With his master safe from physical harm, Wukong enters the Underworld to retrieve Benefactor Kou's soul and restore it to his mortal body.
41	16	Admiring Lanterns in Jinping Prefecture	观灯金平府	91-92	43	January 28, 2000
In the prefecture of Jinping, the pilgrims’ arrival coincides with the annual lantern festival. When Tang Sanzang hears it will herald the arrival of celestial deities, he goes to offer his prayer but the deities turn out to be three rhinoceros demons that subsequently abduct him.

== Cast ==
Some of the actors played multiple roles while certain roles were played by multiple actors

=== Season 1 ===
==== Main cast ====
- Liu Xiao Ling Tong as Sun Wukong
- Wang Yue (episodes 6, 9, 10), Xu Shaohua (episodes 4, 5, 7, 8, 11, 12, 14-16), Chi Chongrui (episodes 13, 17-25) as Tang Sanzang
- Ma Dehua as Zhu Bajie
- Yan Huaili as Sha Wujing

==== Other cast ====
Listed in order of appearance

- Guan Yunjie as Puti Zhushi
- Xiang Han as Horse Monkey
- Ma Dehua as White Haired Monkey
- Xiong Ni as Monkey
- Zhang Yushan as Jade Emperor
- Yan Huaili as Thousand Li Eye
- Xiang Han as Wind Following Ear
- Li Yonggui as Old shopkeeper
- Li Lianyi as Official
- Wang Zhongxin as Taibai Jinxing
- Wang Yuli as Li Jing
- Xiang Han as Fishmonger
- Yan Huaili as Old man
- Bai Chunxiang as Servant boy
- Li Xijing as Dragon King of the East Sea
- Liu Jiang as King Yama
- Wang Zhishan as Wuqu Xingjun
- Lin Zhiqian as Demon King of Chaos
- Han Shanxu as Single Horned Devil King
- Yan Huaili, Wang Futang as Bull Demon King
- Qian Yongkang as Juling Shen
- Yan Huaili as Official
- Zhang Jidie as Official
- Xiang Han and Li Jiancheng as Black and White Guards of Impermanence
- Ai Jinmei, Yang Bin as Nezha
- Zheng Rong, Yan Huaili as Taishang Laojun
- Lin Zhiqian as Erlang Shen
- Zhu Bingqian as Taiyi Zhenren
- Zuo Dabin as Guanyin
- Guo Wei, Ren Fengpo as Lingji Bodhisattva
- Zhao Quan, Ye Yimeng as Manjusri
- Chi Zhaopeng, Guo Wei, Jin Genxu as Samantabhadra
- An Yunwu, Li Runsheng and Yang Yuzhang as Fu Lu Shou
- Wu Guiling as Immortal Zhenyuan
- Kong Rui, Xiang Han as Earth Deity
- Wang Xueqin, Zhang Yanyan as Seventh Fairy
- Zhang Jingdi as Immortal Crane
- Wan Fuxiang as Queen Mother of the West
- Han Shanxu, Jin Genxu as Barefoot Immortal
- Xu Qing as Red Dress Boy
- Xiang Han as Ananda
- Li Jiancheng as Mahākāśyapa
- Ma Ling as Dancing fairy
- Zhang Zhiming as Emperor Taizong of Tang
- Guo Jiaqing as Guanyin's incarnation
- Xu Shaohua as Chen Guangrui
- Ma Lan as Miss Yin
- Han Shanxu as Liu Hong
- Li Jiancheng as Teahouse keeper
- Zhu Longguang as Buddha
- Qiu Peining as Chang'e
- Wang Bozhao as White Dragon Horse
- Yan Huaili as Dragon King of the West Sea
- Li Longbin, Yu Weijie as Nine Headed Bug
- Han Shanxu as Old man
- He Yi as Boy
- Xu Chuan as Liu Boqin
- Xiang Han, Ma Dehua, Yang Bin, He Yi, Li Runsheng, Li Lianyi as robbers
- Cheng Zhi as Jinchi Elder
- Li Yonggui as Monk Guangzhi
- Xiang Han as Black Wind Demon
- Lin Zhiqian as Virapaksa
- Cheng Weibing as Lingxuzi
- Kong Rui as Squire Gao
- Gao Yuqian as Mrs Gao
- Wei Huili as Squire Gao's daughter
- Xiang Han as Gao Cai
- Zhang Jidie as Dibao
- Xiang Ling as Maid
- Sun Fengqin as Lishan Laomu
- Guo Jiaqing as Yellow Wind Demon
- Shen Huifen as Zhenzhen
- Yang Fengyi as Ai'ai
- He Jing as Lianlian
- Ren Fengpo as Lingji Bodhisattva
- Yang Bin as Muzha
- Xu Ye as Fairy
- Zhang Jidie as Tiger Vanguard
- Cai Lin as Qingfeng
- Wang Yang as Mingyue
- Yang Qingxia as White Bone Demoness
- Huang Fei as Old man
- Liu Huimin as Old woman
- Yang Jun as Village woman
- Li Hongchang as Black Fox Demon
- Li Lianyi as Skeleton Demon
- Ren Fengpo as Yellow Robe Demon
- Gu Lan as King of Baoxiang
- Liu Bing as Baihuaxiu
- Li Hongchang as Black Fox Demon
- Han Fengxia as Black Fox Demon (transformation)
- Yang Shubiao as Yellow Robe Demon (transformation)
- Ren Wenjian as White Dragon Horse (transformation)
- Yang Shubiao as Wood Wolf of Legs
- Che Xiaotong as Golden Horned King
- Guo Shouyang as Silver Horned King
- Liu Xiao Ling Tong as Priest
- Li Jiancheng as Meticulous Devil
- Ji Fuji as Intelligent Bug
- Liu Xiao Ling Tong as Nine Tailed Vixen
- Ma Dehua as Mountain Deity
- Lei Ming as King of Wuji
- Xiang Mei as Queen of Wuji
- Wang Haining as Crown prince of Wuji
- Zhao Guangshan as Monk
- Chi Chongrui as Dragon King of the well
- Teng Teng as Servant boy
- Dong Honglin as Evil priest
- Li Jiancheng as Evil eunuch
- Zhao Xinpei as Red Boy
- Xiang Han and Xu Tinglei as Earth deities
- Li Jiancheng, Li Anjian, Zhang Ziyue as Mountain deities
- Xu Shaohua as Dragon King
- Zhao Yuxiu as King of Chechi
- Zhao Lirong as Queen of Chechi
- Liu Qin as Tiger Power Immortal
- Zeng Ge as Deer Power Immortal
- Cai Yuge as Antelope Power Immortal
- Jin Genxu and Xu Tinglei as Priests
- Liu Xiao Ling Tong as Yunshui Quanzhen
- Zhu Lin as Ruler of Women's Kingdom
- Yang Guixiang as Royal Adviser of Women's Kingdom
- Li Yunjuan as Pipa Lady
- Wang Delin as Immortal Ruyi
- Xu Guanchun as Sun Rooster of Hairy Head
- Wang Fengxia as Princess Iron Fan
- Zheng Yiping as Jade Faced Vixen
- Ji You as Earth deity
- Zhang Qing as Princess of Jisai
- Zhao Baocai as Dragon King
- Jin Gang as King of Jisai
- Li Fengchun as Old monk
- Li Zhiyi as Old abbot
- Tian Jiangshui, Bai Jiancai and Gao Jifeng as Monks
- Li Jiancheng as Benbo'erba
- Gao Baozhong as Babo'erben
- Ma Dehua, Yu Hong as Ambassadors
- Cao Duo as Yellow Brows Great King
- Wang Linghua as Almond Immortal (Apricot Fairy)
- Tie Niu as Maitreya
- Cao Duo as Guzhi Gong
- Ye Bing as Jinjie Shiba Gong
- Li Tiefeng as Fuyun Sou
- Ye Yimeng as Lingkongzi
- Tie Niu as Kangua Laoren
- Li Jinshui as Ghost messenger
- Gong Ming as King of Zhuzi
- Zhan Pingping as Lady of Jinsheng Palace
- Wang Ren as Tai Sui Equivalent
- Zhou Caili as Youlai Youqu
- Shi Chongren as Old eunuch
- Han Tao as Immortal Ziyang
- Ni Fuquan as Physician
- Li Jianliang as Minister
- Yao Jia as First Spider Demoness
- Liu Qian as Second Spider Demoness
- Du Xianghui as Third Spider Demoness
- Yang Su as Fourth Spider Demoness
- Azhi Shima as Fifth Spider Demoness
- Lü Haiyu as Sixth Spider Demoness
- Liu Lin as Seventh Spider Demoness
- Li Hongchang as Hundred Eyed Demon Lord
- Yang Qimin as Pilanpo Bodhisattva
- Li Enqi as Lishan Laomu incarnation
- Yang Bin as Priest
- Chang Qing as Albino rat
- Wang Jie and Li Zhixiong as Monks
- Wu Tang as Supervisor
- Yu Xuemei and Jiang Xiuhua as Demon girls
- Nige Mutu as King of Yuhua
- Zhang Yang as First Prince of Yuhua
- Ye Yimeng as Second Prince of Yuhua
- Yang Bin as Third Prince of Yuhua
- Gong Ming as Wang Xiao'er
- Qu Yinglian as Wang Xiao'er's wife
- Chen Qingping as Zhao's mother
- Yang Yumin as Queen
- Xiang Han as Tawny Lion Demon
- Li Jiancheng as Nine Headed Lion
- Sha Jie as Diaozhuan Guguai
- He Yi as Guguai Diaozhuan
- Zhu Bingqian as Taiyi Zhenren
- Xiang Han and Li Hongchang as Merchants
- Li Lingyu as Jade Rabbit
- Wang Tong as King of India
- Ren Fengpo as Old monk
- Yu Hong as Queen of India
- Wang Xizhong as Golden Peak Immortal
- Li Hongchang as Boatman
- He Chengfu as Long Brows Arhat
- Li Yang as Dapeng Zunzhe

=== Season 2 ===
==== Main cast ====
- Liu Xiao Ling Tong as Sun Wukong
- Xu Shaohua, Chi Chongrui as Tang Sanzang
- Cui Jingfu as Zhu Bajie
- Liu Dagang as Sha Wujing

==== Other cast ====
Listed in order of appearance

- Zhang Zhiming as Emperor Taizong of Tang
- Zheng Rong as Taishang Laojun
- Liu Jiang as King Yama
- Zhu Longguang as Buddha
- Wang Zhongxin as Taibai Jinxing
- Zhang Wankun as Chen Qing
- Zhang Wenhui as Chen Qing's wife
- Li Qingyou as Housekeeper
- Liu Lifeng as Xiaoguanbao
- Hou Lei as Yipengjin
- Wang Limin as King of Spiritual Touch
- Ji Yu as Fish Woman
- Lan Faqing as Great White Turtle
- Zhang Fen as Muzha
- Zhang Ziqiang as Old man
- Zhang Xueqin as Old man's wife
- Guan Xiaoyu as Old man's son
- Yang Xingyi as Old man's daughter-in-law
- Jiang Baohong as Chief robber
- Liu Xiao Ling Tong as Six-Eared Macaque
- Jiang Hongbao as Horse Monkey
- Wang Weiguo as Jade Emperor
- Cui Jingfu, Wu Zhiyong as Dragon King of the East Sea
- Liu Dagang as Diting
- Jia Shitou as Azure Lion King
- Wang Weiguo as Yellow Toothed Elephant
- Guo Jun as Golden Winged Great Peng
- Jin Qiaoqiao as peacock princess
- Lan Jiafu as Xiaozhuanfeng
- Zhu Dan as Xique
- Liu Dagang as Dragon King of the North Sea
- An Yaping as Water Dragon
- Yang Jing as Princess of Black River
- Cao Rong as Crown Prince Mo'ang
- Li Hongtao as Dragon King of Jing River
- Zhou Zheng as Yuan Shoucheng
- Chi Guodong as Dragon King of the West Sea
- Li Hongchang as Fisherman
- Ge Zhixing as Deity of Black River
- Ni Fuquan as Earth Deity of Mount Golden Bull
- Li Hongtao as Rhinoceros King
- Chen Zhongsheng as Li Jing
- Zhu Qin, Wang Wei as Nezha
- Ding Jian as Fire Star
- Ma Yongzeng as Water Star
- Wang Hui, Zhang Wei, Zhao Shunzeng and Sun Jifeng as Four Heavenly Masters
- Wen Xiang as Servant boy
- Tan Feiling as Marquis of Fengxian
- Ni Fuquan as Earth Deity of Fengxian
- Jin Liuyi as Old man from Fengxian
- Di Yuerong as Wife of Marquis of Fengxian
- Wu Suying as Village woman from Fengxian
- Xue Yongliang as Man from Fengxian
- Sha Lin as Wind Deity
- Zhang Dandan as Lightning Deity
- Yang Zichun as Old man Li
- Xue Chunyu as Old man Li's wife
- Zhang Pingsheng as Old man Li's son
- Bo Hong as Red Scaled Python
- Zheng Ying as Woodcutter's wife
- Wu Zhiyong as Leopard Demon
- Lan Faqing as Wolf Demon
- Yu Wanling as Old woman
- Li Hongchang as Official from the Kingdom of Biqiu
- Wang Ying as King of Biqiu
- Yu Meng as Vixen spirit
- Liu Jin as Deer Spirit
- Qiu Yongli as Evil priest
- Xu Jiansheng as Guard from the Kingdom of Biqiu
- Cai Guangqing as Squire Kou
- Wang Meihong as Second Madam
- Wang Xia as Zhu Liya
- Shu Xin as Wosi
- Chen Jian as Housekeeper
- Zhang Kunwu as Hui'er
- Huang Zongluo as Official of Tongtai
- Li Xiaobo as Civil official
- Zhong Changde as Abbot of Jinping
- Chen Dazhong as King of Cold Protection
- Zhao Yi as King of Heat Protection
- Cai Yuge as King of Dust Protection
- Liu Dan as Dragon Girl of the West Sea
- Lan Faqing as Wood Dragon of Horn
- Jiang Baohong as Wood Insect of Dipper
- Xu Jiansheng as Wood Wolf of Legs
- Li Canwen as Wood Dog of Well

== Production ==
=== Development ===
Journey to the West was greenlit in late 1981 as part of reformist leader Hu Yaobang's efforts to dramatise Chinese literary classics on state-run television. Yang Jie was appointed director of the series in 1982 and developed the screenplay with Dai Yinglu and Sou Yiping. Yang sought to explore the humanity of the original novel's characters and so focused on the complexities of interpersonal relationships between them in preference to focusing on action sequences. A major difference from the novel was the depiction of Tang Sanzang having his faith challenged after the queen of Women's Kingdom develops romantic feelings for him and he is, in turn, tempted to give into mortal desire.

Due to a shortage of staff, Yang largely managed the series’ budgeting, financing, scouting, writing, editing and casting. She insisted on filming on location instead of a sound stage and spent months searching across China for suitable locations. In preparation for the stunt work required of the actors, she and her husband Wang Chongqiu also studied wire work in Hong Kong.

=== Casting ===
Initial casting for the characters, notably the role of Sun Wukong, proved difficult as the production team had no points of reference to base off of in modern media. Peking opera was ultimately selected due to its history and artistry in depicting various characters and tales from Chinese folklore, which codirector Xun Hao perceived as an important foundation and reference point for the writing of Sun Wukong's character, as well as for capturing his appearance and mannerisms that felt familiar to a Chinese audience. As a result, a majority of the cast hailed with a background in Peking opera and elements of the genre, such as pantomiming, were incorporated into their scenes.

Performing artist Liu Xiao Ling Tong, who hailed from a family of performers specializing in portraying Sun Wukong, was cast in the role after Yang Jie requested to see a private demonstration in Beijing. His speaking voice was dubbed by Li Shihong from episodes one to five in season one and by Li Yang for the remainder of both seasons.

Wang Yue was cast as Tang Sanzang and filmed four episodes before leaving mid-production to pursue a film career. He was replaced by Xu Shaohua who departed soon after filming the episode Encounter in Women's Kingdom, to pursue university in Shandong. Peking opera singer Chi Chongrui took on the role for the remainder of the first season and had been recruited by chance after being spotted by Yang Jie while passing each other in a corridor. Both Xu and Chi would return in season two, sharing the role for eight episodes each between them. The voice of Tang Sanzang was dubbed by Zhang Yunming.

Ma Dehua was cast as Zhu Bajie and Yan Huaili as Sha Wujing. Both were replaced in season two by Cui Jingfu and Liu Dagang respectively. Zhao Guangshan and Li Po provided the dubbed voice of Zhu Bajie, while Yan Huaili and Qi Kejian provided the dubbed voice of Sha Wujing.

Several horses were used for Tang's steed White Dragon Horse before a four-year-old white Ujumqin was purchased from Inner Mongolia in 1983.

=== Filming ===
Filming began on 3 July 1982 with the entirety of season one being shot on a single Sony BVP-300 model camera. On location shooting took place across various provinces and cities in China including Beijing, Guizhou, Jiangsu, Sichuan, and Xinjiang, while episodes depicting India were completed in Thailand. Various underwater scenes and those depicting Heaven were shot at a sound stage, with dry ice being used to imitate the effects of clouds. The first season's episodes were not shot in chronological order, with episode 13 Slaying Demons in the Kingdom of Wuji being completed first followed by episodes 9, 1, 6, and 10. Slaying Demons in the Kingdom of Wuji was broadcast as a pilot on National Day of 1982 where it was poorly received by test audiences, who primarily criticised its crude makeup and cinematography while CCTV was also reportedly unhappy with Wang Yue's portrayal of Tang Sanzang. These resulted in extensive reshoots and editing which would not be complete until 1986 when the production team was satisfied with the episode.

To ensure the acrobatic elements of Peking opera did not detract from the realness of battle scenes, wushu practitioner Lin Zhiqian, who also portrayed Erlang Shen, provided most of the action choreography for season one. For season two, a stunt team from Hong Kong, headed by martial arts instructor Cao Rong, was hired.

Limited resources and poor logistical support caused several issues during season one's production process. Many actors were injured during airborne battle sequences as the wires used to suspend them frequently broke. To compensate, cardboard boxes and pillows were placed beneath the wires while young athletes from local sport schools were hired to perform stunts using trampolines for high angle shots. Due to the innate danger of using real flames, special effects were originally set to be used whilst filming Sun Wukong's imprisonment in Taishang Laojun's furnace as well as during his battle with Red Boy. However, Yang was dissatisfied with the poor quality of the effects resulting in pyrotechnics to be implemented. On Yang's insistence, the intensity of the flames were increased on both instances and nearly resulted in Liu Xiao Ling Tong suffering fatal injuries. The actor recalled that while filming the furnace scene, "the fire burned beyond the control of the technical staff" and the fur on his monkey suit was burned off, whilst the fire used in the battle scene, which required him to be set alight with nothing but cotton-padding in his costume, caused him to collapse from suffocation.

With individual scenes being shot on a single camera, a significant amount of time was required for the completion of a single episode, often needing three to four months. By 1986, the first fifteen episodes had accrued CCTV three million yuan in production costs resulting in funding to be pulled. Production was further interrupted when Yang Jie and the production team came under investigation by the network on suspicions they were squandering national funds. Season one was only able to be completed when supporting cast member Li Hongchang helped secure a three-million-yuan loan from the China Railway 11th Bureau Group. However, five of the planned 30 episodes remained unfinished and were adapted into a later season a decade later in 1998. Season two reportedly received thirteen million yuan in funds to film.

=== Music ===
Xu Jingqing was selected to be the series' main music composer in 1983 after Yang Jie heard a demo of "Happy Gathering at Flower Fruit Mountain". Xu used a combination of traditional Chinese instruments as well as a Yamaha DX7 synthesizer, a Yamaha RX-11 drum machine and a Simmons SDSV electronic drum to create most of the series' music, and has described the genre as a 'mix between Chinese traditional music, electronic music, and orchestral song'. At the time, his use of electronic music was perceived by the network as "Western" and "modern" and thus unfitting for an adaption of one of China's four great novels. It became such an issue of debate that Xu was almost fired during production. Prior his involvement with Journey to the West, two themes had been recorded and released in 1982 and 1984, with one titled "Swaying Clouds, Vast Seas" and the other “Thousands of Adversities Prove One's Sincerity". Yang, however, was dissatisfied with both songs and wanted a tune that better captured the four disciples' enduring fervor. The third and final theme, "Immortal Sound Above Cloud Palace" was drawn from Xu hearing a group of part-time workers humming and drumming their lunchboxes in tune, whilst tunes to the ending theme song "Dare to Ask Where is the Road" and several other songs used in the first season, including "Women's Feelings", were drawn from his personal life experiences. He also referenced the 1951 Indian film, Awaara, when composing the song "Tianzhu Maiden", used in episode 24 following the four disciples' arrival in India.

Yan Su and Yao Ming were the lead lyricists for season one and two respectively. While writing "Dare to Ask Where is the Road", Yan referenced novelist Lu Xun's 1921 short story "My Old Home", specifically its ending sentence 'For actually the earth had no roads to begin with, but when many men pass one way, a road is made' to complete the song. Zhang Baomo originally performed the song, her version being used for the first season's 11 episodes before it was rerecorded by folk singer Jiang Dawei. This new version would replace Zhang's for the remainder of the first season. A remixed version (still sung by Jiang) was used in season two.

== Soundtrack ==
=== Season 1 ===
All tracks were composed by Xu Jingqing except where stated.

#	Track title	Credits	Notes
1	西游记序曲 / 云宫迅音 (Journey to the West Opening Theme / Immortal Sound Above Cloud Palace)	Performed by the musical band of the Central Ballet Troupe; conducted by Hu Bingxu	The opening theme music played at the start of each episode
2	百曲千折显精诚 (Thousands of Adversities Prove One's Sincerity)	Composed by Wang Liping; lyrics by Wang Liping; performed by Wu Yanze	Opening theme of episodes 6, 7, and 10 during the 1984 run; replaced by the first track in the 1986 run.
3	云荡荡海茫茫 (Swaying Clouds, Vast Seas)	Composed by Zhang Fuquan; performed by Geng Qichang	Opening theme of episodes 9 and 13 during their release in 1982 and 1983; replaced by the first track in the 1986 run.
4	敢问路在何方 (Dare to Ask Where is the Road)	Lyrics by Yan Su; performed by Zhang Baomo / Jiang Dawei	Ending theme song; performed by Zhang Baomo during the initial runs in 1984 and 1986; performed by Jiang Dawei in the full 25 episodes run
5	生无名本无姓 (Born Without a Name, Naturally Without a Surname)	Lyrics by Fulin and Xiaoling; performed by Huang Xiaoqun	Insert song in episode 3; played during the 1986 run; later performed by Wang Xiaoqing
6	大圣歌 (Song of the Great Sage)	Lyrics by Yan Su; performed by Hu Yinyin	Insert song in episode 3, replaced the fourth track in the full 25 episodes run
7	他多想是棵小草 / 被贬五行山 (He Wished He Was a Blade of Grass / Trapped Under Five Elements Mountain)	Lyrics by Yan Su; performed by Ding Xiaoqing	Insert song in episode 4; played during the 1986 run
8	五百年桑田沧海 (500 Years of Great Changes)	Lyrics by Yan Su; performed by Yu Junjian	Insert song in episode 4; replaced the sixth track in the full 25 episodes run
9	走啊走 (Let's Go)	Lyrics by Yan Su; performed by Zhou Lifu / Li Jingxian	Insert song in episode 4; performed by Zhou Lifu in the 1986 run; performed by Li Jingxian in the full 25 episodes run
10	吹不散这点点愁 (Cannot Blow Away This Little Bit of Misery)	Lyrics by Yan Su, performed by Yu Junjian	Insert song in episode 10
11	女儿情 (Women's Feelings)	Lyrics by Yang Jie; performed by Wu Jing	Insert song in episode 16
12	相见难别亦难 (Meeting is Difficult, Parting Ways is Also Difficult)	Lyrics by Yan Su; performed by Wu Jing	Insert song in episode 16
13	晴空月儿明 (Clear Sky, Bright Moon)	Lyrics by Yan Su; performed by Chi Chongrui	Insert song in episode 18
14	何必西天万里遥 (Why Must the West Heaven be So Far Away)	Lyrics by Yan Su; performed by Wu Jing	Insert song in episode 19
15	天竺少女 (Tianzhu Maiden)	Lyrics by Yan Su; performed by Li Lingyu	Insert song in episode 24
16	青青菩提树 (Green Bodhi Tree)	Lyrics by Yan Su; performed by Li Jingxian	Insert song in episode 25
17	无底船歌 (Song of the Bottomless Boat)	Lyrics by Yan Su; performed by Ye Mao	Insert song in episode 25
18	取经归来 (Returning with the Scriptures)	Lyrics by Dai Yinglu; performed by Jiang Dawei	Insert song in episode 25
19	欢聚花果山 (Happy Gathering at Flower Fruit Mountain)		Insert song in episode 1
20	快乐花果山 (Joy in Flower Fruit Mountain)		Insert song in episode 1
21	逍遥自在的孙大圣 (The Carefree Great Sage Sun)	Lyrics by Yan Su; performed by Zhang Xu	Insert in episode 3
22	幽冥界 (The Underworld)		Insert song in episode 2
23	初进凌霄殿 (First Entrance into Lingxiao Hall)		Insert song in episode 2
24	官封弼马温 (Appointed Keeper of Horses)	Lyrics by Yan Su; performed by a children's choir	Used as a soundtrack in an earlier version of episode 2
25	嫦娥舞曲 (Chang'e's Dance Theme)		
26	大闹蟠桃会 (Causing Trouble at the Peach Feast)		
27	大战二郎神 (Fighting Erlang Shen)		
28	安天会 (Heaven Pacification Meeting)		
29	观音宝曲 (Guanyin's Theme)		
30	送别 (Farewell)		
31	状元巡街 (Top Scholar Parades Through the Streets)		
32	江流儿 (The River Flows)		
33	放生曲 (Release Theme)		
34	江月 (River and Moon)		
35	痴梦 (Delusional Dream)		
36	猪八戒背媳妇 (Zhu Bajie Carries his Spouse)		
37	猪八戒撞天婚 (Zhu Bajie's Marriage)		
38	偷吃人参果 (Stealing the Ginsengfruit)		
39	仙童骂战 (Argument Between Boys)		
40	公主打猎曲 (The Princess Goes Hunting Theme)		
41	云山雾海 (Clouded Mountains and Misty Seas)		
42	乌鸡遗恨 (Regret in Wuji)		
43	登坛作法 (Setting Up an Altar and Preparing for a Ritual)		
44	云台显圣 (Display of Power at Cloud Platform)		
45	鸳鸯梦 (Dream of the Mandarin Ducks)		
46	铁扇仙舞剑 (Princess Iron Fan's Sword Dance)		
47	风雨行路难 (A Road Hard to Travel)		

=== Season 2 ===
#	Track title	Credits	Notes
1	通天大道宽又阔 (The Path to Heaven is Wide)	Music and lyrics by Yao Ming; performed by Choi Kyung Ho / Clover	The main theme song
2	敢问路在何方 (Dare to Ask Where Is the Road)	Lyrics by Yan Su; performed by Jiang Dawei	The ending theme song
3	伴君常开花一朵 (By Your Side, A Flower Often Blossoms)	Music and lyrics by Yao Ming; performed by Pan Jun	Insert song
4	心中有路是坦途 (The Road in Your Heart is a Level Path)	Music by Xu Jingqing and lyrics by Yao Ming; performed by Chi Chongrui	Originally written as an insert song, but was replaced by Watch Me Ride My Horse and Wave My Whip in the final release.
5	留不住去也难 (Cannot Make You Stay, Leaving is Also Difficult)	Music by Xu Jingqing and lyrics by Yao Ming; performed by Li Shu	Originally written as an insert song, but was in the final release replaced by 就这样走 (Just Leave Like This) Music and lyrics by Yao Ming; performed by Chen Xiaotao.
6	庄严我神州大地 (The Dignity of Our Land)	Music and lyrics by Yao Ming; performed by Zhang Mai	
7	多少情和意 (How Much Love and Meaning)	Music by Xu Jingqing and lyrics by Yao Ming; performed by Wu Jing and Mou Xuanfu	Originally written as an insert song, but was replaced by a piece of background music in the final release.
8	看我跃马扬鞭 (Watch Me Ride My Horse and Wave My Whip)	Music and lyrics by Yao Ming; performed by Chi Chongrui	Insert song

== 1987 Television special ==
At the zenith of its release, a two-hour television special was aired on the Lunar New Year of 1987. Titled Qi Tian Le Festival Gala, it featured a range of performances by a majority of the show's main and supporting cast from episodes 1 to 20, alongside guest appearances by singers Jiang Dawei, Yu Junjian, Wu Jing and Hu Yinyin. Members of the Chinese Communist Party, including former Premier Zhao Ziyang, also attended the event.

== Broadcast ==
Season one was aired weekly in 1986 and 1988 while season two aired as a collective package on CCTV on 28 January 2000. Reruns of the episodes have continued to be aired across various channels on CCTV.

== Availability in the West ==
In 2017, CCTV released edited versions of both seasons on YouTube complete with English subtitles. Episode 5 of the second season was removed and instead merged with the fourth episode "Obstacle at Lion Camel Ridge", making a total of 40 episodes instead of the original 41.

== Reception ==
Upon its release, Journey to the West was praised for its faithfulness to the source material and lauded as one of the pioneers in national media for artistically representing China's traditions and values, its aesthetics helping break 'the single-role-image constructed by previous TV series'. On Chinese social networking service Douban, season one currently holds a 9.7/10 rating and season two 9.1/10, with the latter receiving some criticism for its writing, casting choices and music.

In the mainland, season one received a record viewership rate of 89.4% in 1987 while season two was less successful, peaking at a viewership rate of 30% in 2000. "Dare to Ask Where is the Road" has been called 'a household name' and has gone on to become one of the most recognized songs from a television series. Since their original airing, the first 25 episodes have been rebroadcast over 2000 times across various television networks in Mainland China, making Journey to the West one of the country's most watched series.

Internationally, Journey to the West received similar acclaim in Southeast Asia and helped launch Sun Wukong actor Liu Xiao Ling Tong into international stardom. The opening theme was also featured in the 2024 video game Black Myth: Wukong.

In response to the series' enduring popularity, Yang Jie was quoted as saying "People often express their love for Journey to the West to me, but every time I hear that kind of thing, I regret that I didn't do it better. If you ask me why so many people love this TV adaptation, I think I know the answer: In those days, my whole crew and I were working for art, not for money, fame or personal benefits.”

== Accolades ==
Year	Award	Category	Nominee	Result	Ref.
1988	Feitian Awards	Outstanding Artistry	Journey to the West	Won	
1988	Golden Eagle Awards	Outstanding Television Series	Journey to the West	Won	
1988	Golden Eagle Awards	Best Actor	Zhang Jinlai (Liu Xiao Ling Tong)	Won	

== See also ==
- List of media adaptations of Journey to the West
