= Shao opera =

Regional style of Chinese opera

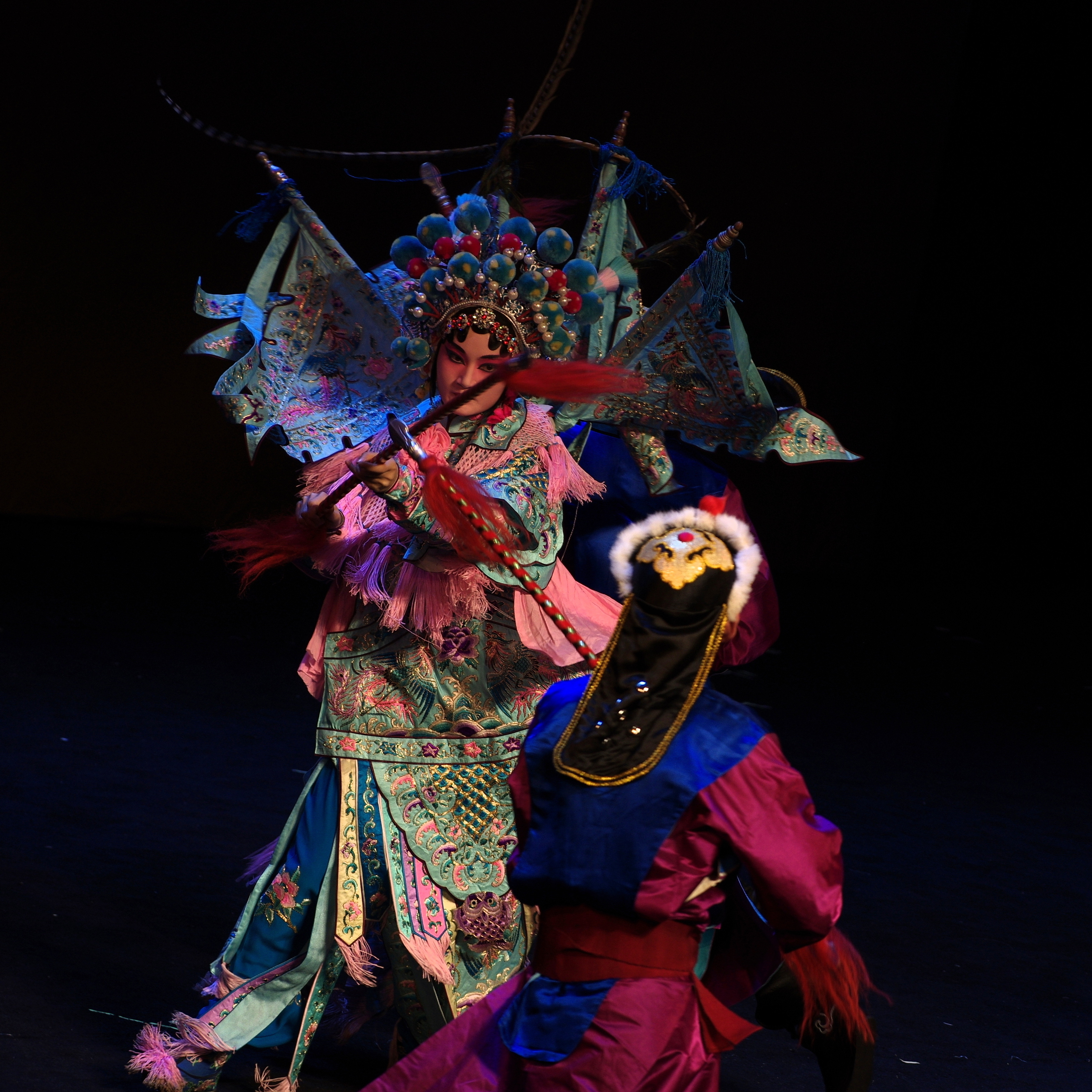
- Native name: Shaoju
- Other names: Shaoxing opera
- Origin: Late Ming dynasty
- Major region: Northern Zhejiang (area around Shaoxing, Ningbo, and Hangzhou), Shanghai
- Typical instruments: Banhu; Niutuiqin; Suona; Gong; Bo; Dizi; Sheng
- Topolect: Wu Chinese (Shaoxing dialect)

Chinese name
- Traditional Chinese: 紹劇
- Simplified Chinese: 绍剧
Transcriptions
Standard Mandarin
- Hanyu Pinyin: Shàojù

Shao opera (Chinese: 紹劇; pinyin: Shàojù), also known as Shaoxing opera, is a regional form of Chinese opera from Shaoxing, Zhejiang. It is not to be confused with Yue opera, which is also called Shaoxing opera. Shao opera is distinguished by its forceful music, exaggerated singing, and bold movements.

Shao opera is influenced by the singing style from neighboring Yuyao as well as the percussive music from Yiyang, Jiangxi, which converged in Shaoxing at the end of the Ming dynasty (1368–1644). The combined form was first used by shuochang (story-singing) storytellers who took on different roles with singing and music accompaniment. It was later transferred to the music theatre. Before long, the Shao opera music was dominated by the clapper (bangzi) style. Shao opera had its heyday in Shanghai in the early 20th century, but lost its foothold there to Peking opera and the younger Yue opera soon after.

== Famous performers ==
- Zhang Zongyi
