= Ma Dehua =

Chinese actor

- 马德华
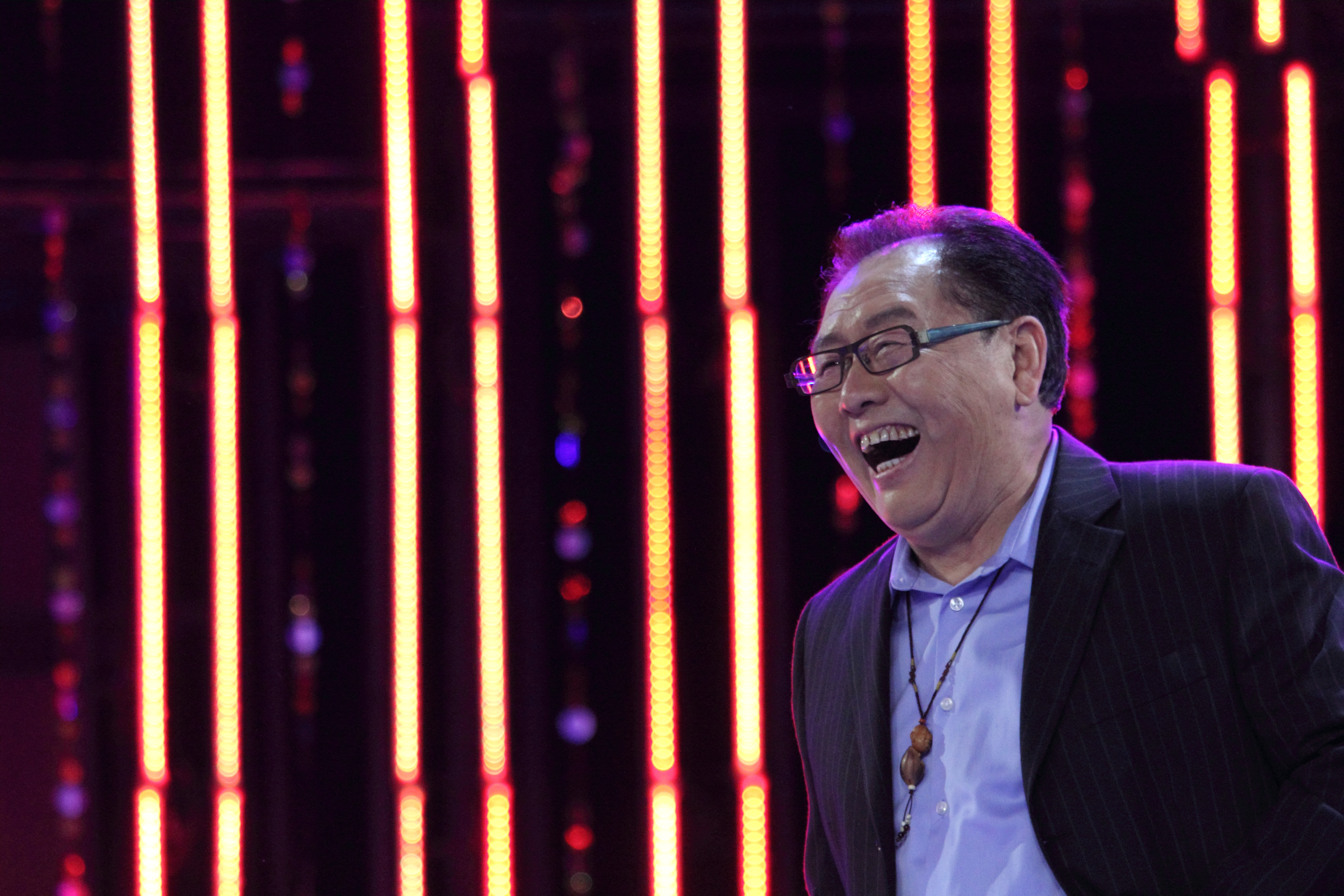
- Dehua on Star Reunion in 2014.
- Born: 11 August 1945 (age 81); Peking, China
- Education: China National Peking Opera Company
- Occupation: Actor
- Years active: 1982-present
- Spouse: Hou Yumin (m. 1972)
- Children: 1

Chinese name
- Traditional Chinese: 馬德華
- Simplified Chinese: 马德华
Transcriptions
Standard Mandarin
- Hanyu Pinyin: Mǎ Déhuá

Ma Dehua (Chinese: 马德华; born 11 August 1945) is a Chinese actor best known for his role as Zhu Bajie in the 1986 television series Journey to the West.

== Life ==
Ma was born in a family of merchants in Beijing on 11 August 1945, with his ancestral home in Wucheng County, Shandong, he is of Hui people ethnicity, he is the third child of four children.

Ma aspired to act from an early age. At the age of 5, Ma started to studied Chinese martial arts.

Ma studied at the High School Affiliated to Minzu University of China. Ma entered the China National Peking Opera Company by age 14, he learned Kunqu opera and Beijing opera there. After finished, Ma worked in the Northern Kunqu Opera Theater as an actor.

During the Cultural Revolution, Ma acted in Shajiabang, Taking Tiger Mountain by Strategy and Dujuan Mountain.

In early 1982, Director Yang Jie invited Ma to act Zhu Bajie in Journey to the West, by the age of 37. The series was one of the most watched ones in mainland China in that year.

Ma retired in 1999, at the age of 54.

In 2007, Ma starred opposite Liu Xiao Ling Tong, Chi Chongrui, Liu Dagang in Wu Cheng'en and Journey to the West.

== Personal life ==
Ma married worker Hou Yumin (侯玉敏) in October 1972, they have a son, Ma Yang (马洋; born 1973).

== Filmography ==
=== Film ===
Year	English title	Chinese title	Role	Notes
2016		封魔录后传		
2016		滚出来，凶手		
2016	The New Year's Eve of Old Lee	过年好	An old man	
2017	How to Train the Demon	笑八仙前传之驯妖记	Zhang Guolao	
2018	White Bone Lady Fights the Wolf Demon			
2019	Miser	财迷	Zhu Shoufu	
2019	Youth	误入青春	Jiang Hai	
2019	Hearted Road			
TBA	Journey to the West 3D	敢问路在何方	Sha Wujing	

=== Television ===
Year	English title	Chinese title	Role	Notes
1982	Journey to the West	西游记	Zhu Bajie	
2006	The Story of an Old Man	老人的故事	Grandpa Shi	
2007	Wu Cheng'en and Journey to the West	吴承恩与西游记	Zhu Bajie	
2011	Fake President	冒牌董事长	President Liao	
2012	Blind Date	喜事连连剩男相亲记	Lao Guan	
