= Liu Ling Tong =

Zhang Zongyi
- 章宗义
- Born: March 16, 1924; Shangyu District, Shaoxing, Zhejiang, China
- Died: January 31, 2014 (aged 89); Shaoxing, Zhejiang, China
- Other names: Liu Ling Tong (六龄童); Southern Monkey King (南猴王)
- Occupations: Shao opera actor, artist
- Years active: 1936-2012
- Organization: Zhejiang Shao Opera Theatre
- Notable work: Sun Wukong in Pingdingshan; The Monkey King Thrice Defeats the Skeleton Demon; The Flaming Mountain; The Monkey King caused havoc in Heaven
- Children: Zhang Jinlai; Zhang Jinxing
- Parent: Zhang Yisheng

Chinese name
- Traditional Chinese: 章宗義
- Simplified Chinese: 章宗义
Transcriptions
Standard Mandarin
- Hanyu Pinyin: Zhāng Zōngyì

Liu Ling Tong
- Traditional Chinese: 六齡童
- Simplified Chinese: 六龄童
- Literal meaning: Six Year Old Child
Transcriptions
Standard Mandarin
- Hanyu Pinyin: Liù Líng Tóng

Nan Hou Wang
- Chinese: 南猴王
- Literal meaning: Southern Monkey King
Transcriptions
Standard Mandarin
- Hanyu Pinyin: Nán Hóu Wáng

Zhang Zongyi (Chinese: 章宗义; 16 March 1924 – 31 January 2014), better known by his stage name Liu Ling Tong (六龄童; literally: "Six Year Old Child") and famously known as "Nan Hou Wang" (南猴王; literally: "Southern Monkey King"), was a Chinese Shao opera actor and artist best known for his role as the Monkey King (Sun Wukong) in Shao opera. He was president of the Zhejiang Shao Opera Theatre and a member of special government allowances of the State Council of Experts. He was a member of the 5th, 6th, 7th and 8th National Committee of the Chinese People's Political Consultative Conference.

== Biography ==
Zhang was born on March 16, 1924, in Shangyu District of Shaoxing, Zhejiang in a family of performing artists. His grandfather, Zhang Tingchun (章廷椿), mostly performed in the countryside of Zhejiang under the stage name "Huo Hou Zhang" (活猴章). Zhang's father, Zhang Yisheng (章益生) with the stage name "Sai Huo Hou" (赛活猴; literally: "Better than a living monkey"). His elder brother, Zhang Zongxin (章宗信), who specialised in playing Zhu Bajie, had the stage name "Qi Ling Tong" (七龄童; literally: "Seven Year Old Child").

Zhang began his acting career at age 6 and made his acting debut at age 12.

After the founding of the Communist State, he was appointed president of the Zhejiang Shao Opera Troupe. In August 1956, Zhang performed The Monkey King caused havoc in Heaven for Vice Premier Chen Yi and Indonesian President Sukarno. On December 17, 1957, he performed The Monkey King caused havoc in Heaven again for Premier Zhou Enlai and Soviet guests at Shanghai Sino - Soviet Friendship Mansion. In 1961, he performed The Monkey King Thrice Defeats the Skeleton Demon for Mao Zedong, his performance was acclaimed by Mao. It was filmed as a color drama film, released in 72 countries and regions.

In 1966, Mao Zedong launched the Cultural Revolution, Zhang was labeled as a rightist, a capitalist roader, a reactionary scholar and a counter-revolutionary revisionist. The Red Guards took him into custody and put him under investigation. They paraded him through the streets and beat him in public. Finally, he was sent to countryside to a labour camp. In the fall of 1971, Mao Zedong toured in southern China and ordered him to be released. In 1974, Zhang returned to the public stage, he earned an Outstanding Performance Award in the 1st Zhejiang Drama Festival for his performance as Sun Wukong in The Flaming Mountain.

On January 31, 2014, he died of illness in Shaoxing, Zhejiang.

== Drama work ==
- Sun Wukong in Pingdingshan (孙悟空大破平顶山)
- The Monkey King Thrice Defeats the Skeleton Demon (孙悟空三打白骨精)
- The Flaming Mountain (火焰山)
- The Monkey King caused havoc in Heaven (孙悟空大闹天宫)

== Book ==
- 取经路上五十年 [Journey to the West in 50 Years] (in Chinese). Shanghai: Shanghai Art and Literature Publishing House. 1988. ISBN 9787532101276.
- 两代美猴王 [Two generations of the Monkey King] (in Chinese). North Literature & Art Publishing House. 1988. ISBN 9787531700807.

== Personal life ==
Zhang had eleven sons. Zhang Jinlai, better known by his stage name Liu Xiao Ling Tong (六小龄童; literally: "Little Six Year Old Child"), and Zhang Jinxing (章金星; 1959 - 1966), better known by his stage name "Xiao Liu Ling Tong" (小六龄童; literally: "Little Six Year Old Child", or "Six Year Old Child, Junior").
