= Heifeng Guai =

Character in Journey to the West

Black Wind Demon
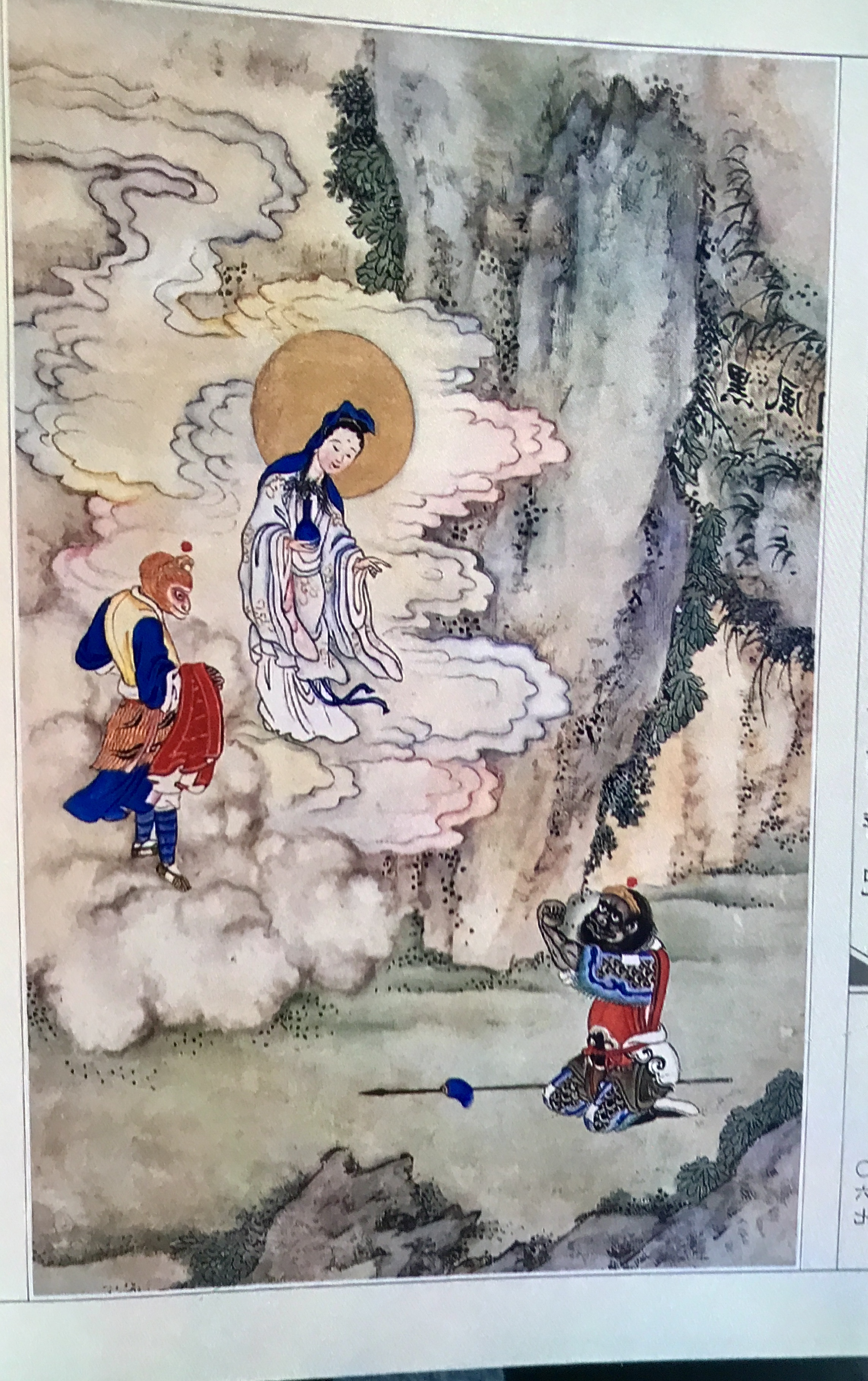
- The Black Wind Demon surrendering to Guanyin
- Traditional Chinese: 黑風怪
- Simplified Chinese: 黑风怪
Transcriptions
Standard Mandarin
- Hanyu Pinyin: Hēifēng Guài

Black Bear Spirit
- Traditional Chinese: 黑熊精
- Simplified Chinese: 黑熊精
Transcriptions
Standard Mandarin
- Hanyu Pinyin: Hēixióng Jīng

Heifeng Guai (simplified Chinese: 黑风怪; traditional Chinese: 黑風怪; pinyin: Hēifēng Guài), also known as the Black Wind Demon or Black Bear Spirit (Chinese: 黑熊精; pinyin: Hēixióng Jīng), is a character in the 16th-century Chinese novel Journey to the West. He is a black bear demon who lives in Black Wind Cave on Black Wind Mountain (黑風山). He can take human form and usually appears as a dark-skinned man carrying a spear with a black tassel.

The Black Wind Demon steals Tang Sanzang's cassock during a fire at the Guanyin Monastery. Sun Wukong fights him but cannot recover it. With help from Guanyin, Wukong defeats the demon and retrieves the cassock. Guanyin then takes the Black Wind Demon to Mount Luojia, where he becomes a guardian of the mountain.

== Role in Journey to the West ==
The Black Wind Demon lives near the Guanyin Monastery, where he is a friend of the abbot, Elder Jinchi. He often visits the monastery to discuss Buddhist teachings and has taught Jinchi methods of extending his life.

When Tang Sanzang and Sun Wukong stay at the monastery, Jinchi sees Sanzang's valuable cassock and wants to keep it. He orders the monks to set fire to the building while the pilgrims are asleep. Wukong protects Sanzang from the flames, but the fire spreads through the monastery.

The Black Wind Demon sees the fire and comes to help. When he notices the cassock, he steals it and returns to Black Wind Cave. He plans to show it to his friends at a feast for his birthday.

Wukong goes to Black Wind Mountain and finds the demon talking with two friends, a white snake spirit and a wolf spirit named Lingxu. The three are discussing Daoist alchemy. Wukong attacks them and kills the snake spirit, but the others escape. He then fights the Black Wind Demon several times. Neither can defeat the other, and the demon repeatedly retreats into his cave.

Unable to recover the cassock, Wukong asks Guanyin for help. On their way to the cave, they meet Lingxu carrying two pills as a birthday gift for the Black Wind Demon. Wukong kills him and proposes a plan. Guanyin takes Lingxu's form, while Wukong changes himself into one of the pills.

Guanyin enters the cave and offers the pills to the demon. When he swallows the one containing Wukong, Wukong returns to his normal form inside the demon's stomach and causes him great pain. Guanyin takes back the cassock and places a magic hoop around the demon's head. She recites a spell that makes the hoop tighten, forcing him to surrender.

The Black Wind Demon agrees to follow Guanyin. She spares his life and takes him to Mount Luojia to serve as a guardian of the mountain, known as the Shoushan Dashen (守山大神).

== Literary background ==
In the Yuan dynasty zaju version of Journey to the West by Yang Jingxian, Zhu Bajie calls himself the Black Wind King (黑風大王) and lives in Black Wind Cave. He describes himself as a former chariot general serving Mārīcī. The Black Bear Demon does not appear in this version. In the later novel, Zhu Bajie lives in Cloud-Pathway Cave (雲棧洞), while the Black Bear Demon occupies Black Wind Cave. Zhao Shuang notes that the cave and the title Black Wind King were used for Bajie in the earlier play but were given to the bear demon in the novel.

== Interpretations ==
The Black Bear Demon is different from many other demons in Journey to the West. He studies religion, knows methods of alchemy, and has enough fighting skill to match Sun Wukong. He is also not interested in eating Tang Sanzang. His main weakness is his desire to possess the valuable cassock.

Zhao Shuang compares the demon with Elder Jinchi. Jinchi has spent many years studying Buddhism but still wants fine robes and other possessions. The Black Bear Demon has also gained spiritual powers, yet he steals the cassock when he sees it. Zhao sees greed as the cause of both characters' troubles. He also notes that Guanyin uses a magic hoop to control the bear, just as Wukong is controlled by a similar hoop.

The novel also calls the demon a xiongpi (熊羆), an old Chinese term for a strong bear. Zhao Shuang notes that pi (羆) means brown bear, although the demon is described as black. The words xiong and pi often appeared together in ancient Chinese texts. Zhao also mentions the legend of Yu the Great, who turned into a bear while controlling the Great Flood. Zhao suggests that the old term was used to show the demon's great strength.

== In modern media ==
The 1986 television series Journey to the West used Qingzhi Mountain in Lianjiang County, Fujian, as the setting for Black Wind Cave. The nearby Yongquan Temple in Fuzhou was used for the Guanyin Monastery scenes. Both locations were used during filming in 1982.

The Black Bear Demon appears in the 2024 action role-playing game Black Myth: Wukong as Black Bear Guai, the final boss of the game's first chapter. He returns to Black Wind Mountain after receiving one of Sun Wukong's six relics, known as the Craving Eyes. The player fights him at Bodhi Peak, where he uses black mist and fire attacks. Defeating him gives the player the Craving Eyes relic.

The game's story also returns to the friendship between the Black Bear Demon and Elder Jinchi. The animated ending of the first chapter shows the demon helping Jinchi during his younger years. Jinchi later becomes a respected monk but remains attached to his collection of cassocks. His greed leads to the destruction of the monastery.
