= Kung Fu Cult Master =

1993 Hong Kong film by Wong Jing

- Theatrical poster
- 倚天屠龍記之魔教教主
- Directed by: Wong Jing
- Screenplay by: Wong Jing
- Based on: The Heaven Sword and Dragon Saber by Jin Yong
- Produced by: Jet Li
- Starring: Jet Li; Sharla Cheung; Chingmy Yau; Gigi Lai; Sammo Hung
- Cinematography: Bill Wong
- Edited by: Poon Hung
- Music by: Joseph Koo
- Production company: Win's Entertainment
- Distributed by: Gala Film Distribution
- Release date: 18 December 1993
- Running time: 95 minutes
- Country: Hong Kong
- Language: Cantonese
- Box office: HK$10,437,757

Kung Fu Cult Master (倚天屠龍記之魔教教主), also known as Kung Fu Master, Evil Cult, and Lord of the Wu Tang, is a 1993 Hong Kong wuxia film loosely adapted from the novel The Heaven Sword and Dragon Saber by Jin Yong. Directed by Wong Jing, it featured fight choreography by Sammo Hung and starred Jet Li, Sharla Cheung, Chingmy Yau, and Gigi Lai. As the film performed poorly at the box office, the plans for a sequel were subsequently cancelled, and its cliffhanger ending was left unresolved.

== Synopsis ==
Zhang Wuji and his parents return from a remote island and travel to the Wudang Sect to celebrate his grandmaster Zhang Sanfeng's 100th birthday. During the ceremony, many martial artists try to force Zhang Wuji's parents to reveal the whereabouts of his godfather Xie Xun, but they refuse and commit suicide. Zhang Wuji is wounded by the Xuanming Elders and almost dies, but Zhang Sanfeng saves him and attempts to heal him. Zhang Sanfeng's special treatment of Zhang Wuji incurs the jealousy of Song Qingshu, who plots with Zhou Zhiruo of the Emei Sect to harm Zhang Wuji.

One day, Zhang Wuji falls off a cliff together with Xiaozhao when Song Qingshu is bullying him. They meet Huogong Toutuo by chance and Zhang Wuji learns the "Nine Yang Divine Skill", completely healing himself in the process. Later, they discover that the six major orthodox sects of the wulin are planning to attack the Ming Cult, where Zhang Wuji's maternal grandfather Yin Tianzheng is based. Zhang Wuji ventures into a forbidden location in the cult's headquarters, learns the powerful "Heaven and Earth Great Shift", and helps the cult defeat the six sects. The cult members, feeling grateful to Zhang Wuji, choose him to be their leader.

Zhang Wuji learns that the conflict between the Ming Cult and six sects was instigated by Cheng Kun, his godfather's enemy who has been in disguise as a Shaolin monk all this time. During this time, he encounters the Mongol princess Zhao Min, who seeks to destroy the Ming Cult. After she poisons the cult members, Zhang Wuji agrees to do three things for her in exchange for the antidote. Meanwhile, Yin Tianzheng and the cult members, mistakenly thinking that the Shaolin Sect poisoned them, go to Shaolin to seek revenge but see corpses everywhere.

It turns out that Song Qingshu has betrayed the Wudang Sect and pledged allegiance to the Mongol-led Yuan government. He plots with Zhao Min to kill Zhang Sanfeng, but Zhang Wuji shows up in the nick of time and saves his grandmaster. Promising not to use any other skill except taijiquan, Zhang Wuji defeats the Xuanming Elders who work for Zhao Min. The film ends on a cliffhanger as Zhao Min leaves after telling Zhang Wuji to go to Dadu to find her if he wants to rescue the missing members of the six sects.

== Cast ==
- Jet Li as Zhang Wuji
- Sharla Cheung as Zhao Min / Yin Susu
- Gigi Lai as Zhou Zhiruo
- Chingmy Yau as Xiaozhao
- Sammo Hung as Zhang Sanfeng
- Francis Ng as Zhang Cuishan
- Sun Mengquan as Miejue
- Bryan Leung as Lu Zhangke
- Zhang Chunzhong as He Biweng
- Shao Wanlin as Yin Tianzheng
- Collin Chou as Song Qingshu
- Richard Ng as Wei Yixiao
- Tin Kai-man and Zou Yixun as the Mount Hua elders
- Yan Huaili as Xie Xun
- Yu Yankai as Cheng Kun / Yuanzhen
- Zhang Xusheng as Huogong Toutuo
- Ji Qilin as Zhu Yuanzhang
- Cao Rong as Kongxing
