= Sha Wujing =

Chinese character in Journey to the West

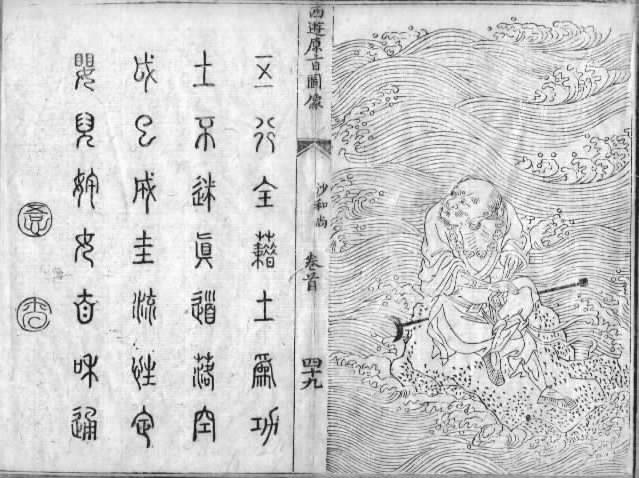
- Sha Wujing in Xiyou yuanzhi (西遊原旨), published 1819.

Chinese name
- Traditional Chinese: 沙悟淨
- Simplified Chinese: 沙悟净
Transcriptions
Standard Mandarin
- Hanyu Pinyin: Shā Wùjìng
- Wade–Giles: Sha^{1} Wu^{4}-ching^{4}
- IPA: [ʂá û.tɕîŋ]
Gan
- Romanization: Sa Ng Chhìn
Yue: Cantonese
- Yale Romanization: Sāa Nghjihng
- Jyutping: Saa^{1} Ng^{6}-zing^{6}
- IPA: [sa˥ ŋ.tsɪŋ˨]
Southern Min
- Hokkien POJ: Sa Gō͘-chēng

Burmese name
- Burmese: ရှားဝူကျင့်

Vietnamese name
- Vietnamese alphabet: Sa Tăng ("Monk Sha"), Sa Ngộ Tĩnh or Sa Ngộ Tịnh
- Chữ Hán: 沙僧, 沙悟淨

Thai name
- Thai: ซัวเจ๋ง
- RTGS: Sua Cheng (Note: From a Teochew pronunciation of 沙僧 "Monk Sha")

Korean name
- Hangul: 사오정
Transcriptions
- Revised Romanization: Sa Ojeong

Japanese name
- Hiragana: さ ごじょう
- Kyūjitai: 沙悟凈
- Shinjitai: 沙悟浄
Transcriptions
- Romanization: Sa Gojō

Khmer name
- Khmer: សា អ៊ូជីង

Sha Wujing (Chinese: 沙悟淨) is one of the three disciples of the Buddhist pilgrim Tang Sanzang in the 16th-century novel Journey to the West written by Wu Cheng'en in the Ming dynasty, although versions of his character predate the Ming novel. In the source novel, his background is the least developed of the pilgrims, and he contributes the least to their efforts. In the original Chinese story, he is a man-eating monster. In many Japanese versions, Sha Wujing is depicted as a Kappa.

== Names ==
His Buddhist Dharma name, "Sha Wujing", given to him by the bodhisattva Guanyin, means "sand aware of purity". His name is rendered in Korean as Sa Oh Jeong, into Japanese as Sa Gojō, into Sino-Vietnamese as Sa Ngộ Tịnh.

He is also known as "Monk Sha" (Chinese: 沙僧; pinyin: Shā Sēng; Sa Tăng in Sino-Vietnamese; Sua Cheng in Thai) or Sha Heshang (沙和尚 colloquial Chinese), both basically translating as "Sand Monk" or "Sand Priest".

== Overview ==
Like Zhu Bajie, Wujing was originally a general in Heaven, more specifically a Curtain-Lifting General (卷帘大将; juǎnlián dàjiàng). His fall from grace happens when he broke a valuable Jade or Crystal vase or goblet, during a Heavenly Peach Festival; some sources say that he had done this in a fit of rage while other sources say that he had done this unintentionally, and it was an accident. Either way, he was punished by the Jade Emperor, who had him struck 800 times with a rod and exiled to earth, where he was to be reincarnated as a terrible man-eating monster. There, he lived in the Liúshā-hé (流沙河; "flowing-sand river", or "quicksand-river"). The Japanese version depicts him as a Kappa. Each day, seven flying swords sent from Heaven would stab him in the chest and then return. He had to live in the river full-time to avoid the punishment.

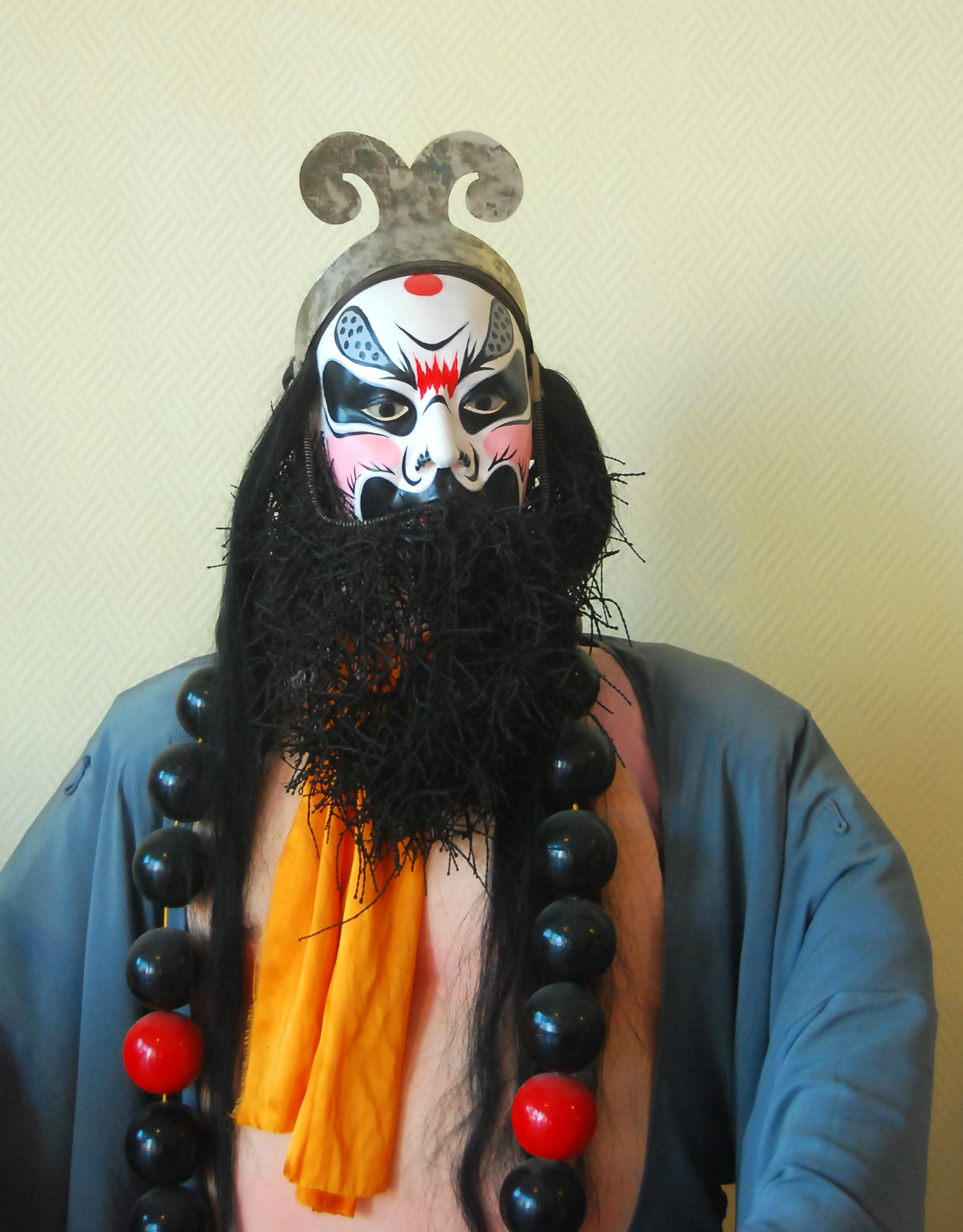
Character as portrayed in Peking opera

Wujing's appearance was grisly. He had a red beard and sometimes had blue skin, and he was partially bald. He was sometimes much bigger and stronger than an average human being. He still carried the weapon he had in Heaven, a magic wooden staff (made from a species of evergreen tree that grew on the moon, holds within it a solid-gold core and the outside is decorated with "countless pearly-threads"), which is named Xiangyaobaozhang (降妖寶杖; 'Monster-subduing Precious Rod'), created for him by Lu Ban (often depicted in artwork as a Monk's spade). Like Sun Wukong's Ruyi Jingu Bang, Wujing's Xiangyaobaozhang is capable of growing, shrinking, lengthening and shortening at will. A necklace consisting of skulls made him look even more terrible; according to one story, an earlier group of nine monks on a pilgrimage west to fetch the scriptures met their end at the hands of Wujing. Heedless of their pleas for mercy, he devoured them, sucked the marrow from their bones, and threw their skulls into the river. Unlike his other victims, whose bone sank to the river bottom, these skulls of the nine monks floated. This fascinated and delighted Wujing, who strung them on a rope and played with them when he was bored.

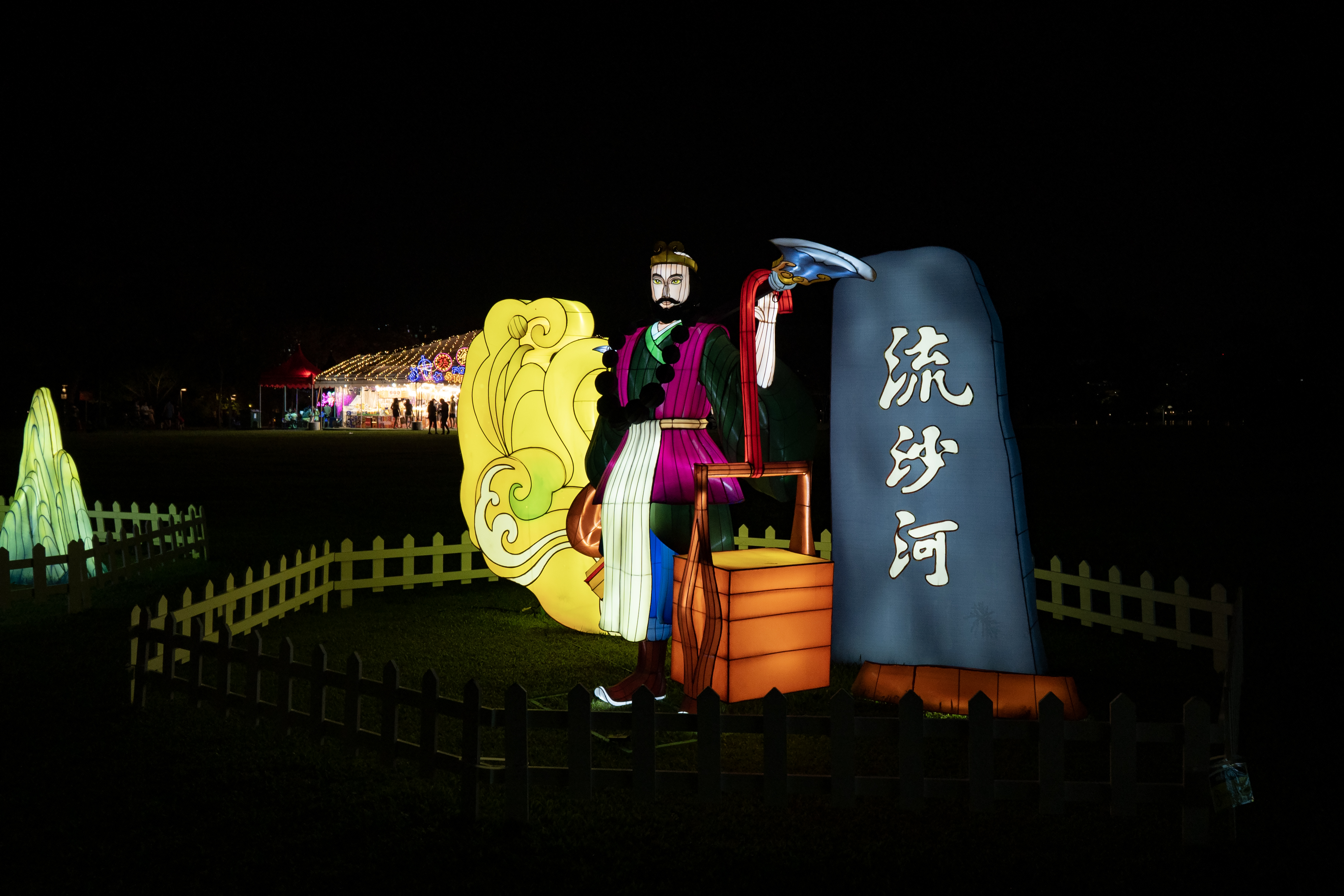
Sha Wujing lantern display during a Mid-Autumn Festival Event in Singapore.

Later, Guanyin, the bodhisattva of compassion, and her disciple, Prince Moksha, came searching for powerful bodyguards in preparation of Tang Sanzang's journey west. She recruited Wujing, in exchange for which, she granted some respite from his suffering. She then converted him to Buddhism and gave him his Dharma name, Shā Wùjìng (沙悟淨); his surname Shā ("Sand") was taken from his river home, while his given name Wùjìng means "Awakened-to/Aware-of Purity". Finally, he was instructed to wait for a monk who would call for him. When Wujing does meet Tang Sanzang, he is mistaken for an enemy and attacked by Sun Wukong and Zhu Bajie. Guanyin is forced to intervene for the sake of the journey.

After the misunderstanding was cleared up, Wujing became the third disciple of Tang Sanzang, who called him 沙和尚; Shā-héshàng; "sand priest". Now, he was clad in a Buddhist pilgrim's robe. During the Journey to the West, his swimming ability was useful. He always carried a small gourd which he could turn into a huge one, in order to cross rivers. Wujing was a kind-hearted and obedient person and loyal to his master, and, compared to his fellow disciples, Wujing serves as a 'Straight man' character. Amongst the trio, he was likely the most polite and the most logical. Some adaptations portray him as also being bookish and philosophical. At the journey's end, Buddha transformed him into an arhat known as the Golden-bodied Arhat (金身羅漢; Jīnshēn luóhàn).

As the third disciple, even though his fighting skills are not as great as that of Wukong or Bajie, he is still a great warrior protecting Tang Sanzang and can use his intellect as well as his strength to beat the enemy. He knows only 18 forms of transformation (one-quarter of the full 72 that Wukong knows, and one-half of Bajie's 36) and, in the middle of the story, admits as much.

== Historical origins ==
Sha Wujing is the end result of embellishing a supernatural figure mentioned in Monk Hui Li's (慧立) 7th-century account of the historical Xuanzang called Daciensi Sanzang Fashi Zhuan (大慈恩寺三藏法師傳; "A Biography of the Tripitaka-master of the Great Ci'en Monastery"). According to the text, Xuanzang spilled his surplus of water while in the deserts near Dunhuang. After several days without liquid, Xuanzang had a dream where a tall spirit wielding a ji (halberd) chastised him for sleeping on such an important journey to get scriptures from India. He immediately woke up and got on his horse, which took off in a different direction than what he wanted to go. They finally came to an oasis with green grass and fresh water.

The Tang Sanzang ji (唐三藏记; "Record of the Tang Monk Tripitaka"), a book of unknown date appearing in an 11th-century Japanese collection of tales known as Jōbodai shū (成菩堤集), states Xuanzang (Tang Sanzang) was magically provided food and drink by a Deva while in the "Flowing Sands" (流沙; liusha) desert. The compiler of the Jōbodai shū explained: "This is the reason for the name Spirit of the Deep Sands (深沙神; Shensha shen)." After performing a pilgrimage to China in 838–839, the Japanese Buddhist monk Jōgyō (常晓) wrote a report which mentions Xuanzang's fabled exchange with the deity, as well as equates Shensha shen with King Vaiśravaṇa, one of the Four Heavenly Kings of Buddhism. Therefore, the Tang Sanzang ji most likely hails from the Tang Dynasty (618–907). The Jōbodai shū also mentions the god manifested itself before the famous Chinese Buddhist monk Faxian (c. 4th century) during his pilgrimage to India. Shensha shen tells him: "I am manifested in an aspect of fury. My head is like a crimson bowl. My two hands are like the nets of heaven and earth. From my neck hang the heads of seven demons. About my limbs are eight serpents, and two demon heads seem to engulf my (nether-) limbs…"

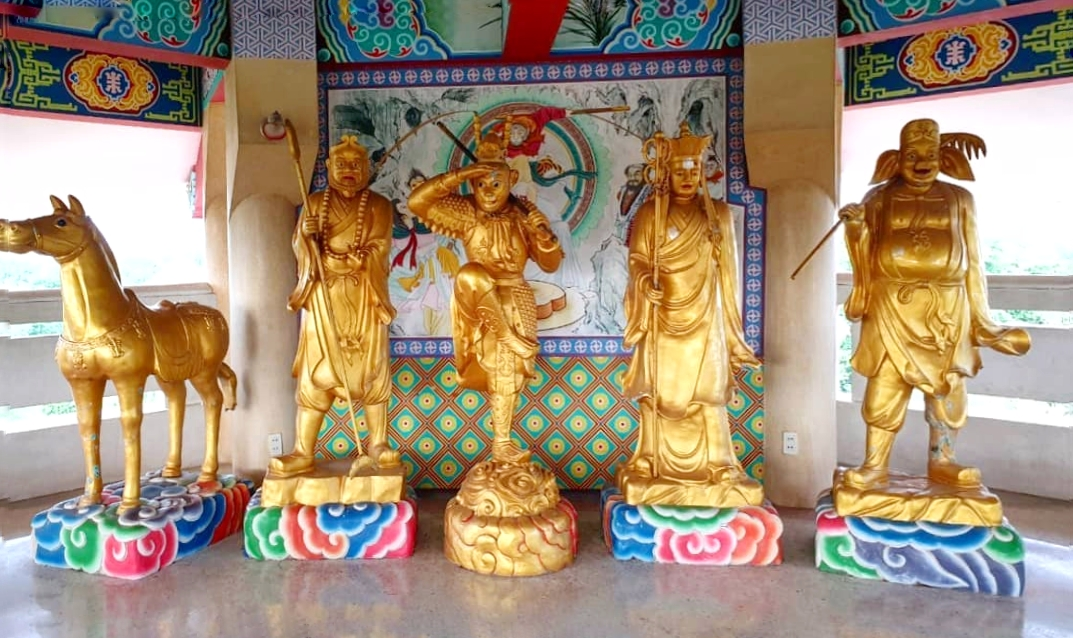
The golden statues at the Rua Yai City Pillar Shrine in Suphan Buri, Thailand

By the compiling of the "Kōzanji version" (高山记, 13th century), the earliest known edition of Journey to the West, Shensha shen was transformed into a blood thirsty demon who had continuously eaten Tang Sanzang's past reincarnations. The demon tells him: "Slung here from my neck are the dry bones from when I twice before devoured you, monk!" Shensha Shen only helps him to pass over the deep sands with the aid of a magic golden bridge after Tang Sanzang threatens him with heavenly retribution.

As can be seen, the complete version of Journey to the West anonymously published in 1592 borrowed liberally from tales concerning Shensha shen. The character of Sha Wujing was given his monstrous appearance and dress. The skulls of the nine Buddhist monks hanging from his head recalls both the demon skulls worn by the spirit, and the skulls of Tang Sanzang's past incarnations worn by his wrathful counterpart from the Kōzanji version. His home of the "Flowing Sands River" (流沙河; Liusha he) is derived from the "Flowing Sands" desert inhabited by Shensha shen. Sha Wujing also aids Tang Sanzang pass over the Flowing Sands River by tying his nine skulls into a makeshift raft.

== See also ==
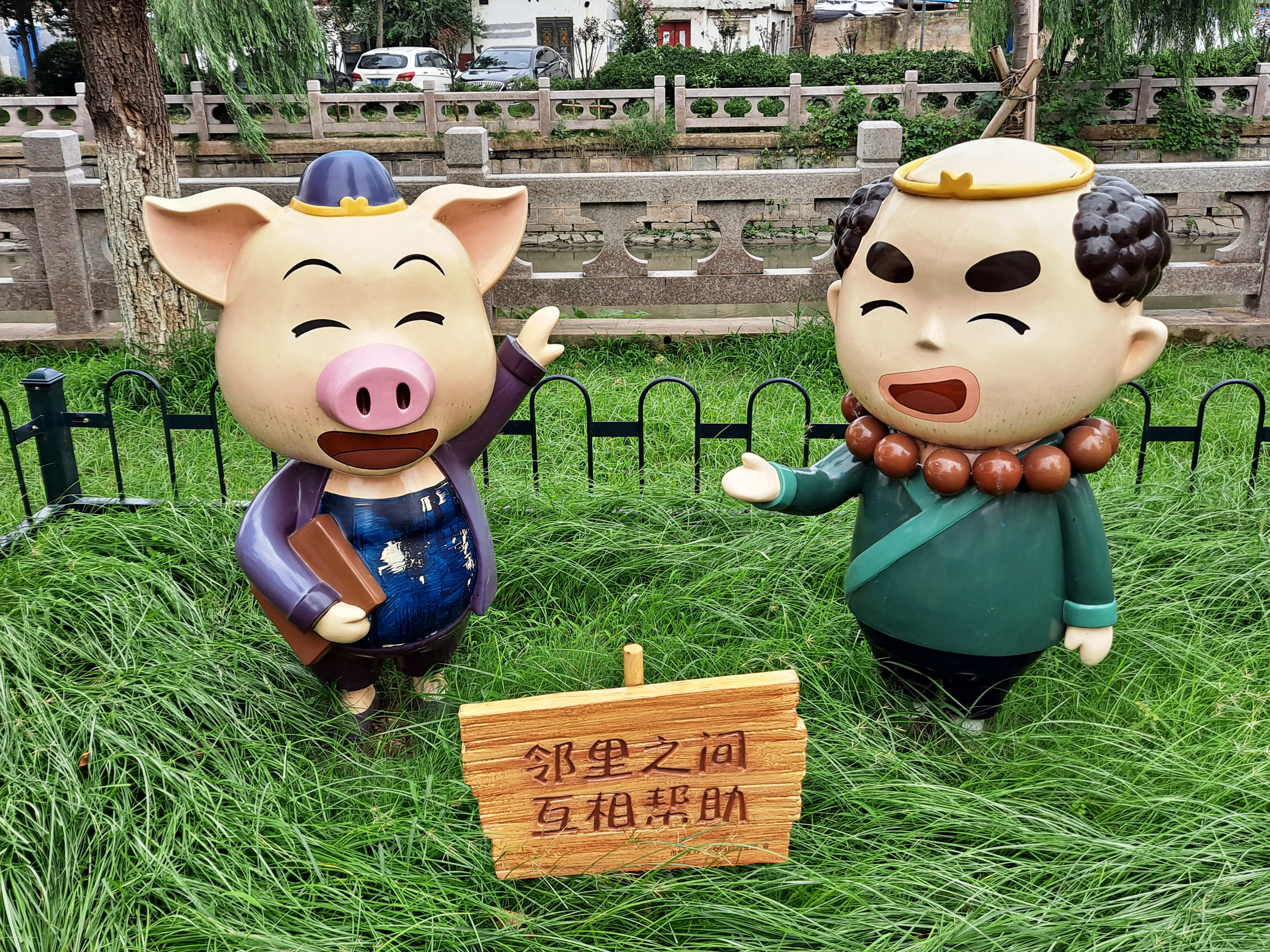
Cartoons of Zhu Bajie and Sha Wujing on the streets of Lianyungang

- List of media adaptations of Journey to the West
