= Liu Xiao Ling Tong =

Chinese actor

- 六小龄童
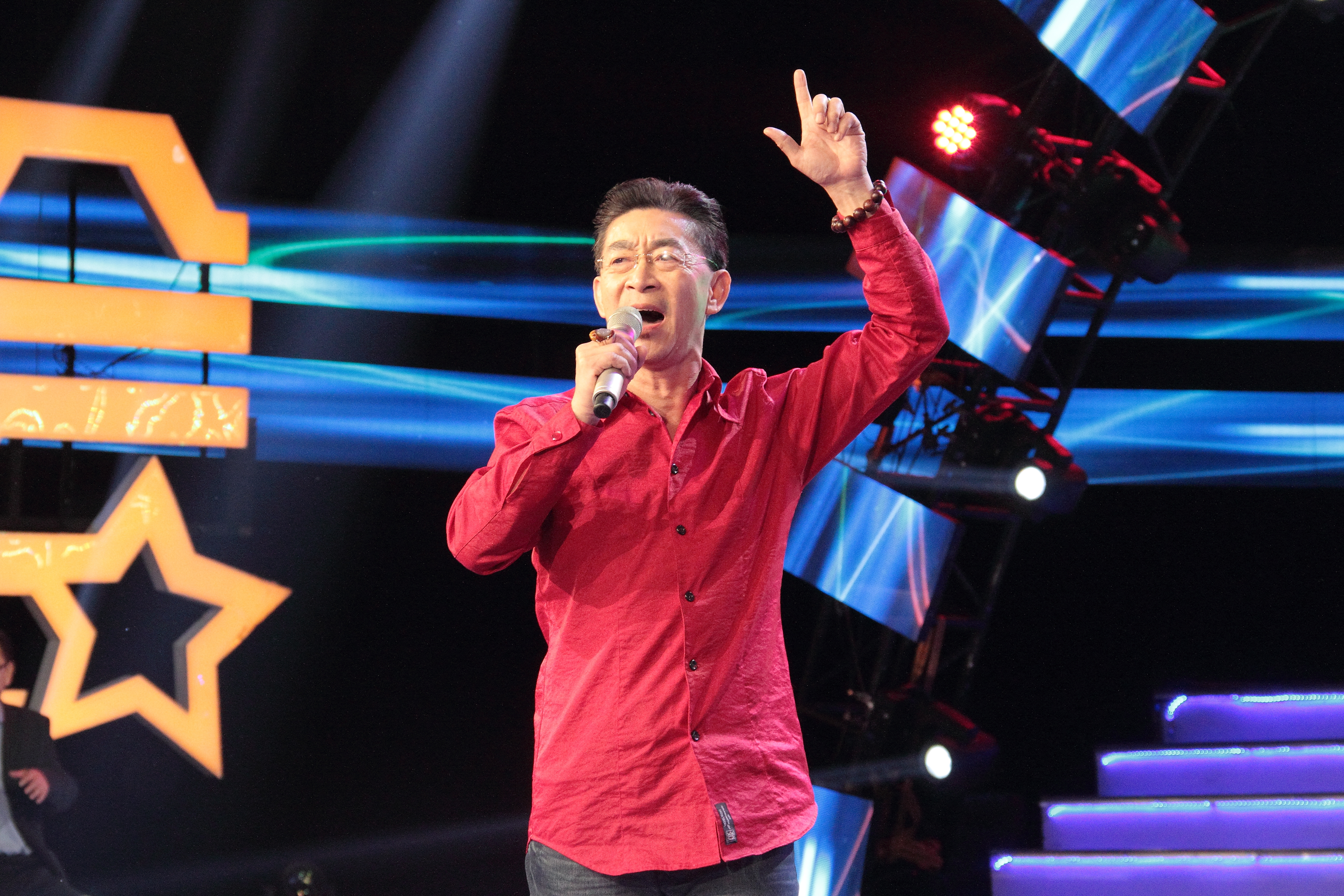
- Liu Xiao Ling Tong on Star Reunion in 2014.
- Born: Zhang Jinlai (章金莱); 12 April 1959 (age 67); Shanghai, China
- Education: Art School of Zhejiang Kunju Opera Troupe
- Occupation: Actor
- Years active: 1965–present
- Spouse: Yu Hong (m. 1988)
- Children: 1
- Parent(s): Zhang Zongyi (father); Yan Chagu (mother)
- Awards: Golden Eagle Award for Best Actor (1988)

Chinese name
- Traditional Chinese: 六小齡童
- Simplified Chinese: 六小龄童
Transcriptions
Standard Mandarin
- Hanyu Pinyin: Liù Xiǎo Líng Tóng

Zhang Jinlai
- Traditional Chinese: 章金萊
- Simplified Chinese: 章金莱
Transcriptions
Standard Mandarin
- Hanyu Pinyin: Zhāng Jīnlái

Zhang Jinlai (Chinese: 章金莱; born 12 April 1959), better known by his stage name Liu Xiao Ling Tong (六小龄童; 'Little Six Year Old Child'), is a Chinese actor, best known for his role as the Monkey King (Sun Wukong) in the 1986 television series Journey to the West (Chinese: 西游记; pinyin: Xī Yóu Jì) adapted from the classic Chinese novel of the same name. Zhang adopted his father Zhang Zongyi's stage name, Liu Ling Tong, and amended it to Liu Xiao Ling Tong.

His compelling performance in Journey to the West was greatly praised by critics and helped him win the Best Actor award at the sixth Golden Eagle Awards in 1988. On September 27, 2006, he was conferred the Certificate of Mouthpiece of the 3rd International Forum of the China Cultural Industry.

In March 1991, he starred in the drama film "New Year's Day" (过年). In the autumn of 1993, he played the role of his father, Liu Lingtong, in the TV series "Monkey Child" (猴娃), for which he won the 12th Golden Eagle Award for the best supporting actor in China. In 2000, he starred in the ancient mythological drama "Journey to the West II", for which he won the National Top Ten Outstanding Actor Award from CCTV.

In 2003, he played the role of Hua Tie Gan in the ancient martial arts drama "Lian Cheng Jue" (连城诀), which was his first time playing a villainous role. In June 2007, he played both the roles of Wu Chengen and Sun Wukong in the costume drama "Wu Cheng'en and the Journey to the West" (吴承恩与西游记). In 2009, he acted in the historical drama "War and Peace in the North" (北平战与和), and in 2015, acted in the ancient mythological drama "Shi Dang Dang Zhi Xiong Ceng Tian Dong“ (石敢当之雄峙天东)。

In 2017, he was awarded as a national actor; in the same year, he played the role of Master Xuanzang in the documentary "One Belt, One Road - Retracing the Road of Xuanzang" (一带一路·重走玄奘路) and was the chief producer and director of the documentary, which won the Best Documentary Award at the Vancouver International Chinese Film Festival;

In recent years, Zhang has made great efforts promoting Sun Wukong in popular culture, which contributed to increasing the popularity of both the classic novel and the character around the world.

== Early life and family ==
Zhang was born on April 12, 1959, in Shanghai, in a family of performing artists. His family members, who are Peking opera actors, specialized in playing the role of the Monkey King (Sun Wukong), the protagonist of the classical novel Journey to the West. Zhang's great-grandfather, Zhang Tingchun (章廷椿), was even considered "better than a living Monkey King". Zhang Tingchun mostly performed in the countryside of Zhejiang under the stage name "Huo Hou Zhang" (活猴章).

Zhang's grandfather, Zhang Yisheng (章益生), had the stage name "Sai Huo Hou" (赛活猴; 賽活猴; Sài Huó Hóu; 'Better than a living monkey'). Zhang Yisheng moved from Peking to Shanghai and trained his two sons. Zhang's father, Zhang Zongyi, whose stage name was "Liu Ling Tong" (六龄童; 六齡童; Liù Líng Tóng; 'Six Year Old Child'), was famously known as "Nan Hou Wang" (南猴王; Nán Hóu Wáng; 'Southern Monkey King'). Zhang Zongyi's stage name indicated his age when he started performing. His performance was acclaimed by Chinese leaders, including Mao Zedong and Zhou Enlai. His specialty was Sun Wukong, gaining him the nickname "Monkey King of the South"; another actor, Li Wanchun, was better known in northern China.

Zhang's uncle, who specialized in playing Zhu Bajie, had the stage name "Qi Ling Tong" (七龄童; 七齡童; Qī Líng Tóng; 'Seven Year Old Child'). Zhang's elder brother used the stage name "Xiao Liu Ling Tong" (小六龄童; 小六齡童; Xiǎo Liù Líng Tóng), which means "Little Six Year Old Child", or "Six Year Old Child, Junior". The role of Sun Wukong was originally offered to Zhang's elder brother, but because his brother died of leukemia in 1966, Zhang inherited his father's legacy instead. He changed his stage name slightly, to "Liu Xiao Ling Tong", which still means "Little Six Year Old Child".

As a dedication to the memory of his elder brother, Zhang put great effort into playing the role of Sun Wukong well. He also helped people affected by leukemia. In 1992, China Central Television produced an eight-episode television series titled Hou Wa (猴娃; 'monkey child') about Zhang's life.

== Career ==
Zhang gained international fame for his starring role as the Monkey King (Sun Wukong) in the 1986 television series Journey to the West, adapted from the classic Chinese novel of the same title. Zhang's compelling performance, which was greatly praised by critics, helped him win the Best Actor award at the 6th Golden Eagle Awards in 1988. After that, he also appeared in other films and television series, such as New Year's Day (《过年》). On September 27, 2006, he was conferred the Certificate of Mouthpiece of the 3rd International Forum of the China Cultural Industry.

Zhang reprised his role as Sun Wukong in Wu Cheng'en and Journey to the West, a 2010 television series about Wu Cheng'en—the author of Journey to the West—and his inspiration for writing the novel. Zhang also simultaneously portrayed Wu Cheng'en.

== Filmography ==
=== Film ===
Year	English Title	Chinese Title	Role	Notes	Ref.
1981	The True Story of Ah Q	阿Q正传	The revolutionist		
1991	At Love-Corner in Weekend	周末恋爱角	Du Dachuan		
1991	New Year's Day	过年	Cheng Zhi		
1991	The Extra	喜剧明星	The journalist		
1992	Good Luck	祝你好运	Director Zhang		
1994		青春的忏悔	The doctor		
2017	Buddies in India	大闹天竺	Wu Shen		
TBA		一带一路·重走玄奘路	Xuanzang; Himself	Also director	
TBA	Miser	财迷	Mr. Hao		
TBA	Journey to the West 3D	敢问路在何方	Sun Wukong		

=== Television ===
Year	English Title	Chinese title	Role	Notes
1986	Journey to the West	西游记	Sun Wukong	
1993	Monkey Child	猴娃	Liu Lingtong	
1994		大上海屋檐下	Yan Shipeng	
1997		双筒望远镜	Father	
2000		追踪309	Luo Dapeng	
2000		1939·恩来回故里	Zhou Enlai	
2000	Journey to the West	西游记续集	Sun Wukong	
2001	The Pearl King	义海风云	Li Zhengping	
2002		某年某月某一天	The doctor	
2004	The Story Of Three loves	啼笑姻缘	Guan Shoufeng	
2005	Lian Cheng Jue (A Deadly Secret)	连城诀	Hua Tiegan	
2005	The Delighted Seven Fairies	欢天喜地七仙女	Taishang Laojun	
2006	Xun Huisheng	荀慧生	Wang Yaoqing	
2007	Legend of He Long	贺龙传奇	Zhou Enlai	
2009	War and Peace over Peking	北平战与和	Hu Shih	
2010	Wu Cheng'en and Journey to the West	吴承恩与西游记	Wu Cheng'en	
2013	Chivalous Robber Lee-San	新燕子李三	Li Xian	
2015	Dare Stone Male Tiandong	石敢当之雄峙天东	Jade Emperor	

== Personal life ==
On June 12, 1988, Zhang married Yu Hong (于虹), a staff of China Central Television, in Beijing. Their daughter, Zhang Tongtong (章同童), was born in November 1990.

=== Views ===
Zhang's activities mainly focus on promoting Sun Wukong in popular culture. Zhang expressed his concern over more contemporary Sun Wukong portrayals. While Zhang stated that he was happy to see Journey to the West, as well as other Chinese classical novels, receiving increased attention from foreign directors, he emphasized that "such adaptation has to be based on adequate knowledge of Chinese culture" and that "the Monkey King is not King Kong". Zhang believes that Goku from Dragon Ball does not portray the Chinese style of Sun Wukong.

== Awards ==
Year	Nominated work	Award	Result	Notes
1988	Journey to the West	6th Golden Eagle Television Awards: Best Actor	Won	
1994	Monkey Child	12th Golden Eagle Television Awards: Best Supporting Actor	Won	
