= Wu Cheng'en =

16th-century Chinese novelist and poet

- 吳承恩
- Born: 1500 or 1505; Huai'an, Jiangsu, China
- Died: 1582 (aged 81–82); 1580 (aged 74–75); Huai'an, Jiangsu, China
- Education: Longxi Academy
- Occupations: Novelist; poet; politician
- Notable work: Journey to the West

Chinese name
- Traditional Chinese: 吳承恩
- Simplified Chinese: 吴承恩
Transcriptions
Standard Mandarin
- Hanyu Pinyin: Wú Chéng'ēn
- Wade–Giles: Wu^{2} Ch‘êng^{2}-ên^{1}
- IPA: [ǔ ʈʂʰə̌ŋ.ə́n]
Yue: Cantonese
- Yale Romanization: ǹgh sìhng yān
- Jyutping: Ng4 Sing4 Jan1
Southern Min
- Tâi-lô: Ngôo Sîn-in (col.); Ngôo Sîng-un (lit.)

Ruzhong
- Chinese: 汝忠
Transcriptions
Standard Mandarin
- Hanyu Pinyin: Rǔzhōng

Sheyang Shanren
- Traditional Chinese: 射陽山人
- Simplified Chinese: 射阳山人
Transcriptions
Standard Mandarin
- Hanyu Pinyin: Shèyáng Shānrén

Wu Cheng'en (traditional Chinese: 吳承恩; simplified Chinese: 吴承恩; pinyin: Wú Chéng'ēn; Wade–Giles: Wu^{2} Ch‘êng^{2}-ên^{1}; Jyutping: Ng^{4} Sing^{4} Jan^{1}, c. 1500 – 1582 or 1505–1580), courtesy name Ruzhong (汝忠), was a Chinese novelist, poet, and politician during the Ming dynasty. He is considered by many to be the author of Journey to the West, one of the Classic Chinese Novels.

== Biography ==
Wu was born in Lianshui, Jiangsu province, and later moved to Huai'an. Wu's father, Wu Rui, had a good primary education and "shown an aptitude for study", but ultimately spent his life as an artisan because of his family's financial difficulties. Nevertheless, Wu Rui continued to "devote himself to literary pursuits", and as a child, Wu acquired the same enthusiasm for literature—including classical literature, popular stories, and anecdotes.

He took the imperial examinations several times in attempt to become a mandarin, or imperial official, but never passed, and did not gain entry into the imperial university in Nanjing until middle age; after that he did become an official and had postings in both Beijing and Changxing County, but he did not enjoy his work, and eventually resigned, probably spending the rest of his life writing stories and poems in his hometown. During this time he became an accomplished writer, producing both poetry and prose, and became friends with several prominent contemporary writers. However, Wu remained poor throughout his life and did not have any children. Dissatisfied with the political climate of the time and with the corruption of the world, he spent much of his life as a hermit.

== Literary work ==
=== Journey to the West ===
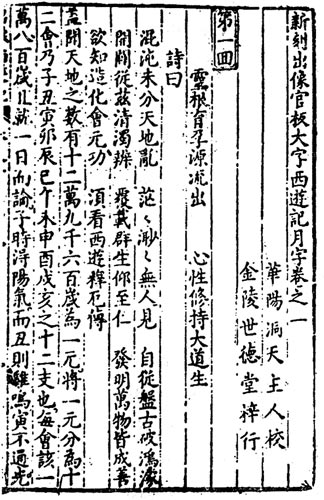
A page from the earliest-known edition of Journey to the West, in woodblock print, 16th century

Wu's likely authorship of Journey to the West is his main claim to fame. The novel was published anonymously in 1592, and Wu did not refer to the work in any of his other writings. Wu is thought to have published the work in anonymity, as was usual at the time, because of the ill repute of fiction as vulgar literature. There was a trend in Chinese literary circles to imitate the classical literature of the Qin, Han, and Tang dynasties, written in Classical Chinese. However, late in life, Wu went against this trend by writing the novel, Journey to the West, in the vernacular tongue. For over three centuries most of China remained unaware of its authorship, although the people of his hometown attributed the novel to him early on.

However, in the early 20th century, Hu Shih and his students conducted textual analysis and research into Qing dynasty records and suggested Wu as the author. In his Introduction to Arthur Waley's abridgment, Monkey, Dr. Hu, then ambassador to the United States, reported that a 1625 gazetteer, a form of local history, from Wu's hometown claimed Wu as the author. The Dictionary of Ming Biography comments that "the identity of the author of the novel is thus still open to question," and that Wu "probably would have remained in oblivion had it not been for this probably erroneous ascription."

Brown University China literature scholar David Lattimore said: "The Ambassador's confidence was quite unjustified. What the gazetteer says is that Wu wrote something called The Journey to the West. It mentions nothing about a novel. The work in question could have been any version of our story, or something else entirely." Translator W. J. F. Jenner points out that although Wu had knowledge of Chinese bureaucracy and politics, the novel itself doesn't include any political details that "a fairly well-read commoner could not have known." Furthermore, it is unknown how much of the novel was created, and how much was simply compiled and edited, since much of the legend behind Journey to the West already existed in folk tales.

Anthony C. Yu, in his introduction to his complete translation, states that the identity of the author, as with so many other major works of Chinese fiction, "remains unclear" but that Wu remains "the most likely" author.

=== Other works ===
In addition to Journey to the West, Wu wrote numerous poems and stories (including the novel A Record of the Tripods of Emperor Yu 禹鼎记, which includes a preface by Wu), although most have been lost. Some of his work survives because, after his death, a family member gathered as many manuscripts as he could find and compiled them into four volumes, entitled Remaining Manuscripts of Mr. Sheyang 射阳先生存稿. Some of his poetry was included in contemporary anthologies such as A Digest of Ming Poetry and A Record of Ming Poetry.

Both his poetry and his prose have been described as "stubborn" and critical of society's corruption, and in one of his few surviving poems Wu describes himself as having a "defiant spirit". Wu's poetry focused on the expression of emotions, and for this reason his work has been compared to that of Li Bai, although even the poems that he published with his name attached still were not quite modeled on the classical styles (although they were not as "vulgar" as Journey to the West). In addition to using his writing to critique society, Wu also took pride in the worldly nature of his work, as opposed to the more fantastic writings of some contemporaries; in the preface to A Record of the Tripods of Emperor Yu (禹鼎志) he wrote, "My book does not just deal with the supernatural; it deals with the foibles of men too."
