= List of media adaptations of Journey to the West =

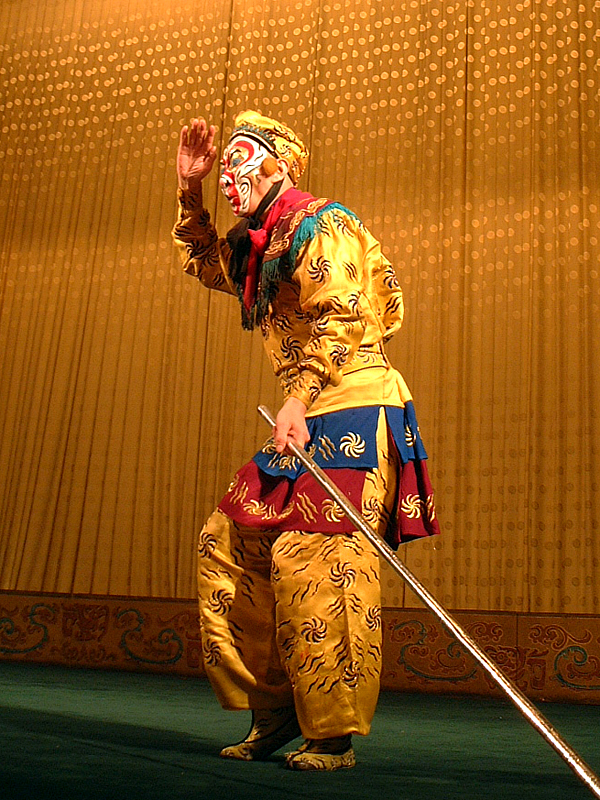
A scene from a Beijing opera depicting Sun Wukong of the Forbidden Temple

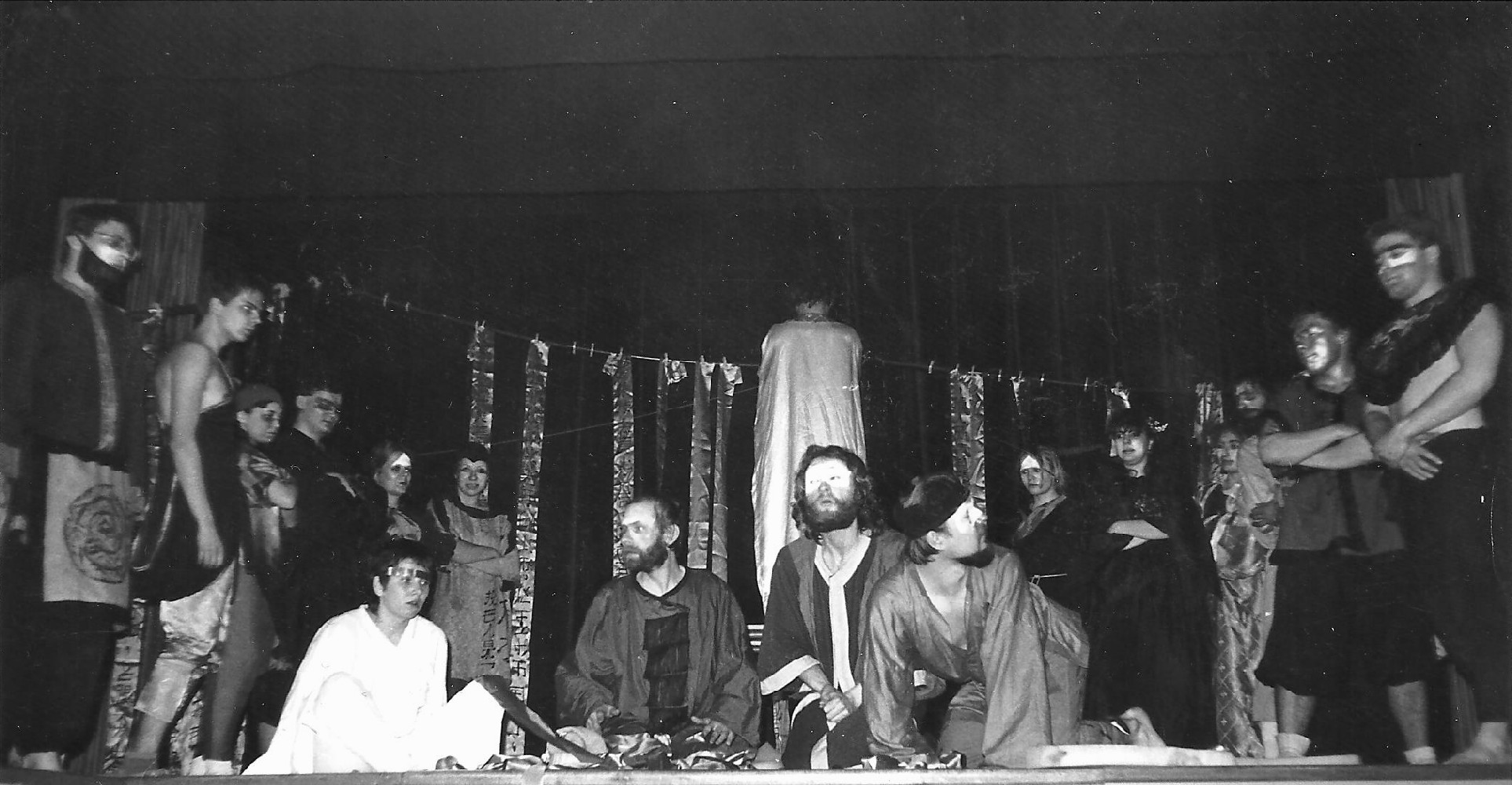
The pilgrims Sun Wukong, Tang Sanzang, Zhu Bajie, and Sha Wujing at Western Paradise in production The Monkey Sun (Theatre Esence, 1984)

Journey to the West, one of the Four Great Classical Novels of Chinese literature, was written in the 16th century and attributed to Wu Cheng'en. Stories and characters were widely used, especially in Beijing opera, and the novel has been adapted many times in modern film, television, stage, and other media.

== Visual Art ==
- The Japanese artist Tsukioka Yoshitoshi published a series of prints in 1865 titled Tsûzoku saiyûki (A Modern Journey to the West).
- San Francisco Bay Area artists from the Art Builds Community, with co-curator Caitlin Pambid, exhibited an art installation with artworks inspired by the San Francisco Opera's The Monkey King (see below) open only to opera ticket holders. The installation was held in the War Memorial Opera House from November 14 through December 1, 2025. The artists represented were: Alexandra Luong, Cindy Duong, Eva Agus (website) (exhibition art piece), jellyfshjamz, Jessica Chen Fan, Liz Scotta, Lost Artworks, Monkey Boy Illustrations, Nellie Wong & Andi Wong, Sherry Yuan, Watercrystal Jade, Y. Sharon Peng.

== Stage plays ==
- The Monkey Sun (Opičák Sun), a 1984 production adapting several chapters from the novel by the Theatre Esence in Prague, Czechoslovakia.
- Amazing Adventures of the Marvelous Monkey King, a 2001 children's play by Elizabeth Wong.
- The Monkey King, a 2005 production by the Children's Theatre Company in Minneapolis, Minnesota.
- Journey to the West: The Musical, a stage musical which received its world premiere at the New York Musical Theatre Festival on 25 September 2006.
- Monkey: Journey to the West, a stage musical version created by Chen Shi-Zheng, Damon Albarn and Jamie Hewlett. It premiered as part of the Manchester International Festival at the Palace Theatre on 28 June 2007.
- Mary Zimmerman, Introduction by Anthony C. Yu, Journey to the West: A Play (Northwestern University Press, 2011).
- Monkey: A Journey to the West, a live storytelling by Sebastian Lockwood of the New Hampshire Institute of Art, presented in February 2012.
- Dramatica ACT 1: Journey to the West - The Eternal Legend, a 2021 stage musical produced by Frontier Works.
- Buddha and the Monkey King, an English-language opera by Hong Kong composer Anna Vienna Ho which received its world premiere at The Cockpit in London, as part of the Tête à Tête: The Opera Festival 2020.
- The Monk of the River, an English-language opera by Hong Kong composer Anna Vienna Ho which received its world premiere at The Cockpit in London, as part of the Tête à Tête: The Opera Festival 2021.
- The Monster of Gao Village, an English-language opera by Hong Kong composer Anna Vienna Ho which received its world premiere at The Cockpit in London, as part of the Tête à Tête: The Opera Festival 2023.
- The Monkey King (Chinese title: Houwang Wukong 猴王悟空), an opera by Huang Ruo (composer) and David Henry Hwang (librettist). The opera is in English and Mandarin. It received its world premiere at the San Francisco Opera on November 14, 2025. The opera was a San Francisco Opera Debut and New San Francisco Opera Production, commissioned by the Chinese Heritage Foundation of Minnesota.

== Films ==
- The Cave of the Silken Web, or Pan Si Dong, a 1927 silent adaptation of one chapter of the novel. It was followed by a 1930 sequel, The Cave of the Silken Web II (alternatively known as Spiders II).
- Enoken's Sun Wukong (1940), directed by Kajirō Yamamoto.
- Princess Iron Fan, a 1941 liberal adaptation of a short sequence from Journey to the West; the first Chinese animated feature film.
- Monkey Sun, a 1959 Japanese film produced by Toho, released as Sun Wukong in Japan, as The Adventures of Sun Wu Kung in the United States, and as Monkey Sun internationally.
- Shanghai Animation Film Studio produced several animated films based on chapters from Journey to the West:
  - Havoc in Heaven, also known as Uproar in Heaven, is a 1961 Chinese animated feature film directed by Wan Lai-ming and produced by Wan and his three brothers. In 2012 it was "restored" in 3D.
  - 人參果 (Ren Shen Guo), a 1981 Chinese animated film directed by Yan Ding Xian, in English known as Ginseng Fruit (also known as Stealing (the) Ginseng Fruit and "Monkey King and Fruit of Immortality")
  - 金猴降妖 (Jinhou jiang yao / Jin hou xiang yao), The Monkey King Conquers the Demon, a 1985 Chinese animated film directed by Te Wei. in English known as "Monkey (King) Conquers the (white bone) Demon" or "Golden Monkey Subdued the Evil" or "Golden Monkey Conquers the Evil".
- Alakazam the Great, a retelling of the first part of the story based on the characters designed by Osamu Tezuka. It was one of the first anime films produced by Toei Animation.
- 1960s Hong Kong film series produced by the Shaw Brothers Studio and directed by Ho Meng-hua:
  - Monkey Goes West (1966)
  - Princess Iron Fan (1966), adapting two chapters from the novel.
  - Cave of the Silken Web (1967)
  - The Land of Many Perfumes (1968)
- Battles With The Red Boy, 1972 Taiwanese film
- The Fantastic Magic Baby, a 1975 Hong Kong film directed by Chang Cheh.
- Monkey King with 72 Magic, a 1979 Taiwanese film directed and produced by Fu Ching-Wa, telling the story from the birth of Sun Wukong to his imprisonment by Buddha.
- Doraemon: The Record of Nobita's Parallel Visit to the West is based on Journey to the West. It is the 9th feature-length Doraemon film, which was released in 1988. In the film, the monsters of the Journey to the West video game are released in the real world. Nobita and his friends become characters of Journey to the West and fight against the monsters to restore the peace.
- New Pilgrims to the West, a 1982 Taiwanese movie directed by Chan Jun-Leung. A sequel, Monkey War, was released the same year.
- Go West to Subdue Demons, a 1992 movie directed by Chang Cheh.
- A Chinese Odyssey, a two-part 1995 Hong Kong fantasy comedy film loosely based on the novel starring Stephen Chow as Sun Wukong.
  - A Chinese Odyssey Part Three is a 2016 Chinese-Hong Kong fantasy comedy film and the threequel to A Chinese Odyssey, starring Han Geng as Sun Wukong.
- Heavenly Legend, a 1998 Taiwanese film by Tai Seng Entertainment that is partially based on the novel.
- A Chinese Tall Story (2005), a Hong Kong comedy film loosely based on the novel, starring Bolin Chen as Sun Wukong.
- Fire Ball, a 2005 Taiwanese animated feature film made by Wang Film Productions and directed by Wong Tung.
- Saiyūki, also known as Monkey Magic: The Movie and Adventures of the Super Monkey, is a Japanese feature film produced by Fuji Television, released in Japan on 14 July 2007. The film was made in lieu of a second season of the 2006 television series by the same name. The film was a box office success, becoming the 8th highest-grossing film of 2007 in Japan.
- Monkey King vs. Er Lang Shen is a 2007 CG Chinese animated film produced by Yuan Cheng depicting Sun Wukong's fight against Erlang Shen.
- The Forbidden Kingdom is a 2008 Chinese-American fantasy-adventure martial arts film featuring Jet Li as Sun Wukong.
- Journey to the West: Conquering the Demons is a 2013 Hong Kong comedy film loosely based on the novel directed by Stephen Chow and stars Huang Bo as Sun Wukong.
  - Journey to the West: The Demons Strike Back is a sequel to Journey to the West: Conquering the Demons, produced by Stephen Chow and directed by Tsui Hark, which stars Lin Gengxin as Sun Wukong.
- The Monkey King is a 2014 Chinese-Hong Kong film directed by Cheang Pou-soi and stars Donnie Yen as Sun Wukong. The movie depicts Wukong's rebellion against Heaven.
  - The Monkey King 2 is a 2016 sequel to the 2014 Chinese-Hong Kong film The Monkey King directed by Cheang Pou-soi and stars Aaron Kwok as Sun Wukong, replacing Donnie Yen from the prequel film.
  - The Monkey King 3, a 2018 sequel and director Cheang Pou-soi's third installment in his Monkey King series, follows Sun Wukong, Tang Sanzang, Zhu Bajie and Sha Wujing, where they travel to the Country of Women, also starring Aaron Kwok as Sun Wukong, reprising his role from the second film.
- Monkey King: Hero Is Back is a 2015 Chinese animation film directed by first time director Tian Xiaopeng. The film is based on the story of Sun Wukong, where he fights a powerful source of evil after being freed from his seal. As of 2015, it was the highest grossing Chinese animated film.
- In New Gods: Nezha Reborn, Li Yunxiang (who is the reincarnation of Nezha) meets with a masked man who he believes is the Six-Eared Macaque, who turns out to be the legendary Sun Wukong and offers to teach him how to control his powers to fight against Ao Bing and his father the Dragon of the East Ao Guang.
- Spark: A Space Tail shows similarities to the novel such as Sun Wukong, Vix who fills in as Tang Sanzang, Chunk as Zhu Bajie and the Flagship Captain as Sha Wujing.
- Surprise is a low-budget 2015 Chinese fantasy comedy film directed by Show Joy. It had wide previews on 12 and 13 December and was released on 18 December 2015.
- Dream Journey is a 2016 Chinese comedy film. Followed by Dream Journey 2: Princess Iron Fan (2017), Dream Journey 3: The Land of Many (2017), Dream Journey 4: Biography of Demon, Dream Journey 5: Legendary Treasure (2019) and Dream Journey 6:Tian Mang Shen Quan (2019). Produced by Zhejiang Meishi Zhongle Media.
- Wu Kong stars Eddie Peng as Sun Wukong and Ni Ni as his lover, Zixia
- Two Princesses, Journey to the West (2017) a film directed by Jia Kai.
- Buddies in India (2017) a comedy film, starring Wang Baoqiang as Sun Wukong.
- Monkey King Reborn, a 2021 CGI film, loosely based on chapters 24 to 26 of Journey to the West, revolving around the Ginseng fruit (人參樹). The film follows Sun Wukong and his companions having to rescue Tang Sanzang from the King of Demons who took him as revenge for his imprisonment.
- The Journey to the West: Demon's Child, a live action film which centers around Red Boy, who has been eroded by the Heavenly Fire since he was in the womb, resulting him to become a demon. Years later he was tasked by the Gray Wolf Monster to capture Tang Sanzang in exchange for treasure for his mother Princess Iron Fan, however he has to get past Sun Wukong first.
- In the 2023 animated Netflix film The Monkey King, the trickster monkey embarks on a quest for immortality with the help of a young girl name Lin, however the Dragon King wants revenge on the Sun Wukong for stealing his magical column, now becoming his golden staff.
- The 2025 animated film Nobody follows a group of low-level spirits who pretend to be the travelling group from Journey to the West in an attempt to beat them to Buddha's scrolls. Although a comedy, it fits into the canonical story, taking place before the showdown at Little Thunderclap Mountain. Sun Wukong and the other characters appear in the film's final scenes, and play a small but pivotal role in the conclusion.

== Television series ==
- Monkey (Saiyūki), a 1978–1980 Japanese television series based on Journey to the West. It was translated into English by the BBC.
- Journey to the West, a two-season television series produced by CCTV, starring Liu Xiao Ling Tong as Sun Wukong. The two seasons were released in 1986 and 1999 respectively. Noted for its faithfulness to the original novel, this series is still considered by many as a classic.
- Fly! Superboard (날아라 슈퍼보드), a 1990–2002 South Korean animated television series produced by KBS. It adapts the story into a modern setting where Mister Son (Sun Wukong) rides a flying skateboard and fights with a pair of magical nunchaku, Palgye (Zhu Bajie) drives a bazooka-firing motorcycle, and Saojeong (Sha Wujing) uses a squeaky hammer and water gun. It became one of the most popular animated series in South Korean television history, setting record-high ratings during its run.
- Journey to the West, 新・西遊記, a 1994 Japanese television series. Nippon TV produced another television series, based on Journey to the West, titled New Monkey, it ran for only one season.
- Journey to the West, a 1996 Hong Kong television series produced by TVB, starring Dicky Cheung as Sun Wukong. It was followed by a 1998 sequel, Journey to the West II, starring Benny Chan as Sun Wukong.
- Xi You Ji is a 1999 Chinese animated series which was broadcast on CCTV. The whole series was later released on a 26-disc VCD set. The show was later dubbed into English and edited by Cinar (now known as Cookie Jar Entertainment) and was titled Journey to the West: Legends of the Monkey King. It first aired on Teletoon in Canada and was originally shown on the Cookie Jar Toons block on This TV in the United States from 2009 to 2010.
- Journey to the West Afterstory (西游记后传), is a 2000 Chinese television sequel series that is loosely based on the events that take place after Journey to the West. It is produced by Shaanxi Television. The main story centers around a quest to find seventeen magical relics before demons use them to take over heaven and earth.
- The Monkey King, also called The Lost Empire, a 2001 television adaptation of the legend by Sci Fi Channel.
- The Monkey King: Quest for the Sutra, a 2002 Hong Kong television series loosely based on the novel. It was produced by TVB and starred Dicky Cheung as Sun Wukong again.
- In Jackie Chan Adventures, Monkey King (voiced by Bill Tanzer and Billy West in Season 3) is a mystical trickster that was sealed within a wooden puppet that can only free him if someone pulls its leg, which would then turn the victim to a puppet. First appearing in "I'll Be a Monkey's Puppet", Jackie buys the puppet from his uncle's competitor so Jade would use it for her school's talent show, unfortunately he pulled its leg and freed Monkey King and turned himself into a puppet. Luckily Jade use the Rat Talisman to give him life and set out to find the prankster, Uncle and Tohru found out by his competitor that in order to turn Jackie back to normal and trap Monkey King again is for the latter to pull his leg (no matter if it is attached). They successfully manage to trick the trickster in a lumber yard and leave it in the rubble.
- Saiyūki, a 2006 Japanese television series produced by Fuji Television. The lead character of Son Goku (Sun Wukong) was given to Shingo Katori, a member of the pop group SMAP. This remake broke viewing records, with one in three Japanese viewers watching each episode of the series.
- Wu Cheng'en and Journey to the West, a 2010 Chinese television series which tells the story of Wu Cheng'en and his inspiration for writing the novel. The main cast from the 1986 Journey to the West version reprised their roles in this series.
- Journey to the West, a 2010 Chinese television series directed and produced by Cheng Lidong, starring Fei Zhenxiang as Sun Wukong. It started airing on Zhejiang Satellite TV on 14 February 2010.
- Journey to the West, a 2011 Chinese television series produced by Zhang Jizhong, starring Wu Yue as Sun Wukong. It started airing on Southern Television Guangdong on 28 July 2011.
- Into the Badlands, a 2015 television series produced by AMC and written by Miles Millar and Alfred Gough. It is loosely based on Journey to the West.
- New Journey to the West, a 2015 South Korean variety show produced by cable channel tvN and Naver. It is directed by Producer Na.
- A Chinese Odyssey: Love of Eternity, also known as A Chinese Odyssey: Love You a Million Years, a 2017 Chinese series that is based on the movies in A Chinese Odyssey. The series ran for 54 episodes.
- A Korean Odyssey, a South Korean drama produced by Studio Dragon Corporation and JS Pictures. It aired on tvN on 23 December 2017.
- The New Legends of Monkey, a 2018 Australian-New Zealand television co-produced by ABC ME, TVNZ, and Netflix.
- Till We Meet Again, a 2018 Singaporean television series produced by MediaCorp Channel 8, starring Taiwanese actor Kingone Wang, and MediaCorp actors Ian Fang, Julie Tan and Elvin Ng, premiered on 26 November. A Toggle-produced prelude series, it aired on Channel 8 on 11 October.
- Journey to the West Children's Edition (Tian Zhen Pai Xi You Ji), a 2019 series by Tencent.
- Sun Wukong (voiced by James Sie) appears as a character in the Amazon series Kung Fu Panda: The Paws of Destiny, based on the popular DreamWorks franchise. This depiction is based more on his shapeshifting powers and trickster attitude, relying on confusing enemies with mind games and deception. However, his enemy Baigujing (translated into White Bone Demon and voiced by Elisa Gabrielli) also makes an appearance as the main antagonist of the second half of Season 1, manipulating the Emperor's adoptive daughter (who had become jealous of the Emperor's younger biological daughter taking attention away from her) into murdering him and creating an army of animated Terracotta soldiers, and later constructing a giant automaton to take over as her new body.
- RWBY, a web-series created by Monty Oum and produced by Rooster Teeth, has a character named Sun Wukong who is inspired by his namesake from Journey to the West. He is depicted as a Faunus, a humanoid that resembles a human but born with animal characteristics.
- In Miraculous Ladybug, those who wield the Monkey Miraculous (previously wielded in universe by Sun Wukong and Sasuke Sarutobi) turn into a hero with numerous references to Sun Wukong. Once activated, the wielder gains use of a staff known as Ruyi Jingu Bang and his main ability Uproar (letting him create toys that, if they hit an opponent, cause their powers to malfunction) can be seen as a reference to his mischievous attitude in the original work.
- MegaMan NT Warrior, in the episode 42 (32 in the American dub) presents the main characters playing the characters of Journey to the West.
- Monkie Kid, a LEGO animated spin-off series taking place decades after the original story.
- An episode of The Librarians has Jacob Stone traveling to Shangri-La to be taught martial arts by the Monkey King (played by Ernie Reyes Jr.).
- American Born Chinese, a 2023 Disney+ series adaptation of the graphic novel of the same name, starring Michelle Yeoh and Ke Huy Quan.

== Comics and animation ==
- Journey to the West: Legends of the Monkey King is a popular 1999 animated series produced by China Central Television and the Quebec-based CINAR Corporation.
- Adventures from China: Monkey King, a 20-volume comic series by Wei Dong Chen.
- American Born Chinese by Gene Luen Yang features the legend of the Monkey King throughout the book. He uses the story of the Monkey King's quest to become equal to a god to parallel the feelings of the main character, a Chinese immigrant, who is struggling to fit into American society.
- A 1983 quasi-comic book adaptation of one of the stories from Journey to the West, in which Monkey King confronts a doppelganger, was published in China, under the English title The Real and the Fake Monkey, by Zhang Cheng, with full-page drawings by illustrator and painter Zheng Jiasheng. It was later published in 1987 in Poland, as Opowieść o Małpie prawdziwej i Małpie nieprawdziwej (The Tale of the True Monkey and the False Monkey).
- Digimon has several Digimon modeled after Journey to the West characters. Gokuumon is based on Sun Wukong, Sanzomon is based on Xuanzang, Cho-Hakkaimon is based on Zhu Bajie, and Shawujinmon is based on Sha Wujing.
- A four-part arc in season 2 of Dinosaur King is based around the main characters' time machine landing them in Ancient China and meeting Xuanzang (named "Sanzo Hoshi"). Through their adventure to find a mystical Cosmos Stone, hidden behind a stone door only Sanzo can chant into opening, the three realize that they themselves would become the inspirations for Sanzo's companions from Journey to the West.
- The God of High School, a Korean manhwa/game, with protagonist Jin Mori as the Monkey King Sun Wukong.
- Dragon Ball was inspired by Journey to the West. For example, Sun Wukong (pronounced Son Gokū in Japanese) becomes "Son Goku", who wields an elongating staff weapon, can fly using a magic cloud and has the ability to change into a giant ape. The supporting character Oolong was also based on Zhu Bajie and it was said that Yamcha was based on Sha Wujing. The object of sutras are replaced by the seven "Dragon Balls" and the dragon "Shen Long" who appears from the Dragon Balls to grant a wish. The first arc is a loose adaptation of Journey to the West, while following arcs diverge and tell original stories.
- Gokū no Daibōken, a 1967 Japanese anime.
- The Karma Saiyuki (Iyashite Agerun Saiyūki), a 2007 adult anime.
- Monkey Magic is an animated retelling of the legend.
- Monkey Typhoon is a manga and anime series based on the Journey to the West saga, following a futuristic steampunk-retelling of the legend.
- Osomatsu-kun was a gag manga and anime. In its 1988 animated incarnation, Episodes 64 and 65 are based on Journey to the West.
- Saint is a Hong Kong manhua created by Khoo Fuk-lung and loosely based on Journey to the West.
- Saiyūki is a manga and anime series inspired by the legend. Follow-up series include Saiyūki Gaiden, Saiyūki Ibun and Saiyūki Reload Blast.
- Secret Journey is an erotic doujin by Po-ju that features a travelling priest, a young boy, who encounters a monkey demoness, Son Goku, who becomes his first disciple.
- Shinzo is an anime loosely based on Journey to the West.
- Son-Goku the Monkey
- Science Fiction Saiyuki Starzinger, a 1978-1979 Japanese anime produced by Toei Animation which features a science fiction/space opera reimagination of the story.
- The Ape, a graphic novel by Milo Manara and Silverio Pisu published in 1986 by Catalan Communications. Previously serialized in Heavy Metal in 1983, this is a more adult adaptation of Journey to the West with a preface by Renata Pisu (ISBN 978-0-87416-019-2).
- The Flying Superboard is a Korean animated television series based on Journey to the West.
- The Journey West is a series of illustrated ebooks available for the Kindle and Nook that retell Journey to the West using rhyming verses vaguely reminiscent of Dr. Seuss. Book One: The Monkey King was released in 2011.
- The Monkey King is a dark sword and sorcery manga inspired by the tale.
- XIN is an American comic miniseries produced by Anarchy Studio.
- The play in Love Hina episode 16 is also based on Journey to the West.
- Episode 31 of Yo-Kai Watch has the characters kidnapped by a yokai and forced to act out the events of Journey of the West.
- Monkey King, an animated series created in 2009 by China Central Television (CCTV). It was honored with the Golden Panda Award at the 10th Sichuan TV Festival in China.
- Monkey Khan from Sonic the Hedgehog (Archie Comics) comics is loosely based on Sun Wukong.
- Oboro Shirakumo's quirk Cloud from My Hero Academia is a reference to Sun Wukong.
- Monty the Magic Monkey (小悟空; 1988, TVB) is a children's animation about Little WuKong adventures post-Journey to the West falling from heavens to live with a Hong Kong family.
- Some of Doraemon's items are based on Journey to the West, such as Clone Liquid Goku, Kinto food and Goku ring.
- Omniscient Reader's Viewpoint makes reference to one of the constellations being the Monkey King from Journey to the West, and features other characters of the story.
- Fucking Journey to the West by Akairo Mash is a 2019 boy's love webtoon based on Journey to the West, where Monkey is stabbed by his girlfriend and is reincarnated, and his staff is recharged by having sex with Tripitaka, the (male) monk.
- Overly Sarcastic Productions has an ongoing animated summary series of Journey to the West.
- The Maiden and the Monkey is a ongoing Webtoon based off the Journey to the West, but retold through a romance fantasy lens with the main character being the daughter of the fearsome Jade Emperor who has fallen for the Monkey King.

== Music ==
- Between 2005 and 2007, the American composer Barry Schrader created a four-part electro-acoustic composition cycle, Monkey King, which was named after the deeds of Sun Wukong.
- The 2008 album Journey to the West is the soundtrack to the musical stageplay Monkey: Journey to the West. It was composed by the English musician Damon Albarn with the UK Chinese Ensemble. The soundtrack itself is only based upon, but not a direct recording of the musical.
- In 2023, the South Korean band Seventeen released a song titled 손오공 (Sonogong, English title: Super), which is the Korean name for Sun Wukong. The song contains multiple references to Sun Wukong's powers, including his ability to fly on clouds and his Ruyi Jingu Bang.

== Dance ==
- Shen Yun Performing Arts has featured several vignettes from Journey to the West in its dance productions, which tour internationally. These include "The Monkey King Triumphs" and "Monkey King Captures Pigsy".
- Pilobolus staged a dance-theatre work entitled Monkey and the White Bone Demon in 2001. The piece, created by choreographer Alison Chase, one of the founders of Pilobolus, was based on a children's book adaptation of a tale from Journey to the West and featured dancer Matt Kent performing on stilts (as the Demon). The piece, which toured internationally and was critically acclaimed, is also the subject of a thirty-minute "making of" documentary film. Alison Chase has since revived Monkey and the White Bone Demon with her subsequent dance company, Alison Chase Performance.

== Books referencing the novel ==
- Xiyoubu (西遊補; A Supplement to the Journey to the West) is a Ming Dynasty addendum to Journey to the West written by Dong Yue in 1640. The novel describes events which occurred between chapters 61 and 62 of Journey to the West.
- The Monkey King is the 1978 debut novel of British novelist Timothy Mo, whose protagonist mirrors the personality of Sun Wukong, the Monkey King.
- Tripmaster Monkey is a 1989 novel by Chinese American novelist Maxine Hong Kingston, with widespread references to Journey to the West.
- Gene Luen Yang's graphic novel American Born Chinese uses the legend of the Monkey King as a major metaphor throughout the book. He uses the Monkey King's quest to become equal to a god to compare the feelings of the main character, a Chinese immigrant, who is struggling to fit into American society.
- In the children's novel Michael and the Monkey King by Alan James Brown, the Monkey King's mythical journey to the west becomes a modern-day quest to save the lives of a young boy's parents.
- The Monkey King's Daughter is a series of books by Todd DeBonis for young readers, about the adventures of Meilin Cheng, a 14-year-old Asian-American girl who learns she is the daughter of Sun Wukong.
- The Dark Heavens, Journey to Wudang and Celestial Battle series are fantasy novels by Kylie Chan in which Sun Wukong is a frequently occurring character.
- In Kim Stanley Robinson's novel The Years of Rice and Salt, the first chapter (entitled "Awake to Emptiness") is presented in the style of Journey to the West. The protagonist of that chapter, a Mongol warrior named Bold, is an incarnation of Monkey.
- Mark Salzman's second book The Laughing Sutra (1991) partially re-imagines the Journey to the West in the context of late 20th century Chinese history. A young man, Hsun-ching, sets out to recover a lost sutra and gains a strange-looking companion, ″the colonel″, who claims extremely long life and carries a metal staff. Stories of the Monkey King and Chinese heroes are referenced throughout.
- Pu Songling writes of Sun Wukong in "The Great Sage, Heaven's Equal", collected in Strange Tales from a Chinese Studio.
- The Epic Crush of Genie Lo by F.C. Yee a young adult fiction book.
- Girl Giant and the Monkey King follows a Vietnamese-American Thom Ngho and her adventures with the Monkey King. The sequel, Girl Giant and the Jade War, takes place after the Monkey King betrayed Thom.
- The Fallen Hero, written by Katie Zhao. The protagonist, Faryn Liu Falun, gets help from the Monkey King and his weapon, the Ruyi Jingu Bang, to battle the Heaven who have turned against humanity.
- Monkey Around, by Jadie Jang. The protagonist, Maya McQueen, is a young woman with all of the Monkey King's powers, living in San Francisco's Asian American activist scene.
- Omniscient Reader's Viewpoint (전지적 독자 시점) by writer-duo SingShong is a Korean webnovel which features the Prisoner of the Golden Headband, Sun Wukong, as a prominent side character. Its Webtoon adaptation also includes the Monkey King, though not to the extent of the novel.

== Video games ==
- Mighty Monkey, a 1982 arcade game by Yih Lung Enterprises Co Ltd.
- SonSon, a 1984 arcade game by Capcom.
- Ganso Saiyūki: Super Monkey Daibōken is a 1986 NES RPG based on Journey to the West and made popular by GameCenter CX.
- Cloud Master, released in 1988 by Taito for Arcade, NES and Master System.
- China Gate is a 1988 arcade game by Technos Japan Corp. It was based on the original story and characters. The Japanese version is titled Saiyu Gōma Roku (西遊降魔録; "Records of the Demon-Conquering Journey to the West").
- Saiyūki World, a 1988 Japan-exclusive NES game by Jaleco. It was followed by a 1990 sequel, Saiyūki World 2: Tenjōkai no Majin, adapted and released in 1991 as Whomp 'Em.
- Yūyūki, a 1989 text-based adventure video game for the Famicom Disk System and developed by Nintendo.
- In Lunar: Eternal Blue (1994), according to scenario writer Kei Shigema, the concept of an oppressive god came from the image of Sun Wukong being unable to escape from the gigantic palm of the Buddha. Shigema stated that "it was a picture showing the arrogance of a god who is saying, 'In the end, you pathetic humans are in my hands.' The moment I understood that, I thought, 'Oh, I definitely want to do this,' it'll definitely match perfectly. So we used it just like that."
- Journey to the West (Chinese: 西天取经; pinyin: Xītiān Qǔjīng; lit. 'Western Heaven'), is an unlicensed Famicom platform game produced by Taiwanese developer Chengdu Tai Jing Da Dong and published by TXC Corporation in 1994. In 1996, Waixing Technology produced and released its sequel Journey to the West II (Chinese: 西天取经II; pinyin: Xītiān Qǔjīng II; lit. 'Western Heaven II').
- Janyūki: Gokū Randa (雀遊記 悟空乱打) is a Super Famicom game published in 1995 by Virgin Games, in which the protagonists of the novel travel to their destination over a RPG-styled map while battling various opponents in mahjong matches along the way.
- The boss of Yellow Desert Zone in Sonic Blast (1996) is a reference to Sun Wukong.
- Legend of Wukong (1996) is based on Journey to the West.
- Oriental Legend (aka Xi You Shi E Zhuan) is a 1997 2D side-scrolling fighting arcade game with cartoon graphics from International Games System Co., Ltd. Players control versions of one of 5 characters from "Journey to the West": Long-Nui (girl), Ba-Chien (pig-man), Long-Ma, Wu-Kong (humanoid monkey, "monkey king") and Wu-Chin.
- Monkey Magic is a 1999 video game for the PlayStation based on the anime series of the same title.
- Saiyuki: Journey West is a 1999 tactical role-playing game for the PlayStation. It was developed by Koei.
- Ether Saga Odyssey is a MMORPG based on Journey to the West and developed by Beijing Perfect World.
- Enslaved: Odyssey to the West is a multi-platform game developed by Ninja Theory based on a futuristic take on the novel.
- League of Legends, Heroes of Newerth, Dota 2, Paragon, and Smite all have a playable character based on the Monkey King.
- Dota 2 also has an item called the Monkey King Bar which is based on Sun Wukong's weapon, Ruyi Jingu Bang.
- Ori and the Will of the Wisps is a 2020 video game for the Xbox One which Opher is based on Sun Wukong.
- Westward Journey Online II, a MMORPG developed and run by NetEase.
- Puzzle & Dragons has Sun Wukong as a usable God.
- Mega Man: The Wily Wars features the Genesis Unit, 3 Robot Masters called Buster Rod.G, Mega Water.S, and Hyper Storm.H; they are based on Sun Wukong, Sha Wujing, and Zhu Bajie respectively. The last letters in each Robot Master's name refers to the Japanese name of their correlating characters (G for "Gokū", S for "Sa Gojō", and H for "Hakkai").
- West Adventure is a 1994 beat'm up game developed by Panda Entertainment for MS-DOS platform. The game is based on Journey to the West original story and characters.
- Monster Strike has Sun Wukong as a usable Character.
- Shin Megami Tensei IV has Sun Wukong as a usable Demon.
- Persona 5 has Sun Wukong as Ryuji Sakamoto's trickster persona named Seiten Taisei.
- Summoner's War has a monster named Monkey King, the fire version becomes Wukong when awakened.
- RaiRaiGoku is a pachislo slot machine with a Journey to the West theme.
- The Warriors Orochi games feature Sun Wukong as a character. 3 specifically features both the Monkey King and Xuanzang (reimagined as a female dancer) as playable characters. The after-mission cutscene for the mission in which the player unlocks Xuanzang makes many references to the novel, including a conversation between the characters Toyotomi Hideyoshi and Ishikawa Goemon speculating on whose roles from the novel they fill.
- Warframe has a playable character named Wukong.
- Project X Zone has two protagonists named Kogoro Tenzai and Mii Koryuji, they are both based on Sun Wukong and Xuanzang respectively.
- Overwatch, in the seasonal event, Overwatch Year of the Rooster, the characters Winston, Roadhog, Reinhardt and Zenyatta are given alternate outfits that make them look like Sun Wukong, Zhu Bajie, Sha Wujing and Xuanzang.
- The Pokémon franchise contains Chimchar, Monferno and Infernape (Sun Wukong) as well as Grumpig, Tepig, Pignite and Emboar (Zhu Bajie).
- Fortnite Wukong skin released in item shop in season 3.
- Great Sage, Heaven's Equal (齐天大圣), a Chinese language Taiwanese video game for DOS created by Golden Genius.
- Minecraft made a mash-up pack for Chinese mythology with skins mostly from Journey to the West.
- Monkey King: Hero is Back is adapted to a videogame on the PlayStation 4 in 2019 (4 years after the film's release) where one plays as Sun Wukong (renamed Dasheng in the English dub) as he guides Liuer and Pigsy (Zhu Bajie) to fight off Mountain Trolls and other monsters to save the kidnapped children from the clutches of the demon king Hun Dun. Two DLCs were available: Mind Palace, which is set within Sun Wukong's mind sealed inside the Buddha's crystal where he trains himself in a series of obstacles. And Uproar in Heaven, which is before the main story where the monkey king duals against three of the Jade Emperor's greatest warriors, Nezha, Juling Shen and his nephew Erlang Shen.
- Unruly Heroes by Magic Design Studios for the Xbox One, the PS4, the Nintendo Switch and the PC. The player takes control of Wukong, Sanzang, Kihong and Sandmonk going on a journey to retrieve the sacred parchments from fearsome foes like Rhynehard, Skeletosis, Lady White, Chief Chomp, The Hundred-Eyed Demon Lord and King Bull.
- Lego Brawls' 2021 update has content from Monkie Kid with a battle arena of Flower Fruit Mountain and new characters consisting of Monkie Kid, Mei, Mr. Tang, Pigsy, Monkey King, Princess Iron Fan, Red Son, a Bull Clone, Gold and Silver Horn Demons, and the Spider Queen.
- Tokyo Afterschool Summoners, in an event quest called Desert Journey, which adapts the whole story of Journey to the West, in which the protagonist is Xuanzang (in the game he/she is called Sanzang), with the characters Seth, Hanuman and Ganglie representing Sha Wujing, Sun Wukong and Zhu Bajie.
- Black Myth: Wukong is a 2024 Chinese adventure/role playing video game developed by Game Science which depicts Sun Wukong's story, exploits and battles. Before Black Myth, the developers, also made Asura Online, an MMORPG. Both games were inspired by an online novel that was a dark retelling of Journey to the West. Players take on the role of a monkey titled "The Destined One" who is on a quest to collect six relics in order to free Sun Wukong, who was imprisoned in a stone egg by Erlang Shen due to him rebelling against the Heavens once again after rejecting Buddhahood. The Destined One's journey will be perilous as he faces powerful Yaoguai and immortal deities while traversing through six regions.
- One of the new Copy Abilities used in Kirby Star Allies, Staff, is based heavily on Sun Wukong, with Kirby's main weapon being an extending staff (similar to Ruyi Jingu Bang), and his helmet being based on that of Sun Wukong.
- In Suikoden 2 (PSX), main character (Riou) wears circlet and his childhood friend (Jowy) uses staff as weapon. This represent Sun Wukong circlet and Ruyi Jingu Bang.
- In Fate/Grand Order, the character Xuanzang Sanzang, a female version of Tang Sanzang, debuted in the event "Sanzang Coming to the West".
- Rabbids: Party of Legends is a party game where the Rabbids travel themselves to the Journey to the West story thanks to their Time Washing Machine. The Awakened One (Buddha) trapped the washing machine inside a magic bell and task them to retrieve the scared books for him in exchange to return it while also facing off against gods and demons.
- In the 2022 mobile game Dislyte, Tang Xuan is a Legendary Esper with the powers and staff of Sun Wukong. His twin brother, Tang Yun, is given the powers of the Six-Eared Macaque.
- Kung Fu Chaos, a 3rd party fighting game that came out in 2003 for the original Xbox had a characters named "Monkey" (Son Wukong) as one of its selectable fighters.
- In Honor of Kings / King of Glory, a game based on Chinese pantheons, several characters from the novel are added as playable heroes such as Sun Wukong, Tang Sanzang, Zhu Bajie and Bull Demon King (referred to as "Niu Mo"). A skin pack was also added based on the 1986 series.
- In the Kemono Friends multimedia franchise, several characters based Journey to the West characters appear, such as Sun Wukong, White Dragon Horse and Bull Demon King.
- Gokuu Densetsu: Magic Beast Warriors is a 2D fighting game released in 1995 for the Playstation 1 where you play as Son Goku on a journey to save Princess Rice Cake from the clutches of Natataishi with additional characters playable upon defeating them.
- River City Saga: Journey to the West a 2D roguelike beat'em up, sees Kunio in the role of Tang Sanzang, Sha Wujing, Sun Wukong and Zhu Bajie in their travel to Tanjiang, with various characters of the series playing as various Boddhisattva and demons.
- In the 2019 mobile game AFK Arena, Wu Kong is an Ascended Tier Celestial hero who is noted to have landed in the in-game Land of Esperia by accident before being offered a place among the celestials after slaying many of their enemies.
