= List of UK top-ten albums in 2008 =

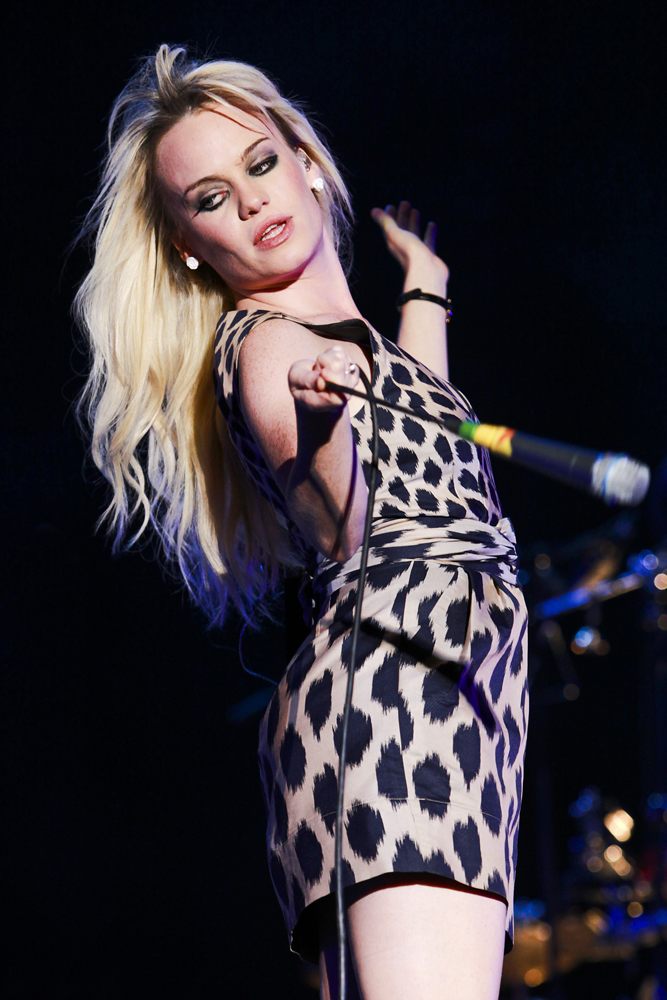
Welsh singer Duffy had the best selling album of 2008 in the UK with Rockferry, which lasted 42 weeks in the top 10 and spent five non-consecutive weeks at number-one.

The UK Albums Chart is one of many music charts compiled by the Official Charts Company that calculates the best-selling albums of the week in the United Kingdom. Since 2004 the chart has been based on the sales of both physical albums and digital downloads. This list shows albums that peaked in the Top 10 of the UK Albums Chart during 2008, as well as albums which peaked in 2007 and 2009 but were in the top 10 in 2008. The entry date is when the album appeared in the top 10 for the first time (week ending, as published by the Official Charts Company, which is six days after the chart is announced).

One-hundred and fifty-eight albums were in the top ten this year. Two albums from 2006 and sixteen albums from 2007 remained in the top 10 for several weeks at the beginning of the year, while I Am... Sasha Fierce by Beyoncé was released in 2008 but did not reach its peak until 2009. Back to Black: Deluxe Edition by Amy Winehouse, Raising Sand by Robert Plant & Alison Krauss and This Is the Life by Amy Macdonald were the albums from 2007 to reach their peak in 2008. Six artists scored multiple entries in the top 10 in 2008. Adele, Chris Brown, Miley Cyrus, OneRepublic and Scouting for Girls were among the many artists who achieved their first UK charting top 10 album in 2008.

The 2007 Christmas number-one album, Spirit, remained at the top spot for the first week of 2008. The first new number-one album of the year was In Rainbows by Radiohead. Overall, thirty-three different albums peaked at number-one in 2008, with thirty-three unique artists hitting that position.

== Background ==
=== Multiple entries ===
One-hundred and fifty-eight albums charted in the top 10 in 2008, with one-hundred and forty-two albums reaching their peak this year (including Gold: Greatest Hits, Piano Man: The Very Best of Billy Joel and The Best of Neil Diamond, which charted in previous years but reached a peak on their latest chart run).

Six artists scored multiple entries in the top 10 in 2008. Amy Winehouse, Michael Jackson, Neil Diamond, Nickelback, Radiohead and Take That were the acts who had two top 10 albums this year. Michael Jackson, Nickelback and Radiohead's two entries were both released this year, with The Best of Neil Diamond by Neil Diamond returning after missing the top 10 when it was first released in 1998 and later in 2006.

=== Chart debuts ===
Forty-eight artists achieved their first top 10 album in 2008 as a lead artist.

The following table (collapsed on desktop site) does not include acts who had previously charted as part of a group and secured their first top 10 solo album, or featured appearances on compilations or other artists recordings.

Artist	Number of top 10s	First entry	Chart position	Other entries
Scouting for Girls	1	Scouting for Girls	1	—
British Sea Power	1	Do You Like Rock Music?	10	—
Lupe Fiasco	1	Lupe Fiasco's The Cool	7	—
Adele	1	19	1	—
Bullet for My Valentine	1	Scream Aim Fire	5	—
Hot Chip	1	Made in the Dark	4	—
One Night Only	1	Started a Fire	10	—
Duffy	1	Rockferry	1	—
OneRepublic	1	Dreaming Out Loud	2	—
Panic! at the Disco	1	Pretty. Odd.	2	—
Foals	1	Antidotes	3	—
Guillemots	1	Red	9	—
Estelle	1	Shine	6	—
The Courteeners	1	St. Jude	4	—
Elliot Minor	1	Elliot Minor	6	—
The Last Shadow Puppets	1	The Age of the Understatement	1	—
Sam Sparro	1	Sam Sparro	4	—
Gabriella Cilmi	1	Lessons to Be Learned	8	—
Scooter	1	Jumping All Over the World	1	—
Pendulum	1	In Silico	2	—
Jay Sean	1	My Own Way	6	—
The Ting Tings	1	We Started Nothing	1	—
Beth Rowley	1	Little Dreamer	6	—
Cistercian Monks of Stift Heiligenkreu	1	Chant – Music for Paradise	7	—
Alphabeat	1	This Is Alphabeat	10	—
Darren Styles	1	Skydivin'	7	—
Sara Bareilles	1	Little Voice	9	—
Sigur Rós	1	Með suð í eyrum við spilum endalaust	5	—
Chris Brown	1	Exclusive	3	—
Jonas Brothers	1	Jonas Brothers	9	—
Seth Lakeman	1	Poor Man's Heaven	8	—
Black Kids	1	Partie Traumatic	5	—
Beck	1	Modern Guilt	9	—
Basshunter	1	Now You're Gone – The Album	1	—
Kid Rock	1	Rock n Roll Jesus	4	—
The Script	1	The Script	1	—
Noah and the Whale	1	Peaceful, the World Lays Me Down	5	—
Monkey	1	Journey to the West	5	—
UK Chinese Ensemble	1	Journey to the West	5	—
Teddy Thompson	1	A Piece of What You Need	10	—
Miley Cyrus	1	Breakout	10	—
Glasvegas	1	Glasvegas	2	—
Queen + Paul Rodgers	1	The Cosmos Rocks	5	—
Andrew Johnston	1	One Voice	4	—
Seasick Steve	1	I Started Out with Nothin and I Still Got Most of It Left	9	—
Leon Jackson	1	Right Now	4	—
Rhydian	1	Rhydian	3	—
The Priests	1	The Priests	5	—

Notes

Jonathan Ansell stepped away from his group G4 - who finished second on the second series of The X Factor and recorded two top 10 albums including a number-one - to record his debut top 10 solo album Tenor at the Movies. Sharleen Spiteri had a highly successful career to date as a member of the Scottish band Texas. Her debut album as a solo artist, Melody, reached number three.

Damon Albarn of Gorillaz and Blur recorded the soundtrack to the stage adaption of Chinese novel Journey to the West under the name Monkey. The album also featured the UK Chinese Ensemble making their album chart debut.

Queen + Paul Rodgers was a collaboration between Brian May and Roger Taylor from Queen, and Paul Rodgers, who had been part of numerous bands including Free and The Firm. The Cosmos Rocks was their first and only charting album as a supergroup.

=== Best-selling albums ===
Duffy had the best-selling album of the year with Rockferry. The album spent 42 weeks in the top 10 (including five weeks at number one), sold almost 1.685 million copies and was certified 6× platinum by the BPI. The Circus by Take That came in second place. Kings of Leon's Only by the Night, Spirit from Leona Lewis and Viva la Vida or Death and All His Friends by Coldplay made up the top five. Albums by Rihanna, The Killers, Girls Aloud, Pink and Scouting for Girls were also in the top ten best-selling albums of the year.

== Top-ten albums ==
Key

Symbol	Meaning
‡	Album peaked in 2006 or 2007 but still in chart in 2008.
♦	Album released in 2008 but peaked in 2009.
(#)	Year-end top-ten album position and rank
Entered	The date that the album first appeared in the chart.
Peak	Highest position that the album reached in the UK Albums Chart.

Entered (week ending)	Weeks in top 10	Album	Artist	Peak	Peak reached (week ending)	Weeks at peak
Albums in 2006
11 November 2006	54	Back to Black ‡	Amy Winehouse	1	20 January 2007	3
9 December 2006	28	Beautiful World ‡	Take That	1	9 December 2006	8
Albums in 2007
17 February 2007	32	Life in Cartoon Motion ‡	Mika	1	17 February 2007	2
21 April 2007	11	Timbaland Presents: Shock Value ‡	Timbaland	2	4 August 2007	1
28 April 2007	13	Version ‡	Mark Ronson	2	28 April 2007	2
12 May 2007	12	Call Me Irresponsible ‡	Michael Bublé	2	12 May 2007	1
16 June 2007	27	Good Girl Gone Bad ‡ (#6)	Rihanna	1	16 June 2007	1
11 August 2007	14	This Is the Life	Amy Macdonald	1	19 January 2008	1
11 August 2007	11	Hand Built by Robots ‡	Newton Faulkner	1	1 September 2007	2
29 September 2007	5	All the Lost Souls ‡	James Blunt	1	29 September 2007	1
3 November 2007	7	The Trick to Life ‡	The Hoosiers	1	3 November 2007	1
10 November 2007	7	Raising Sand	Robert Plant & Alison Krauss	2	2 February 2008	1
17 November 2007	8	Back Home ‡	Westlife	1	17 November 2007	1
24 November 2007	26	Spirit ‡ (#4)	Leona Lewis	1	24 November 2007	8
24 November 2007	7	Mothership ‡	Led Zeppelin	4	24 November 2007	2
24 November 2007	7	The Best of Andrea Bocelli: Vivere ‡	Andrea Bocelli	4	29 December 2007	1
8 December 2007	5	Breathless ‡	Shayne Ward	2	8 December 2007	1
29 December 2007	12	Back to Black: The Deluxe Edition	Amy Winehouse	1	8 March 2008	1
Albums in 2008
5 January 2008	2	Perfect Day	Cascada	9	12 January 2008	1
12 January 2008	3	In Rainbows	Radiohead	1	12 January 2008	1
19 January 2008	14	Scouting for Girls (#10)	Scouting for Girls	1	26 January 2008	2
26 January 2008	1	Do You Like Rock Music?	British Sea Power	10	26 January 2008	1
2 February 2008	1	Lupe Fiasco's The Cool	Lupe Fiasco	7	2 February 2008	1
2 February 2008	19	All the Right Reasons	Nickelback	2	23 February 2008	2
9 February 2008	7	19	Adele	1	9 February 2008	1
9 February 2008	1	Scream Aim Fire	Bullet for My Valentine	5	9 February 2008	1
9 February 2008	1	The Ultimate Hits	Garth Brooks	10	9 February 2008	1
16 February 2008	3	Sleep Through the Static	Jack Johnson	1	16 February 2008	2
16 February 2008	1	Made in the Dark	Hot Chip	4	16 February 2008	1
16 February 2008	1	Growing Pains	Mary J. Blige	6	16 February 2008	1
16 February 2008	2	His Wondrous Story – The Complete Collection	Billy Fury	10	16 February 2008	2
23 February 2008	7	Thriller 25	Michael Jackson	3	23 February 2008	1
23 February 2008	1	Greatest Hits	Morrissey	5	23 February 2008	1
23 February 2008	1	Started a Fire	One Night Only	10	23 February 2008	1
1 March 2008	1	Join With Us	The Feeling	1	1 March 2008	1
1 March 2008	1	Tenor at the Movies	Jonathan Ansell	9	1 March 2008	1
8 March 2008	3	Seventh Tree	Goldfrapp	2	8 March 2008	1
8 March 2008	1	From Donny... with Love	Donny Osmond	8	8 March 2008	1
15 March 2008	42	Rockferry (#1)	Duffy	1	15 March 2008	5
15 March 2008	1	Dig, Lazarus, Dig!!!	Nick Cave & the Bad Seeds	4	15 March 2008	1
22 March 2008	6	Dreaming Out Loud	OneRepublic	2	22 March 2008	1
22 March 2008	1	Classic Soul Hits	The Temptations	8	22 March 2008	1
29 March 2008	2	Haarp	Muse	2	29 March 2008	1
29 March 2008	8	The Seldom Seen Kid	Elbow	5	29 March 2008	2
29 March 2008	1	11	Bryan Adams	6	29 March 2008	1
29 March 2008	1	Music of the Spheres	Mike Oldfield	9	29 March 2008	1
29 March 2008	1	Keep It Simple	Van Morrison	10	29 March 2008	1
5 April 2008	1	Pretty. Odd.	Panic! at the Disco	2	5 April 2008	1
5 April 2008	1	Antidotes	Foals	3	5 April 2008	1
5 April 2008	2	Consolers of the Lonely	The Raconteurs	8	5 April 2008	1
5 April 2008	1	Red	Guillemots	9	5 April 2008	1
12 April 2008	3	Accelerate	R.E.M.	1	12 April 2008	1
12 April 2008	1	Shine	Estelle	6	12 April 2008	1
19 April 2008	1	Shine a Light	The Rolling Stones	2	19 April 2008	1
19 April 2008	2	St. Jude	The Courteeners	4	19 April 2008	1
19 April 2008	1	Hey Ma	James	10	19 April 2008	1
26 April 2008	4	Konk	The Kooks	1	26 April 2008	1
26 April 2008	2	E=MC²	Mariah Carey	3	26 April 2008	1
26 April 2008	1	Elliot Minor	Elliot Minor	6	26 April 2008	1
3 May 2008	3	The Age of the Understatement	The Last Shadow Puppets	1	3 May 2008	1
3 May 2008	1	Good to Be Bad	Whitesnake	7	3 May 2008	1
10 May 2008	5	Hard Candy	Madonna	1	10 May 2008	1
10 May 2008	2	Third	Portishead	2	10 May 2008	1
10 May 2008	2	Sam Sparro	Sam Sparro	4	17 May 2008	1
10 May 2008	3	The Very Best of The Platters	The Platters	8	17 May 2008	1
10 May 2008	2	Lessons to Be Learned	Gabriella Cilmi	8	24 May 2008	1
17 May 2008	7	Jumping All Over the World	Scooter	1	17 May 2008	1
17 May 2008	1	Songs from the Sparkle Lounge	Def Leppard	10	17 May 2008	1
24 May 2008	8	Home Before Dark	Neil Diamond	1	24 May 2008	1
24 May 2008	3	In Silico	Pendulum	2	24 May 2008	1
24 May 2008	1	My Own Way	Jay Sean	6	24 May 2008	1
24 May 2008	1	Nothing but the Best	Frank Sinatra	10	24 May 2008	1
31 May 2008	14	We Started Nothing	The Ting Tings	1	31 May 2008	1
31 May 2008	2	Little Dreamer	Beth Rowley	6	31 May 2008	1
31 May 2008	5	The Best of Neil Diamond	Neil Diamond	7	31 May 2008	2
31 May 2008	3	Chant – Music for Paradise	Cistercian Monks of Stift Heiligenkreu	7	7 June 2008	1
7 June 2008	3	Here I Stand	Usher	1	7 June 2008	1
7 June 2008	1	Emergency	The Pigeon Detectives	5	7 June 2008	1
14 June 2008	4	22 Dreams	Paul Weller	1	14 June 2008	1
14 June 2008	3	Radiohead: The Best Of	Radiohead	4	14 June 2008	1
14 June 2008	1	You Can Do Anything	The Zutons	6	14 June 2008	1
14 June 2008	1	This Is Alphabeat	Alphabeat	10	14 June 2008	1
21 June 2008	14	Viva la Vida or Death and All His Friends (#5)	Coldplay	1	21 June 2008	6
21 June 2008	3	Here We Stand	The Fratellis	5	21 June 2008	1
28 June 2008	4	Skydivin'	Darren Styles	4	28 June 2008	2
28 June 2008	1	Silent Cry	Feeder	8	28 June 2008	1
28 June 2008	1	Little Voice	Sara Bareilles	9	28 June 2008	1
5 July 2008	1	Með suð í eyrum við spilum endalaust	Sigur Rós	5	5 July 2008	1
5 July 2008	6	Exclusive	Chris Brown	3	12 July 2008	2
5 July 2008	1	Jonas Brothers	Jonas Brothers	9	5 July 2008	1
12 July 2008	1	Poor Man's Heaven	Seth Lakeman	8	12 July 2008	1
19 July 2008	1	Partie Traumatic	Black Kids	5	19 July 2008	1
19 July 2008	1	Modern Guilt	Beck	9	19 July 2008	1
26 July 2008	4	Now You're Gone – The Album	Basshunter	1	26 July 2008	1
26 July 2008	5	Melody	Sharleen Spiteri	3	26 July 2008	1
26 July 2008	9	ABBA Gold: Greatest Hits	ABBA	1	9 August 2008	2
26 July 2008	1	Piano Man: The Very Best of Billy Joel	Billy Joel	9	26 July 2008	1
2 August 2008	3	I Believe – The Very Best of The Bachelors	The Bachelors	7	2 August 2008	1
2 August 2008	1	Beautiful Future	Primal Scream	9	2 August 2008	1
9 August 2008	4	Rock n Roll Jesus	Kid Rock	4	9 August 2008	2
23 August 2008	12	The Script	The Script	1	23 August 2008	3
23 August 2008	2	Peaceful, the World Lays Me Down	Noah and the Whale	5	23 August 2008	1
23 August 2008	2	Jane	Jane McDonald	7	23 August 2008	1
30 August 2008	1	Journey to the West	Monkey	5	30 August 2008	1
6 September 2008	4	Forth	The Verve	1	6 September 2008	2
6 September 2008	2	All Hope Is Gone	Slipknot	2	6 September 2008	1
6 September 2008	2	Somewhere	Eva Cassidy	4	6 September 2008	1
6 September 2008	4	King of Pop	Michael Jackson	3	13 September 2008	1
6 September 2008	1	LAX	The Game	9	6 September 2008	1
6 September 2008	1	A Piece of What You Need	Teddy Thompson	10	6 September 2008	1
13 September 2008	1	Breakout	Miley Cyrus	10	13 September 2008	1
20 September 2008	3	Death Magnetic	Metallica	1	20 September 2008	2
20 September 2008	2	Glasvegas	Glasvegas	2	20 September 2008	1
27 September 2008	5	Year of the Gentleman	Ne-Yo	2	27 September 2008	1
27 September 2008	1	The Cosmos Rocks	Queen + Paul Rodgers	5	27 September 2008	1
27 September 2008	1	Everything Is Borrowed	The Streets	7	27 September 2008	1
4 October 2008	40	Only By the Night (#3)	Kings of Leon	1	4 October 2008	4
4 October 2008	2	Doll Domination	The Pussycat Dolls	4	4 October 2008	1
4 October 2008	6	The Best Bette	Bette Midler	6	4 October 2008	2
4 October 2008	1	Radio Active	McFly	8	4 October 2008	4
4 October 2008	1	Live in Gdańsk	David Gilmour	10	4 October 2008	1
11 October 2008	3	Let It Go	Will Young	2	11 October 2008	1
11 October 2008	13	Songs for You, Truths for Me	James Morrison	3	11 October 2008	1
11 October 2008	2	One Voice	Andrew Johnston	4	11 October 2008	1
11 October 2008	2	I Started Out with Nothin and I Still Got Most of It Left	Seasick Steve	9	11 October 2008	2
18 October 2008	4	Dig Out Your Soul	Oasis	1	18 October 2008	1
18 October 2008	1	The Bootleg Series Vol. 8: Tell Tale Signs	Bob Dylan	9	18 October 2008	1
25 October 2008	2	Perfect Symmetry	Keane	1	25 October 2008	1
25 October 2008	2	Back Again... No Matter What	Boyzone	4	25 October 2008	1
1 November 2008	3	Black Ice	AC/DC	1	1 November 2008	1
1 November 2008	1	Off with Their Heads	Kaiser Chiefs	2	1 November 2008	1
1 November 2008	1	Right Now	Leon Jackson	4	1 November 2008	1
1 November 2008	2	Sacred Arias	Katherine Jenkins	5	1 November 2008	1
1 November 2008	1	Catfights and Spotlights	Sugababes	8	1 November 2008	1
1 November 2008	3	The Best Of	Sash!	8	8 November 2008	1
8 November 2008	14	Funhouse (#9)	Pink	1	8 November 2008	1
8 November 2008	3	A Hundred Million Suns	Snow Patrol	2	8 November 2008	1
8 November 2008	3	My Love: Essential Collection	Celine Dion	5	8 November 2008	1
8 November 2008	1	Country Boy	Daniel O'Donnell	6	8 November 2008	1
8 November 2008	1	Intimacy	Bloc Party	8	8 November 2008	1
15 November 2008	9	Out of Control (#8)	Girls Aloud	1	15 November 2008	1
15 November 2008	2	Greatest Hits	Enrique Iglesias	3	15 November 2008	1
15 November 2008	1	Slipway Fires	Razorlight	4	15 November 2008	1
15 November 2008	1	Pictures – 40 Years of Hits	Status Quo	8	15 November 2008	1
22 November 2008	6	The Promise	Il Divo	1	22 November 2008	1
22 November 2008	8	Decade in the Sun: Best of Stereophonics	Stereophonics	2	22 November 2008	1
22 November 2008	1	And Winter Came...	Enya	6	22 November 2008	1
22 November 2008	1	Keeps Gettin' Better: A Decade of Hits	Christina Aguilera	10	22 November 2008	1
29 November 2008	1	Safe Trip Home	Dido	2	29 November 2008	1
29 November 2008	1	Dark Horse	Nickelback	4	29 November 2008	1
29 November 2008	1	Simply Red 25: The Greatest Hits	Simply Red	9	29 November 2008	1
29 November 2008	22	I Am... Sasha Fierce ♦	Beyoncé	2	22 August 2009	1
6 December 2008	13	Day & Age (#6)	The Killers	1	6 December 2008	1
6 December 2008	1	Chinese Democracy	Guns N' Roses	2	6 December 2008	1
6 December 2008	3	Rhydian	Rhydian	3	6 December 2008	1
6 December 2008	4	The Priests	The Priests	5	6 December 2008	1
13 December 2008	12	The Circus (#2)	Take That	1	13 December 2008	5
13 December 2008	1	Circus	Britney Spears	4	13 December 2008	1

== Entries by artist ==
The following table shows artists who achieved two or more top 10 entries in 2008, including albums that reached their peak in 2007 or 2009. The figures only include main artists, with featured artists and appearances on compilation albums not counted individually for each artist. The total number of weeks an artist spent in the top ten in 2008 is also shown.

Entries	Artist	Weeks	Albums
2	Amy Winehouse	14	Back to Black, Back to Black: The Deluxe Edition
2	Michael Jackson	9	King of Pop, Thriller 25
2	Neil Diamond	13	Home Before Dark, The Best of Neil Diamond
2	Nickelback	20	All the Right Reasons, Dark Horse
2	Radiohead	6	In Rainbows, Radiohead: The Best Of
2	Take That	8	Beautiful World, The Circus

== Notes ==
- Life in Cartoon Motion re-entered the top 10 at number 9 on 5 January 2008 (week ending) for 5 weeks and at number 9 on 23 February 2008 (week ending) for 4 weeks.
- Shock Value re-entered the top 10 at number 10 on 12 January 2008 (week ending).
- Version re-entered the top 10 at number 4 on 1 March 2008 (week ending) for 4 weeks.
- Call Me Irresponsible has two separate entries in the UK Albums Chart, one as a standard edition, and one as a special edition. Combining both editions, the album spent 12 non-consecutive weeks in the UK top 10 altogether. The special edition entered the top 10 at number 3 on 22 December 2007 (week ending), re-entered at number 6 on 23 February 2008 (week ending) and re-entered at number 4 on 8 March 2008 (week ending).
- Good Girl Gone Bad re-entered the top 10 at number 9 on 26 January 2008 (week ending) for 4 weeks, at number 10 on 1 March 2008 (week ending), at number 10 on 28 June 2008 (week ending), at number 9 on 12 July 2008 (week ending) for 2 weeks, at number 9 on 16 August 2008 (week ending) for 3 weeks and at number 5 on 13 September 2008 (week ending) for 7 weeks.
- This Is the Life re-entered the top 10 at number 6 on 12 January 2008 (week ending) for 7 weeks and at number 10 on 15 March 2008 (week ending) for 2 weeks.
- Hand Built by Robots re-entered the top 10 at number 7 on 19 January 2008 (week ending) for 4 weeks.
- All the Lost Souls re-entered the top 10 at number 8 on 12 April 2008 (week ending).
- The Trick to Life re-entered the top 10 at number 8 on 12 January 2008 (week ending) and at number 8 on 26 January 2008 (week ending) for 3 weeks.
- Raising Sand re-entered the top 10 at number 6 on 19 January 2008 (week ending) for 5 weeks.
- Spirit re-entered the top 10 at number 4 on 22 March 2008 (week ending) for 8 weeks and at number-one on 29 November 2008 (week ending) for 9 weeks.
- Call Me Irresponsible: Special Edition re-entered the top 10 at number 6 on 23 February 2008 (week ending) and at number 4 on 8 March 2008 (week ending).
- Scouting for Girls re-entered the top 10 at number 8 on 19 April 2008 (week ending) for 7 weeks and at number 10 on 30 August 2008 (week ending).
- All the Right Reasons re-entered the top 10 at number 8 on 19 July 2008 (week ending) for 5 weeks.
- 19 re-entered the top 10 at number 8 on 3 May 2008 (week ending).
- His Wondrous Story – The Complete Collection re-entered the top 10 at number 10 on 8 March 2008 (week ending).
- Thriller 25 re-entered the top 10 at number 9 on 22 April 2008 (week ending) and at number 9 on 18 July 2009 (week ending).
- Back to Black: Deluxe Edition re-entered the top 10 at number 3 on 1 March 2008 (week ending) for 8 weeks, at number 10 on 8 May 2008 (week ending) and at number 7 on 12 July 2008 (week ending) for 2 weeks.
- Rockferry re-entered the top 10 at number 10 on 27 December 2008 (week ending) for 6 weeks and at number 4 on 28 February 2009 (week ending) for 3 weeks.
- The Seldom Seen Kid re-entered the top 10 at number 7 on 20 September 2008 (week ending) for 3 weeks, at number 6 on 14 February 2009 (week ending) and at number 5 on 28 February 2009 (week ending) for 3 weeks.
- Hard Candy re-entered the top 10 at number 10 on 26 July 2008 (week ending).
- Lessons to Be Learned re-entered the top 10 at number 8 on 24 May 2008 (week ending).
- Jumping All Over the World re-entered the top 10 at number 8 on 5 July 2008 (week ending).
- We Started Nothing re-entered the top 10 at number 6 on 12 July 2008 (week ending) for 7 weeks, at number 9 on 17 January 2009 (week ending) and at number 8 on 28 February 2009 (week ending) for 3 weeks.
- The Best of Neil Diamond originally peaked outside the top 10 at number 68 upon its initial release in 1996. It charted again at a new peak of number 30 in 2006 before reaching the top ten in 2008.
- The Best of Neil Diamond re-entered the top 10 at number 10 on 12 July 2008 (week ending).
- Chant – Music for Paradise re-entered the top 10 at number 10 on 21 June 2008 (week ending).
- Gold: Greatest Hits originally peaked at number-one upon its initial release in 1992. It returned to the chart on many further occasions, including five more weeks at the top spot in 1999.
- Piano Man: The Very Best of Billy Joel originally peaked outside the top 10 at number 40 upon its initial release in 2004. It reached a new peak of number 11 in 2006.
- The Script re-entered the top 10 at number 8 on 10 January 2009 (week ending) for 6 weeks.
- Journey to the West was the soundtrack to the stage musical Monkey: Journey to the West. It was credited to Monkey and performed by Damon Albarn and the UK Chinese Ensemble.
- King of Pop re-entered the top 10 at number 5 on 11 July 2009 (week ending) after the death of Michael Jackson.
- Only By the Night re-entered the top 10 at number 6 on 27 June 2009 (week ending) for 2 weeks and at number 4 on 12 September 2009 (week ending) for 4 weeks.
- The Best Bette re-entered the top 10 at number 6 on 21 February 2009 (week ending) and at number 9 on 28 March 2009 (week ending).
- Songs for You, Truths for Me re-entered the top 10 at number 7 on 17 January 2009 (week ending) for 6 weeks, at number 9 on 11 April 2009 (week ending), at number 9 on 25 April 2009 (week ending) and at number 9 on 5 September 2009 (week ending) for 2 weeks.
- I Started Out with Nothin and I Still Got Most of It Left re-entered the top 10 at number 9 on 28 February 2009 (week ending).
- Funhouse re-entered the top 10 at number 10 on 3 January 2009 (week ending) and at number 10 on 2 May 2009 (week ending) for 6 weeks.
- The Promise re-entered the top 10 at number 5 on 20 December 2008 (week ending) for 3 weeks.
- I Am... Sasha Fierce re-entered the top 10 at number 9 on 27 December 2008 (week ending) for 8 weeks, at number 10 on 11 April 2009 (week ending) for 9 weeks and at number 5 on 15 August 2009 (week ending) for 4 weeks.
- Day & Age re-entered the top 10 at number 10 on 7 February 2009 (week ending) for 5 weeks.
- The Circus re-entered the top 10 at number 8 on 7 March 2009 (week ending) for 4 weeks and at number 4 on 4 July 2009 (week ending).
- Figure includes album that peaked in 2006.
- Figure includes album that peaked in 2007.
- Figure includes album that first charted in 2006 but peaked in 2007.
- Figure includes album that first charted in 2007 but peaked in 2008.

== See also ==
- 2008 in British music
- List of number-one albums from the 2000s (UK)
