= Monkey Magic =

Monkey Magic may refer to:

- Monkey (TV series), often referred to as Monkey Magic due to the title music lyrics, a Japanese television series that ran from 1978 to 1980
  - "Monkey Magic" (song), the show's theme song
  - Monkey Magic (C64 game), a 1984 Commodore 64 game based on the television series
- Monkey Magic (video game), a 1979 arcade game released by Nintendo
- Monkey Magic (Japanese TV series), an animated series that ran from 1998 to 1999
  - Monkey Magic (1999 video game), a PlayStation game based on the animated series
- Monkey Magic (British TV series), a magic TV series that ran from 2003 to 2004
- Monkey Magic, a manga by Hakase Mizuki
- Monkey Magic: The Movie, a film version of the 2006 Saiyūki TV series

== See also ==
- Monkey Majik, a Japanese rock band
- Journey to the West (disambiguation)
