= The Monkey King's Daughter =

The Monkey King's Daughter is a series of books by author Todd DeBonis for young readers, aged 8 to 12, about the adventures of Meilin Cheng, a 14-year-old Asian-American high school girl who learns she is the daughter of the mythical Sun Wukong — the Monkey King. It is illustrated by John Forcucci. Paul T. Vogel wrote for Midwest Book Review that "'The Monkey King's Daughter' is quite the entertaining read, highly recommended."

The book series was optioned as a major Chinese-American co-production Feature Film with an expected worldwide release scheduled for 2016. The announcement was made at the 2015 Cannes Film Festival by Mustardseed Media Group and Red Sea Media, in partnership with Beijing Chunqiu Time Culture Company.

As of January 2013, there are 4 novels in the ongoing series:

- Book 1, Meilin. 2009. ISBN 978-0-9678094-4-1
- Book 2, Red Boy. 2009. ISBN 978-0-9678094-2-7
- Book 3, The Spider Demon. 2010. ISBN 978-0-9678094-5-8
- Book 4, The Jade Rabbit. 2011. ISBN 978-0-9678094-6-5

== See also ==
- Journey to the West
- List of Journey to the West characters
- List of media adaptations of Journey to the West
