= Van Hoang =

Vietnamese-born American writer (born June 2026)

Van Hoang (born 20th century) is a Vietnamese-born American children's writer, known for her debut fantasy novel Girl Giant and the Monkey King (2020). The sequel, Girl Giant and the Jade War, was published in December 2021.

== Background ==
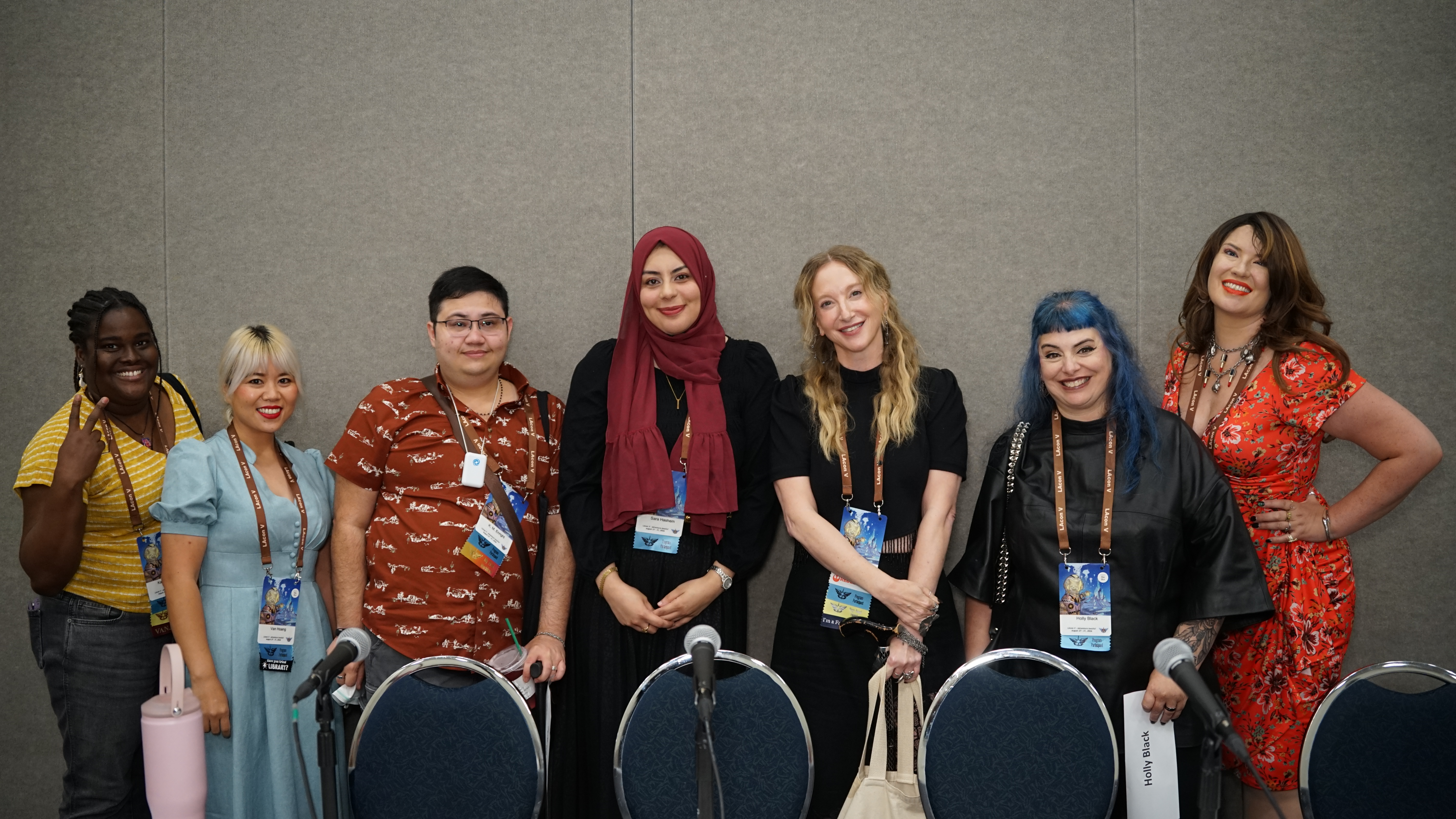
Hoang, K. M. Enright, Sara Hashem, Leigh Bardugo, Holly Black, Sarah Rees Brennan at Worldcon 2026

Hoang has Vietnamese heritage and moved to the United States when she was four years old.

== Career ==
She began writing professionally while working as a librarian at thd Huntington Beach Library in Southern California.
