= Journey to the West (soundtrack) =

Soundtrack album by Monkey
- Released: 18 August 2008
- Genres: Art pop; experimental; electronic; rock opera
- Length: 49:49
- Label: XL
- Producer: Damon Albarn

Damon Albarn chronology
D-Sides (2007)	Journey to the West (2008)	Midlife: A Beginner's Guide to Blur (2009)

Journey to the West is the soundtrack to the stage musical Monkey: Journey to the West and is composed by English musician Damon Albarn (of Blur and Gorillaz fame) with the UK Chinese Ensemble. The soundtrack is based upon the musical, but is not a direct recording of it. The album was released as a download, CD, and double vinyl LP in the United Kingdom on 18 August 2008 by XL Recordings. In the United States, the album was released a day later as a download, while a CD was released on 23 September 2008.

== Background ==
Damon Albarn made a point in an interview with Gorillaz-Unofficial that the Monkey project was supposed to be "Gorillaz, really. But we can't call it that for legal reasons". Speaking of his decision to compose music for an opera, Albarn noted that, "This is composition, not songwriting, of course, I was apprehensive at first. But people who come from my normal discipline don't tend to go far enough. We want to bring more flavour to people's lives. And demystify opera to a degree, destroy its elitist angle. Then for people who do like opera, open them up to new forms of music, too. We want to bring a big cornerstone of Chinese culture and present it to the West. If we can do that, then we've succeeded."

Chen Shi-Zheng, the man responsible for creating and conceiving the stage adaptation of Monkey: Journey to the West, explained that he "was looking for someone young and smart to work with. I didn't want to give Damon or Jamie too specific a brief because what was important in this project was that it was their sensibility we wanted. What Damon and I did agree on straightaway was that we didn't want pastiche Chinese music and on the last trip we made he found something he could latch on to."

Chen took Albarn and Hewlett to China up to five times, Hewlett claimed that "we spent three years working on the opera, we totally immersed ourselves in Chinese culture." 18 months after starting work on the project, Albarn produced his first piece called "Heavenly Peach Banquet" which was a take on the style of music performed by female C-pop acts. Talking about the piece, Chen said that "I find it very humorous, Hong Kong pop is so pretty and naïve. This is Damon pretending to be naïve and you are laughing at him. Messy is a bad word, but he took a melody, messed it around and put noises into it, twisted and processed the sound so that none of it is as it seems."

In order to compose the music, Albarn made a habit of strictly using the Chinese pentatonic scale with the aid of a system he used consisting of five- and seven-pointed stars which he stuck to his soundboard and that he would rotate (supposedly at random) to produce unexpected combinations of notes. The decision to use this method came about after Albarn had been analysing the five-point communist star.

Talking about the sound that he was aiming for, Albarn stated that, "it's very much a modern piece, it's not trying to evoke the time of legend at all. It's very much in sort of downtown Beijing, Shanghai or Tokyo. It's very much the modern Asia: slightly kooky, very colourful, quite sexy, but still a quite sinister place."

Albarn's orchestra included Chinese instruments such as the pipa (sometimes called the Chinese lute) and the Ondes Martenot, which is an early electronic musical instrument invented in 1928. In addition to the large variety of Chinese instruments used, the opera features the "klaxophone", which features car-horns attached to a musical keyboard, and was built for the production by Gavin Turk with the intention to reproduce the sounds of China's roads.

Backing up his decision to release the production's musical score, Albarn explained that "I wanted to put the album out so that there is a record, literally, of how I think of it in my head, but the music should stand alone because none of it was composed as an accompaniment to action. I wasn't going to start making music that drives the narrative, because that's just naff; it becomes like film music or cartoon music. 'Now they're running.' You can't really work like that. I just wrote an awful lot of music and slowly kind of put it together."

The album features a track which shares its name with the national anthem of the People's Republic of China, March of the Volunteers, the piece is in fact an alternative, upbeat version of the anthem. The Japanese edition of the album features two bonus tracks, one of which is titled "Journey to Beijing" which was used by the BBC alongside Hewlett's animation as a promotional link for its Olympics coverage.

Two special editions box sets of the album were released. The "Deluxe" box set contains a 68-page booklet as well as a poster. It was originally limited to 2500 copies but has been repressed since then. The "Art" box set contains six exclusive tracks ("5 Point Star", "Living Sea Introduction", "The Dragon Queen", "Buddha's Palm", "Monk's Funeral" and "Volcano"). It was priced at £255 and was limited to 2000 copies. It also features an 80-page hardback book and four art prints (one of which was signed by Jamie Hewlett). Additionally the first 500 orders also received a special Monkey Om Box which plays pieces of music composed by Damon Albarn.

=== Promotion ===
Two tracks were performed live on 7 October 2008 on Later...With Jools Holland.

== Reception ==
=== Commercial performance ===
Journey to the West entered the UK Albums Chart at #5 on release, entirely in Mandarin, it became the first album of its kind to chart in the United Kingdom. It also reached #1 on the UK Indie Chart. Overall the album spent four weeks in the UK's Top 100 Albums, two of which were in the Top 40. The track "Monkey Bee" managed to enter the Top 200 of the UK Singles Chart – on downloads alone – at #196.

=== Critical response ===
Professional ratings
Aggregate scores
Source	Rating
Metacritic	69/100
Review scores
Source	Rating
AllMusic	3.5/5 stars
ChartAttack	3.5/5 stars
The Guardian	4/5 stars
Pitchfork Media	7.8/10
MusicOMH	2/5 stars
NME	7/10 stars
IGN	9.5/10 stars
Q	3/5 stars
The Skinny	4/5 stars
The Times	5/5 stars

The album met with generally positive reviews, based on an aggregate score of 69/100 from Metacritic, who listed 0 out of the 13 available reviews as "negative". IGN gave the album an overall score of 9.5 (out of 10) and states "mixing Asian melodies with western electronic sounds is certainly nothing new, but the Monkey project is a broad collaboration with some of the most talented performers in Chinese opera, and the resulting mélange is appreciably more authentic than your average world beat record" and adds "the score ranks as the best rock opera ever written and deserves a place among the most audacious modern operas, regardless of genre. This is a brilliant and challenging composition that deserves to be celebrated." The Times writer Robert Sandall awarded the album 5 stars out of 5, claiming that, "Albarn has really gone the distance in trying to master the indigenous pentatonic scale without abandoning the playful spirit he brought to Gorillaz." while viewing the album as sitting "roughly equidistant between East/West fusion pop and a contemporary classical work such as Adams's Nixon in China." URB echoed these thoughts, stating that "Monkey: Journey to the West is a testament to Albarn's versatility as a musician and his melodies' ability to avoid becoming losing their power in translation." The Guardian gave the album four stars and insisted that "You can go a fair distance without encountering a tune, which is less of a problem when there is something to look at. But even during the occasional longueurs, it's hard not to marvel at the ambition on display here, hard to think of anyone who would dare attempt something similar, and impossible to imagine someone else pulling it off with more aplomb."

However, Keith McDonnell of MusicOMH, gave a rather mixed review of the record itself, rewarding it 2 stars out of 5 and viewing the release as "disappointing on every conceivable level" and states the album pales in comparison to the stage musical itself "I'd totally succumbed to its charm in the theatre, but I'd advise anyone approaching this CD to do so with caution, especially if you've not seen it in its glory in the theatre where it belongs." Online music and film webzine Tiny Mix Tapes questioned the album's appeal, commenting that, "Albarn's thirst for musical adventure is commendable, but unless you're obsessed with his every move or have been dreaming of the day a former Brit pop king fuses the sensibilities of Eastern opera and Western pop, Monkey just doesn't warrant your full attention." PopMatters writer Marc A. Price was slightly more positive, rewarding a 5/10 rating, while writing that "Other pop fans are more likely to see through the emperor's new clothes and call this for what it is: mostly weak but with a couple of monkey magic moments."

Despite Albarn's intentions for the album's music to "stand alone", Pitchfork Media pointed out that, "The project still has the feel of an accompanying piece, with titles referencing the dramatization of the Chinese story and plenty of incidental music," although it was also noted that the album "works on a satisfying level as an experimental work or as art-pop."

Stephen Thomas Erlewine of AllMusic gave it 3½ out of 5 stars and wrote that, "Journey to the West is perhaps best experienced on-stage, as it was meant to be heard in tandem with Chen Shi-Zheng and Hewlett's visuals, but heard as its own work, it's hard not to admire, if not exactly embrace, Albarn's achievement here, as his work is not only ambitious, it is serious and understated, the work of a true composer."

== Track listing ==
No.	Title	Length
1.	"Monkey's World"	2:34
2.	"Monkey Travels"	0:45
3.	"Into the Eastern Sea"	0:35
4.	"The Living Sea"	1:54
5.	"The Dragon King"	2:19
6.	"Iron Rod"	1:06
7.	"Out of the Eastern Sea"	1:05
8.	"Heavenly Peach Banquet"	3:32
9.	"Battle in Heaven"	3:30
10.	"O Mi To Fu"	0:57
11.	"Whisper"	2:17
12.	"Tripitaka's Curse"	1:22
13.	"Confessions of a Pig"	3:21
14.	"Sandy the River Demon"	2:16
15.	"March of the Volunteers"	1:52
16.	"The White Skeleton Demon"	1:34
17.	"Monk's Song"	1:46
18.	"I Love Buddha"	2:43
19.	"March of the Iron Army"	2:45
20.	"Pigsy in Space"	2:16
21.	"Monkey Bee"	5:01
22.	"Disappearing Volcano"	6:09
Total length:		49:49

== Release history ==
Country	Date	Label	Format	Catalogue number
United Kingdom	18 August 2008	XL Recordings	Download	XLDL 388
United Kingdom	18 August 2008	XL Recordings	CD	XLCD 388
United Kingdom	25 August 2008	The Vinyl Factory	LP box set	VF001
United States	19 August 2008	XL Recordings	Download	
United States	23 September 2008	XL Recordings	CD	XL-388-2

== Chart performance ==
Chart (2008)	Peak position
France (SNEP)	69
UK Albums (The Official Charts Company)	5
