= List of UK top-ten albums in 2009 =

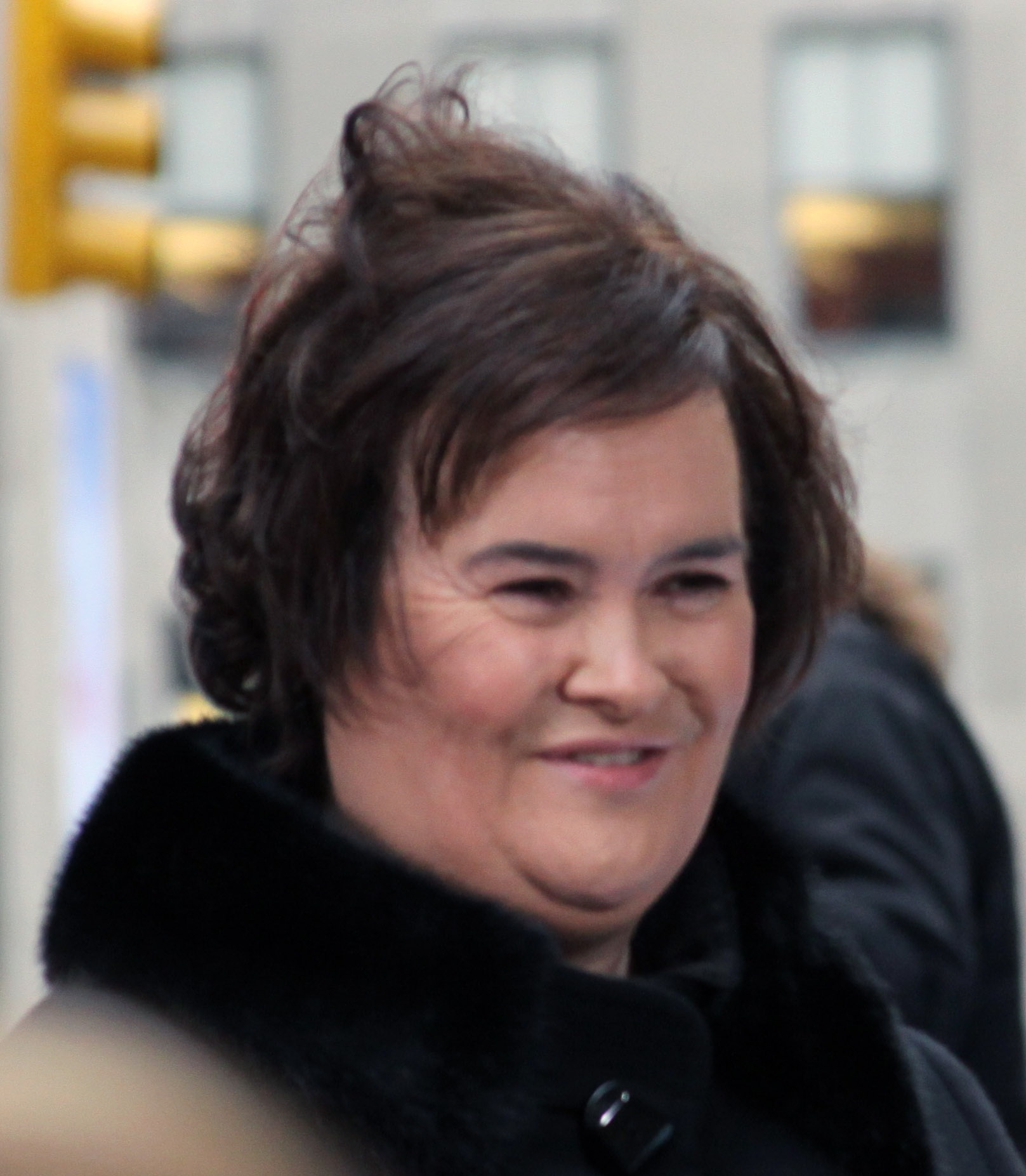
Scottish singer Susan Boyle, who rose to fame on the third series of Britain's Got Talent, had the UK's best selling album of 2009 with her debut record I Dreamed A Dream, which entered the chart at number-one in November and lasted four weeks at the summit. The album has sold almost sold almost 1.633 million copies in the UK alone.

The UK Albums Chart is one of many music charts compiled by the Official Charts Company that calculates the best-selling albums of the week in the United Kingdom. Since 2004 the chart has been based on the sales of both physical albums and digital downloads. This list shows albums that peaked in the Top 10 of the UK Albums Chart during 2009, as well as albums which peaked in 2008 and 2010 but were in the top 10 in 2009. The entry date is when the album appeared in the top 10 for the first time (week ending, as published by the Official Charts Company, which is six days after the chart is announced).

One-hundred and forty-seven albums were in the top ten this year. One album from 2007 and seventeen albums from 2008 remained in the top 10 for several weeks at the beginning of the year, while Crazy Love by Michael Bublé, Lungs by Florence + the Machine, Only Revolutions by Biffy Clyro and The Hits by Will Young were all released in 2009 but did not reach their peak until 2010. I Am... Sasha Fierce by Beyoncé was the only album from 2008 to reach its peak in 2009. Thirteen artists scored multiple entries in the top 10 in 2009. Florence + the Machine, Flo Rida, Lady Gaga, Taylor Swift and Tinchy Stryder were among the many artists who achieved their first UK charting top 10 album in 2009.

The 2008 Christmas number-one album, The Circus by Take That, remained at the top spot for the first two weeks of 2009. Only by the Night by Kings of Leon and the self titled album by The Script both returned for single weeks at number-one after first topping the chart in September and August 2008 respectively. The first new number-one album of the year was To Lose My Life... by White Lies. Overall, twenty-nine different albums peaked at number-one in 2009, with twenty-nine unique artists hitting that position.

== Background ==
=== Vera Lynn becomes oldest living artist to achieve UK number-one album ===
On 13 September 2009 (19 September 2009, week ending), Vera Lynn, known as "The Forces Sweetheart", made chart history when, at 92 years and 6 months old, she became the oldest living artist to achieve a UK number-one album when her compilation We'll Meet Again: The Very Best of Vera Lynn, topped the UK Albums Chart, having entered the top 10 at number two the previous week. The album is a selection of her recordings made for Decca Records, for whom Lynn recorded between 1936 and 1959.

=== Multiple entries ===
One-hundred and forty-seven albums charted in the top 10 in 2009, with one-hundred and twenty-six albums reaching their peak this year (including Abbey Road, Bad, Hits Out of Hell, Number Ones, Off the Wall, Revolver, Rubber Soul, Sgt. Pepper's Lonely Hearts Club Band, The Essential Michael Jackson, The Sound of Girls Aloud: The Greatest Hits, The Stone Roses, The Very Best of Fleetwood Mac and Thriller, which charted in previous years but reached a peak on their latest chart run).

Thirteen artists scored multiple entries in the top 10 in 2009. Michael Jackson had nine albums reaching the top ten. George Harrison had five entries, four of which were with The Beatles. Cheryl had one solo album and two with her group Girls Aloud. Bruce Springsteen, Ian Brown, Katherine Jenkins, Leona Lewis, Pink, The Saturdays, Seasick Steve and Take That were the other acts who had two top 10 albums this year. Katherine Jenkins and The Saturdays' two entries were both released this year.

=== Chart debuts ===
Twenty-six artists achieved their first top 10 album in 2009 as a lead artist.

The following table (collapsed on desktop site) does not include acts who had previously charted as part of a group and secured their first top 10 solo album, or featured appearances on compilations or other artists recordings.

Artist	Number of top 10s	First entry	Chart position	Other entries
MGMT	1	Oracular Spectacular	8	—
Lady Gaga	1	The Fame	1	—
White Lies	1	To Lose My Life...	1	—
Jason Mraz	1	We Sing. We Dance. We Steal Things.	8	—
The Saturdays	2	Chasing Lights	9	Wordshaker (9)
Fleet Foxes	1	Fleet Foxes	3	—
Taylor Swift	1	Fearless	5	—
Faryl Smith	1	Faryl	4	—
Flo Rida	1	R.O.O.T.S.	5	—
Bat for Lashes	1	Two Suns	5	—
The Noisettes	1	Wild Young Hearts	7	—
Ciara	1	Fantasy Ride	9	—
Escala	1	Escala	2	—
Daniel Merriweather	1	Love & War	2	—
Little Boots	1	Hands	5	—
La Roux	1	La Roux	2	—
Florence + the Machine	1	Lungs	1	—
Tinchy Stryder	1	Catch 22	2	—
Pixie Lott	1	Turn It Up	6	—
Paramore	1	Brand New Eyes	1	—
Chipmunk	1	I Am Chipmunk	2	—
Alexandra Burke	1	Overcome	1	—
Paloma Faith	1	Do You Want the Truth or Something Beautiful?	9	—
The Soldiers	1	Coming Home	4	—
JLS	1	JLS	1	—
N-Dubz	1	Against All Odds	6	—
Susan Boyle	1	I Dreamed a Dream	1	—

Notes

Girl group The Saturdays included among its members Rochelle Humes and Frankie Sandford, who had previously been a part of S Club Juniors (later S Club 8). Their debut album Together reached number five in 2002. Yusuf was formerly known as Yusuf Islam and Cat Stevens - Roadsinger was his first charting album under this shortened name.

E Street Band had their first top 10 album officially credited by the Official Charts Company this year, although they had featured on much of Bruce Springsteen's back-catalogue. Cheryl launched a solo career in 2009 with her debut 3 Words. She was still an active part of the group Girls Aloud, who had reached the album chart top 10 on five occasions by this point.

=== Best-selling albums ===
Susan Boyle had the best-selling album of the year with I Dreamed a Dream. The album spent seven weeks in the top 10 (including four weeks at number one), sold almost 1.633 million copies and was certified 7× platinum by the BPI. The Fame by Lady Gaga came in second place. Michael Bublé's Crazy Love, The E.N.D. from The Black Eyed Peas and Only by the Night by Kings of Leon made up the top five. Albums by JLS, Beyoncé, Paolo Nutini, Lily Allen and Robbie Williams were also in the top ten best-selling albums of the year.

== Top-ten albums ==
Key

Symbol	Meaning
‡	Album peaked in 2007 or 2008 but still in chart in 2009.
♦	Album released in 2009 but peaked in 2010.
(#)	Year-end top-ten album position and rank
Entered	The date that the album first appeared in the chart.
Peak	Highest position that the album reached in the UK Albums Chart.

Entered (week ending)	Weeks in top 10	Album	Artist	Peak	Peak reached (week ending)	Weeks at peak
Albums in 2007
24 November 2007	26	Spirit ‡	Leona Lewis	1	24 November 2007	8
Albums in 2008
23 February 2008	7	Thriller 25 ‡	Michael Jackson	3	23 February 2008	1
15 March 2008	42	Rockferry ‡	Duffy	1	15 March 2008	5
29 March 2008	8	The Seldom Seen Kid ‡	Elbow	5	29 March 2008	2
31 May 2008	14	We Started Nothing ‡	The Ting Tings	1	31 May 2008	1
23 August 2008	12	The Script ‡	The Script	1	23 August 2008	3
13 September 2008	4	King of Pop ‡	Michael Jackson	3	13 September 2008	1
4 October 2008	40	Only By the Night ‡ (#5)	Kings of Leon	1	4 October 2008	4
4 October 2008	6	The Best Bette ‡	Bette Midler	6	4 October 2008	2
11 October 2008	13	Songs for You, Truths for Me ‡	James Morrison	3	11 October 2008	1
11 October 2008	2	I Started Out with Nothin and I Still Got Most of It Left ‡	Seasick Steve	9	11 October 2008	2
8 November 2008	14	Funhouse ‡	Pink	1	8 November 2008	1
15 November 2008	9	Out of Control ‡	Girls Aloud	1	15 November 2008	1
22 November 2008	6	The Promise ‡	Il Divo	1	22 November 2008	1
22 November 2008	8	Decade in the Sun: Best of Stereophonics ‡	Stereophonics	2	22 November 2008	1
29 November 2008	22	I Am... Sasha Fierce (#7)	Beyoncé	2	22 August 2009	1
6 December 2008	13	Day & Age ‡	The Killers	1	6 December 2008	1
13 December 2008	12	The Circus ‡	Take That	1	13 December 2008	5
Albums in 2009
10 January 2009	2	The Sound of Girls Aloud: The Greatest Hits	Girls Aloud	6	10 January 2009	1
17 January 2009	2	Oracular Spectacular	MGMT	8	17 January 2009	1
24 January 2009	71	The Fame (#2)	Lady Gaga	1	11 April 2009	7
31 January 2009	2	To Lose My Life...	White Lies	1	31 January 2009	1
31 January 2009	2	We Sing. We Dance. We Steal Things.	Jason Mraz	8	31 January 2009	1
31 January 2009	1	Chasing Lights	The Saturdays	9	31 January 2009	1
7 February 2009	3	Working on a Dream	Bruce Springsteen	1	7 February 2009	2
7 February 2009	1	Tonight: Franz Ferdinand	Franz Ferdinand	2	7 February 2009	1
14 February 2009	4	Fleet Foxes	Fleet Foxes	3	14 February 2009	1
14 February 2009	1	Which Bitch?	The View	4	14 February 2009	1
21 February 2009	17	It's Not Me, It's You (#9)	Lily Allen	1	21 February 2009	1
21 February 2009	1	Love Songs	UB40	3	21 February 2009	1
21 February 2009	1	Lovesongs	Luther Vandross	4	21 February 2009	1
21 February 2009	1	The Fray	The Fray	8	21 February 2009	1
21 February 2009	1	The Duets	Luciano Pavarotti	10	21 February 2009	1
28 February 2009	1	Years of Refusal	Morrissey	3	28 February 2009	1
7 March 2009	13	Invaders Must Die	The Prodigy	1	7 March 2009	1
14 March 2009	4	No Line on the Horizon	U2	1	14 March 2009	2
21 March 2009	7	The Annie Lennox Collection	Annie Lennox	2	21 March 2009	2
21 March 2009	3	All I Ever Wanted	Kelly Clarkson	3	21 March 2009	1
21 March 2009	1	Fearless	Taylor Swift	5	21 March 2009	1
21 March 2009	2	Faryl	Faryl Smith	4	28 March 2009	1
28 March 2009	4	Songs for My Mother	Ronan Keating	1	28 March 2009	2
28 March 2009	1	Just Go	Lionel Richie	10	28 March 2009	1
4 April 2009	1	Yes	Pet Shop Boys	4	4 April 2009	1
4 April 2009	6	Freedom	Akon	6	25 April 2009	1
11 April 2009	1	R.O.O.T.S. (Route of Overcoming the Struggle)	Flo Rida	5	11 April 2009	1
18 April 2009	2	Kingdom of Rust	Doves	2	18 April 2009	1
18 April 2009	1	Two Suns	Bat for Lashes	5	18 April 2009	1
18 April 2009	1	It's Blitz!	Yeah Yeah Yeahs	9	18 April 2009	1
25 April 2009	1	Footsteps	Chris de Burgh	4	25 April 2009	1
2 May 2009	1	Sounds of the Universe	Depeche Mode	2	2 May 2009	1
2 May 2009	4	Wild Young Hearts	The Noisettes	7	2 May 2009	1
9 May 2009	3	Together Through Life	Bob Dylan	1	9 May 2009	2
9 May 2009	2	Music for the People	The Enemy	2	9 May 2009	1
9 May 2009	1	Doll Domination – The Mini Collection (EP)	The Pussycat Dolls	9	9 May 2009	1
16 May 2009	1	Fantasy Ride	Ciara	9	16 May 2009	1
16 May 2009	1	Roadsinger	Yusuf	10	16 May 2009	1
23 May 2009	4	21st Century Breakdown	Green Day	1	23 May 2009	1
23 May 2009	1	Quicken the Heart	Maxïmo Park	6	23 May 2009	1
23 May 2009	4	The Very Best of Jim Reeves	Jim Reeves	7	27 June 2009	1
30 May 2009	4	Relapse	Eminem	1	30 May 2009	2
30 May 2009	1	Journal for Plague Lovers	Manic Street Preachers	3	30 May 2009	1
30 May 2009	1	The Liberty of Norton Folgate	Madness	5	30 May 2009	1
6 June 2009	2	Escala	Escala	2	6 June 2009	1
6 June 2009	2	Pink Box	Pink	7	6 June 2009	1
6 June 2009	1	Graffiti Soul	Simple Minds	10	6 June 2009	1
13 June 2009	38	Sunny Side Up (#8)	Paolo Nutini	1	13 June 2009	4
13 June 2009	4	Love & War	Daniel Merriweather	2	13 June 2009	1
13 June 2009	1	Passione	Paul Potts	5	13 June 2009	1
20 June 2009	9	West Ryder Pauper Lunatic Asylum	Kasabian	1	20 June 2009	2
20 June 2009	26	The E.N.D. (#4)	The Black Eyed Peas	3	20 June 2009	8
20 June 2009	1	Hands	Little Boots	5	20 June 2009	1
20 June 2009	4	Greatest Hits	Bruce Springsteen & E Street Band	3	27 June 2009	1
20 June 2009	1	Battle for the Sun	Placebo	8	20 June 2009	1
27 June 2009	1	Let It Roll: Songs by George Harrison	George Harrison	4	27 June 2009	1
27 June 2009	1	Lines, Vines and Trying Times	Jonas Brothers	9	27 June 2009	1
27 June 2009	1	Hits Out of Hell	Meat Loaf	10	27 June 2009	1
4 July 2009	4	Number Ones	Michael Jackson	1	4 July 2009	1
4 July 2009	5	Thriller	Michael Jackson	3	25 July 2009	1
11 July 2009	10	The Essential Michael Jackson	Michael Jackson	1	11 July 2009	7
11 July 2009	8	La Roux	La Roux	2	11 July 2009	1
11 July 2009	3	Off the Wall	Michael Jackson	3	18 July 2009	1
18 July 2009	33	Lungs ♦	Florence + the Machine	1	23 January 2010	2
18 July 2009	2	The Motown Years	Michael Jackson & The Jackson 5	4	25 July 2009	1
18 July 2009	2	Evacuate the Dancefloor	Cascada	8	18 July 2009	1
8 August 2009	1	Foot of the Mountain	A-ha	5	8 August 2009	1
15 August 2009	1	Bad	Michael Jackson	9	15 August 2009	1
15 August 2009	1	The Best of Chicane: 1996–2008	Chicane	10	15 August 2009	1
22 August 2009	1	The Stone Roses	The Stone Roses	5	22 August 2009	1
29 August 2009	3	Ready for the Weekend	Calvin Harris	1	29 August 2009	1
29 August 2009	2	Catch 22	Tinchy Stryder	2	29 August 2009	1
5 September 2009	3	Humbug	Arctic Monkeys	1	5 September 2009	2
5 September 2009	5	One Love	David Guetta	2	5 September 2009	1
12 September 2009	8	We'll Meet Again: The Very Best of Vera Lynn	Vera Lynn	1	19 September 2009	1
19 September 2009	1	Kings & Queens	Jamie T	2	19 September 2009	1
19 September 2009	1	Sgt. Pepper's Lonely Hearts Club Band	The Beatles	5	19 September 2009	1
19 September 2009	1	Abbey Road	The Beatles	6	19 September 2009	1
19 September 2009	1	Ignore the Ignorant	The Cribs	8	19 September 2009	1
19 September 2009	1	Revolver	The Beatles	9	19 September 2009	1
19 September 2009	1	Rubber Soul	The Beatles	10	19 September 2009	1
26 September 2009	6	The Resistance	Muse	1	26 September 2009	1
26 September 2009	2	Revelation	Peter Andre	3	26 September 2009	1
26 September 2009	6	The Blueprint 3	Jay-Z	4	26 September 2009	1
26 September 2009	1	Draw the Line	David Gray	5	26 September 2009	1
26 September 2009	6	Turn It Up	Pixie Lott	6	26 September 2009	1
26 September 2009	1	Get Lucky	Mark Knopfler	9	26 September 2009	1
3 October 2009	4	Celebration	Madonna	1	3 October 2009	1
3 October 2009	4	Tongue n' Cheek	Dizzee Rascal	3	3 October 2009	1
3 October 2009	1	The Boy Who Knew Too Much	Mika	4	3 October 2009	1
3 October 2009	3	Reunited – Cliff Richard and The Shadows	Cliff Richard & The Shadows	4	17 October 2009	1
3 October 2009	1	Backspacer	Pearl Jam	9	3 October 2009	1
10 October 2009	2	Brand New Eyes	Paramore	1	10 October 2009	1
10 October 2009	1	Rebuilt by Humans	Newton Faulkner	3	10 October 2009	1
10 October 2009	3	Love Is the Answer	Barbra Streisand	1	17 October 2009	1
10 October 2009	1	My Way	Ian Brown	8	10 October 2009	1
17 October 2009	1	Still So Far to Go: The Best of Chris Rea	Chris Rea	8	17 October 2009	1
17 October 2009	1	The Very Best of Andy Williams	Andy Williams	10	17 October 2009	1
24 October 2009	1	In This Light and on This Evening	Editors	1	24 October 2009	1
24 October 2009	2	I Am Chipmunk	Chipmunk	2	24 October 2009	1
24 October 2009	1	She Wolf	Shakira	4	24 October 2009	1
24 October 2009	1	Wordshaker	The Saturdays	9	24 October 2009	1
31 October 2009	3	Overcome	Alexandra Burke	1	31 October 2009	1
31 October 2009	36	Crazy Love ♦ (#3)	Michael Bublé	1	2 January 2010	1
31 October 2009	2	I Look to You	Whitney Houston	3	31 October 2009	1
31 October 2009	1	Man from Another Time	Seasick Steve	4	31 October 2009	1
31 October 2009	2	The Very Best of Fleetwood Mac	Fleetwood Mac	6	31 October 2009	1
31 October 2009	1	Once More	Spandau Ballet	7	31 October 2009	1
31 October 2009	1	Do You Want the Truth or Something Beautiful?	Paloma Faith	9	31 October 2009	1
7 November 2009	4	3 Words	Cheryl	1	7 November 2009	2
7 November 2009	2	Michael Jackson's This Is It	Michael Jackson	3	7 November 2009	1
7 November 2009	4	Coming Home	The Soldiers	4	7 November 2009	2
7 November 2009	1	Believe	Katherine Jenkins	6	7 November 2009	1
7 November 2009	1	Peace in the Valley	Daniel O'Donnell	8	7 November 2009	1
14 November 2009	1	The Circle	Bon Jovi	2	14 November 2009	1
14 November 2009	2	Greatest Hits	Foo Fighters	4	14 November 2009	1
14 November 2009	1	The Ultimate Collection	Katherine Jenkins	9	14 November 2009	1
21 November 2009	9	JLS (#6)	JLS	1	21 November 2009	1
21 November 2009	7	Reality Killed the Video Star (#10)	Robbie Williams	2	21 November 2009	1
21 November 2009	8	Up to Now	Snow Patrol	3	21 November 2009	1
21 November 2009	4	Only Revolutions ♦	Biffy Clyro	3	11 September 2010	1
21 November 2009	2	Soulbook	Rod Stewart	9	19 December 2009	1
28 November 2009	4	Echo	Leona Lewis	1	28 November 2009	1
28 November 2009	4	Absolute Greatest	Queen	3	28 November 2009	1
28 November 2009	1	Against All Odds	N-Dubz	6	28 November 2009	1
28 November 2009	5	The Hits ♦	Will Young	7	9 January 2010	1
5 December 2009	7	I Dreamed a Dream (#1)	Susan Boyle	1	5 December 2009	4
12 December 2009	3	Where We Are	Westlife	2	12 December 2009	1
12 December 2009	4	The Greatest Day – Take That Present: The Circus Live	Take That	3	12 December 2009	1

== Entries by artist ==
The following table shows artists who achieved two or more top 10 entries in 2009, including albums that reached their peak in 2008. The figures only include main artists, with featured artists and appearances on compilation albums not counted individually for each artist. The total number of weeks an artist spent in the top ten in 2009 is also shown.

Entries	Artist	Weeks	Albums
9	Michael Jackson	37	Bad, King of Pop, Michael Jackson's This Is It, Number Ones, Off the Wall, The Essential Michael Jackson, The Motown Years, Thriller, Thriller 25
5	George Harrison	5	Abbey Road, Let It Roll: Songs by George Harrison, Revolver, Rubber Soul, Sgt. Pepper's Lonely Hearts Club Band
4	The Beatles	4	Abbey Road, Revolver, Rubber Soul, Sgt. Pepper's Lonely Hearts Club Band
3	Cheryl	6	3 Words, Out of Control, The Sound of Girls Aloud: The Greatest Hits
2	Bruce Springsteen	7	Greatest Hits, Working on a Dream
2	Girls Aloud	3	Out of Control, The Sound of Girls Aloud: The Greatest Hits
2	Ian Brown	2	My Way, The Stone Roses: 20th Anniversary Special Edition
2	Katherine Jenkins	2	Believe, The Ultimate Collection
2	Leona Lewis	8	Echo, Spirit
2	Pink	9	Funhouse, Pink Box
2	The Saturdays	2	Chasing Lights, Wordshaker
2	Seasick Steve	2	I Started Out with Nothin and I Still Got Most of It Left, Man from Another Time
2	Take That	12	The Circus, The Greatest Day – Take That Present: The Circus Live

== Notes ==
- Lungs reached its peak of number-one on 23 January 2010 (week ending).
- Thriller 25 re-entered the top 10 at number 9 on 18 July 2009 (week ending) after the death of Michael Jackson.
- Rockferry re-entered the top 10 at number 4 on 28 February 2009 (week ending) for 3 weeks.
- The Seldom Seen Kid re-entered the top 10 at number 6 on 14 February 2009 (week ending) and at number 5 on 28 February 2009 (week ending) for 3 weeks.
- We Started Nothing re-entered the top 10 at number 9 on 17 January 2009 (week ending) and at number 8 on 28 February 2009 (week ending) for 3 weeks.
- The Script re-entered the top 10 at number 8 on 10 January 2009 (week ending) for 6 weeks.
- King of Pop re-entered the top 10 at number 5 on 11 July 2009 (week ending) after the death of Michael Jackson.
- Only By the Night re-entered the top 10 at number 6 on 27 June 2009 (week ending) for 2 weeks and at number 4 on 12 September 2009 (week ending) for 4 weeks.
- The Best Bette re-entered the top 10 at number 6 on 21 February 2009 (week ending) and at number 9 on 28 March 2009 (week ending).
- Songs for You, Truths for Me re-entered the top 10 at number 7 on 17 January 2009 (week ending) for 6 weeks, at number 9 on 11 April 2009 (week ending), at number 9 on 25 April 2009 (week ending) and at number 9 on 5 September 2009 (week ending) for 2 weeks.
- I Started Out with Nothin and I Still Got Most of It Left re-entered the top 10 at number 9 on 28 February 2009 (week ending).
- Funhouse re-entered the top 10 at number 10 on 3 January 2009 (week ending) and at number 10 on 2 May 2009 (week ending) for 6 weeks.
- I Am... Sasha Fierce re-entered the top 10 at number 10 on 11 April 2009 (week ending) for 9 weeks and at number 5 on 15 August 2009 (week ending) for 4 weeks.
- Day & Age re-entered the top 10 at number 10 on 7 February 2009 (week ending) for 5 weeks.
- The Circus re-entered the top 10 at number 8 on 7 March 2009 (week ending) for 4 weeks and at number 4 on 4 July 2009 (week ending).
- The Sound of Girls Aloud: The Greatest Hits originally peaked at number-one upon its initial release in 2006.
- Oracular Spectacular re-entered the top 10 at number 10 on 31 January 2009 (week ending).
- The Fame re-entered the top 10 at number 5 on 4 July 2009 (week ending) for 9 weeks. Following the release of The Fame Monster, it re-entered the top 10 at number 7 on 5 December 2009 (week ending) and at number 2 on 19 December 2009 (week ending) for 41 weeks.
- Fleet Foxes re-entered the top 10 at number 10 on 28 February 2009 (week ending) for 3 weeks.
- It's Not Me, It's You re-entered the top 10 at number 6 on 4 April 2009 (week ending) for 12 weeks.
- Invaders Must Die re-entered the top 10 at number 7 on 4 April 2009 (week ending) for 2 weeks and at number 10 on 25 April 2009 (week ending) for 8 weeks.
- Wild Young Hearts re-entered the top 10 at number 9 on 1 August 2009 (week ending) for 2 weeks and at number 9 on 22 August 2009 (week ending).
- Pink Box includes three of Pink's studio albums (I'm Not Dead, Missundaztood and Try This) along with the DVD Pink: Live in Europe, a recording of a show from her Try This tour, filmed in Manchester in 2004.
- Sunny Side Up re-entered the top 10 at number 6 on 25 July 2009 (week ending) for 8 weeks, at number 5 on 24 October 2009 (week ending) for 3 weeks, at number-one on 9 January 2010 (week ending) for 19 weeks and at number 8 on 14 August 2010 (week ending) for 3 weeks.
- West Ryder Pauper Lunatic Asylum re-entered the top 10 at number 10 on 1 August 2009 (week ending) for 5 weeks.
- The E.N.D. re-entered the top 10 at number 8 on 1 August 2009 (week ending) for 7 weeks, at number 10 on 14 November 2009 (week ending) for 10 weeks, at number 10 on 20 February 2010 (week ending) for 2 weeks, at number 10 on 15 May 2010 (week ending) for 2 weeks and at number 3 on 3 July 2010 (week ending) for 2 weeks.
- Hits Out of Hell originally peaked at number 2 upon its initial release in 1985.
- Number Ones originally peaked at number-one upon its initial release in 2003. It returned to the top 10 after the death of Michael Jackson.
- Thriller originally peaked at number-one upon its initial release in 1982. It returned to the top 10 after the death of Michael Jackson.
- The Essential Michael Jackson originally peaked at number 2 upon its initial release in 2005. It returned to the top 10 at a new peak of number-one after the death of Michael Jackson.
- Off the Wall originally peaked at number 5 upon its initial release in 1979. It returned to the top 10, rising to a new peak of number three, after the death of Michael Jackson.
- Bad originally peaked at number-one upon its initial release in 1987. It returned to the top 10 after the death of Michael Jackson.
- Lungs re-entered the top 10 at number 10 on 26 September 2009 (week ending), at number 6 on 9 January 2010 (week ending) for 17 weeks, at number 6 on 15 May 2010 (week ending) for 5 weeks and at number 10 on 31 July 2010 (week ending).
- The Stone Roses originally peaked outside the top ten at number 19 upon its initial release in 1989. It entered the top 10 for the first time in 2004, peaking at number nine. In 2009, the album was re-released to mark its 20th anniversary and reached its highest peak of number five.
- One Love re-entered the top 10 at number 10 on 10 July 2010 (week ending).
- The Beatles album back catalogue was re-issued in 2009 in digitally remastered versions. They were released individually as well as part of the boxset The Beatles (The Original Studio Recordings).
- Sgt. Pepper's Lonely Hearts Club Band originally charted at its peak of number-one upon its initial release in 1967, spending 27 weeks at the top spot across 1967 and 1968. It was re-issued in 1987 and re-entered the top 10 at number 3 on 13 June 1987 (week ending) for three weeks. It made the top 10 again on 27 June 1992 (week ending), peaking at number 6.
- Abbey Road originally charted at its peak of number-one upon its initial release in 1969, spending 17 weeks at the top spot across 1969 and 1970. It was re-issued in 1987 when it peaked outside the top ten at number 30.
- Revolver originally charted at its peak of number-one upon its initial release in 1966, spending 7 weeks at the top spot that year. It was re-issued in 1987 when it peaked outside the top ten at number 55.
- Rubber Soul originally charted at its peak of number-one upon its initial release in 1965, spending 8 weeks at the top spot across 1965 and 1966. It was re-issued in 1987 when it peaked outside the top ten at number 60.
- The Resistance re-entered the top 10 at number 8 on 9 January 2010 (week ending).
- The Blueprint 3 re-entered the top 10 at number 10 on 27 February 2010 (week ending).
- Turn It Up re-entered the top 10 at number 10 on 23 January 2010 (week ending) for 3 weeks, at number 10 on 19 June 2010 (week ending) and at number 9 on 30 October 2010 (week ending).
- With the album We'll Meet Again: The Very Best of Vera Lynn, she became the oldest living artist (92) to have a number-one album on the UK Album Chart.
- Crazy Love re-entered the top 10 at number 8 on 20 February 2010 (week ending), at number 6 on 20 March 2010 (week ending), at number 2 on 5 June 2010 (week ending) for 5 weeks, at number 10 on 7 August 2010 (week ending) for 5 weeks, at number 7 on 30 October 2010 (week ending) for 11 weeks and at number 7 on 16 April 2011 (week ending).
- The Very Best of Fleetwood Mac originally peaked at number 7 on its initial release in 2002.
- JLS re-entered the top 10 at number 8 on 6 March 2010 (week ending).
- Reality Killed the Video Star re-entered the top 10 at number 6 on 26 December 2009 (week ending) for 2 weeks and at number 8 on 27 February 2010 (week ending).
- Only Revolutions re-entered the top 10 at number 9 on 6 February 2010 (week ending) and at number 3 on 11 September 2010 (week ending) for 2 weeks.
- 3 Words re-entered the top 10 at number 10 on 2 January 2010 (week ending).
- Soulbook re-entered the top 10 at number 9 on 19 December 2009 (week ending).
- Echo re-entered the top 10 at number 9 on 26 December 2009 (week ending).
- Figure includes a top 10 album with the group The Stone Roses.
- Figure includes two top 10 albums with the group Girls Aloud.
- Figure includes four top 10 albums with the group The Beatles.
- Figure includes album that peaked in 2007.
- Figure includes album that peaked in 2008.
- Figure includes album that first charted in 2008 but peaked in 2009.
- Figure includes album that peaked in 2010.

== See also ==
- 2009 in British music
- List of number-one albums from the 2000s (UK)
