= Girl Giant and the Monkey King =

2020 novel by Van Hoang

- Author: Van Hoang
- Language: English
- Genre: Children's fiction
- Published: 2020
- Publisher: Roaring Brook Press
- Publication place: United States
- ISBN: 1250240417
- Followed by: Girl Giant and the Jade War

Girl Giant and the Monkey King is a fantasy novel written by Van Hoang, published by the Roaring Brook Press. The story follows an 11-year-old girl named Thom Ngho, who has superhuman strength and can move objects larger than she is. To get rid of her ability, she makes a deal with the Monkey King, a legendary trickster whom she accidentally released from his 500-year sentence. A sequel, Girl Giant and the Jade War, was published in December 2021.

== Plot ==
Thom is sitting on the bench during a soccer game. When the ball comes to her, Thom accidentally kicks the ball so hard it hits the rival team's goalie. The "dynamic trio", consisting of Bethany Anderson, Sarah Mazel, and Kathy Joon (Korean), is not impressed. The next day, a "Culture Day" event is held which requires students to pair up. Thom does not wish to participate. Together with her Pomeranian dog, she explores the neighbour's house and meets Kha, who is the same race and age as her. He lives with his grandparents and goes to the same school.

When Ma finds out about Culture Day, she cheerily suggests that Thom should wear Áo dài and play the đàn bầu. Thom disagrees, fearing the other students will laugh at her, so Ma brings Thom to Thien Than Temple, where she brags that their culture is better than the Americans' and narrates to her the story of the Boy Giant. At the temple, Thom finds a golden pin that she keeps in her pocket. That night she discovers that the golden pin is actually the Monkey King, whom she has released from his 500-year prison sentence. The next day, Thom scores a goal at soccer, but it still does not impress the "dynamic trio".

When Thom is alone in the classroom, the Monkey King appears and breaks the teacher's calculator before throwing a 70-pound table at Thom, which she is able to catch with one hand. The teacher discovers the mess and sends Thom to the principal's office. Later, when Thom is at home, the principal calls. They get into a heated argument about Thom's life in Thuy. Another day, Thom gets a high fever as a result of an extremely hot shower. The Monkey King offers to take Thom to the Mountain of Flowers and Fruit where the waters can heal Thom. Thom meets the Monkey King's elder brother, Shing-Rhe. She and Shing-Rhe have a good chat about demons and humans and how the whole tribe of monkeys are demons too. After Thom drinks the water, she is completely healed and is taken back home.

The following day, when Kha is invited to discuss Culture Day with Thom, Kha claims he is a dragon sent by Heaven, but Thom does not believe him. After telling the Monkey King about Kha, Thom requests him to take her to California to see her friend Thuy. When they got there, Thuy is now friends with a girl named Amber. The Monkey King takes Thom to a junkyard and orders her to lift heavy vehicles that get heavier each time Thom is able to lift one. The following day, during a soccer match, the invisible Monkey King kicks Thom's leg, which causes the ball to be sent flying. Kha already knew this and tells her not to trust the Monkey King. Kha is invited to dinner as his grandparents are away. He and Thom have decided the topic for their poster will be the Four Immortals. At night, the Monkey King takes Thom to Hell and gets her to arm-wrestle all of the demons. Thom beats all of them easily. She meets a female fox demon named Concao and comes to a realisation that the Monkey King is missing his cudgel.

The next night, the Monkey King plans to get his cudgel back but because his powers would be weaker if he shrunk. He sends Thom to disguise herself as a Lotus student who is here to see the Lotus Master. Thom puts the tiny Monkey King in her ear. However, things go wrong when the Jade Soldiers stop her and plan to put her in the Judgement Veil. Kha arrives and his claim is actually true and is now chasing after Thom as a dragon. A girl named Jae stops Kha and leads Thom to the Lotus Academy. Thom meets the Boy Giant, who is acting just like Ma. Jae gives him an invitation to a banquet and suggests Thom should come. At the banquet, Jae's father is the Jade Emperor. The Monkey King steals Jae's ring, which is the key to the armory. When Thom starts talking about the Monkey King, she is asked to leave. When Thom reaches the armory, she manages to take the cudgel but the Boy Giant stops her and says that she is actually his daughter. An enraged Thom hits her own father with the cudgel and when the Jade Soldiers arrived, Thom manages to defeat all of them with the cudgel too. Kha decides to take Thom home. When Thom gets home, she hides the cudgel. The Culture Day goes well but the Monkey King comes and takes his cudgel. Thom does not allow him because he needs to make her normal. When Ma sees the Monkey King talking to Thom, she is instantly turned into a cricket. Thom temporarily puts Ma the cricket in a jar and leaves her dog under the care of Kathy for some time before leaving with Kha to catch the Monkey King. The story continues in Girl Giant and the Jade War.

== Characters ==
Thom "Thommy" Ngho, also nicknamed c'ung (Vietnamese word for sweetheart or sweetie) or Thom-thom (Often nicknamed by the Monkey King) is a Vietnamese-American 11-year-old girl living in Troy, Georgia. Before she moved to Troy, she would have boba and popcorn chicken with her friends. She loves to play soccer but is afraid of kicking the ball too hard. She meets Kha and the two of them accepted each other and became good friends. After the Monkey King betrayed her, she and Kha set off to catch him.

Ma is a strict woman and a single mother. She would get her daughter, Thom to spend more hours on studying if she got one mistake in a test. It was later revealed that she had married the Boy Giant and when he wanted to take Thom to the Heaven, Ma insisted that Thom live a normal life with Ma. In the end, she is turned into a cricket by the Monkey King.

Kha is Thom's neighbour. His true form is a dragon with bright blue scales. He is the son of the Dragon King of the Jade Army's seventh legion and is sent by the Jade Emperor to protect Thom. Kha is always trying his best to keep Thom away from the Monkey King. Kha's mother is the leader of all the fairies. He is also a nemesis of Jae, the Jade Emperor's daughter but both of them are actually cousins. However, he is not strong as Thom, who could carry the Monkey King's cudgel. After the Monkey King betrayed Thom, he and Thom set off to catch him.

The Monkey King is a mischievous trickster god in this story and is known as the Great Sage of Heaven. He lives in the Mountain of Flowers and Fruit and has an elder brother named Shing-Rhe. He was tired of his demon friends in Hell so he went to Heaven to be a Lotus student and learned the 72 Earthly transformations in centuries. When the deities gave him the lowest position as the Protector of Horses, he flew into a rage and wreaked havoc until Buddha came and sealed him under a mountain. However, one strand of his hair is trapped in the little temple and Thom had freed him. A fact about the Monkey King in his story is that only friends can call the Monkey King by his name. Shing-Rhe is possibly the one who calls him Wukong the most. The Monkey King betrays Thom and flees with his cudgel.

The Boy Giant is a deity in Heaven. When he was human, he was only a baby when invaders came to attack. He ate a lot of rice and manages to defeat all the invaders. The Boy Giant meets Ma and the couple had Thom. He plans to live with his daughter in Heaven to be a deity but Ma insisted that Thom live a normal life with her. When Thom hit him with the Monkey King's cudgel, he survived and tries desperately to stop the Jade Soldiers from attacking Thom out of fatherly love.

Jae is the Jade Emperor's daughter and helped Thom to the Lotus Academy. She seems very polite and loves her father a lot but hates Kha even though she and Kha are actually cousins. Jae wears a ring that is the key to the armory which the Monkey King steals to get his cudgel back.

The Jade Emperor is Jae's father and a close friend of the Boy Giant. He felt offended when Thom talked about the Monkey King and ordered her to leave. When Thom takes the cudgel and hits the Boy Giant with it, the Jade Emperor possibly knew this and sent the Jade Army, consisting of Jade Soldiers, to arrest Thom.

Bethany Anderson is a bully of Thom because of how different she is from the other students. The teachers do not know about it but she is treasured by the soccer coach. Bethany is one of the girls in the "dynamic trio" along with Sarah Mazel and Kathy Joon.

Kathy Joon is a Korean-American student and one of the girls in the "dynamic trio", along with Bethany and Sarah Mazel. When the two other girls are not watching, Kathy is kinder to Thom, especially when they are both Asians.

Sarah Mazel is another bully of Thom and one of the girls in the "dynamic trio".

Cassie Houghton is a goalie. Thom kicked the ball too hard and the ball hits her, causing her to stay in the hospital for a month as a result of breaking a few ribs.

Coach Pendergrass is Thom's soccer coach. She treasures the "dynamic trio" and would compliment Thom when she scored a goal.

Mrs Abbot is Thom's homeroom teacher.

Mrs Colton is the principal of Demille Middle School which is the school Thom attends currently.

== Background ==
Van Hoang used Journey to the West, by Wu Cheng'en, as research for the novel, and was also inspired by stories told by her sister and Asian dramas.

== Reception ==
Overall, the novel received positive reviews.

However, according to commonsensemedia.com, there was a scale of 1 out of 5 dots that indicates how much violence there was. The violence is stated to have "some accidental punches, hits, and knock downs involving immortal gods and demons. There are scenes of bullying, name calling, and laughing at Vietnamese main character for being 'weird' and bringing 'smelly food to lunch.' A soccer goalie's ribs are broken when hit with a ball." The language also received the same scale as a result of the anti-immigrant slurs, such as "fresh off the boat".

The sex got the same scale because the protagonist is "coupling" with a god (This may refer to Thom's relationship with the Monkey King, or her relationship with Kha).
