= Monkey Magic (1999 video game) =

- Developer: Mpen
- Publisher: Sunsoft
- Platform: PlayStation
- Release: NA: November 27, 1999; JP: July 13, 2000
- Genre: Platform
- Mode: Single-player

Monkey Magic (モンキーマジック, Monki Majikku) is a video game developed by Mpen and published by Sunsoft on the PlayStation console.

The game is based on the anime series of the same name, an adaptation of the 16th-century Chinese novel Journey to the West.

It is a sidescrolling action/platform game with a blend of RPG-like elements; unique features include the ability to switch between the foreground, middle, and background layers in some sections, and four magic spells - Fire, Ice, Shrink, and Blossom - which can be cast on either the player's character (to cancel out enemy spells, for instance) or on enemies as a projectile.
