= Chen Shi-Zheng =

Chinese-born American theatre director

- Born: 1963 (age 62–63); Changsha, Hunan, China
- Education: Hunan Art School in Traditional Opera; New York University Tisch School of the Arts
- Occupations: Theater and film director

Chinese name
- Simplified Chinese: 陈士争
- Traditional Chinese: 陳士爭
Transcriptions
Standard Mandarin
- Hanyu Pinyin: Chén Shìzhēng

Chen Shi-Zheng (Chinese: 陈士争; pinyin: Chén Shìzhēng; born 1963 in Changsha, Hunan, China) is a New York–based theater and film director.

Having earned a BA from the Hunan Art School in Traditional Opera, he received his MA from New York University Tisch School of the Arts. In 2000, Chen was awarded the title Chevalier des Arts et des Lettres by the French Ministry of Culture.

In 1991 Chen played Chen Qing in the premiere production of Meredith Monk's opera Atlas, which was commissioned by Houston Grand Opera.

In 1999 Chen directed a production of the complete Kunqu opera The Peony Pavilion, which was commissioned by the Lincoln Center Festival; comprising 55 scenes and lasting between 18 and 20 hours, it was the first time in approximately 300 years that the work had been staged in its entirety. The production premiered at the concert hall of Fiorello H. LaGuardia High School in Manhattan, then went on tour to Caen, Paris, Milan, Perth, Aarhus, Berlin, Vienna, and Singapore in 1999 and 2000. A 2-hour abridged version was released on DVD in 2001.

Chen's directorial debut film, Dark Matter, was released in 2007, starring Liu Ye and Meryl Streep. This film won the Alfred P. Sloan Prize at the 2007 Sundance Film Festival. He also directed Damon Albarn and Jamie Hewlett's operatic stage adaptation of Monkey: Journey to the West at the Manchester International Festival in June and July 2007. In 2008, he directed the premiere production of Stewart Wallace's opera The Bonesetter's Daughter at the San Francisco Opera. In 2011, he directed High School Musical: China.

== See also ==
- Showtunes (Stephin Merritt and Chen Shi-zheng album)
