= Monkey Magic (Japanese TV series) =

Japanese anime television series

モンキーマジック (Monkī Majikku)
- Genre: Action, Adventure, Shenmo
- Anime television series
- Directed by: Tameo Kohanawa
- Produced by: Takashi Sakurai
- Written by: Sōji Yoshikawa; Larry Parr
- Music by: Alex Wilkinson; Shun Suzuki
- Studio: Group TAC
- Licensed by: Bandai Entertainment (former); Discotek Media (current)
- Original network: First-run syndication (United States); TV Tokyo (Japan)
- Original run: September 19, 1998 – December 12, 1998 (U.S.)
- Episodes: 13

Monkey Magic (モンキーマジック, Monkī Majikku) is an animated television series produced by B-Factory and animated by Group TAC. The story is an adaptation of the 16th-century novel Journey to the West. To avoid religious implications, the Buddha was named "The Guardian". The series was distributed in the United States by Sachs Family Entertainment and aired there in syndication from September 19 to December 12, 1998, with reruns lasting until September 26, 1999. Bandai Entertainment released Monkey Magic on VHS and DVD in the United States in mid-1999. Additionally, the series aired in Japan on TV Tokyo from December 31, 1999, to March 25, 2000. Sunsoft produced a PlayStation video game based on the series.

== Characters ==
=== Main characters ===
Kongo (Sun Wukong or Goku)
Kongo is the main character. In the series, Kongo is portrayed as a brash yet virtuous monkey, who seeks to gain divine powers in order to become the strongest warrior there is.
Sanzoh
Sanzoh is the incarnation of the tang priest known as Tang Sanzang.
Runlay (White Dragon Horse)
Runlay is a Chinese dragon that serves as a principal character in the series who accompanies Kongo and Sanzoh on their journey west. She is the daughter of a dragon king, and possesses great supernatural abilities to disguise her appearance and conjure storms through the use of her dragon globe, a magical orb that serves as the source of her magic.

=== Members of Celestial Heavens ===
The Jade Emperor (Jade Emperor)
The Jade Emperor is a rather old man that sits atop his throne, which is supported by a large golden dragon statue. Overall, the Jade Emperor is a pacifist in his ways.
The Empress Dowager (Queen Mother of the West)
The queen of the Celestial Heaven and the wife of the Jade Emperor.
Fujin (Taibai Jinxing)
A high-ranking official of the Celestial Heavens. Fujin acts as the primary messenger of the Jade Emperor.
Prince Nata (Nehza)
A high-ranking official within the Celestial Heavens. Nata is a rather young child and rides atop a carpet like jet cloud. He is the son of the Celestial General of the South, and is a warrior with skills that rival Refang's, the strongest warrior of the Celestial Heavens.
Lao Tzu
The royal alchemist and top scientist of the Celestial Heaven, and is considered the smartest person there.

=== Members of the Underworld ===
Dearth Voyd
The main enemy throughout the Monkey Magic series. Dearth Voyd is present within the underworld area, in which he resides within a large castle like area with a revolving sun like blade behind. Just like the Guardian plays the role of God in the series, Dearth Voyd one is similar to the Devil, given his desire to destroy the Guardian's teachings and deep hatred towards all that is good.
Slime Lord
Slime Lord is a large chef themed eel who enjoys being the # 1 cook under Dearth Voyd.

=== Deities ===
The Guardian (The Buddha)
Literally translating as Lord Buddha. "The Guardian" is meant to be the legendary most powerful of all Buddha's – the Tathagata Buddha.
Lady Blossom (Guanyin)
Lady Blossom is the incarnation of Bodhisattva Guanyin, a major entity during their journey.

== Credits ==
=== Cast (Japan) ===
- Gokuu: Shoutarou Morikubo
- Sanzo: Megumi Tano
- Motoboss: Hisao Egawa
- Motte: Satsuki Yukino
- Akakesu: Yuji Ueda
- Jiji: Katsuhisa Hōki
- Prince Naada: Fujiko Takimoto
- Jirou Shinkun: Tōru Furusawa
- Jade Emperor: Tomohisa Asō
- Taihakku: Chafurin
- Bukyoku: Kōji Ishii
- Senrigan: Konami Yoshida
- Junpuuji: Masaya Onosaka
- Lao-Tzu: Keiichi Sonobe
- Queen Mother of the West: Rin Mizuhara
- Urabuddha: Fumihiko Tachiki
- Batty: Wataru Takagi
- Master Subodye: Kōichi Kitamura
- Kudai: Kentarō Itō
- Kidai: Hiroyuki Yoshino
- Kadai: Shigenori Sōya
- Bosatsu: Ai Satō
- The Buddha: Hikaru Hanada
- Manriki Daiou: Hideyuki Umezu
- Ronrei: Yuko Sasamoto

=== Staff (series) ===
- Series Director: Tameo Kohanawa
- CG Director: Hiroshi Arima
- Original Character Design: Susumu Matsushita
- Character Design: Masahiko Ohta
- Music: Alex Wilkinson epi 2-13, Shun Suzuki
- Script: Larry Parr, Soji Yoshikawa
- Editing: Kouichi Katagiri
- CG Producer: Hiroshi Arima
- Producer: Takashi Sakurai
- Production: 1998 S. Matsushita Co.*B-F/Monkey Magic Productions

=== Cast (United States) ===
- Kongo/Sarge: Sam Vincent
- Fanya/Blossom: Kathleen Barr
- Sanzoh/Redchimp: Richard Ian Cox
- Wowser/Sonicmate/Fujin/Lao Tzu: Terry Klassen
- Prince Nata: Andrew Francis
- Refang/Milesight/additional voices: Scott McNeil
- Runlay: Rochelle Greenwood
- Batty: Michael Dobson

Opening

1. "Holy Mission" by Raphael (Episodes: 1-13)

Ending

1. "F" by Angelique (Episodes: 1-13)

U.S. (Monkey Magic TV)

Opening
(1-13) "Monkey Magic" by Thomas Marolda
Ending
(1-13) "Kiotoshi" from the CD release "Gaia-Onbashira" by Kitaro
