= UK Chinese Ensemble =

UK Chinese Music Ensemble (UK Chinese Music/UKCM)
- Headquarters: Great Britain

The UK Chinese Music Ensemble (short for UK Chinese Music or UKCM)is a Chinese music ensemble that was founded in 1994 by Chinese virtuosi resident in Britain. The ensemble seeks to promote a wide variety of traditional repertoires as well as exploring contemporary styles. In addition to regular concerts, the ensemble presents workshops and other out-reach activities. Since its founding, the ensemble has performed in several European countries. In the United Kingdom the ensemble has been featured at the Edinburgh International Festival, the Jersey Folk Music Festival and the Royal Festival Hall in London. Its members include pipa player Cheng Yu.

== See also ==
- Journey to the West (soundtrack) 2008 collaboration of the UK Chinese Ensemble with Damon Albarn
