= Monkey: Journey to the West =

Stage adaptation of novel

- Promotional artwork. Image by Jamie Hewlett
- Music: Damon Albarn
- Lyrics: Chen Shi-Zheng
- Basis: Journey to the West
- Productions: Manchester International Festival (2007), Théâtre du Châtelet, Paris (2007), Spoleto Festival USA, Charleston (2008), Royal Opera House London (2008), O2 Arena, London (2008/9), Lincoln Center New York (2013)

Monkey: Journey to the West is a stage adaptation of the 16th-century novel Journey to the West by Wu Cheng'en. It was conceived and created by the Chinese actor and director Chen Shi-Zheng along with British musician Damon Albarn and British artist Jamie Hewlett.

== Development ==
In 2004, Chinese opera director Chen Shi-Zheng approached Jean-Luc Choplin of the Théâtre du Châtelet, Paris, about staging an opera based on Wu Cheng'en's 16th-century novel Journey to the West. Chen had worked with the writer David Greenspan on an outline dramaturgy, but had not identified a composer for the project. Choplin spoke about the proposal to Alex Poots, director of the Manchester International Festival, who suggested a number of composers he had worked with, as well as the British musician Damon Albarn.

Gorillaz, comprising Albarn and artist Jamie Hewlett, were around this time involved with the Manchester International Festival in planning a residency under the auspices of the festival at the Manchester Opera House. Albarn was interested in the idea of writing an opera for the festival, and so he and Hewlett met with Poots and Choplin to discuss a collaboration with Chen. Albarn and Hewlett then travelled to China to meet with Chen. Chen took them into the Chinese countryside, where they took photographs and field recordings of folk musicians as a basis from which to develop musical and visual ideas for the production. Albarn and Hewlett returned to the UK and worked separately on its musical and visual aspects. Chen undertook casting auditions in Beijing, assisted at first by Hewlett and David Coulter, who was to be a musical advisor to the project.

Cast rehearsals took place in Paris, where the costumes and set designed by Hewlett were being produced, and then in Manchester.

== Musicians ==
Albarn and Coulter assembled a 25-member orchestra featuring traditional Western and Chinese instruments, as well as musical saw, ondes Martenot, glass harmonica and a klaxophone, which features car-horns attached to a musical keyboard, which was purpose-built for the production by artist Gavin Turk. Strings were performed by a string section assembled for Gorillaz live performances. Albarn devised a system for the score based on the Chinese red star. The orchestra was joined by an eight-piece choir provided by Liverpool-based Sense of Sound.

== Performances ==
The production received its world premiere as the opening show of the inaugural Manchester International Festival, on 28 June 2007 at the Palace Theatre, Manchester, where it ran until 7 July. The Festival also ran a programme of educational workshops in local schools, in partnership with Manchester's Chinese Arts Centre. In the programme, local children were introduced to the tale of Journey to the West, and learnt about various aspects of Chinese culture, music and dance, including mask-making, puppet-making, tai chi and kung fu.

It was subsequently staged at the Théâtre du Châtelet in Paris between 26 September – 13 October 2007 and at the Spoleto Festival USA in Charleston, SC in May 2008. A further run was planned for the Berlin Staatsoper in July 2008, but instead took place at the London Royal Opera House. The show also ran at the O2 arena in London, ending on 4 January 2009.

A residency for the show in China during 2009 was considered.

Monkey: Journey to the West opened the 2013 Lincoln Center Festival in July.

== Synopsis ==
- Scene 1: Birth of Monkey and His Quest for Immortality

Monkey hatches from a stone egg and makes his home in the forest. Over time, he becomes obsessed with seeking immortality, and travels the world to find a teacher. He finds Subodhi in the Mountain of Heart and Mind, who gives him the name Sun Wu Kong — the Monkey with the Realisation of Emptiness.

- Scene 2: Crystal Palace of the Eastern Sea and the Iron Rod

Monkey dives into the Eastern Sea and comes across the Crystal Palace of the Old Dragon King, where he requests to be given a weapon. He is given a magical iron rod, and the Old Dragon King is also cowed into giving him his helmet, armour and shoes.

- Scene 3: Heavenly Peach Banquet

Monkey travels to heaven to demand recognition of his newfound power. There he finds seven fairies preparing a banquet for the birthday of the Queen Mother of Heaven. Incensed that he has not been invited, he begins to eat the Queen Mother's magical heavenly peaches, and fights off each of her divine guests who try to prevent this. The Queen Mother then calls upon Buddha to deal with Monkey.

- Scene 4: Buddha's Great Palm

Buddha presents Monkey with the challenge of escaping his palm. Monkey is unable to do so, and so he is imprisoned by Buddha.

- Scene 5: The Pilgrims

Five hundred years later, Guan Yin chooses Tripitaka to go on a mission to bring back the Holy Scriptures from India. Pigsy, Sandy, the Dragon Prince (who is transformed into Tripitaka's white horse for the journey) and Monkey (released by Tripitaka from his prison) are chosen to accompany him.

- Scene 6: The White Skeleton Demon

Believing she can achieve immortality by eating Tripitaka's flesh, the White Skeleton Demon adopts disguises in an attempt to fool Tripitaka and his companions. Monkey sees through the disguises, and on each occasion kills the White Skeleton Demon. Tripitaka, however, is horrified by Monkey's display of violence and expels him from the group.

- Scene 7: The Spider Woman

Tripitaka and the other pilgrims travel to the cave of the Spider Woman, who tries to seduce Tripitaka. Pigsy is distracted by the Spider Woman's sexy companions, allowing the Spider Woman to trap Tripitaka. Sandy rushes off to find Monkey, who then defeats the Spider Woman. Feeling sorry for expelling Monkey, Tripitaka asks Monkey to rejoin the group and so he does.

- Scene 8: Volcano City

The group travels to a volcano. The only way to pass is to extinguish the volcano using a magic fan belonging to Princess Iron Fan. She refuses to give the fan, and at first Monkey is unable to defeat her. With help from Guan Yin, he transforms himself into a bee, which the Princess swallows, and Monkey is able to defeat her from inside. He claims the fan, and the group continues on its journey.

- Scene 9: Paradise

The group arrives in paradise, and is given the scriptures by Buddha. Tripitaka is created Buddha of the Purest Merit. Pigsy is made Janitor of the Altars. Sandy becomes a Golden-bodied Arhat. The white horse becomes the Dragon prince once more. Monkey is made Buddha Victorious in Strife.

== Soundtrack ==
A CD based on the opera was released in August 2008. Because Albarn felt that stage performances "always sound false on record", he decided to revisit his original ideas for the music and create new arrangements of the key songs from the opera. The album entered the UK Albums Chart at number five and the UK indie chart at number one. The track "Monkey Bee" entered the UK Singles Chart based on downloads alone at number 196.

== 2008 Olympics ==
Hewlett and Albarn included characters from Monkey: Journey to the West in an animation sequence titled "Journey to the East", used by the BBC as a trailer and the title sequence for their coverage of the 2008 Summer Olympics, held in Beijing. They regarded criticism of their cultural engagement with the event as hypocritical, whilst acknowledging human rights issues in China. According to Hewlett: "If you start to boycott China...America has to be next".

== 2007 cast and crew ==
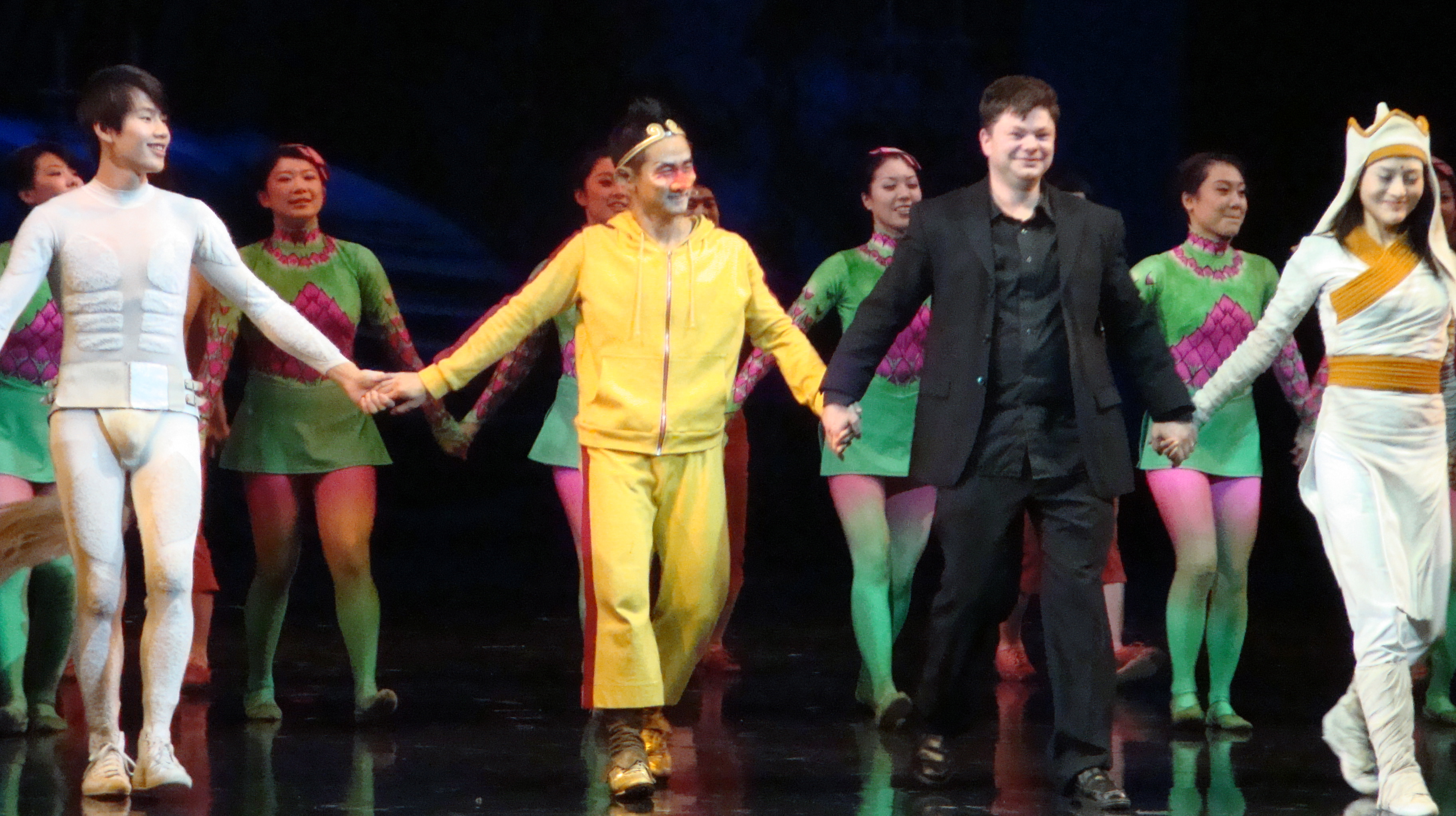
Curtain call at the O2 Arena, London, 2008, featuring Chen Jihu as the White Horse, Cao Yu as Monkey and Yao Ningning as Tripitaka.

Cast

- The Monkey King: Fei Yang/Yang Fukai (understudy)
- Tripitaka: Yao Ningning
- Pigsy: Xu Kejia
- Sandy: He Zijun
- The White Horse: Chen Jihu/Wang Kai
- Subodhi/Buddha: Liu Chang
- White Skeleton Demon/Princess Iron Fan: Tang Ling
- Queen Mother of Heaven/Guan Yin: Jia Ruhan
- The Dragon King: Wang Wei
- Spider Woman: Zeng Li
- The Volcano General: Yu Fengnian

Crew

- Acrobatic Director: Yang Jiansheng
- Martial Arts Director: Zhang Jinhghua
- Aerial Director: Caroline Vexler
- Musical score: Damon Albarn
- Musical Director: David Coulter
- Conductor: André de Ridder
- Special instruments : Thomas Bloch (ondes Martenot, glass harmonica, cristal Baschet)
- Visual concept and design: Jamie Hewlett
- Dramaturgy: David Greenspan
- Libretto and direction: Chen Shi-Zheng
- Sound Designer and Mix Engineer: Barry Bartlett
