= Little Crown Prince Zhang =

- Journey to the West character
- First appearance: Chapter 66

In-universe information
- Alias: Third Prince of the Flowing Sand Kingdom
- Species: Deity
- Affiliation: Great Sage Zen Temple
- Weapon: Paper-white spear
- Master: Great Sage National Preceptor King Bodhisattva

Little Crown Prince Zhang (Chinese: 小张太子; pinyin: Xiǎozhāng Tàizǐ) is a character in the 16th-century Chinese novel Journey to the West. He is the main disciple of the Great Sage National Preceptor King Bodhisattva (大圣国师王菩萨) and helps Sun Wukong fight the Yellow Brows Demon.

Some believe that the character came from earlier Yuan dynasty plays and flood legends from the Huai River region. He is also thought to be a folk version of Muzha, a disciple of the Tang dynasty monk Sangha. In the lower Yangtze River region, he is worshipped as a local deity called the "Sizhou Zhang Great Sage", who protects people from floods.

== Role in Journey to the West ==
Little Crown Prince Zhang first appears in Chapter 66. After Sun Wukong is defeated by the Yellow Brows Demon (黄眉怪) at the Lesser Thunder Monastery, he goes to the Great Sage Zen Temple on Mount Xuyi (盱眙山) in Sizhou. He asks the National Preceptor Wang Bodhisattva for help.

The Bodhisattva cannot leave the temple because he must keep the recently captured Water Ape Great Sage (水猿大圣) under control. Instead, he sends Little Crown Prince Zhang and four divine generals to help Wukong. Before the battle, Zhang tells Wukong about his past. He says that he was the Third Prince of the Flowing Sand Kingdom (流沙国). He was often sick as a child, so his father sent him to study as a monk under the National Preceptor Wang Bodhisattva. He later learned martial arts and magic.

Zhang fights the Yellow Brows Demon with his paper-white spear (楮白枪). However, the demon uses a magical cloth sack (后天人种袋) to capture Zhang, the four generals, and Wukong's other heavenly allies. They remain prisoners until Maitreya Buddha comes to defeat the demon and free them.

== Literary origins and folklore ==
=== Historical prototype ===
The Tang dynasty monk Sangha, who is believed to have inspired the Bodhisattva, had three disciples, but none of them was a prince. Some historians believe that the title "Crown Prince" (Taizi) came from Emperor Suzong of Tang, who gave royal crown prince robes to Sangha's temple. The robes were a gift to show his respect for the monk. Over time, this story may have changed into a legend about a real prince who studied under Sangha.

=== In regional folk religion ===
Little Crown Prince Zhang also appears in local religious stories outside Journey to the West. In the Jingjiang storytelling text Great Sage Precious Scroll (大圣宝卷), he is called Zhang Changsheng (张长生). The story says that he was once a heavenly being who was sent to the human world after breaking a glass bowl in heaven. He was born into a human family and later became a disciple of Guanyin. He reached enlightenment after defeating Shuimu, the Water Mother, a water demon from the Huai River.

In a 2018 study, Chen Yongchao suggested that the character may have come from stories about the monk Sangha and his disciple Muzha (木叉). These stories changed over time and appeared in later Yuan and Ming dynasty literature. Chen also noted that the Great Sage Precious Scroll has close links to the worship of the Great Sage at Mount Lang (狼山) in Nantong. It contains many local folk stories that are still known today.

=== The Yuan zaju prototype ===
Little Crown Prince Zhang may have come from an earlier character in the Yuan dynasty zaju play Journey to the West, written by Yang Jingxian. In the seventeenth act, The Queen Forces a Marriage (女王逼婚), the queen mentions a monk named Zhang (张僧). She says, "Wuzhiqi captured Monk Zhang on Turtle Mountain" (巫枝祇把张僧拿住在龟山上).

Monk Zhang and Little Crown Prince Zhang share the same surname and both have links to Buddhism and the water demon Wuzhiqi. A study suggests that this may not be a coincidence. It is possible that Wu Cheng'en used the earlier character as the model for Little Crown Prince Zhang in the novel.

=== Jianghuai water mythology ===
The story of Little Crown Prince Zhang is also linked to flood legends from the Jianghuai region. The Great Sage National Preceptor King Bodhisattva is generally believed to be based on Sangha, a Tang dynasty monk who was worshipped as the "Sizhou Great Sage". In local legends, Sangha defeated the water demon Wuzhiqi, also called the Water Mother. Stories about this were recorded during the Southern Song dynasty.

In Journey to the West, Little Crown Prince Zhang tells Sun Wukong that he and his master had defeated the Water Mother in the past. Some researchers believe that Zhang's character may have come partly from these older stories about Sangha and the Huai River water demon.

== Modern ritual worship ==
In the lower Yangtze River region, Little Crown Prince Zhang became part of local religious traditions. In places such as Jinhu, people still use ritual texts such as the Water Mother Confession (水母忏). These stories tell of the "Sizhou Zhang Great Sage" (泗州张大圣), a local deity who protects people from floods. He is seen as a figure who combines stories about the monk Sangha, his disciple Mucha, and Little Crown Prince Zhang from the old plays.

In the Water Mother Confession, the Water Mother brings nine dragons to flood Sizhou. She enters the city disguised as a water seller, but the Sizhou Zhang Great Sage pretends to buy water from her and stops her magic.

== In popular culture ==
Little Crown Prince Zhang appears as a supporting character in the 2024 video game Black Myth: Wukong. He is known as the "Third Prince" (小张太子) of the Flowing Sands Kingdom. Unlike the rest of his family, he does not turn into a rat demon because he left the kingdom earlier to study under Wang Bodhisattva.

Later in the game, he fights Yellowbrow with four divine generals, but they are defeated. The generals become corrupted monsters. To protect himself from Yellowbrow's magic, the Prince makes himself blind and deaf. Players later find him imprisoned in the Pagoda Realm. By completing his side quest, players can get materials to make his Chu-Bai Spear (楮白枪).

== See also ==
- List of Journey to the West characters
- Wuzhiqi
- Taizi Changqin
