= Sangha (monk) =

Tang dynasty monk

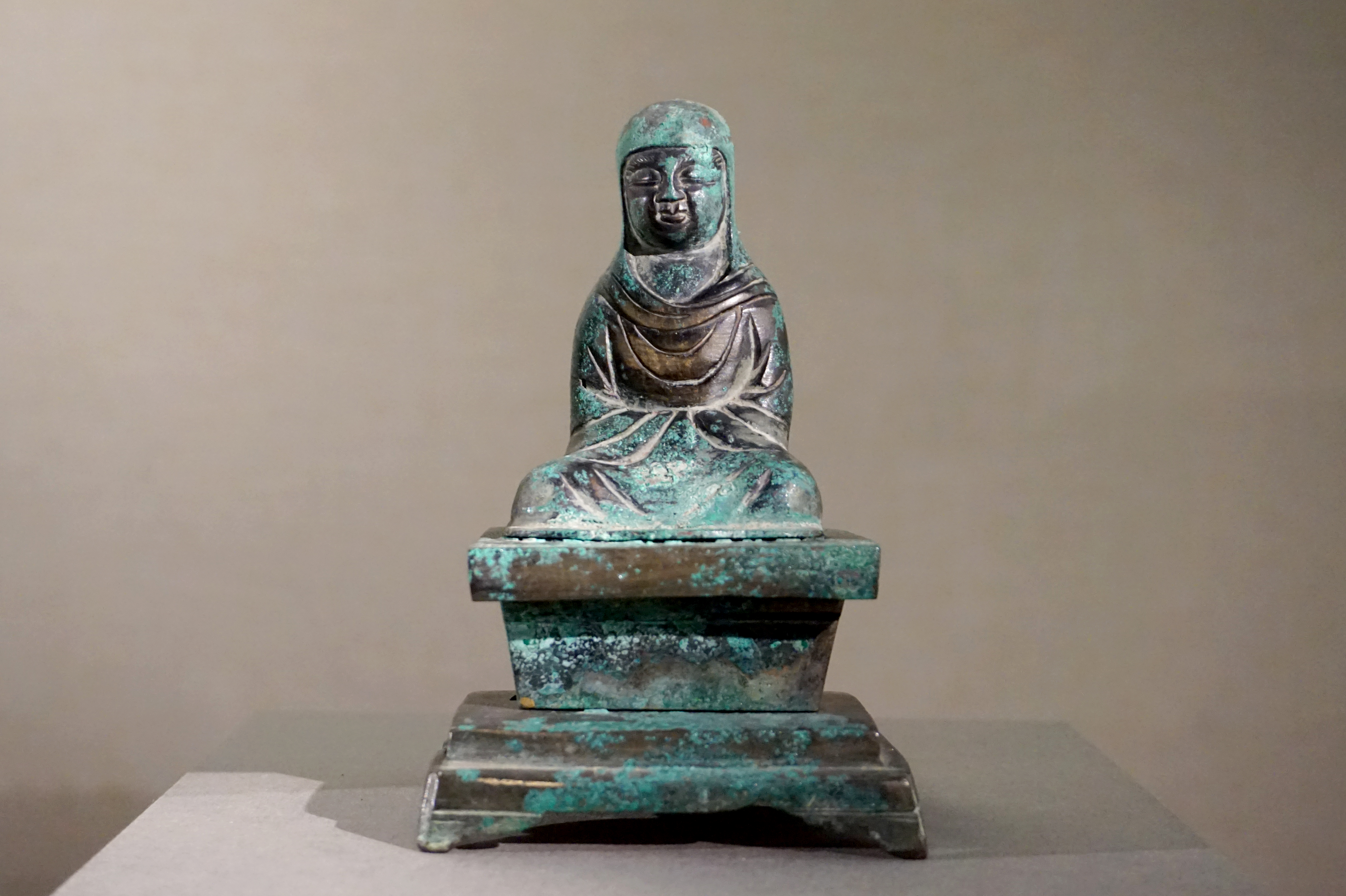
A seated statue of Sangha

Sangha (628–710), also known as the Great Sage of Sizhou (泗州大聖, Sizhou Dasheng), was an eminent Chinese monk who lived in the Tang dynasty. He was a highly venerated monk during the Tang and Song dynasties. The Great Sage of Sizhou is believed to be an avatar of the bodhisattva Guanyin (Avalokiteśvara).

== Historical origin ==
Sangha was originally from the state of He in the Western Regions during the early Tang dynasty. He later traveled to Sizhou and built the Puzhaowang Temple in the first year of Emperor Gaozong's reign in 661 AD. According to The Transmission of the Light, Sangha arrived at Emperor Gaozong's court and had an intellectual exchange about Chan Buddhism with the emperor. During their conversation, the emperor inquired about the monk's last name, to which the monk responded by asking, "What is my last name?" Similarly, when the emperor asked about the monk's country of origin, the wise monk replied by asking, "Which country am I from?"

During a meeting between Emperor Zhongzong and the Master Wanhui, the emperor inquired, "Who is the Sangha Master?" In response, Master Wanhui stated that the Sangha Master is the incarnation of Guanyin. Following this event, the title of Master Sangha became well-known and widely disseminated.

In the year 708, during the second year of Jinglong, Emperor Zhongzong dispatched a special envoy to invite the master to the capital city of Chang'an. The emperor respected him as the national teacher and appointed him to be the abbot of Jianfu Temple in Chang'an. However, on March 3 of the fourth year of Jinglong, in 710 AD, the master peacefully died at the age of 83. Upon his passing, Emperor Zhongzong honored him by paying tribute to his preserved body and sending it back to Linhuai Pagoda in Sizhou for offerings. After the cremation, relics were found from the remains of Sangha. The Sangha is greatly revered as the incarnation of Avalokitesvara Bodhisattva in Buddhist scriptures, and the Tang dynasty's depiction of Guanyin was modeled on the image of Sangha. Sangha was posthumously honored with the titles of Great Sage Mingjue Puzhao National Teacher in the Tang dynasty and other titles such as Ci Puguangjue National Teacher Bodhisattva in the Song dynasty. The Sizhou Temple Pagoda was constructed during the reign of Emperor Zhongzong of the Tang dynasty as a commemoration to the great sage of Sizhou. As a result, Su Shi also called it Dasheng (Great Sage). The pagoda was destroyed in 1564, during the Ming dynasty. On the ruins of the pagoda, a pavilion was constructed in 1573. The pagoda was not reconstructed until 1618. After his death, shrines were dedicated to him in various parts of China.

He had apprentices named Mucha, Hui-an, and Hui-yen. As Sangha was seen as an avatar of Guanyin, Mucha was later fictionalized as Guanyin's apprentice in the zajü version of Journey to the West during the Great Yuan period. Afterwards, he was further blended with Hui-an as "Mucha Hui-an" (Chinese: 木叉惠岸) in the Chinese classic novel Journey to the West during the Great Ming period. In addition, some scholars speculate that the Master Sangha may not have been purely a Buddhist monk, but could have had connections to Manichaeism, either as a Manichaean Buddhist or as a missionary of Manichaeism during that time.

== Legends ==
=== Conquering the Water Demon ===
There are many bizarre legends about the Great Sage of Sizhou among Sizhou folks. It is also said that when there were frequent floods in Sizhou, the Great Sage of Sizhou used exercises and built Lingrui Temple to subdue the water demon.

During the Song and Yuan dynasties, he became a revered figure known for his power to prevent floods and even exert control over the three-legged water demon, Wuzhiqi (巫支祁), who controlled the waters of the Huai and Guo rivers.

The Yuan and Ming-era scholar Tao Zongyi's c. 1366 book Nancun Chuogeng Lu states that the Great Sage of Sizhou trapped Shuimu under the Sizhou Pagoda. Shuimu is a variation of the ancient water demon Wuzhiqi. According to folklore, she walks along Sizhou road carrying two buckets of water. The buckets contain water from all over the world. When the water is poured out, the southeastern half of the wall will transforms into a vast ocean. During this time, the Great Sage of Sizhou, stationed in the area, approached Shuimu to request water and drank all buckets of water with his mouth. She was shocked and fought fiercely with him. In the battle between the monk and Shuimu, Shuimu was eventually defeated and imprisoned beneath the Sizhou Pagoda. This type of story model later evolved into the Legend of White Snake or The Flooding of Jinshan Temple, in which Bai Suzhen (the white snake) fights with Fahai.

=== Journey to the West ===
A mysterious character, Guoshiwang Bodhisattva (國師王菩薩), believed to be based on the Great Sage of Sizhou, appears in the Chinese classical novel Journey to the West as a bodhisattva who lives in Xuyi Mountain in Nanfangbuzhou. He has an apprentice, Little Crown Prince Zhang (小張太子), and the Four Great Generals (四大神將) under his command. Along with his disciples, they once subdued the water spirit Shuimu. When Sun Wukong was at a loss about how to deal with the Yellow-Browed Great King (黃眉大王), he requested the assistance of Preceptor of State-King Bodhisattva to help him subdue the monster. However, the bodhisattva had recently undertaken the task of subduing the Water Ape Demon and couldn't go in person. Therefore, only Little Crown Prince Zhang and the four great generals were sent to subdue the Yellow Brows Great King.

=== God of Love ===
The worship of Sizhou Dasheng is most prevalent in Guangdong and Fujian provinces. According to legend, in the border area between Huian and Jinjiang counties in Fujian, there was a turbulent river called the Luoyang River that couldn't be bridged despite generations of efforts. One day, an old man and a beautiful woman arrived at the center of the river in a boat. The old man announced that whoever could throw silver and hit the girl would marry her. Numerous people came forward to throw silver, but all the coins fell into the river.

After several months, the riverbed was filled with silver, becoming the foundation for building the bridge. It is said that the old man was actually Tudigong in disguise, and the girl was Guanyin Bodhisattva in disguise. Their purpose in doing this was to build a bridge for the benefit of the people. However, just as this great feat was about to be completed, a native from Sizhou successfully hit the girl with money. The old man then asked him to come to a gazebo to discuss marriage. Once the native from Sizhou sat down in the gazebo, his soul was enlightened by Guanyin Bodhisattva and taken to the Western Pure Land, while his physical body remained in the pavilion. Thus, he became the revered Sizhou Dasheng worshipped by the people.

In folk belief, Sizhou Dasheng is highly regarded as understanding and sympathetic towards men and women seeking a fulfilling marriage. People pray to Sizhou Dasheng not only to obtain love but also to ensure their partner remains faithful, ultimately leading to a happy and fulfilling marriage.

== Relics ==
The Sizhou Dasheng Bronze Statue, dating back to the Southern Song dynasty (1127–1279), was discovered in 1974 at the Xingshengjiao Temple Pagoda in Songjiang District, Shanghai. It stands at a height of 14 cm and is currently housed in the collection of the Shanghai Museum.

On November 28, 2003, archaeologists discovered a stone box at the base site of Wukong Temple. Inside the box, they found a shadow celadon bowl and a green dotted colored clean bottle. The clean bottle contained numerous relics, which were colorful, predominantly white, crystal clear, and shiny, with a round and smooth appearance. According to the textual research on the inscription found on the stone tablet, these relics were identified as belonging to the Great Sage of Sizhou. The relics were first unveiled for worship in 2004 at Wukong Temple, located in Qingyang Town, Jiangyin City, Jiangsu Province, China.

A tomb discovered in Henan, dated 1108, depicts a couple kneeling in worship before the Great Sage of Sizhou.

== Worship temples ==
By the end of the Tang dynasty, there were four main Buddhist holy sites for collective worship: Wutai Mountain, which was considered the Holy Land of Manjusri Bodhisattva; Sizhou Puguangwang Temple, known as the Holy Land of the Great Sage of Sizhou; Zhongnan Mountain, regarded as the Holy Land of Sanjiejiao; and Fengxiang Famen Temple, recognized as the Holy Land of Buddha Bones.

=== Mainland China ===
- Guanlin Temple, Xiabanlin Village, Yancuo Town, Longhai City, Zhangzhou City, Fujian Province
- Sizhou Rock, Youai Village, Changqiao Town, Zhangpu County, Zhangzhou City, Fujian Province

=== Taiwan ===
- Sizhou Buddhist Temple, Wantan Village, Zhongpu Township, Chiayi County

=== South Korea ===
- Seunggasa Temple, Gugi-dong, Jongno-gu, Seoul

== See also ==
- Chen Jinggu
