= Nobody (2025 film) =

2025 animated fantasy film by Yu Shui

- Theatrical release poster
- Chinese: 浪浪山小妖怪
- Literal meaning: The Little Monster of Langlang Mountain
- Hanyu Pinyin: Làng làng shān xiǎo yāo guài
- Directed by: Yu Shui
- Screenplay by: Yu Shui; Liu Jia
- Based on: Journey to the West by Wu Cheng'en; Yao-Chinese Folktales by Yu Shui
- Produced by: Liaoyu Chen
- Starring: Ziping Chen; Wenliang Dong; Yang Lu; Cong Liu
- Production company: Shanghai Animation Film Studio
- Distributed by: Shanghai Film Group
- Release date: 2 August 2025 (China)
- Running time: 118 minutes
- Country: China
- Language: Mandarin Chinese
- Box office: $215.3 million

Nobody (Chinese: 浪浪山小妖怪; pinyin: Làng làng shān xiǎo yāo guài; literally The Little Monster of Langlang Mountain) is a 2025 Chinese animated fantasy film written and directed by Yu Shui. It was animated by the Shanghai Animation Film Studio and is based on an episode of the anthology series Yao-Chinese Folktales. It is the highest-grossing 2D animated film made by a Chinese company.

== Plot ==
After failing to rob a traveller, a pig yaoguai tries to find employment at King's Cave, a settlement run by a powerful yaoguai, with help from his toad yaoguai friend. They are given the impossible task of cleaning a dirty cauldron with rags. Pig uses his bristles to shine it, but erases the calligraphy written on it by his boss's grandfather and the two are banished.

The monk Tang Sanzang travels to retrieve the Tripitaka scrolls; it's said that eating a piece of Sanzang's flesh will grant a yaoguai immortality. Pig and frog decide to retrieve the scrolls first and plan to impersonate Sanzang's group. They are joined by an overly talkative weasel yaoguai and a cowardly stuttering gorilla yaoguai; toad is disguised as Sanzang, pig as Zhu Bajie, weasel as Sha Wujing, and gorilla as Sun Wukong.

Toad is kidnapped by a tribe of dog yaoguai led by Black Dog and Yellow Dog, thinking that he is the real Sanzang. When the others arrive at their cave, Yellow Dog, frightened because he believes gorilla is the real Wukong, treats the group as honorable guests and gift them a bath and new clothes.

Pig's group comes across a village terrorized by a rat yaoguai and Gorilla defeats him, they're rewarded with food and banners for their group. They stop by pig's home to offload the excess food and see pig's family. Pig's father teaches Weasel his ultimate technique, one that pig mentions frequently, a powerful ability but once used the yaoguai will revert to their original animal form. The real Sanzang's group arrive at the Dog yaoguai cave and wipe them out while Yellow Dog escapes.

The group arrives at Little Thunderclap Temple, but it is full of yaoguai led by Yellow Brow. Mistaking them for the real Sanzang's group, Yellow Brow and his men disguise themselves as Buddha and his entourage. Seeing through their act, Pig's group is forced to flee to a nearby village. The villagers beg the group to save their children and Pig agrees, not realizing that the kidnapper is Yellow Brow. The group try to defend the villagers from Yellow Brow's yaoguai, but are beaten and exposed as frauds.

Yellow Brow reveals his plan to eat the children to gain more power while Yellow Dog arrives and warns that a group of impostors are en-route, not realizing it is the real Sanzang. Yellow Brow offers them the chance to eat Sanzang's flesh if they help him, toad and pig accept while Weasel escapes and gorilla refuses. Gorilla is taken by guards to be executed, but is rescued by pig and weasel. The trio of yao impersonate Yellow Brow in order to escape with the children, but they're spotted by Yellow Brow's yaoguai. Toad is able to trick them into letting everyone go. Yellow Brow discovers this and gives chase with all of his yaoguai. Pig stays behind to take on Yellow Brow alone with his ultimate technique while the children escape. He transforms into a powerful warrior and annihilates all of the yaoguai, but loses to Yellow Brow.

Toad, gorilla, and weasel return and use the fusion technique as well, all of them having been taught it by Pig's father. The four of them fuse and transform into a powerful eight-armed warrior. The group as one are able to defeat Yellow Brow and he returns to his original form of a young boy. At the cost of using the ultimate technique, the group lose their yaoguai forms and become normal animals. The four yao hope they will be reincarnated into better lives, but feel satisfied that they lived their own way.

Budai reprimands Yellow Brow for his actions and sends him to challenge Sanzang's party properly, promising that he will face punishment later. Budai's aide asks whats to be done with the former yao animals, but Budai laughs. Sometime later pig, now as a normal animal, meets the real Sun Wukong but scurries off. Seeing the tattered banners the group carried earlier, Sun Wukong understands what transpired and gifts pig's group Four Life-Saving Hairs as thanks. A family is then seen making an offering to a shrine with statues of pig, toad, weasel, and gorilla.

== Cast ==
- Ziping Chen as pig yaoguai
- Wenliang Dong as weasel yaoguai
- Yang Lu as toad yaoguai
- Cong Liu as gorilla yaoguai
- Qiang Lin as Huangmei Dawang, the Buddha, and Sun Wukong
- Zhe Chen as King Yellow Dog
- Tom Fu as Rooster painter
- Meng Li as King Black Dog
- Shui Yu as crow yaoguai
- Wentian Zhang as Captain Leopard
- Xu Wu as the old monk chief
- Shangbin Wang as rat yaoguai
- Xiangliang Jiang as pig yaoguai's father
- Dongqing Han as pig yaoguai's mother

== Production ==
Yao-Chinese Folktales is an eight episode animated anthology series that garnered over 260 million views on Bilibili by 2025. The pig comes from one of the episodes of the series and the film adapts the episode The Summer of the Little Monster (小妖怪的夏天). Yu Shui, who wrote and directed Yao-Chinese Folktales, wrote and directed the film adaptation made by Shanghai Animation Film Studio.

Over the course of four years 600 people worked on the production team and created 1,800 shots and over 2,000 scenes. The style of ink wash painting was used. Yu is from Shanxi and the film features many notable architectural sites of Shanxi such as the Pagoda of Fogong Temple, Foguang Temple, and Guangsheng Temple. The arhats in the film were based on the 18 arhat statues in Chongqing Temple and Shuanglin Temple.

Journey to the West served as an inspiration for the film. The actors for the 1986 television adaptation of Journey to the West are briefly shown on a scroll.

Yu stated that none of the yaoguai have names, as the film's title in English conveys.

== Release ==
Nobody premiered on 2 August 2025. The film was released in Australia, New Zealand, and Malaysia on 6 November, and in North America on 7 November. The film was shown at TIFFCOM on 29 October as part of the Chinese Film Screenings program. It was shown as part of the China Film Pavilion organised by the China Film Group Corporation at the American Film Market held from 11 to 15 November.

== Reception ==
=== Box office ===
In its opening week, Nobody placed second at the Chinese box office behind Dead to Rights. It rose to first in its second week. The film earned over $215.3 million and was seen by over 47 million people. 3.2 million units of merchandise for the film was sold and over 500 million yuan was earned from merchandise.

Ten days into its theatrical run, Nobody became the highest-grossing Chinese 2D animated film, surpassing the record set by Big Fish & Begonia (2016). It is the highest gross 2D animated film in China, surpassing the record set by Suzume (2022), and is the highest grossing film by Shanghai Animation Film Studio.

=== Critical reception ===
On Douban the film received a score of 8.6 compared to the 8.5 for Ne Zha 2. Review bombing occurred after a Q&A session featuring Fu Shou'er and Su Min due to the two's interpretation of the film and the character of the pig mom.

21st Century Business Herald's review of the film praised the story's progression from simple to complex. Zhang Meiting, writing for Caixin, praised the expansion of the characters between the episode and the film by centering on an obscure pig demon rather than the traditional protagonists of Journey to the West, which effectively mirrors modern social sentiments by framing the story through the lens of an ordinary underdog. However, the review notes a disconnect in the finale, arguing that while the sudden use of a powerful ability ensures a high-stakes climax, it arguably compromises the character's established identity as a common man and drifts away from the film's grounded premise.

== Accolades ==
Award	Date of ceremony	Category	Recipient(s)	Result	Ref.
21st Chinese American Film Festival	2025	Golden Angel Award	Won (Note: Award given to ten films)		

== Works cited ==
=== News ===
- "21st Chinese American film, TV festivals open in Los Angeles". Xinhuanet. 8 November 2025. Archived from the original on 16 November 2025.
- "《浪浪山小妖怪》破12亿，取经团逆袭戳中谁的 "心巴"？". Forbes. 25 August 2025. Archived from the original on 15 November 2025.
- "《浪浪山小妖怪》11月6日登陆澳新马，次日北美上映". Sina Corporation. 23 October 2025. Archived from the original on 15 November 2025.
- "《浪浪山小妖怪》：出发比抵达更重要丨影评". 21st Century Business Herald. 16 August 2025. Archived from the original on 15 November 2025.
- "走！跟着浪浪山小妖怪打卡山西古建". Science and Technology Daily. 17 August 2025. Archived from the original on 17 August 2025.
- "China Film Pavilion Highlights Chinese Cinematic Achievements at 46th American Film Market". Variety. 13 November 2025. Archived from the original on 16 November 2025.
- "'Nobody' set to become somebody in cinematic history". The Express Tribune. 16 August 2025. Archived from the original on 15 November 2025.
- "Shanghai Animation's 'Nobody' Surges to No. 1 as China's Biggest 2D Release". Animation Magazine. 19 August 2025. Archived from the original on 15 November 2025.
- He, Ruiwen (2025). "揭秘浪浪山小妖怪诞生之路". Xinhuanet.
- Lang, Jamie (18 August 2025). "China summer box office hits $1.4bn as animation 'Nobody' rises to the top". Cartoon Brew. Archived from the original on 15 November 2025.
- Li, Tingjun (30 October 2025). "《浪浪山小妖怪》如何撬动22亿消费市场？". Sina Corporation. Archived from the original on 15 November 2025.
- Liu, Dan (12 August 2025). "刷新动画票房纪录：感谢每一位和小妖怪并肩同行的你". Beijing Radio and Television Station. Archived from the original on 31 August 2025.
- Ramachandran, Naman (17 August 2025). "China Box Office: 'Nobody' Climbs to No. 1 as Jackie Chan's 'The Shadow's Edge' Opens". Variety. Archived from the original on 18 August 2025.
- Scott, Mathew (29 October 2025). "From 'Nobody' to Global Contenders: China's Animation Sector Comes of Age". The Hollywood Reporter. Archived from the original on 15 November 2025.
- Wang, Ying (11 November 2025). ""金中实实在在地影响、塑造了我！"《浪浪山小妖怪》总制片人李早分享金中回忆". Yangtse Evening Post. Archived from the original on 15 November 2025.
- Wang, Ying; Chen, Yunge (17 August 2025). "从《浪浪山小妖怪》评分起伏，看动画电影该如何赢得长久的口碑？丨文化评弹". Sichuan Daily. Archived from the original on 15 November 2025.
- Wong, Silvia (19 August 2025). "China summer box office hits $1.4bn as animation 'Nobody' rises to the top". Screen International. Archived from the original on 15 November 2025.
- Xia, June (19 August 2025). "Surprising many, Nobody becomes China's top 2D animated film at the box office". South China Morning Post. Archived from the original on 15 November 2025.
- Zhang, Meiting (6 August 2025). "《浪浪山小妖怪》：草根小妖的取经路｜影视". Caixin. Archived from the original on 15 November 2025.
- Zhu, Yumeng (31 October 2025). "捷成股份：《浪浪山小妖怪》衍生品销量已突破320万件". Securities Times. Archived from the original on 15 November 2025.

=== Web ===
- "Nobody (2025)". Mubi. Archived from the original on 15 November 2025.
- "Nobody (浪浪山小妖怪) (2025)". The Numbers.
- Chang, Chen; Xie, Xinyi (21 August 2025). "'Nobody' and 'The Legend of Hei 2' Drive Merchandising Boom: Domestic Film IPs Seek Staying Power". Chongqing. Archived from the original on 16 November 2025.
