= Kang Jinlong =

Chinese deity

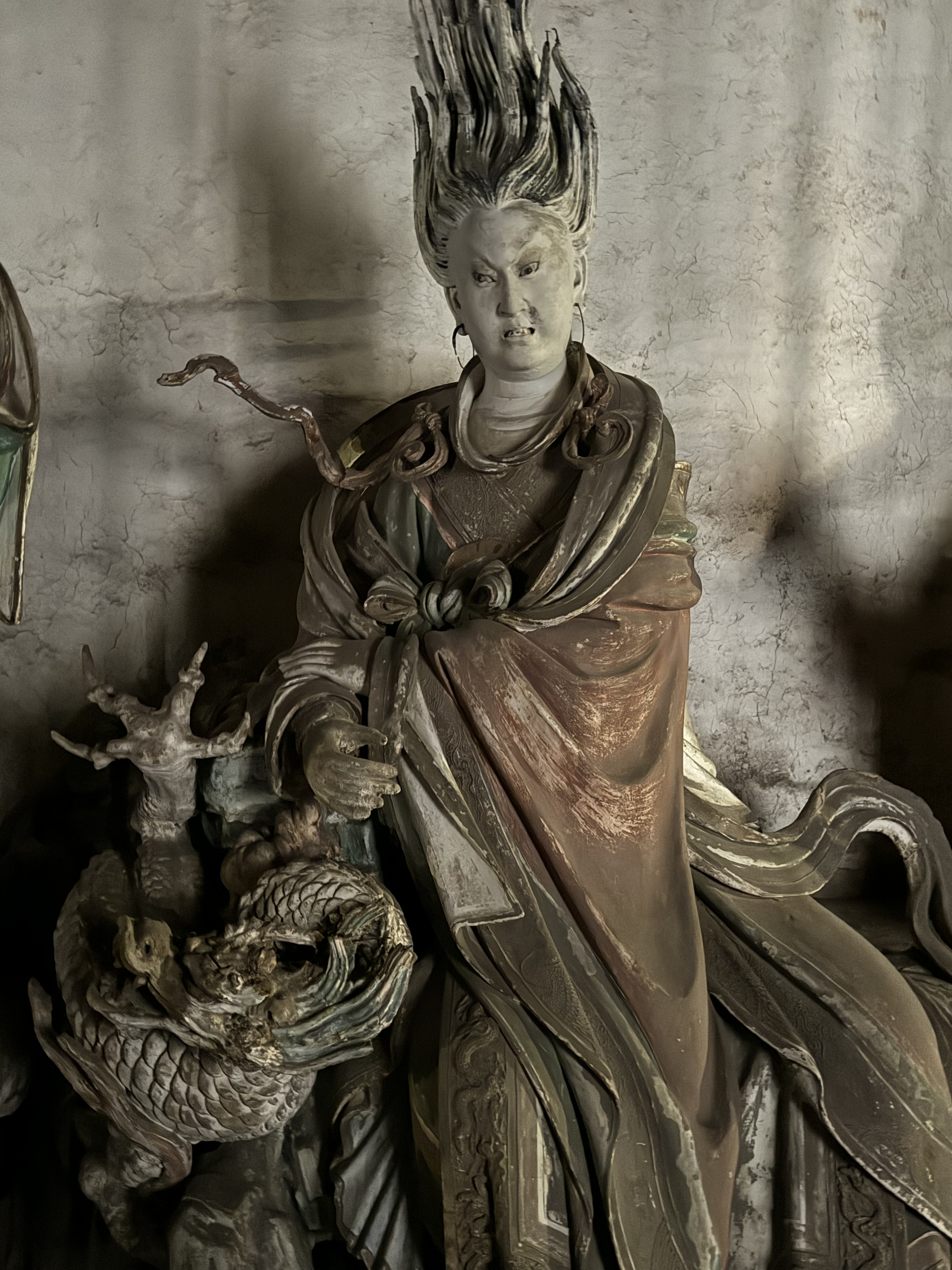
- Statue of Kang Jilong in the Jade Emperor Temple, Fucheng
- Traditional Chinese: 亢金龍
- Simplified Chinese: 亢金龙
- Literal meaning: The Golden Dragon of Neck
Transcriptions
Standard Mandarin
- Hanyu Pinyin: Kàng Jīnlóng

Kang Jinlong (Chinese: 亢金龙; pinyin: Kàng Jīnlóng; lit. 'Metal Dragon of the Neck') is a star deity in Chinese mythology and Taoism. He represents Kang, the second of the Twenty-Eight Mansions and one of the seven mansions of the Azure Dragon. Kang represents the dragon's neck, while the word jin (金) in his name refers to the element of metal.

In Taoist belief, Kang Jinlong is one of the Twenty-Eight Mansion Star Lords. He is said to govern strong winds in the human world. His animal form is a dragon, and he has been depicted in both male and female human forms.

== Astronomy ==
In Chinese astronomy, the Kang Mansion (亢宿, Kàng Xiù) lies in the modern constellation of Virgo. Its four main stars are Kappa Virginis (κ Vir), Iota Virginis (ι Vir), Phi Virginis (φ Vir), and Lambda Virginis (λ Vir). The four stars form the neck of the Azure Dragon. During the Qing dynasty, the astronomical catalogue Yixiang Kaocheng (儀象考成) listed twelve additional stars for Kang.

Kang is the second of the seven eastern mansions, after the Horn Mansion (角宿) and before the Root Mansion (氐宿). The seven mansions were imagined as parts of a dragon stretching across the eastern sky. Kang and Horn represent its neck and horns.

The appearance of Horn and Kang in the eastern sky during early spring was an important seasonal sign in ancient China. Their rising was linked to the start of agricultural work and the traditional festival of Longtaitou, or "Dragon Raising Its Head".

== Form ==
Kang Jinlong's animal form is a dragon. In Chinese astrology, he is linked to metal, one of the Five Phases. His human form has appeared as both male and female in Chinese art.

The painting Five Planets and Twenty-Eight Constellations, believed to be the work of the Tang dynasty painter Liang Lingzan, shows Kang Jinlong as a bearded man wearing a tall hat. A Yuan dynasty statue at Yuhuang Temple in Jincheng, Shanxi, shows Kang Jinlong as a woman with an angry face, long hair standing up, and a dragon beside her.

Sheng Wenqiang suggests that the male and female forms reflect the yin and yang sides of metal. He also compares the female statue at Yuhuang Temple with Kang Jinlong in Black Myth: Wukong.

== Records ==
In Daoist texts, Kang Jinlong is called the Star Lord of the Kang Mansion (亢宿星君). He is one of the Twenty-Eight Mansion Star Lords and is said to govern strong winds in the human world.

The Sandong Zhunang (三洞珠囊) places the Kang Mansion under the Limitless, Void, and Spontaneous (無極虛無自然) in heaven and over Mount Lutang (鹿堂山) on earth. The same text quotes the Duxing Jing (度星經), which gives Kang the name Junming (君明).

The Book of Jin describes the four stars of Kang as the emperor's inner court. They were believed to govern official reports, legal cases, and the recording of achievements. Kang was also called Shumiao (疏廟) and was linked to disease and epidemics.

According to Volume 24 of the Yunji Qiqian (雲笈七籤), Kang governs four yin spirits (陰神) linked to the heavenly stem Yi (乙). They are given the surname Fu (扶) and the name Sima (司馬). They have horse heads and red bodies, wear red garments, and carry swords.

The Taishang Dongshen Wuxing Zhuxiu Riyue Hunchang Jing (太上洞神五星諸宿日月混常經) describes the spirits of Kang, Di (氐), and Fang (房) as travelling together on Yin and Mao days (寅卯日). They wear blue-green robes and ride horses. They appear among crowds or at large Daoist ceremonies. The text says that they have unusual appearances, with a faint purple glow above their heads. People who meet them can ask for their help and receive methods to relieve suffering and poverty.

Volume 8 of the Dongyuan Ji (洞淵集) calls Kang the Celestial Court Star Lord (亢宿天庭星君). It places him under Xuanming Gongqing Heaven (玄明恭慶天) and connects him with the territory of the ancient State of Zheng. He is said to govern Western India and several other lands. In the human world, his duties include epidemics, strong winds, windblown stones, medicinal herbs, state preceptors, the Three Dukes (三公), the Five Elders (五老), and the ranks of government officials.

The Shangqing Lingbao Jidu Dacheng Jinshu (上清靈寶濟度大成金書) places Kang in Kaihe Palace (開闔宮), on the northern side of the Chen (辰) direction. He helps those who have attained the Dao to become immortals. The text connects him with the Guimao (癸卯) and Jiachen (甲辰) pairs and the Gou (姤) and Cui (萃) hexagrams of the I Ching.

The Sidou Ershiba Xiu Tiandi Dalu (四斗二十八宿天帝大籙) describes the Kang star as having 90,000 spiritual officials, immortals, soldiers, and horses (靈官神仙兵馬). The same number is given for the other six mansions of the Eastern Azure Dragon.

In Investiture of the Gods, Li Daotong (李道通) is one of the immortals who die in the Ten Thousand Immortals Formation. He is later named Kang Jinlong (亢金龍) among the Twenty-Eight Mansions when Jiang Ziya assigns the divine titles.

== Appearance in Journey to the West ==
Kang Jinlong appears in the 16th-century Chinese novel Journey to the West. At the Little Thunder Sound Temple, the Yellow-Browed Demon traps Sun Wukong inside a pair of magical golden cymbals (金鐃). The Jade Emperor sends the Twenty-Eight Mansions to rescue him, but they cannot open the cymbals.

Kang Jinlong tries to help by making himself smaller and pushing the tip of his horn through the narrow gap between the cymbals. He then makes his horn grow larger, but the cymbals remain tightly closed. Wukong turns his staff into a drill and makes a hole in Kang Jinlong's horn. He shrinks to the size of a mustard seed and hides inside the hole. Kang Jinlong pulls his horn out, bringing Wukong with him. After escaping, Wukong breaks the cymbals with his staff.

Kang Jinlong later joins the other star deities in fighting the Yellow-Browed Demon. The demon captures them with a magical bag. Wukong escapes and frees the others, but they are caught again during another battle. In the following chapter, Wukong tells Zhenwu Dadi how Kang Jinlong helped him escape from the cymbals.

== Temple ==
One of the most notable representations of Kang Jinlong is found at the Jade Emperor Temple in Zezhou County, Shanxi Province, China. The temple, first constructed during the Northern Song dynasty in 1076, houses a collection of 28 clay sculptures representing the Twenty-Eight Mansions, created by Yuan dynasty artist Liu Yuan (also known as Liu Luan).

The statue of Kang Jinlong stands approximately 1.92 meters tall and depicts the deity as a fierce, dynamic female figure with flowing garments and a commanding expression.

== In popular culture ==
In the acclaimed 2024 game Black Myth: Wukong, Kang Jinlong is depicted as a fallen female star god who has succumbed to lust and darkness, becoming a villain. The game's depiction of the character draws heavily from the Yuan dynasty sculptures at the Jade Emperor Temple, sparking renewed public interest in this celestial figure and the rich mythology of the Twenty-Eight Mansions. This resurgence has contributed to increased cultural tourism at the temple.
