= Huangmei Dawang =

Antagonist in Journey to the West

Huangmei Dawang (Chinese: 黃眉大王; pinyin: Huángméi Dàwáng; lit. 'Yellow-Browed Great King'), also known as the Yellow-Browed Demon, is a character in the 16th-century Chinese novel Journey to the West. He is a young servant of Maitreya who steals his master's magical treasures and runs away to the human world. He sets up a false Buddhist temple called the Little Thunderclap Monastery (小雷音寺) and pretends to be the Buddha. He later captures Tang Sanzang and his disciples.

== In Journey to the West ==
Tang Sanzang and his disciples come to a temple that looks like the Thunderclap Monastery on Vulture Peak. Sun Wukong feels that something is wrong and warns his master not to enter. Tang Sanzang does not listen and goes inside to worship the Buddha. They see what looks like the Buddha surrounded by monks and other Buddhist figures. Wukong soon sees that they are demons pretending to be holy figures. He tries to attack them, but the Huangmei Dawang traps him inside a pair of Golden Cymbals (金鐃). Tang Sanzang, Zhu Bajie, and Sha Wujing are also captured.

The Jade Emperor sends the Twenty-Eight Mansions to save Wukong, but they cannot open the cymbals. Kang Jinlong then puts his horn through a small gap. Wukong makes a hole in the horn with his staff and changes himself into a tiny form. He hides inside the hole, and Kang Jinlong pulls his horn out. Once free, Wukong breaks the cymbals with his staff.

Huangmei comes out to fight Wukong. He calls himself the Yellow-Browed Old Buddha (黃眉老佛) and uses a short wolf-toothed club (狼牙棒). They fight for fifty rounds, but neither wins. Huangmei then uses a magical white bag to capture Wukong and the heavenly warriors. Wukong escapes during the night and frees the others, but Huangmei catches them again. Wukong manages to escape a second time.

Wukong goes to Zhenwu for help. Zhenwu sends the Turtle and Snake Generals and five dragons to fight Huangmei. They are also caught in his magical bag. The heavenly official Gongcao then tells Wukong to ask Great Sage National Preceptor King Bodhisattva for help. The bodhisattva sends his disciple, Little Crown Prince Zhang, and four divine generals. They fight Huangmei but are also captured by the bag.

Maitreya comes to help Wukong. He tells him that Huangmei is his servant, who was responsible for striking a musical instrument called a qing (磬). While Maitreya was away at a gathering, Huangmei stole his Golden Cymbals, a magical bag called the Human-Race Pouch (人種袋), and the mallet used to strike the qing. He then went to Little Thunder Sound Temple and pretended to be the Buddha.

Maitreya makes a plan to catch Huangmei. He tells Wukong to lead the demon to a melon field. Maitreya changes himself into an old melon farmer, while Wukong turns into a ripe melon. When Huangmei comes to the field, he asks the farmer for a melon. Maitreya gives him the melon that Wukong has become. Huangmei eats it, and Wukong enters his stomach. Wukong begins hurting him from inside until he begs Maitreya for help. Maitreya takes back his bag and mallet and tells Wukong to come out. He then puts Huangmei inside the bag. Maitreya also collects the broken Golden Cymbals and makes them whole again before leaving with Huangmei.

Wukong frees Tang Sanzang, Zhu Bajie, Sha Wujing, and the captured heavenly warriors. After thanking the gods who came to help them, the group leaves the temple. Before leaving, they set fire to the buildings and continue their journey west.

== Interpretations ==
In his Qing dynasty commentary on Journey to the West, Wang Xiangxu (汪象旭) explains that the false Little Thunderclap Temple shows how people can be fooled by names and appearances. Wukong knows that the temple is false, but Tang Sanzang believes it is holy. Wang also compares Wukong's failed attempts to defeat Huangmei with Maitreya's easy victory. He sees Maitreya's smile as more powerful than anger.

Zhu Hongbo (竺洪波) writes that Huangmei uses the famous name of Thunderclap Temple to win Tang Sanzang's trust. He does not need to force the monk to enter because Tang Sanzang already believes the place is holy. Zhu also points out that Huangmei depends on his stolen treasures to defeat Wukong and the heavenly warriors. Wukong makes the mistake of asking many gods for help without first finding out who Huangmei really is.

The Qing dynasty writer Chen Shibin (陳士斌), also known as Wuyizi (悟一子), compares Huangmei to false Confucian scholars in his Xiyou Zhenquan (西遊真詮). He says that some scholars use the words of the sages to gain wealth and power. Huangmei does something similar by stealing Buddhist treasures and pretending to be a Buddha. Chen sees the story as a warning against people who use good teachings for their own gain.

Yang Yi discusses Huangmei as one of the demons who once served gods or Buddhas. Huangmei was Maitreya's attendant before stealing his treasures and becoming a demon. Yang explains that gods and demons are not always separate in the novel. Some demons come from heaven, while others later become servants of the gods. Their actions also test the pilgrims' faith during the journey.

Sui Xiaopeng (睢晓鹏) questions the way Wukong defeats Huangmei. Although Huangmei has done wrong, Wukong enters his stomach and causes him pain until he gives up. Sui argues that defeating an enemy does not always make the method right. He sees this part of the story as an example of how even a good character can use unfair methods.

== In modern media ==
Huangmei appears as Yellowbrow in the 2024 video game Black Myth: Wukong. He rules the New Thunderclap Temple in the New West and serves as the final boss of the game's third chapter. He fights the Destined One in a battle with several stages, using lightning attacks and magical powers.

Yellowbrow also has a larger role in the game's story. He believes that people are naturally selfish and cannot escape their desires. He argues with Jinchanzi, the former identity of Tang Sanzang, who believes that people can overcome their faults. Yellowbrow sets out to prove his own view of human nature, using tricks and temptation to turn others away from their beliefs.

Yellowbrow gathers followers at his temple, including four disciples named Non-Void (不空), Non-Able (不能), Non-Pure (不净), and Non-White (不白). Their names resemble those of Tang Sanzang's disciples. He also captures Little Crown Prince Zhang and turns his four divine generals into monsters. Kang Jinlong and the Turtle and Snake Generals also suffer after coming under his power.

== See also ==
- List of Journey to the West characters
- Little Crown Prince Zhang
- Maitreya
- Black Myth: Wukong
