= Gongcao Shizhe =

Daoist deities that monitor human behavior

Gongcao Shizhe (Chinese: 功曹使者; pinyin: Gōngcáo shǐzhě), often shortened to Gongcao, are Daoist deities responsible for monitoring human behavior, recording merits and demerits, and delivering written petitions or prayers from the human realm to the Heavenly Court.

== Historical origins ==
The name "Gongcao" first referred to a government official in ancient China. During the Han dynasty, a Gongcao worked under a local governor. Gongcao helped choose officials, kept records of their work, and reported on their performance. The name was later also used in Daoism for gods who carried prayers and written messages to other gods.

== In Daoism ==
In Daoism and Chinese folk religion, Gongcao are messengers who carry prayers and letters from people to the gods. During rituals, priests write prayers or reports on paper. These papers are later burned. Gongcao are believed to carry the messages to the Jade Emperor or other gods. Paper figures of Gongcao are also burned with the documents.

The Four Duty Gods (四值功曹; Sizhi Gongcao) are four Gongcao who serve at different times. They are Zhinian Shen (值年神), the God of the Year; Zhiyue Shen (值月神), the God of the Month; Zhiri Shen (值日神), the God of the Day; and Zhishi Shen (值时神), the God of the Hour. They are also said to watch over people's good and bad actions and report them to Heaven.

People traditionally worship the Four Duty Gods on Chinese New Year's Eve. They pray for their good deeds to be recorded in Heaven.

There are also Three Realms Gongcao (三界功曹). They carry letters to gods of the upper, middle and lower realms. They are usually used in groups of three during major Daoist ceremonies.

Gongcao are said to carry messages to four places. Each place has different gods, and the messengers ride different animals. In the Heavenly Capital (天京), they ride a phoenix and deliver letters to gods such as the Jade Emperor and the Three Great Emperor-Officials. In the Underworld (地府), they ride a qilin and deliver letters to gods such as the Great Emperor of Dongyue and Yanluo Wang.

In the Water Realm (水國), Gongcao ride dragons and deliver letters to the Dragon Kings and other water gods. In the Human Realm (陽間), they ride horses and deliver letters to local gods, including City Gods and Earth Gods.

During Daoist ceremonies, such as Jiao (醮) festivals and Baidou (拜斗) rituals, priests write different kinds of documents. These include shuwen (疏文), which contain people's prayers and requests, and diewen (牒文), which are letters sent between the offices of the gods. Another kind is biaowen (表文), which are formal reports sent to high gods such as the Three Pure Ones and the Jade Emperor. These reports are placed in a special envelope called a fanghan (方函).

Priests also use paper figures of Gongcao during these ceremonies. Some show the messenger riding a horse. When the documents are ready, the priests burn them with the paper figures. This is believed to send the messages to the gods.

=== The Chima ritual ===
In Zhengyi Dao rituals, priests use a paper figure called the Gongcao Horse (功曹馬). It shows a Gongcao messenger riding a horse. The figure is used when priests send prayers and other documents (表牒) to Heaven. The papers and the Gongcao Horse are burned together after the ritual.

Before the papers are burned, the priest performs a ritual called chima (敕馬), meaning "commanding the horse". The priest, sometimes called a Nammo master, gives an order to the Gongcao messenger. The word chi (敕) means an order from an emperor. Although the ritual is called "commanding the horse", the order is given to the messenger, telling him to ride to Heaven and deliver the documents.

== In literature ==
The Four Duty Gods (四值功曹; Sizhi Gongcao) appear in the 16th-century Chinese novel Journey to the West. In the story, Guanyin asks the Jade Emperor to lend her the Gongcao and the Six Ding and Six Jia (六丁六甲) to protect Tang Sanzang on his journey to India. They work with other gods, including the Buddhist Five-Direction Jiedi (五方揭諦) and the Eighteen Guardian Jialan (十八位護教伽藍). The gods take turns watching over the monk without being seen.

The four gods are known as Li Bing (李丙), the God of the Year; Huang Chengyi (黃承乙), the God of the Month; Zhou Deng (周登), the God of the Day; and Liu Hong (劉洪), the God of the Hour. Their names also appear in Investiture of the Gods.

In Journey to the West, Sun Wukong calls on the Gongcao and other gods for help. At Eagle Grief Stream (鷹愁澗), the gods tell him that Guanyin has sent them to protect Tang Sanzang. Wukong asks them to give their names and tells the God of the Day and other gods to guard his master while he goes to fight the dragon that ate Tang Sanzang's horse. Later, Wukong sends the God of the Day to find vegetarian food for his master.

== Interpretation ==
Scholar Fong-mao Lee writes that the group of guards brings Buddhist and Daoist gods together. The Gongcao and the Six Ding and Six Jia come from Daoism, while the Jiedi and Jialan come from Buddhism. Lee says the gods do more than protect the travellers. They also watch their actions and test them during the journey. He links this mix of Buddhist and Daoist gods to the idea of the "Three Teachings as One" (三教合一), which was common during the Ming dynasty.
