= Taizi Changqin =

Deity in Chinese folk religion

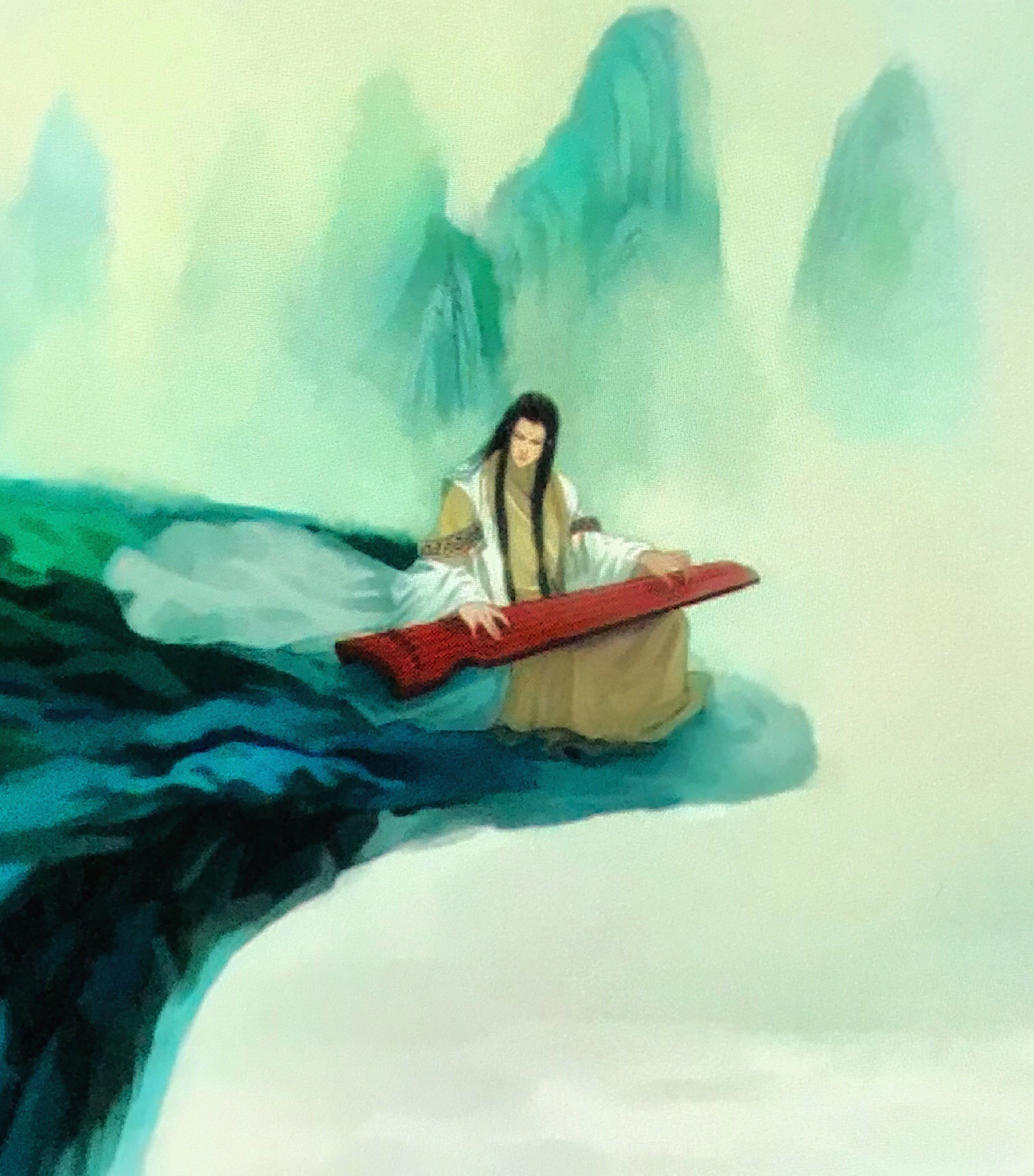
- Painting of Taizi Changqin
- Traditional Chinese: 太子長琴
- Simplified Chinese: 太子长琴
- Literal meaning: Crown Prince Long-Zither
Transcriptions
Standard Mandarin
- Hanyu Pinyin: Tàizǐ Chángqín
- Wade–Giles: T'ai-tzu Chang-chin

Taizi Changqin (Chinese: 太子长琴, also Prince Changqin) is a deity in Chinese mythology, regarded as the mythological ancestor of Chinese music and melody. His story is recorded in the ancient Chinese text Classic of Mountains and Seas (Shanhai jing, 山海经).

== Legends ==
According to the Classic of Mountains and Seas, Prince Changqin belonged to the divine lineage of the ancient sovereign Zhuanxu. The genealogy given in the text traces his ancestry from Zhuanxu to Laotong, who fathered the fire god Zhurong. Zhurong was, in turn, the father of Prince Changqin. However, broader Chinese mythological traditions contain conflicting accounts regarding Zhurong's exact identity, which inherently affects Changqin's ancestral origins. According to historical classifications, there are two main genealogical systems for Zhurong: the "Northern Zhurong system" (北方祝融体系), which identifies him as Chongli (重黎), the Fire Minister (火正) of the Zhuanxu clan; and the "Southern Zhurong system" (南方祝融体系), which asserts that Zhurong was actually a descendant of the Yan Emperor (炎帝).

He was expected to succeed his father as ruler and was therefore given the title of crown prince. In later interpretations of the conflict between Zhurong and Gonggong, Changqin is said to have helped his father expand their tribe’s influence into the areas of present-day Zhejiang and Jiangxi.

The classic also records that Prince Changqin resided on Mount Yao (榣山), where he is said to have first created musical airs or melodies (始作乐风). Later mythological interpretations associate him with the origin of music and describe his playing as attracting three kinds of five-colored birds: the Feng bird (凤鸟), the Huang bird (凰鸟), and the luan bird (鸾鸟).

== Historical prototype ==
An interpretation by author Linwu Gongzi has proposed that Prince Changqin may have been a mythological representation of Yuxiong (鬻熊), also known as Xueyan (穴酓), the legendary ancestor of the ancient State of Chu. According to this view, the character qin (琴) in Changqin's name may have functioned as a phonetic loan character (通假字), related to xiong (熊) and yan (酓) in ancient Chinese. The theory further connects this interpretation with records referring to the kings of Chu as the "Chu Qin lineage" (楚琴氏).

== In popular culture ==
Prince Changqin appears in the Gu Jian Qi Tan franchise, where his mythology is expanded into a major part of the story. In the franchise's lore, he was originally a sentient zither named Feng Lai (凤来), crafted by his father Zhurong and later given human form by the goddess Nüwa. He becomes an immortal and befriends a water serpent or dragon named Qianyu (悭臾). After a catastrophe involving the pillar of heaven at Mount Buzhou, Prince Changqin is punished by the Heavenly Emperor, and his soul is shattered during reincarnation.

In the 2014 live-action television adaptation Swords of Legends, the protagonist Baili Tusu, played by Li Yifeng, carries half of Prince Changqin's soul. This forms one of the central plot elements of the series. The backstory between Prince Changqin and Qianyu was also discussed by mainstream media as an important emotional element in the drama's popularity in China.

== See also ==
- Chinese mythology
- Little Crown Prince Zhang
- Zhuanxu
