= Wuzhiqi =

Supernatural being in Chinese mythology

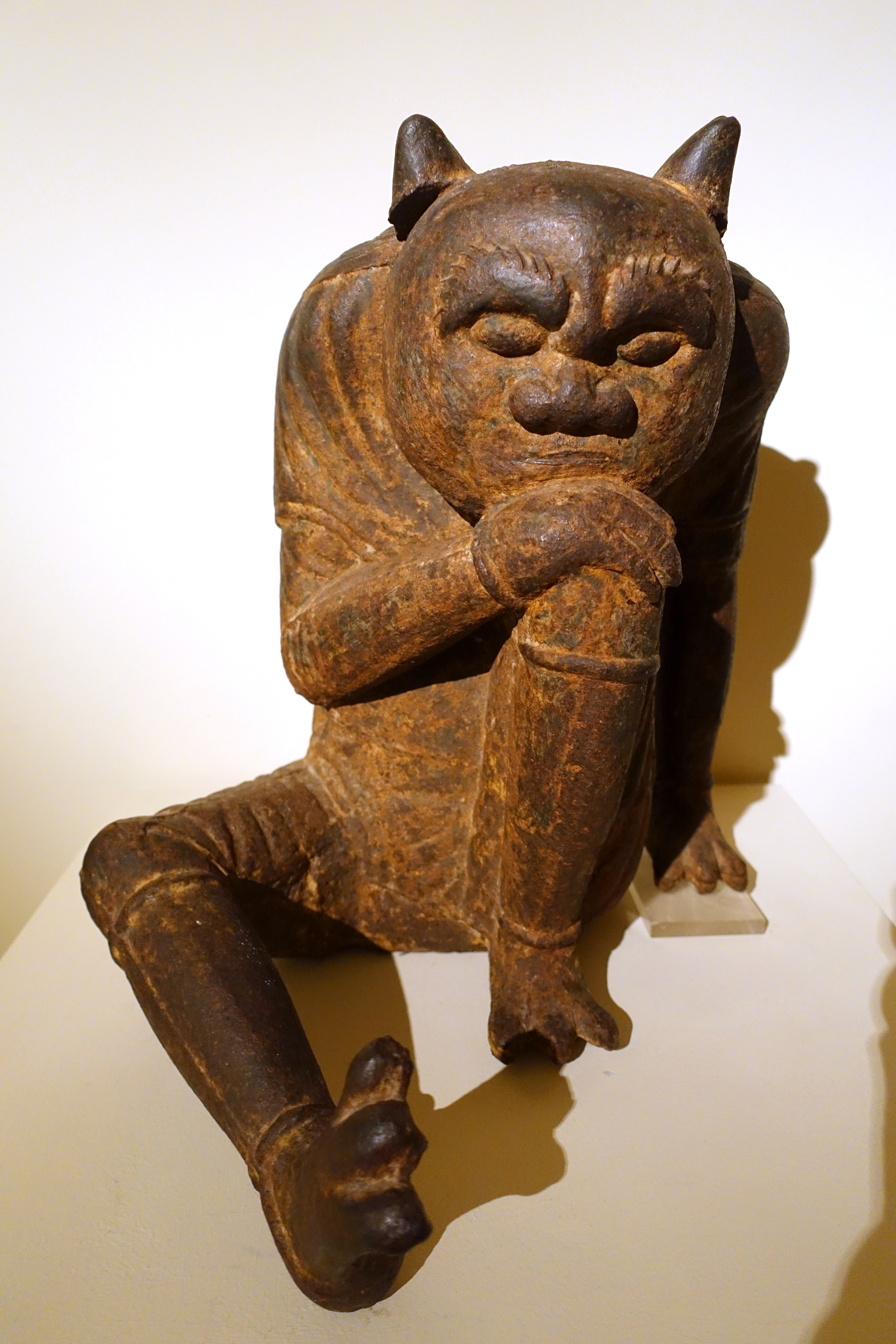
Wuzhiqi exhibit in the Museum of Asian Art

Wuzhiqi (Chinese: 無支祁) (Note: Also written as 巫枝祇, 無支祁 or 無支奇.) is a supernatural being in Chinese mythology popularly depicted as a monkey-like aquatic demon and first described in the early 9th century.

== Attestations ==
The earliest description of Wuzhiqi can be found in the Tangguoshi Bu, (Note: Chinese: 《唐國史補》) Li Zhao's 9th-century supplement to the Book of Tang. It briefly tells of a fisherman in Chuzhou (楚州) who encounters a monkey demon with a black body and a white head in the Huai River. Wuzhiqi is also described in the Song dynasty anthology Taiping guangji as a "monkey-like demon" residing in the Huai River; it is defeated by Yu the Great and imprisoned under Turtle Mountain (龜山) as part of his effort to control the Great Flood. Wuzhiqi sometimes appears in the form of a woman, and has different names such as Guishan Shuimu and Sizhou Virgin.

== Influence ==
A cast-iron statue depicting Wuzhiqi was gifted to the German artist Hanna Bekker vom Rath and later housed at the Museum of Asian Art in Berlin. Described as the "most intriguing and puzzling gift" to the museum, it was only identified in 2001 by University of Hawaii professor Poul Andersen. Andersen also documented the emergence of Wuzhiqi-inspired cults in northern Anhui.

A popular argument first forwarded by Huang Zhigang offers that the Journey to the West protagonist Sun Wukong was modeled after Wuzhiqi. Anthony C. Yu writes in his unabridged translation of The Journey to the West that Wuzhiqi "has provided many scholars with a prototype of Sun Wukong" and that the author of Journey himself had "certainly" read of Wuzhiqi – in Chapter 66, it is referred to as the "Water Ape Great Sage" (水猿大聖) – but that Wuzhiqi and Sun Wukong are "kept quite distinct" in the novel.
