= Sun Wukong =

Character in Chinese mythology

Sun Wukong 孫悟空
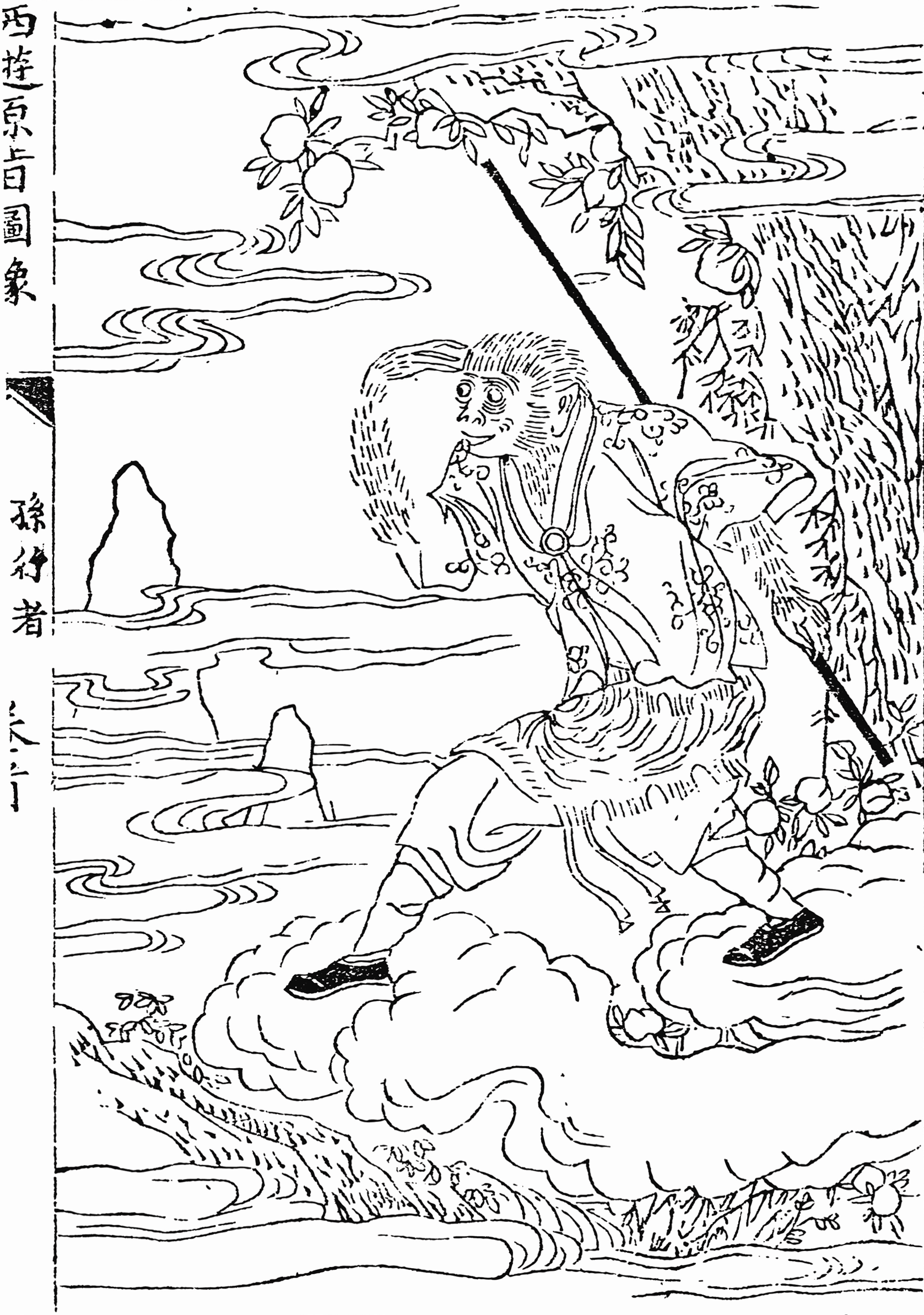
- A 19th-century illustration

In-universe information
- Species: Monkey
- Gender: Male
- Religion: Buddhism, Confucianism and Taoism
- Birthplace: Flowers and Fruit Mountain
- Source: Journey to the West, c. 1592 (print)
- Ability: Immortality, 72 Bian (Morphing Powers), Jin Dou Yun (Cloud Surfing), Jin Gang Bu Huai Zhi Shen (Superhuman Durability), Jin Jing Huo Yan (True Sight)
- Weapon: Ruyi Jingu Bang/Ding Hai Shen Zhen
- Height: 1.3m
- Master/Shifu: Patriarch Subodhi, Tang Sanzang

Sun Wukong

Chinese name
- Traditional Chinese: 孫悟空
- Simplified Chinese: 孙悟空
Transcriptions
Standard Mandarin
- Hanyu Pinyin: Sūn Wùkōng
- Bopomofo: ㄙㄨㄣ ㄨˋ ㄎㄨㄥ
- Wade–Giles: Sun^{1} Wu^{4}-k'ung^{1}
- IPA: [swə́n û.kʰʊ́ŋ]
other Mandarin
- Xiao'erjing: صٌ ءُ کوْ
- Dungan: Сүн Вўкун
Wu
- Romanization: Shu'n^{平}-Wh'khong^{入}
Gan
- Romanization: Sun¹ Ng⁵ kung¹
Hakka
- Romanization: Shu'n^{24} Whiu-khong^{2}
Yue: Cantonese
- Yale Romanization: Syūn Ngh-hūng
- Jyutping: Syun^{1} Ng^{6}-hung^{1}
- IPA: [syn˥ ŋ.hʊŋ˥]
Southern Min
- Hokkien POJ: Sun Ngō͘-khong
- Tâi-lô: Sun Ngōo-khong
Middle Chinese
- Middle Chinese: Swon Ngu-kuwng

Burmese name
- Burmese: စွန်းဝူခုံး
- IPA: [mjaʊʔ mí̃] (Myouk Minn)

Vietnamese name
- Vietnamese alphabet: Tôn Ngộ Không
- Chữ Hán: 孫悟空

Thai name
- Thai: ซุนหงอคง
- RTGS: Sun Ngokhong

Korean name
- Hangul: 손오공
- Hanja: 孫悟空
Transcriptions
- Revised Romanization: Son Ogong
- McCune–Reischauer: Son Ogong

Japanese name
- Kanji: 孫悟空
- Hiragana: そん ごくう
- Katakana: ソンゴクウ
Transcriptions
- Romanization: Son Gokū

Indonesian name
- Indonesian: Sun Go Kong

Khmer name
- Khmer: ស៊ុន អ៊ូខុង UNGEGN: Sŭn Ukhŏng; ALA-LC: S′un ʿ′ūkhung IPA: [sun ʔuːkʰoŋ]

Sun Wukong (Chinese: 孫悟空, Mandarin pronunciation: [swə́n ûkʰʊ́ŋ]), also known as the Monkey King, is a literary and religious figure best known as one of the main characters in the 16th-century Chinese novel Journey to the West. In the novel, Sun Wukong is an intelligent monkey (likely a rhesus macaque or a golden snub-nosed monkey) born from a stone who acquires supernatural powers through Taoist practices and consuming heavenly victuals. After rebelling against heaven, he is imprisoned under a mountain by the Buddha. Five hundred years later, he accompanies the monk Tang Sanzang riding on the White Dragon Horse and two other disciples, Zhu Bajie and Sha Heshang, on a journey to obtain Buddhist sutras in the West or Western Paradise, where Buddha and his followers dwell.

Sun Wukong possesses many abilities. He has supernatural strength and is able to support the weight of two heavy mountains on his shoulders while running "with the speed of a meteor". He is extremely fast, able to travel 108,000 li (54,000 km, 34,000 mi) in one somersault. He has vast memorization skills and can remember every monkey ever born. As king of the monkeys, it is his duty to keep track of and protect every monkey. Sun Wukong acquires the 72 Earthly Transformations, which allow him to access 72 unique powers, including the ability to transform into animals and objects. He is a skilled fighter, capable of defeating the best warriors of heaven. His hair has magical properties, capable of making copies of himself or transforming into various weapons, animals and other things. He has partial weather manipulation skills, can freeze people in place, and can become invisible.

The supernatural abilities displayed by Wukong and some other characters were widely thought of as "magic powers" by readers at the time of Journey to the West's writing, without much differentiation between them despite the various religious traditions that inspired them and their different and varied functions, and were often translated as such in non-Chinese versions of the book.

Some like Hu Shih suggested that Wu Cheng'en may have been influenced by the Hindu deity Hanuman from the Indian Hindu epic Ramayana in his depictions of the Monkey King.

== Origins and development ==
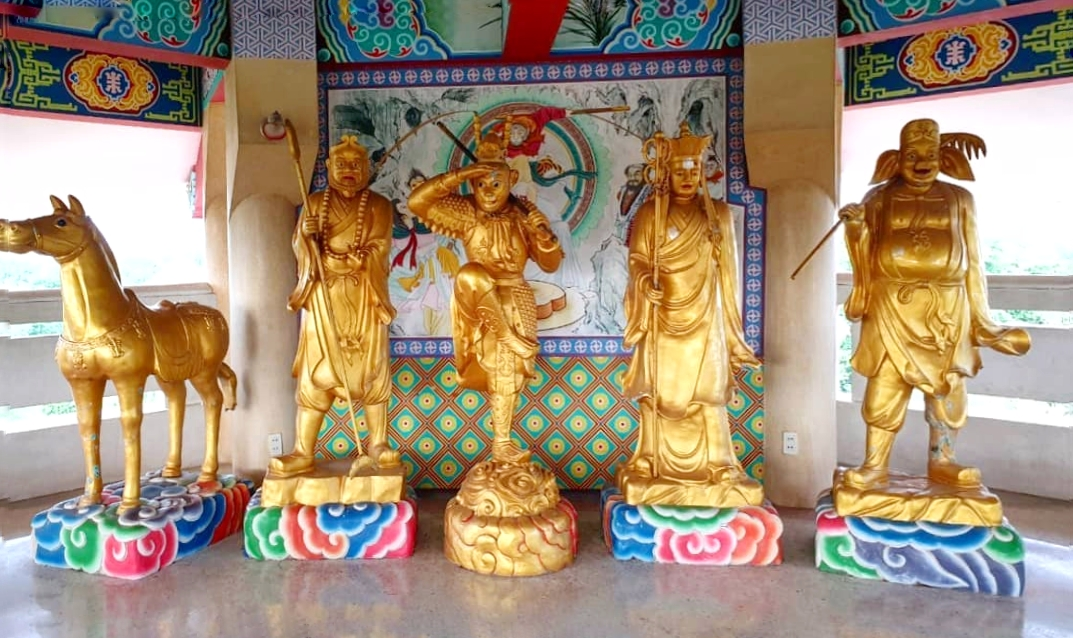
Golden statues of the White Dragon Horse, Sha Wujing, Sun Wukong, Tang Sanzang, and Zhu Bajie at the Rua Yai City Pillar Shrine in Suphan Buri, Thailand

Sun Wukong has a varied and highly debated background and cultural history. His inspiration might have come from many influences, generally relating to religious concepts.

Art historian Wu Hung argues that some of the earliest visual prototypes of the Monkey King legend can be found in Eastern Han dynasty (25–220) stone carvings from Sichuan.

According to Wu, one recurring theme is an ape abducting a woman. This motif appears on Han dynasty stone coffins from Xinjin and Neijiang, as well as a cliff tomb in Leshan. Wu suggests that it later influenced literary works such as the Tang dynasty tale The Supplement to Jiang Zong's Biography of a White Ape (补江总白猿传), which shares similarities with later Monkey King stories. A second theme depicts an archer confronting a white ape. One example appears on the Shen Fujun Que (沈府君阙), an Eastern Han stone gate tower in Qu County, Dazhou, built between 122 and 125 AD. The carving shows the legendary archer Yang Youji aiming at an ape. Wu interprets this scene as a possible early prototype of the later conflict between Erlang Shen and Sun Wukong. Other scholars disagree with this interpretation. Wang Ping, director of the Dazhou Cultural Relics Management Office, argues that the Shen Fujun Que carving is not mythological. Instead, he interprets it as a visual pun based on Han dynasty wordplay, in which the Chinese word for "monkey" (猴, hóu) sounds similar to "marquis" (侯, hóu), while "bird" (雀, què) resembles "noble rank" (爵, jué). According to Wang, the image symbolizes the pursuit of official rank and status rather than a mythological story.

To explain changes in Sun Wukong's character throughout Journey to the West, Li Tianfei, a scholar and editor at the Zhonghua Book Company, proposed the "Southern Ape and Northern Monkey" hypothesis. According to Li, the Monkey King in the final novel combines two separate folklore traditions that merged during the Yuan dynasty (1271–1368). The first tradition is the "Southern Ape" or "Great Sage". In parts of southern China, including Sichuan, Fujian, and Guangdong, local folklore featured powerful ape spirits that were worshipped and given titles such as "Great Sage Equal to Heaven" (齐天大圣). Li argues that this tradition influenced the opening chapters of the novel, where Sun Wukong rebels against Heaven and is commonly called the "Great Sage". The second tradition is the "Northern Monkey" or "Pilgrim". In northern China and the Western Regions, folklore featured a monkey guardian who accompanied and protected the monk Xuanzang on his journey. According to Li, this tradition influenced the pilgrimage portion of the novel, where Sun Wukong is frequently referred to as "Pilgrim" (行者). Li argues that the combination of these two traditions helps explain the differences between Sun Wukong's portrayal in the early and later parts of the novel. In the opening chapters, he appears as a rebellious figure who challenges Heaven, while during the pilgrimage he serves as Tang Sanzang's protector and often relies on assistance from other deities to defeat powerful demons.

The earliest known literary prototype of Sun Wukong appears in the Song dynasty (960–1279) storyteller's prompt-book Poetic Tale of Tripitaka of the Great Tang Fetching Scriptures (大唐三藏取經詩話). In this 17-chapter text, the character is known as the "Monkey Pilgrim" (猴行者, Hou Xingzhe). Unlike the Ming dynasty classic where the monkey is freed from under a mountain, the Monkey Pilgrim voluntarily approaches Xuanzang disguised as a white-robed scholar (白衣秀士). He reveals his true identity as the "Bronze-Headed, Iron-Browed Macaque King of the Eighty-Four Thousand Monkeys of Flower Fruit Mountain" and offers to protect the monk on his perilous journey to India.

The Monkey Pilgrim's weapons and magical abilities in the Poetic Tale differ significantly from the later Sun Wukong. Instead of wielding the iconic Golden-Hooped Rod (Ruyi Jingu Bang), his primary weapon is a golden-ringed monk's staff (金鐶錫杖), which he uses to cast spells, such as transforming it into a giant Yaksha or an iron dragon to devour enemies. He also utilizes a magical begging bowl to manipulate water and a cap of invisibility. The narrative contains the earliest seeds of Sun Wukong's famous "Havoc in Heaven" story arc. The Monkey Pilgrim recounts to Xuanzang that in his youth, he sneaked into the Queen Mother of the West's Heavenly Peach Garden and stole her immortal peaches. He was caught and severely punished with 800 strikes from an iron rod; millennia later, he claims his sides still ache from the beating. Because of this lingering trauma, he adamantly refuses Xuanzang's request to steal more peaches later in their journey. Throughout the text, the Monkey Pilgrim serves as Xuanzang's sole magical protector, as the characters of Zhu Bajie (Pigsy) and Sha Wujing (Sandy) had not yet been fully developed as fellow disciples. His combat encounters include defeating a shape-shifting White Tiger Demon (白虎精)—a direct prototype for the famous White Bone Demon—by shrinking into a rock, jumping down her throat, and violently expanding inside her stomach. Upon the successful completion of the pilgrimage, the Tang Emperor rewards the Monkey Pilgrim with the title of "Great Sage Steel Muscles and Iron Bones" (銅筋鐵骨大聖), foreshadowing his eventual elevation to Buddhahood in the later Ming novel.

One source for inspiration came from differing ways gibbons were venerated during the Chinese Chu kingdom (700–223 BC), and various legends about gibbons and monkeys in Chu and its successors. These legends and religious practices, alongside doctrine from Taoist organizations that reinforced them and combined elements from all five kinds of traditional religious Taoism, gave rise to stories and art motifs during the Han dynasty, eventually contributing to the Sun Wukong figure.

Some believe the association with Xuanzang is based on the first disciple of Xuanzang, Shi Pantuo. Hu Shih first suggested that Wu Cheng'en may have been influenced by the Hindu deity Hanuman from the Ramayana in his depictions of the Monkey King.

The Ramayana was first translated into Chinese in the 20th century, 500 years after Journey to the West was written, by Mi Wenkai, Sun Yong and Ji Xianlin. Although Ji Xianlin speculated that some related stories might have circulated in China before that, he also acknowledged that most scholars, including Lu Xun, believe the Ramayana had not been translated into Chinese or was accessible to Wu Cheng'en prior to the writing of Journey to the West. Instead, Lu Xun suggested the 9th-century Chinese deity Wuzhiqi, who appears as a sibling of Sun Wukong in older Yuan dynasty stories, as the inspiration. Anthony C. Yu writes in his unabridged translation of Journey to the West that Wuzhiqi "has provided many scholars with a prototype of Sun Wukong" and that the author of Journey himself had "certainly" read of Wuzhiqi.

Sun Wukong may have also been influenced by local folk religion from Fuzhou province, where monkey gods were worshipped long before the novel. This included the three Monkey Saints of Lin Shui Palace. Once fiends, they were subdued by the goddess Chen Jinggu, the Empress Lin Shui. The three were Dan Xia Da Sheng (丹霞大聖), the Red Face Monkey Sage, Tong Tian Da Sheng (通天大聖), the Black Face Monkey Sage, and Shuang Shuang San Sheng (爽爽三聖), the White Face Monkey Sage. The two traditional mainstream religions practiced in Fuzhou are Mahayana Buddhism and Taoism. Traditionally, many people practice both religions simultaneously. However, the roots of local religion dated back many years before the institutionalization of these traditions.

== Background ==
=== Birth and early life ===
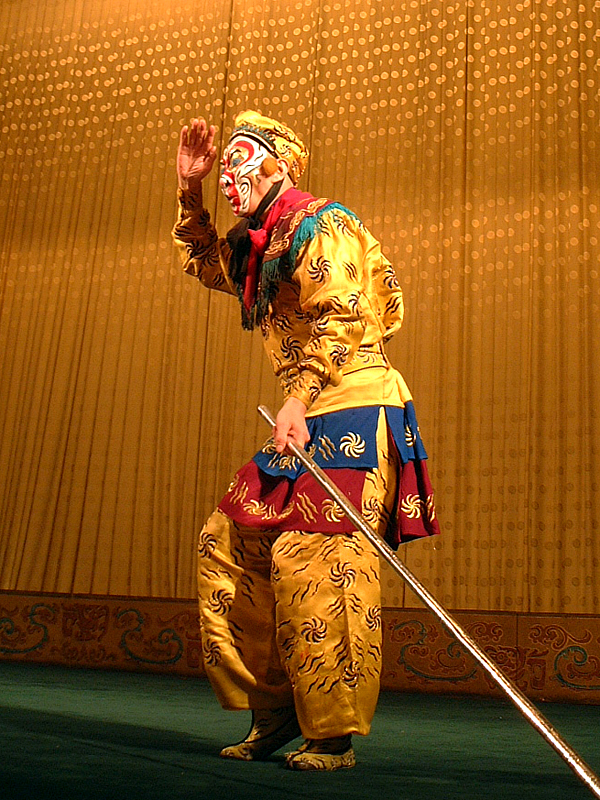
Depiction of Sun Wukong in a Peking opera scene set at the Forbidden Temple

According to Journey to the West, Sun Wukong is born from a magical stone on the Mountain of Flowers and Fruit. In Taoist thought, the stone receives nurture from heaven (yang) and earth (yin), which allows it to produce living beings. The stone develops a womb, which eventually breaks open to reveal a stone egg about the size of a ball. Wind blows on the egg, and it turns into a stone monkey. When the monkey moves its eyes, two beams of golden light shoot toward the Jade Palace and startle the Jade Emperor. He sends two officers to investigate. They report the stone monkey, adding that the light fades as the monkey eats and drinks. The Jade Emperor decides the monkey is nothing special.

On the mountain, the monkey joins a group of other monkeys. After playing, they bathe in a stream. One day, they decide to find the stream's source and climb to a waterfall. They agree that whoever goes through the waterfall, finds the source, and returns will become their king. The stone monkey volunteers and jumps through. Behind the waterfall, he finds a large iron bridge over rushing water, with a cave on the far side. He persuades the other monkeys to jump in, and they make the cave their home. Reminding them of their promise, they declare him their king. He takes the throne and names himself Handsome Monkey King (美猴王). Later, an older monkey dies. The Monkey King is upset and decides to leave the island on a homemade raft to find an immortal who can teach him to defeat death.

He reaches land and wanders through human towns. People flee from him because of his ape-like appearance. He takes some abandoned clothes, hides his face under a hood, and continues on foot. He passes through towns and sees what he takes to be human corruption and vice. He eventually enters a forest, where he hears a woodcutter singing. The woodcutter says an immortal in the forest taught him the song. The Monkey King finds a temple where the Taoist martial artist Puti Zushi lives. Puti Zushi first refuses him entry, but the Monkey King waits outside for months. Impressed by his persistence, Puti Zushi accepts him as a student. He gives him the religious name "Sun Wukong" and teaches him Taoist practices, including the way to immortality. Later, Puti Zushi warns Sun Wukong not to show off his skills needlessly. Others might ask to be taught, and if he refuses, they may resent him; if he agrees, they may cause trouble. He also forbids Sun Wukong from revealing his teacher's identity. Sun Wukong promises to keep it secret. For the rest of the book, when asked about his powers, he says he learned them in dreams. Still, he is often called a member of the "Monad Sect."

After returning home, Sun Wukong learns that a demon called the Demon King of Confusion has been kidnapping monkeys from the Mountain of Flowers and Fruit to use as slaves. He kills the demon and his followers and frees the monkeys. He also brings weapons from a nearby country for his subjects but cannot find one suited to himself. Hearing that Dragon Kings have many treasures, he travels underwater to the palace of a Dragon King. At the entrance, Sun Wukong asks to be announced. The Dragon King Ao Guang orders his guards to send him away. Sun Wukong enters anyway, brushing past the guards. Inside, he introduces himself and demands a weapon. Recognizing Sun Wukong's strength, the Dragon King pretends to be helpful and brings out several weapons. Sun Wukong tries each one but finds none heavy or strong enough. He then takes the golden-banded staff Ruyi Jingu Bang/Ding Hai Shen Zhen (如意金箍棒/定海神針), which stabilizes the Four Seas and belongs to Ao Guang. Only Sun Wukong is strong enough to wield it. The staff can change size, extend, fly, and attack on command. It weighs 13,500 jīn (about 7,960 kg). When not in use, Sun Wukong shrinks it to the size of a needle and keeps it in his ear. He also asks the Dragon King for royal clothing. The Dragon King summons other Dragon Kings, who give Sun Wukong a golden chain mail shirt (鎖子黃金甲; Suǒzihuángjīnjiǎ), a phoenix-feather cap (鳳翅紫金冠; Fèngchìzǐjinguān), and cloud-walking boots (藕絲步雲履; Ǒusībùyúnlǚ). Sun Wukong thanks them and leaves.

Back on his mountain, he shows his new weapon to the other monkeys. This draws the attention of other powerful beasts, who seek alliances. He forms a brotherhood called the Seven Sages (七聖) with the Bull Demon King (牛魔王), the Saurian Demon King (蛟魔王), the Roc Demon King (鵬魔王), the Lion Spirit King (獅狔王), the Macaque Spirit King (獼猴王), and the snub-nosed monkey Spirit King (禺狨王). Because he extorted the Dragon Kings, Sun Wukong is sentenced to death. He defies Hell's attempt to collect his soul. He erases his own name and the names of all monkeys he knows from the Book of Life and Death, a record said to contain every mortal name and control lifespans. The kings of the underworld report him to the Jade Emperor. The heavenly army tries repeatedly to destroy him, even attempting to erase him from existence, but fails.

=== Chaos in Heaven ===
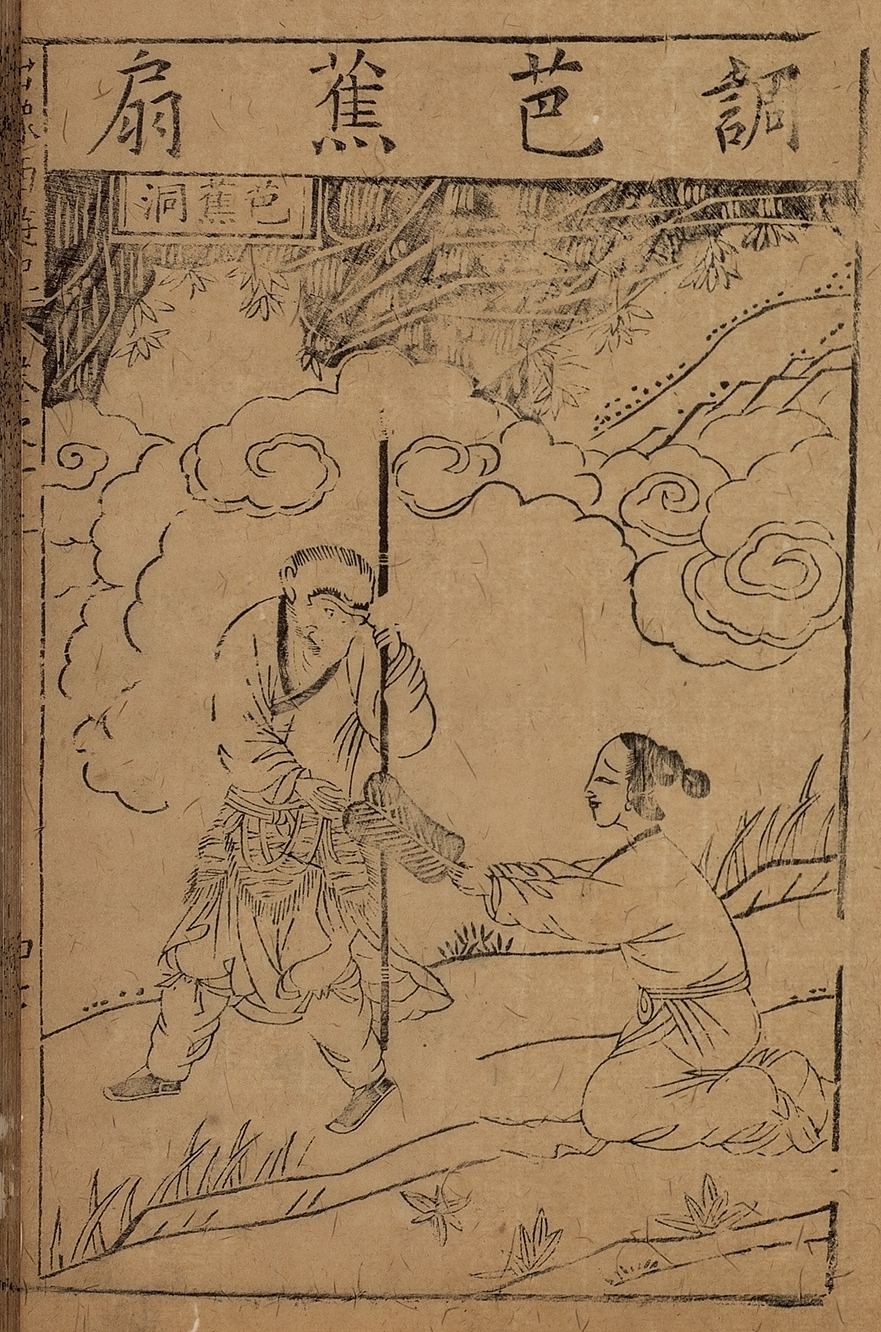
Sun Wukong and Princess Iron Fan, as depicted in the 1592 Journey to the West, Shidetang Hall of Jinling edition

Hoping that a promotion and a rank among the gods will make him more manageable, the Jade Emperor invites the Monkey King to Heaven. The Monkey King believes he is receiving an honourable place as one of the gods as he is told he will be made "Protector of the Horses", a fancy term the Heavens coined for a stable boy, the lowest job in heaven. When he discovers the importance of status in Heaven, and how he has been given the lowest position, the Monkey King sets the Cloud Horses free from the stable, then returns to his own kingdom and proclaims himself The Great Sage, Heaven's Equal.

The Heavens reluctantly recognize his self-proclaimed title after Gold Star advises the Jade Emperor against rushing into military action against the "brash, rude, and impudent" monkey, warning that failing to defeat Monkey would harm the reputation of Heaven. Gold Star advises the Jade Emperor to superficially appease Sun Wukong's vanity while treating him as a pet, and invite him back to Heaven to keep him from causing trouble on earth. The Jade Emperor agrees after Gold Star laughs that, in reality, the fanciful title is a meaningless joke revealing Sun Wukong's overconfidence and ignorance of the important workings of Heaven.

Sun Wukong suspects a trap but is happy when Gold Star, acting as an envoy, addresses him as the Great Sage Equal of Heaven and presents him with official papers. Gold Star tells Sun Wukong he has been granted a far more important position as "Guardian of the Heavenly Peach Garden", which peach-loving Sun Wukong accepts. Later, when seven heavenly maidens are sent by Queen Mother Xi Wangmu to pluck peaches for the Royal Banquet, Sun Wukong discovers every important god and goddess has been invited to the banquet except for him. When he tells the maidens he is the Great Sage Equal of Heaven, the maidens giggle, replying that everyone in Heaven knows he is merely an immortal who tends to the peach garden. The Monkey King's indignation then turns to open defiance.

During the preparations for the Royal Banquet, Sun Wukong sneaks in to taste the fine foods and drink royal wine. In a tipsy state, the Monkey King roams Heaven while all the gods and goddesses are on their way to the banquet. He reaches high levels of the palace that the authorities of Heaven leave unguarded, for they can only be accessed by deities of the highest and purest spiritual power. Upon realizing that he is at the top of the 33 layers of the heavenly palace, Sun Wukong steals and consumes Laozi's Pills of Immortality and Xi Wangmu's Peaches of Immortality, takes the remainder of the Jade Emperor's royal wine, and then escapes back to his kingdom in preparation for his rebellion.

The Jade Emperor rejects Gold Star's proposal for a peaceful resolution with Sun Wukong and orders his forces to mobilize. Sun Wukong defeats the Army of Heaven's 100,000 celestial warriors, the 28 constellations and the Four Heavenly Kings, under the command of Devaraja Li and his third son, Prince Nezha, despite the Heavenly weapons used against him.

Then Guanyin, the Boddhisattva of Mercy, and her disciple Muzha/Moksha arrive. Guanyin sends Muzha to inspect the situation and fight Sun Wukong. Muzha is defeated, and then Guanyin suggests the Jade Emperor's nephew Erlang Shen fight Wukong. Wukong and Erlang are evenly matched and eventually, both turn into terrifying figures, which scares Wukong's monkey army away. Sun Wukong is disheartened and turns into a fish to run away, then both of them keep shapeshifting to turn into more powerful things than the other, finally, Laozi throws his Diamond Jade ring at Wukong from behind while he is fighting, knocking him senseless and enabling Erlang to bind him up.

After several failed attempts at execution, Sun Wukong is locked into Laozi's eight-way trigram crucible for 49 days to be distilled into an elixir by samadhi fires; this will allow Laozi to regain his pills of longevity. The fire of the crucible is hot enough to burn beings of so much unspeakable power that they rival Buddha himself.

When the cauldron is opened 49 days later, the Monkey King jumps out, having survived by hiding in a corner marked by the wind trigram, where there is less fire. The heat from the samadhi fires has reinforced his bodily frame, making him stronger than ever before and impervious to greater damage. The heat gives him a new ability; the Monkey King can now recognize evil with his new huǒyǎn-jīnjīng (火眼金睛, lit. 'fiery eyes and golden pupils'). Sun Wukong then proceeds to destroy the crucible and makes his way to Heaven's main chamber to confront the Jade Emperor and his senior advisors.

=== Imprisonment ===
The Jade Emperor and the authorities of Heaven appeal to the Buddha, who arrives from his temple in the West in person. After listening to Sun Wukong, who makes a case that he should be the new Jade Emperor, the Buddha makes a bet that the Monkey King cannot escape from his palm. The Monkey King smugly accepts the bet. He leaps and flies all the way to the edge of the universe. Seeing nothing there but five towering pillars, the Monkey King believes that he has reached the end of all existence.

To prove his trail, he marks a pillar with a phrase declaring himself the Great Sage Equal to Heaven and urinates on the middle pillar. He then leaps back and returns to Buddha's palm to claim his victory in winning the bet. Sun Wukong is then very surprised to find that the five "pillars" he found are merely fingers of the Buddha's hand, finding it impossible to believe. When the Monkey King tries to escape the palm, Buddha turns his hand into a mountain of rocks, sending Sun Wukong hurtling back down to earth.

Before the Monkey King can lift the mountain off, the Buddha seals him there, using a paper talisman bearing the mantra, Om Mani Padme Hum, in gold letters. The Monkey King remains imprisoned in stocks for five hundred years, to "learn patience and humility", with only his head and hands protruding from the base of the mountain. The Buddha arranges two earth spirits to feed the Monkey King iron pellets when he is hungry, and molten copper when he is thirsty.

=== Disciple to Tang Sanzang ===
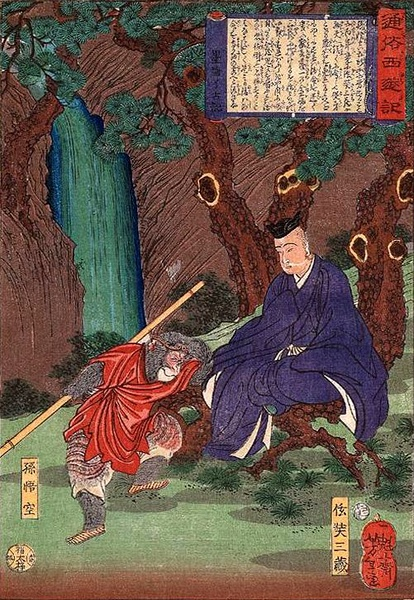
Sun Wukong with Tang Sanzang

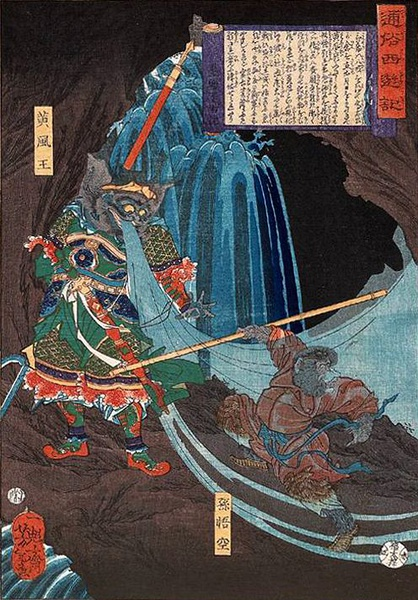
Sun Wukong fighting a wind demon

Five hundred years later, the Bodhisattva Guanyin searches for disciples to protect a pilgrim on a journey to the West to retrieve the Buddhist sutras. Upon hearing of this, the Monkey King offers to serve the pilgrim, Tang Sanzang, a monk of the Tang dynasty, in exchange for his freedom after the pilgrimage is complete. Understanding Sun Wukong will be difficult to control, Guanyin gives Tang Sanzang a gift from the Buddha: a magical circlet which, once the Monkey King is tricked into putting it on, can never be removed. When Tang Sanzang chants a certain sutra, the band will tighten and cause an unbearable headache. Guanyin gives the Monkey King three special hairs, only to be used in dire emergencies. Under Tang Sanzang's supervision, the Monkey King is allowed to journey to the West.

Throughout the novel, the Monkey King faithfully helps Tang Sanzang on his journey to India. They are joined by "Pigsy" (猪八戒; Zhū Bājiè) and "Sandy" (沙悟淨; Shā Wùjìng), both of whom accompany the priest to atone for their previous crimes. Tang Sanzang's safety is constantly under threat from demons and other supernatural beings, as well as bandits, as they believe that by eating Tang Sanzang's flesh, one will obtain immortality and great power. The Monkey King often acts as Tang Sanzang's bodyguard to combat these threats. The group encounters a series of eighty-one tribulations before accomplishing their mission and returning safely to China.

During the journey, the Monkey King learns about virtues and the teachings of Buddhism. There, the Monkey King attains Buddhahood, becoming the "Victorious Fighting Buddha" (鬥戰勝佛; Dòu-zhànshèng-fó), for his service and strength. The Monkey King is revealed to know about the fate of Tang Sangzang and also of his knowledge in many other things, as on three occasions he knew that the monk was supposed to suffer and he also cured a king who had been ill for many years, and knew properties of herbs no one knew of. Wukong also mentions being sworn brothers with Erlang Shen.

== Names and titles ==
Sun Wukong is known/pronounced as Syun^{1} Ng^{6}-hung^{1} in Cantonese, Son Gokū in Japanese, Sonogong in Korean, Sun Ngō͘-Khong in Minnan/Hokkien, Tôn Ngộ Không in Vietnamese, Sung Ghokong or Sung Gokhong in Javanese, Sun Ngokong in Thai, Wu Khone in Burmese, and Sun Gokong in Malay.

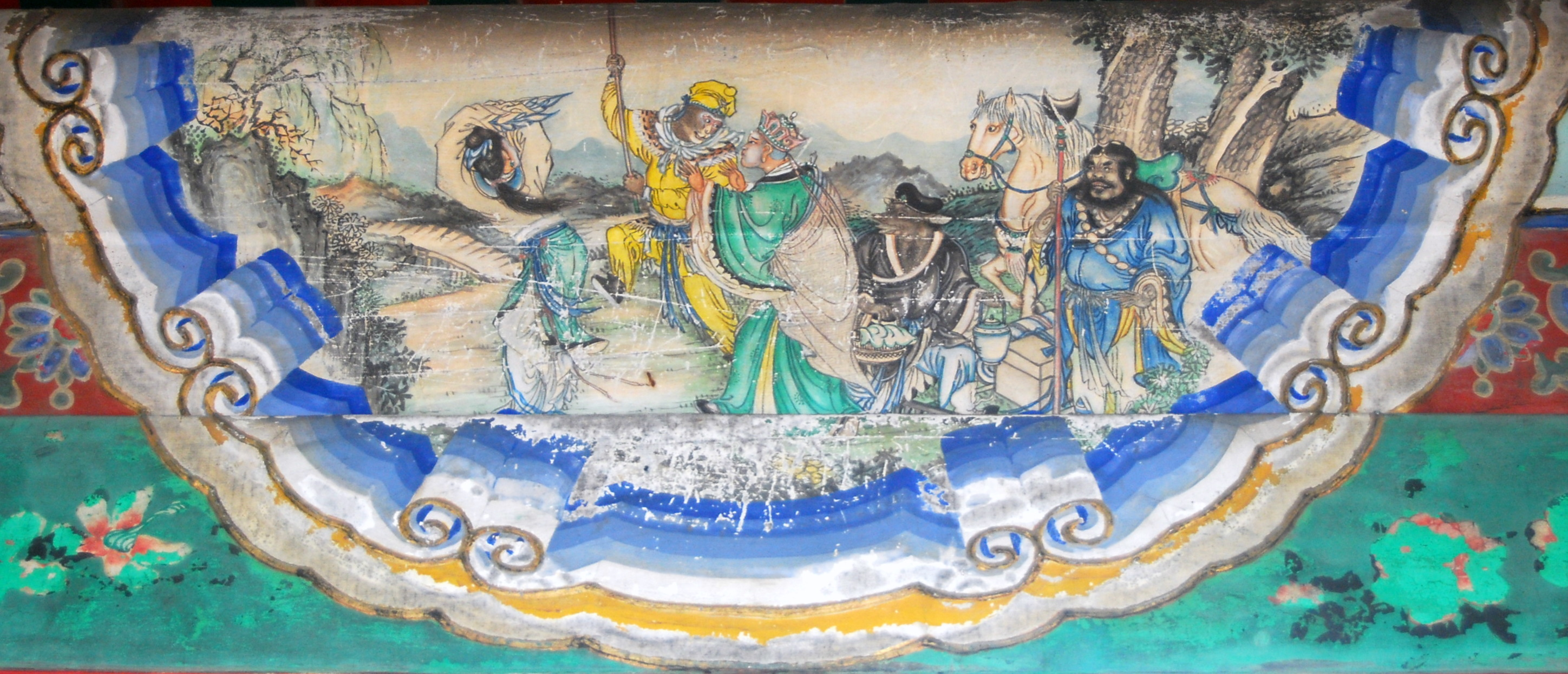
A painted mural depicting Sun Wukong, in yellow, and other main characters of the novel

Listed in the order that they were acquired:

Shí Hóu (石猴)
"Stone Monkey". This refers to his physical essence, being born from a sphere of rock after millennia of incubation on the Bloom Mountains/Flower-Fruit Mountain.
Měi Hóuwáng (美猴王)
"Handsome Monkey-King", Houwang for short. The adjective Měi means "beautiful, handsome, pretty". It also means "to be pleased with oneself", referring to his ego. Hóu ("monkey") also highlights his "naughty and impish" character.
Sūn Wùkōng (孫悟空)
The name given to him by his first master, Patriarch Bodhi (Subodhi). The surname Sūn was given as an in-joke about the monkey, as monkeys are also called húsūn (猢猻), and can mean either a literal or a figurative monkey (or a macaque). The surname Sūn (孫) and the "monkey" Sūn (猻) only differ in that the latter carries an extra "dog" (quǎn) radical to highlight that 猻 refers to an animal. The Monkey King later conferred his new surname to his entire clan back on Mount Huaguo. The given name, Wùkōng, means "awakened to emptiness", sometimes translated as "aware of vacuity". The name Sun Wukong first appeared in the play Drama of Journey to the West (西遊記雜劇) by Yang Jingxian (楊景賢, d. early 1400s). In the play, Bodhisattva Guanyin gives him the name during a scene in which she has a circlet put on his head and presents a robe to cover his animal body.
Bìmǎwēn (弼馬溫)
The title of the keeper of the Heavenly Horses, a punning of bìmǎwēn (避馬瘟; 'avoiding the horses' plague'). A monkey was often put in a stable, as people believed its presence could prevent the horses from catching illness. Sun Wukong was given this position by the Jade Emperor after his first intrusion into Heaven. He was promised that it was a good position to have and that he would be in the highest position. After discovering it was one of the lowest jobs in Heaven, he became angry, smashed the entire stable, set the horses free, and then quit. From then on, the title bìmǎwēn was used by his adversaries to mock him.
Qítiān Dàshèng (齊天大聖)
Means "The Great Sage, Heaven's Equal". Wùkōng took this title suggested to him by one of his demon friends, after he wreaked havoc in heaven people who heard of him called him Great Sage (大聖; Dàshèng). The title originally holds no power, though it is officially a high rank. The Jade Emperor later granted the title the responsibility to guard the Heavenly Peach Garden, keeping Sun Wukong busy so he would not make trouble.
Xíngzhě (行者)
Meaning "ascetic", it refers to a wandering monk, a priest's servant, or a person engaged in performing religious austerities. Tang Sanzang calls Wukong Sūn-xíngzhě when he accepts him as his companion. This is pronounced in Japanese as gyōja, making him Son-gyōja.
Dòu-zhànshèng-fó (鬥戰勝佛)
"Victorious Fighting Buddha". Wukong was given this name once he ascended to Buddhahood at the end of the Journey to the West. This name is also mentioned during the traditional Chinese Buddhist evening services, specifically during the eighty-eight Buddha's repentance.
Língmíng-shí-hóu (靈明石猴)
"Intelligent Stone Monkey". Wukong is revealed to be one of the four spiritual primates that do not belong to any of the ten categories that all beings in the universe are classified under. His fellow spiritual primates are the Six-Eared Macaque (六耳獼猴), who is one of his antagonists in the main storyline, the Red-Bottomed Horse Monkey (赤尻馬猴; Chìkāo-mǎ-hóu), and the Long-Armed Ape Monkey (通臂猿猴; Tōngbì-yuánhóu), neither of who make actual appearances, only mentioned in passing by the Buddha. The powers and abilities of each are equal to that of the others.
Sūn Zhǎnglǎo (孫長老)
Used as an honorific for a monk.

In addition to the names used in the novel, the Monkey King has other names in different languages:

- Kâu-chê-thian (猴齊天) in Minnan (Taiwan): "Monkey, Equal of Heaven".
- Maa^{5} lau^{1} zing^{1} (馬騮精) in Cantonese (Hong Kong and Guangdong): "Monkey Imp", called so by his enemies.

== Abilities ==
Apart from his powerful staff, martial arts skills, and superhuman physical prowess, Sun Wukong is notable for wielding a sundry of magic powers, some featured many times throughout the novel and others only once, and most of them cultivated during his Taoist training under Puti Zushi. Said powers include, but are not limited to:

- Cloud Somersaulting (觔斗雲; Jīndǒuyún):

The Monkey King's infamous ability to travel or "leap" 108,000 li (54,000 km, 34,000 mi) in one somersault. The ability, oft portrayed as Wukong riding a nimbus-like cloud, requires a magic hand sign, an oral spell, a fist clench, and a body shake. Wukong's master Puti Zushi taught this ability to the monkey to give him a style of flying that complements his penchant for jumping.

- Seventy-two Transformations (七十二般變化; Qīshí'èr-bān Biànhuà):

Also known as Multitude of Terrestrial Killers (地煞數; Dìshà Shù). A power originally learned by the Monkey King from his master Puti Zushi to avoid the Three Calamities (三災利害), sent by heaven to punish those who attain immortality by means of Taoist self-cultivation. The Monkey King was given the choice between either learning the "Multitude of the Heavenly Ladle" (天罡數) that permits 36 changes, or the "Multitude of Terrestrial Killers/Earthly Fiends" that allows for 72, and chose the latter. It allows the monkey to transform his body into virtually anything, from humanoid forms to animal ones, including small insects, to miscellaneous objects and even entire buildings, or to simply change his size (from gigantic to microscopically small). While fighting Nezha, the Monkey King copied the latter's war form with three heads and six arms (三頭六臂), showcasing his ability to precisely alter specific parts of his body. Overall, the "Seventy-two Changes" metaphorically designate an endless variety of transformations, not a limit in a literal sense. In addition, it is suggested by Zhu Bajie (but never shown) that for each of the 72 Changes, Sun Wukong has an extra life—similar to the nine lives of a cat—and according to Sha Wujing, a surplus of heads, such as when he regrows his after the original is cut off during a contest of magic with the Tiger, Elk and Antelope Immortals.

- Immortal Breath (仙氣; Xiānqì):

The Monkey King's magic breath, which is what allows him to transform his hairs and staff, among other such mystic effects as: manipulating his own spirit, healing wounds, or divinely empowering others.

- Bod(y/ies) Beyond The Body (身外身法; Shēnwàishēn Fǎ):

The Monkey King's ability to transform any one of his 84,000 hairs into whatever he wishes upon the command "Change!" (「變！」; "Biàn!"): from humanoid figures to animals (like insects), to miscellaneous items (tools, money, and even food). However, the monkey mainly uses this power throughout the novel to spawn clones of himself, with Wukong boasting that a single hair can be multiplied into millions and even billions. A seemingly separate ability (denoted as such in the novel) is called Method of Bodily Division (分身法; Fēnshēn Fǎ), also allowing the Monkey King to create clones of himself (see also the Daoist concept of Fenshen).

- Method of Imitating/Modelling Heaven and Earth (法天象地; Fǎtiān Xiàngdì):

An extension of the Monkey King's shapeshifting powers, it allows him to grow into a monstrous, giant-sized form upon uttering the command "Grow!" (「長！」; "Zhǎng!"). Such form is described as being 10,000 zhang (萬丈) in height, but this may be metaphorical for a much larger, cosmically proportioned size, since Sun Wukong boasts about his ability to fill the universe with his body should he will it. His appearance also changes significantly while in this form, where his hair turns red, face turns blue, and grows sharp fangs.

- Three Life-Saving Hairs (三根救命的毫毛; Sāngēn Jiùmìng de Háomáo):

Three special hairs created from willow branch leaves that are gifted to the Monkey King by Guanyin, allowing him to create anything he wishes specifically in fulfillment of his duties as Tripitaka's guardian; they are notably distinct from Wukong's other magic hairs.

- Diamond Body (金鋼之軀; Jīngāng zhī Qū); AKA Copper Head, Iron Limbs 銅頭鐵臂; Tóngtóu Tiěbì):

Refers to the Monkey King's near-invulnerable body, immune to hits from blades or mallets, lightning, fire, poison, etc.

- Fiery Eyes, Golden Pupils (火眼金睛; Huǒyǎn Jīnjīng):

Truth-seeing eyes, able to distinguish certain dualities (good from evil, truth from lies, the rich from poor, etc.) as well as see through illusions and magical disguises/transformations. It also allows Wukong to see far distances in a clairvoyant fashion (1,000 li during the day and between 300 to 500 li at night).

- Method of Bodily Concealment (隱身法; Yǐnshēn Fǎ):

A spell that allows Wukong to become invisible to the eyes of humans and even gods and spirits. See also Gathering Mists, Intangible Form (聚形散气; Jùxíng Sànqì), a method of stealth, by means of transforming, almost, into air and wind, used by Wukong.

- Body-Departing Spirit (身出一個神; Shēnchū Yīgè Shén):

AKA Means of the Spirit Leaving the Body (出神的手段; Chūshén de Shǒuduàn); essentially the ability of astral projection.

- Body-Fixing Method (定身法; Dìngshēn Fǎ):

A spell that lets the Monkey King freeze humans, gods, and spirits alike in place, for up to a full day's worth of time. This is usually done by repeatedly saying the command "Freeze!" (「住！」; "Zhù!") and pointing at a target.

- Lock-Breaking Method (解鎖法; Jiěsuǒ Fǎ):

Allows Wukong, with only a point of his finger or staff, to open any lock.

- Protective Circles (圈子; Quānzi):

The Monkey King draws a circle on the ground with his staff, which functions as a protective ward or barrier as tough as an iron wall. Used to protect Tripitaka, it dissuades enemies from approaching, whether they be tigers, wolves, ogres, or demons.

- Fire Avoidance Spell (避火訣; Bìhuǒ Jué):

Allows Wukong to survive fire; it does not work against the True Samādhi Fire (三昧眞火; Sānmèi Zhēnhuǒ).

- Water Avoidance Spell (避水訣; Bìshuǐ Jué); Method of Water Restriction (閉水法; Bìshuǐ Fǎ):

Spells that, respectively, allow the Monkey King to ward off water and to travel through water unimpeded, by opening waterways. Still, the monkey is unable to properly fight underwater.

== Immortality ==
Sun Wukong is said to have gained immortality through nine different means and instances, which together made him one of the most immortal and invincible beings in all of creation.

=== Disciple to Puti Zushi ===
After feeling down about the future and death, Wukong sets out to find the immortal Taoist patriarch Puti Zushi to learn how to be immortal. There, Wukong learns spells to grasp all five elements and cultivate the way of immortality, as well as the 72 Earthly Transformations. After seven years of training with the sage, Wukong gains the secret formula to immortality. It is noted that the Court of Heaven does not approve of this method of immortality.

=== Book of Mortals ===
In the middle of the night, Wukong's soul is tied up and dragged to the World of Darkness. He is informed there that his life in the human world has come to an end. In anger, Wukong fights his way through the World of Darkness to complain to "The Ten Kings", who are the judges of the dead. The Ten Kings try to address the complaint and calm Wukong by saying many people in the world have the same name and the fetchers of the dead may have gotten the wrong name. Wukong demands to see the register of life and death, then scribbles out his name, thus making him untouchable by the fetchers of death, along with the names of all of the monkeys in his tribe. It is because Wukong has learned magical arts as a disciple to Puti Zushi that he can scare the Ten Kings, demanding from them the book of mortals and removing his name, thus making him even more immortal. After this incident, the Ten Kings complained to the Jade Emperor.

=== The Peaches of Immortality ===
Soon after the Ten Kings complained to the Jade Emperor, the Court of Heaven appoints Sun Wukong as "Keeper of the Heavenly Horses", a fancy name for a stable boy. Angered by this, Wukong rebels, and the Havoc in Heaven begins. During the Havoc in Heaven, Wukong is assigned to be the "Guardian of the Heavenly Peach Garden". The garden includes three types of peaches, each of which grants over 3,000 years of life. The first type blooms every three thousand years. Anyone who eats it will become immortal, and their body will become both light and strong. The second type blooms every six thousand years. Anyone who eats it will be able to fly and enjoy eternal youth.

The third type blooms every nine thousand years. Anyone who eats it will become "eternal as heaven and earth, as long-lived as the sun and moon". While serving as the guardian, Wukong does not hesitate to eat the peaches, thus granting him immortality and the abilities that come with the peaches. If Wukong had not been appointed as the Guardian of the Heavenly Peach Garden, he would not have eaten the Peaches of Immortality and would not have gained another level of immortality.

=== Heavenly Wine ===
Because of Wukong's rebellious antics, Wukong is not considered as an important celestial deity and is thus not invited to the Queen Mother of the West's royal banquet. After finding out that every other important deity was invited, Wukong impersonates one of the deities that was invited and shows up early to see why the banquet is important. He immediately is distracted by the aroma of the wine and decides to steal and drink it. The heavenly wine has the ability to turn anyone who drinks it into an immortal.

=== Pills of Longevity ===
While drunk from the heavenly wine, Wukong stumbles into Laozi's alchemy lab, where he finds Laozi's pills of longevity, known as "The Immortals' Greatest Treasure". Filled with curiosity about the pills, Wukong eats a gourd of them. Those who eat the pills will become immortal. If Wukong had not been drunk from the heavenly wine, he would not have stumbled into Laozi's alchemy lab and eaten the pills of longevity.

=== The Aftermath of Immortality ===
Following Wukong's three cause-and-effect methods of immortality during his time in heaven, he escapes back to his home at the Mountain of Flowers and Fruit. The Court of Heaven finds out what Wukong has done and a battle to capture Wukong ensues. Due to the five levels of immortality Wukong has achieved, his body became nearly invincible and survives the multiple execution attempts by heaven. In the notable last execution, Wukong was placed inside Laozi's furnace in the hope that he would be distilled into the elixir of the pills of immortality. Wukong survives 49 days of the samadhi fire in Laozi's furnace and gains the ability to recognize evil.

Meanwhile, being refined in the crucible extracts yet more of the impurities of mortality and leaves him with another immortality. In desperation, the Court of Heaven seeks help from Buddha, who imprisons Wukong under a mountain, after having tricked him into agreeing to a wager. Wukong's immortality and abilities ultimately come into use after Guanyin suggests he becomes a disciple of Tang Sanzang in the Journey to the West. In the story, he protects Sanzang from evil demons who wish to eat Sanzang to achieve immortality. Wukong's own immortality protects him from the various ways the demons try to kill him, such as fighting, beheading, disembowelling, poisoning, and boiling oil.

Early in the Pilgrimage, Wukong ate another Pill of Immortality, meant for the Black Wind Bear Guai. Sometime during the journey, Wukong and his companions obtain ginseng fruit (人參果; Man-fruit), a fruit even rarer and more powerful than the Peaches of Immortality, as only 30 of them will grow off one particular tree only found on the Longevity Mountain (萬壽山) every 10,000 years. While one smell can grant 360 years of life, consuming one will grant another 47,000 years of life.

In addition to all of the immortality-granting wines and medicines that the Monkey King had consumed while in heaven, upon reaching the Buddha's temple, pilgrims were provided with Buddhist equivalents of such foods, therefore making Sun Wukong even more immortal; a 9-fold immortal.

== In Xiyoubu ==
The brief satirical novel Xiyoubu (西遊補; "Supplement to the Journey to the West"), c. 1640, follows Sun Wukong as he is trapped in a magical dream world created by the Qing Fish Demon, the embodiment of desire (情; qing). Wukong travels back and forth through time, during which he serves as the adjunct King of Hell and judges the soul of the recently dead traitor Qin Hui during the Song dynasty, takes on the appearance of a beautiful concubine and causes the downfall of the Qin dynasty, and faces King Paramita, one of his five sons born to the demoness Princess Iron Fan, on the battlefield during the Tang dynasty.

The events of the Xiyoubu take place between the end of chapter 61 and the beginning of chapter 62 of Journey to the West. The author, Tong Yue (童說), wrote the book because he wanted to create an opponent—in this case, desire-itself—that Sun Wukong could not defeat with his great strength and martial skill.

== Influence ==
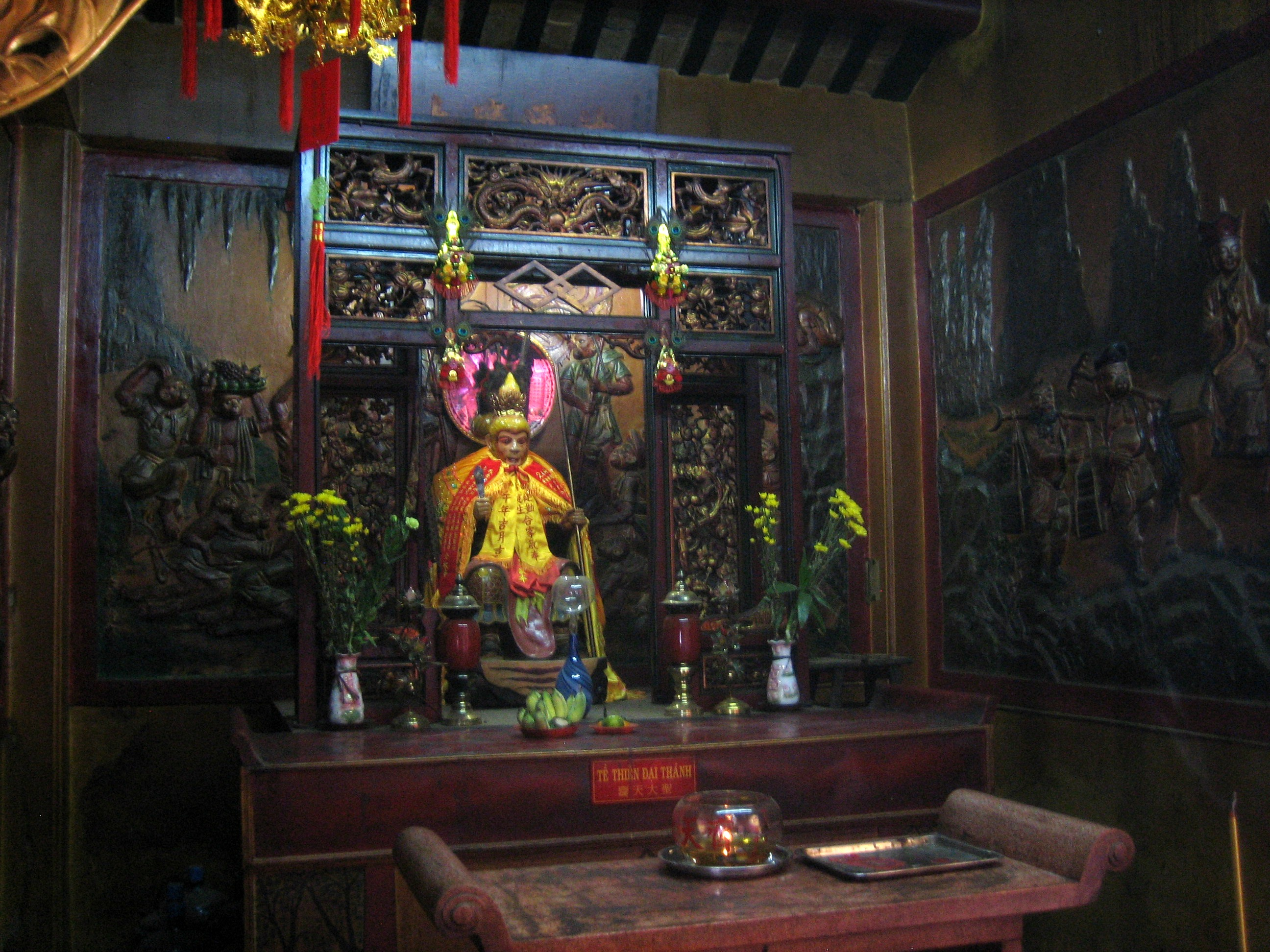
Sun Wukong's shrine at Thien Hau Temple, Ho Chi Minh City, Vietnam

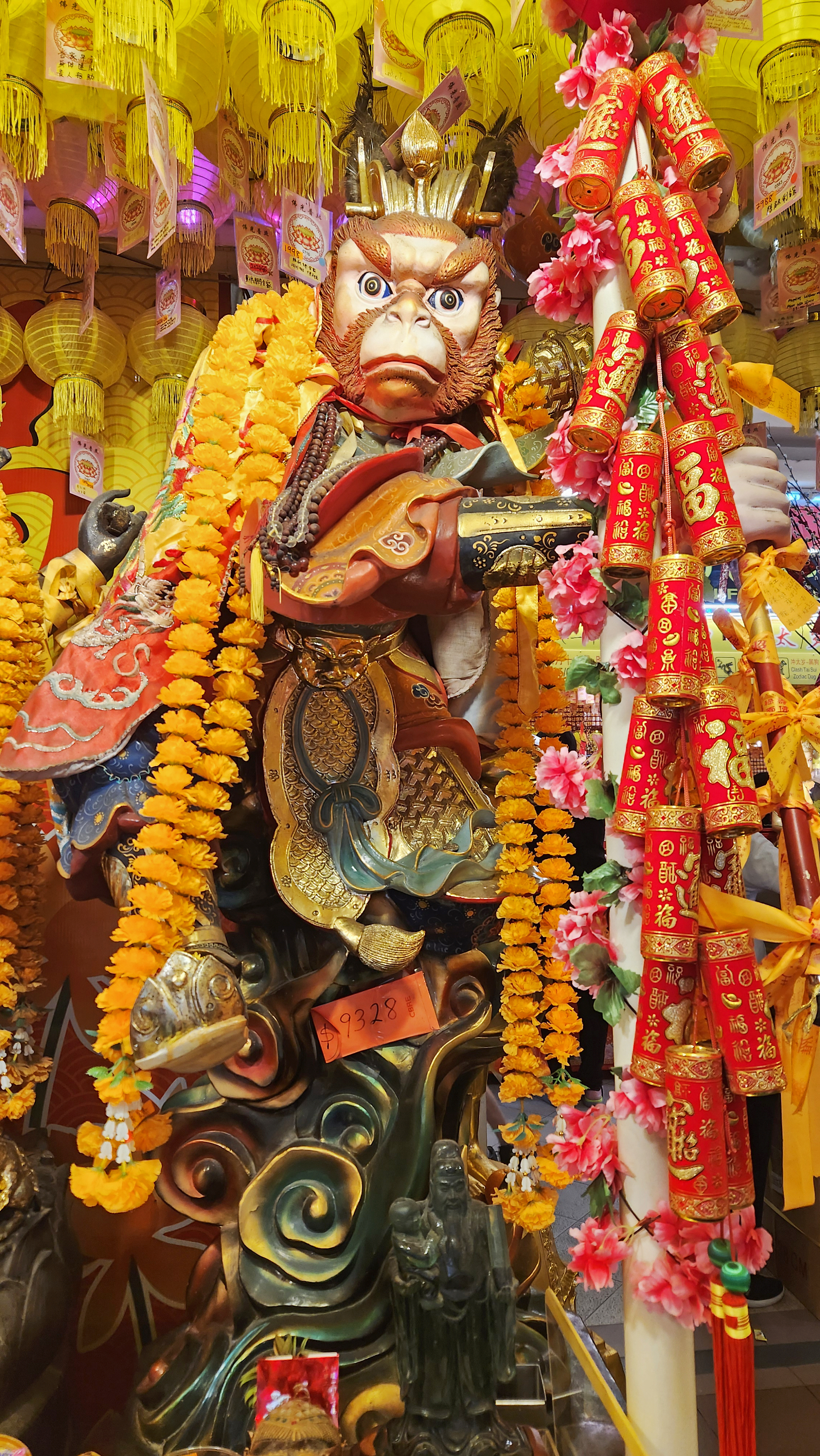
Sun Wukong statue and shrine at Waterloo Street, Singapore

In The Shaolin Monastery (2008), Meir Shahar argues that Sun Wukong influenced a legend about the origins of the Shaolin staff method. In the story, bandits besiege the monastery during the Red Turban Rebellion of the Yuan dynasty, but a kitchen worker drives them away using a fire poker as a staff. He then leaps into a furnace and transforms into a giant figure. The monks later discover that the worker was the monastery's guardian deity, Vajrapani, in disguise. Shahar notes parallels between this legend and Sun Wukong, including the furnace transformation, the use of a staff weapon, and the ability to grow to enormous size.

=== Namesakes ===
- The Chinese DAMPE satellite is nicknamed after Wu Kong. The name could be understood as "understand the void" literally, relates to the undiscovered dark matter.
- China has contributed Sun Wukong's name to be used as a typhoon name, which has been used in 2000, 2006, 2012, 2018, and 2024.

=== In popular culture ===
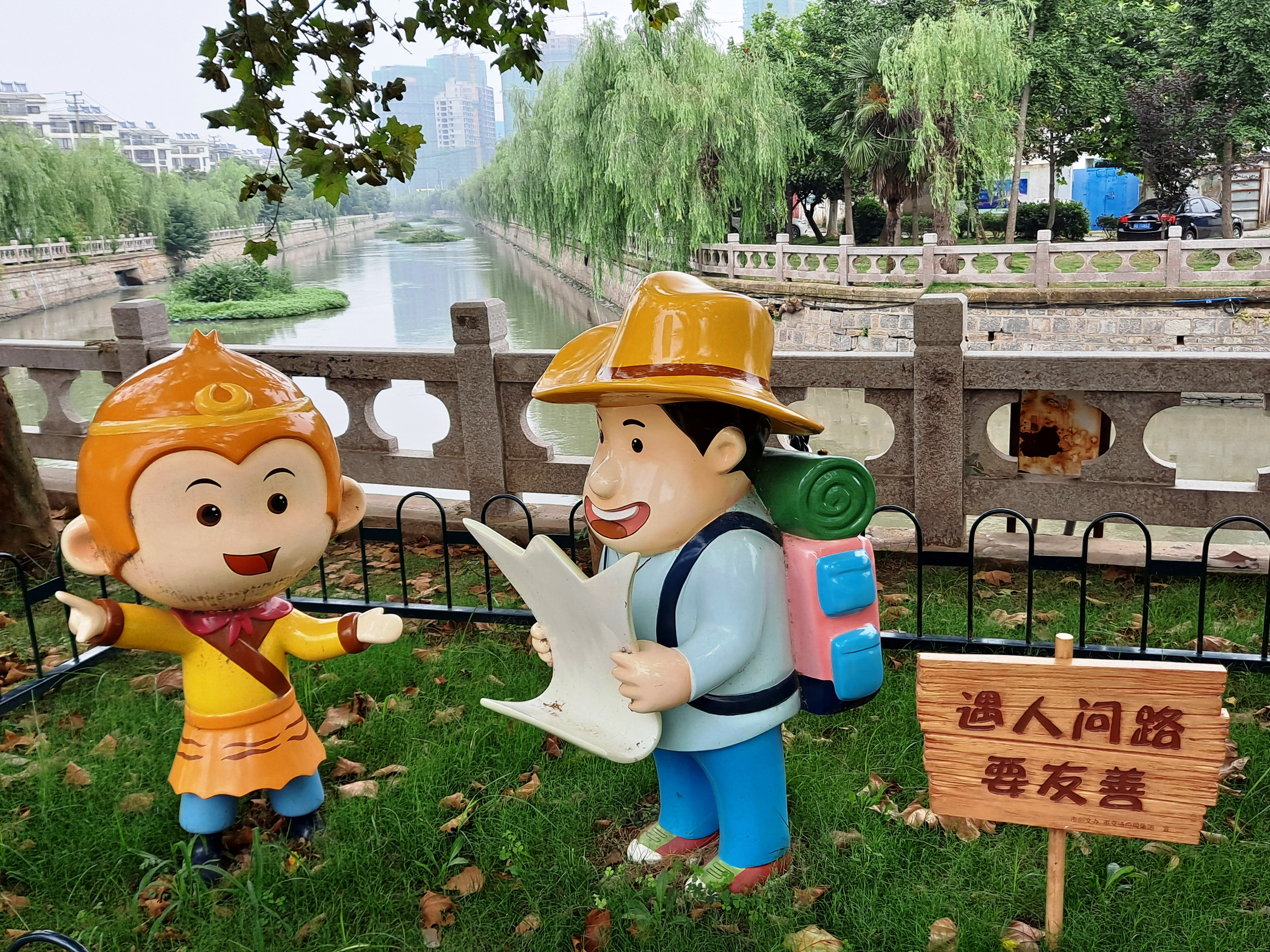
Cartoon-style models of Monkey King on the streets of Lianyungang

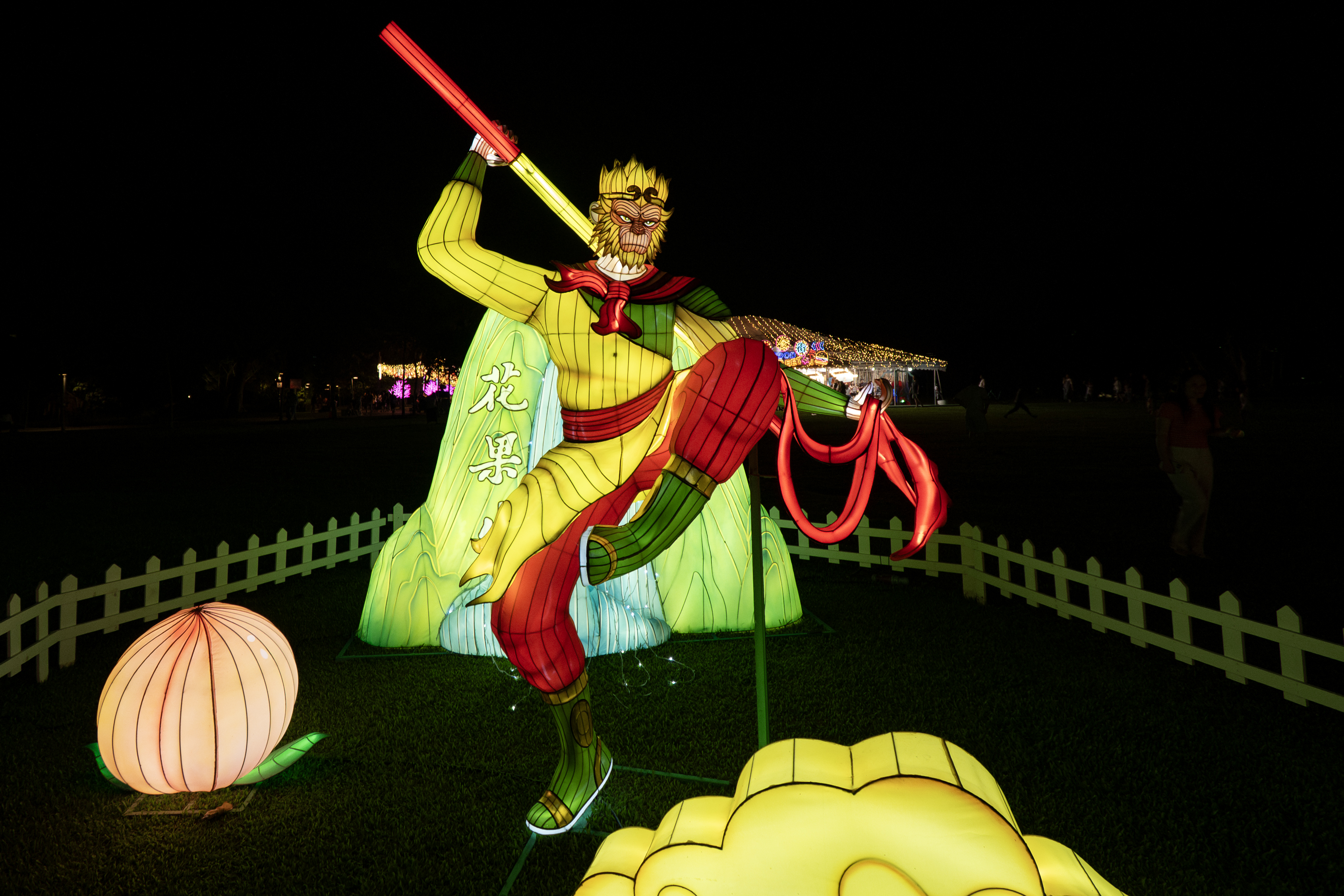
Sun Wukong lantern display during a Mid-Autumn Festival event in Singapore.

Sun Wukong has been the subject of myriad popular media including movies, television, books and music. Some of the notable ones are highlighted below.

- Journey to the West is one of the most well-known TV series in mainland China and is broadcast by TV stations every winter and summer vacation. In the series, Sun Wukong is played by Liu Xiao Ling Tong,
- Shadow puppetry animation, Sun Wukong Battles Baigujing Three Times (Chinese: 孙悟空三打白骨精), tells one of the classic stories from Journey to the West. In this story, Sun Wukong is expelled by his master, Tang Sanzang (Chinese: 唐三藏, pinyin: Táng Sānzàng), after killing Baigujing (Chinese: 白骨精, pinyin: Bái gǔ Jīng), whom his master mistakenly believes to be an innocent person. Angered, Wukong leaves. In the end, Tang Sanzang realizes the truth—that Wukong killed a demon, not an innocent person—and the two are reconciled.
- A Chinese Odyssey is a fantasy comedy film made in Hong Kong 1995. Sun Wukong, portrayed by Stephen Chow, is remembered by a wide Chinese-speaking audience for the film's comedic elements and the profound meaning behind its abstract presentation.
- Journey to the West: Legends of the Monkey King consists of 52 episodes, each no longer than 25 minutes. It is regarded as a classic of Chinese animation from the 1990s.
- Martial Arts Superstar Donnie Yen plays Sun Wukong in the 2014 movie The Monkey King; despite mixed reviews surrounding the film's pacing, it was a huge box office success grossing almost US$200 million worldwide, doubling its budget with Donnie Yen's performance being lauded.
- The character of Monkey in Netflix's The New Legends of Monkey (2018–2020), portrayed by Chai Hansen, is based on Journey to the West by Wu Cheng'en.
- The character of Son Goku in Dragon Ball is based on Sun Wukong, as attested by his monkey tail, staff, flying cloud, and name (which is simply the Japanese reading of the same name in Chinese: 孫悟空).
- The manga-anime series Saiyuki's Sun Wukong counterpart also uses the Japanese reading Son Goku.
- The Four-Tailed Beast, also known as Seiten Taisei Son Gokū (斉天大聖孫悟空) in the manga-anime series Naruto: Shippuden is directly based on Sun Wukong and is directly referred to as Monkey King in the manga.
- The character of Mushra in the Toei Animation anime Shinzo is based on Sun Wukong, retaining the character's golden headband and telescoping staff.
- The character of Monkey in the 1978 Japanese television series Monkey is based on Sun Wukong.
- The character of Kongo in Monkey Magic is based on Sun Wukong.
- In the webtoon The God of High School and its derivative media, the protagonist Mori Jin is based on the God Sun Wukong.
- The character Sun Wukong in RWBY is based on the lore; but instead of using his hair to make the clones, he can make the clones using RWBY's magic system.
- The character of Sun Wukong, explicitly said to be the trickster of legend, plays a major role in the DreamWorks animated series Kung Fu Panda: The Paws of Destiny.
- The main character of Starzinger, Jan Kugo, is based on the Monkey King. They wear a golden band around their heads that is controlled by the princess, and which may induce agony as well. The golden band is also his primary weapon, a long javelin that decreases in size and shape. In the English-dubbed version featured in the Force Five TV series, he is renamed Jesse Dart, after D'Artagnan of The Three Musketeers.
- Marvel Comics features their own version of Sun Wukong. This version was a crime lord, styled after the famed character, who steals the original staff and encounters the spirit of the real Monkey King. After being punished by being sent to hell, he escapes and decides to devote himself to fighting evil as repentance.
- DC Comics' Sun Wukong has a human son named Marcus Sun who discovers his parentage and takes up the superhero codename of Monkey Prince.
- The 2020 cartoon Lego Monkie Kid depicts a new generation of the classic tale where a delivery boy named MK is chosen to be Sun Wukong's successor, calling himself the "Monkie Kid".
- In 2021, Sunrise Inc. has released an animation series SD Gundam World Heroes, under the SD Gundam franchise which features Sun Wukong as a protagonist along other mythical characters in the novels.
- The storyline of the 2023 film The Monkey King is derived from the origin stories of the Monkey King, ending with his release from imprisonment.
- The Monkey King is reimagined as a major character in Gene Luen Yang's graphic novel American Born Chinese and its adaptation on Disney+ (played by Daniel Wu).
- The novel Omniscient Reader's Viewpoint features their own version of Sun Wukong. He is a constellation that goes by the modifier of Prisoner of the Golden Headband, Great Sage, Heaven's Equal.
- The animated film Nobody follows a group of low-level spirits who pretend to be Sun Wukong's group. Wukong makes a small but pivotal appearance at the end of the film.
- The 2025 horror film Sinners briefly features Sun Wukong in a cameo during the film's dance sequence, when the cultural heritage of those present are manifested, with him representing a Chinese American couple.

=== Video games ===
- In Pokémon Diamond and Pearl, the design of the starter Pokémon Infernape is inspired by the appearance of Sun Wukong.
- Sun Wukong appears as a playable character in Koei Tecmo's Warriors Orochi franchise, starting with Warriors Orochi 2.
- In Dota 2, there is a hero called Monkey King. His backstory also roughly follows the story of Journey to the West.
- In Heroes of the Storm, a skin for the character Samuro is based on Sun Wukong.
- Enslaved: Odyssey to the West's plot and protagonist, Monkey, are loosely based on Journey to the West and Wukong, respectively.
- League of Legends has a champion based on and named after Wukong.
- In Guild Wars 2, the items Mini Monkey King and Endless Monkey King Tonic are based on Sun Wukong.
- Warframe features a playable character named Wukong, who is modelled on the Monkey King and possesses abilities based on those described in Journey to the West.
- In Mobile Legends: Bang Bang, the character Sun is based on Wukong.
- In Honor of Kings, the character Sun Wukong is based on the Monkey King.
- Sun Wukong is one of twelve mythological heroes that civilizations can summon in Civilization VI's Heroes and Legends Mode.
- The player plays as a reincarnation of Sun Wukong with the goal of collecting his 6 relics in the action role-playing video game Black Myth: Wukong.
- In the Kemono Friends 3 app, Sun Wukong appears as a playable character.
- In Ravenswatch, Sun Wukong appears as an unlockable character. His backstory references characters from Journey to the West.
- In Smite, Sun Wukong is a playable God, part of the Chinese pantheon in the mythologic MOBA.

=== Music ===
- Sun Wukong is the inspiration and titular character of K-Pop boy group Seventeen's song "Super" (손오공).
- Journey to the West was adapted into the stage musical Monkey as a collaboration between Damon Albarn and Jamie Hewlett (comprising the band Gorillaz) and Chinese actor and director Chen Shi-Zheng. Originally staged as an opera, Albarn released a Gorillaz-style album Monkey which takes its name from Sun Wukong.
- San Francisco Opera premiered The Monkey King, an opera by composer Huang Ruo and librettist David Henry Hwang on 14 November 2025.

=== Poetry ===
- Hungarian poet Lőrinc Szabó wrote his poem Szun Vu Kung lázadása ("Sun Wukong's mutiny") about Sun Wukong.

== See also ==
- Birthday of the Monkey God
- Dafo Temple (Zhangye) – contains a Qing dynasty mural featuring Monkey and other characters from the novel)
- Hanuman, a Hindu deity
- Jambavan, king of the bears in Hinduism
- List of media adaptations of Journey to the West
- Monkey King Festival
- Pha Trelgen Changchup Sempa
- Sun Wukong Fossa, a Fossa on Pluto, named as a nod for the Monkey King's journey in the Chinese Underworld, the realm of King Yama.
