= Reich Richter Pärt =

Interdisciplinary performance artworks

Reich Richter Pärt was a duo of 2019 live immersive interdisciplinary performance pieces wthat combined paintings, new musical compositions, and film. The work in its original form was site-specific as commissioned for and staged under the guidance of curators Hans Ulrich Obrist and Alex Poots at the Shed in an architectural setting that is possessed with the ability to morph according to the work being exhibited and or performed therein. The work as titled consisted of a pair of artistic collaborations: first between the German artist Gerhard Richter and the Estonian composer Arvo Pärt (which built upon a concept originally developed by Obrist and Poots for the Manchester International Festival), and secondly between Richter and the American composer Steve Reich. The second part of the work also featured a collaboration between Richter and the filmmaker Corinna Belz, a film based on the artist's 2012 book Patterns.
