= Street Dreams =

Street Dreams may refer to:

- Street Dreams (film), a 2009 American film
- Street Dreams (Fabolous album), 2003
- Street Dreams (Lyle Mays album), 1988
- Street Dreams (Chet Atkins album), 1986
- "Street Dreams" (song), a song by Nas
- "Street Dreams", a song by Hollywood Undead from the 2011 album American Tragedy

== See also ==
- Sweet Dreams (disambiguation)
- Dream Street, an American pop boy band
