= Factory International =

Theatre in Manchester, England

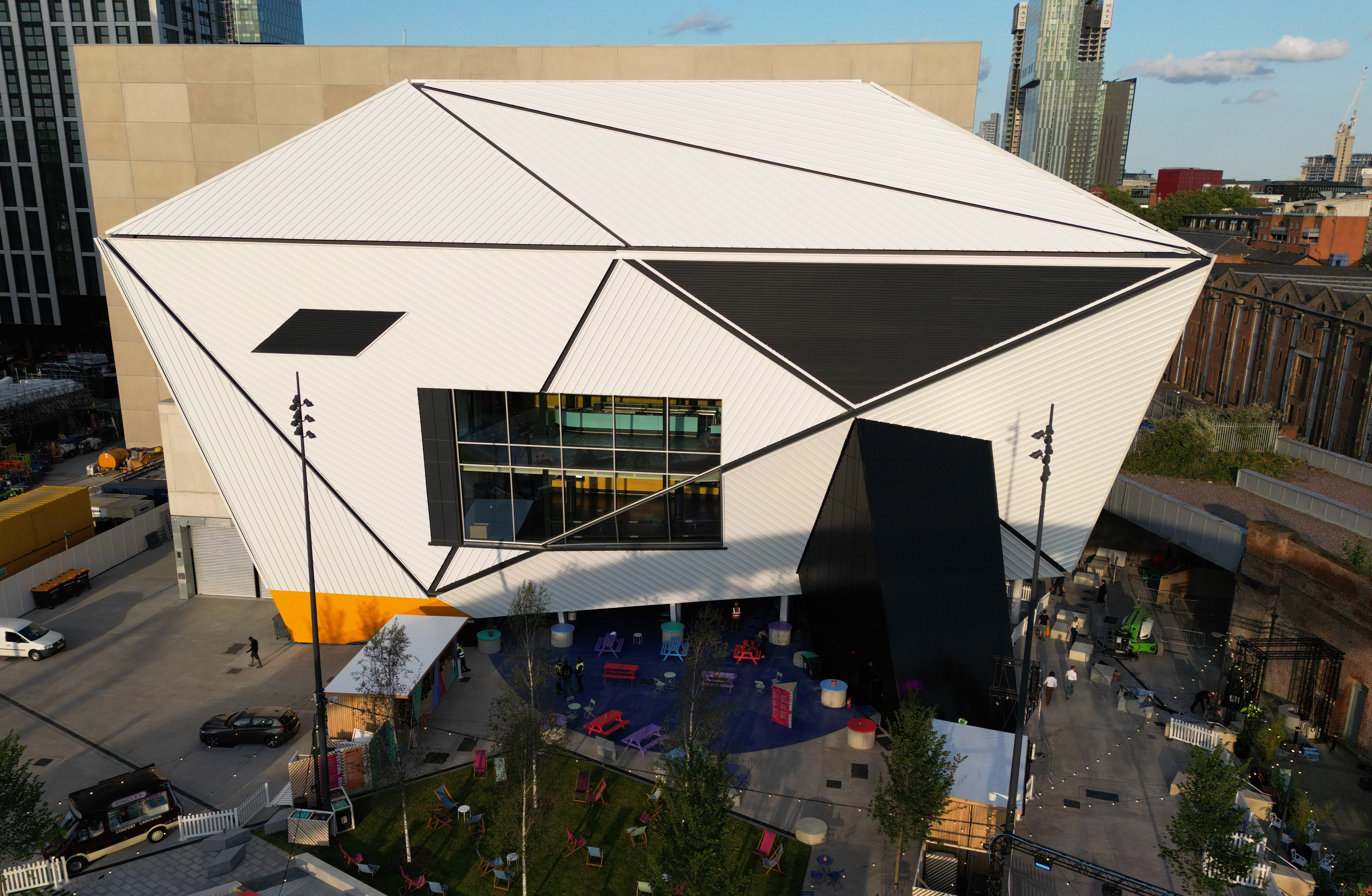
- Aviva Studios, Home of Factory International
- Location: Factory International; Water Street; Manchester; M3 4JQ England
- Coordinates: 53°28′40.1844″N 02°15′27.2988″W
- Owner: Manchester Quays Ltd (MQL)
- Operator: Manchester International Festival via the project's board
- Capacity: Detailed venue capacity: Andrew Law Theatre: 1,554; Warehouse: 4,500
- Acreage: 13,300 m^{2} (143,000 sq ft)
- Public transit: Deansgate station / Salford Central station / Deansgate-Castlefield Metrolink

Construction
- Groundbreaking: January 2019
- Opened: June 2023
- Cost: £185.79 million
- Architects: Office for Metropolitan Architecture, lead architect Ellen van Loon
- Project manager: Manchester City Council
- Structural engineers: BuroHappold Engineering also civil engineer services and BREEAM
- Services engineers: BDP (building services) Charcoalblue (theatre); Level Acoustics (acoustic)

Tenant
- Manchester International Festival

Website
- factoryinternational.org

Factory International runs Manchester International Festival and operates Aviva Studios, a cultural space in Manchester, England.

== History ==
Factory International builds on the legacy of Manchester International Festival (MIF), which focusses on performing arts, visual arts and popular culture. The festival is staged across Greater Manchester – from theatres, galleries and concert halls to railway depots, churches and car parks.

Plans to build a new cultural building in Manchester were announced in December 2014 by then Chancellor, George Osborne, who pledged a £78 million investment as part of the Northern Powerhouse programme. The project was backed by Manchester City Council, which stated that the venue would "play an integral part in helping Manchester and the north of England provide a genuine cultural counterbalance to London".

In January 2017, MIF were named as the operators of the new cultural venue, tasked with developing its ideas and programme.

The Government announced that, from 1 April 2018, they would provide Arts Council England with an additional £9 million per annum to offer revenue support to the project.

In recognition of the new balance of its activity, in September 2022, the whole organisation re-branded as Factory International, though it will continue to present MIF every two years.

In 2022, the organisation was awarded a National Portfolio Award from Arts Council England of approximately £9.9 million per year. Key support also comes from Manchester City Council and a range of sponsors and partners.

In 2023, it was announced that the building would be called Aviva Studios after insurance company Aviva secured the naming rights for £35 million, making it one of the UK's biggest cultural corporate sponsorship deals.

== Aviva Studios ==
Aviva Studios, programmed and operated by Factory International, was designed by the international practice Office for Metropolitan Architecture (OMA), founded by Rem Koolhaas and is OMA's first major, permanent cultural building in the United Kingdom.

The internal spaces of Aviva Studios cover approximately 13,300 m^{2} (143,000 sq ft), with adaptability designed to enable the commissioning of large scale and intimate work across different art forms, including dance, theatre, music, opera, visual arts, popular culture and digital work, plus major exhibitions and concerts.

Aviva Studios was constructed on the former site of Granada Studios, where Coronation Street and other TV programmes were filmed and is located within St John's, being developed by Allied London, which purchased the site with Manchester City Council. The building's development coincides with that of the adjacent Science and Industry Museum. Aviva Studios is next to the River Irwell, close to other city centre cultural sites, including the People's History Museum, John Rylands Library, the Opera House, HOME and the Royal Exchange Theatre.

=== Design ===
The building covers 13,300 m^{2} (143,000 sq ft), and comprises three main internal spaces: the ground floor, warehouse and auditorium, with further spaces inside and outside of the building. The warehouse has a capacity of up to 5,000 and the auditorium up to 1,600 seated. The warehouse and auditorium can present events simultaneously, and the warehouse also has the ability to be divided into two spaces by an acoustic wall. Both spaces can also be combined to create and present different types and scales of events. Two public squares on the north and west sides of the building also make up the Factory International site and the scheme includes the restoration and reuse of the northern brick arched portion of the Grade II-listed Colonnaded Railway Viaduct.

== Programming ==
=== Pre-Factory events ===
In the run up to Factory International, MIF commissioned and presented a series of artists and events. Pre-Factory commissions have included Akram Khan's Giselle; Thomas Ostermeier's Returning to Reims; Available Light by composer John Adams, choreographer Lucinda Childs and architect Frank Gehry; Everything that happened and would happen by German composer and artist Heiner Goebbels; Special Edition, a series of musical offerings presented with The Warehouse Project; Invisible Cities, a co-commission between MIF, 59 Productions and Rambert; Ivo Van Hove's The Fountainhead; Rafael Lozano-Hemmer's Atmospheric Memory; and to the Moon by Laurie Anderson.

=== Virtual Factory ===
In July 2020, MIF launched Virtual Factory, a series of online commissions by artists, inspired by Factory International's new building, its architecture and the history of the site. The first commission was Your Progress Will Be Saved, by the artist avatar LaTurbo Avedon, in which Factory International was built in the global gaming platform Fortnite Creative. Other artists commissioned for Virtual Factory included Tai Shani and Robert Yang. The final commission for the Virtual Factory platform was by artist and filmmaker Jenn Nkiru.

=== 2023 - Opening Programme ===
Factory International's opening programme included Free Your Mind, an immersive Matrix films-themed dance, music and visual effects experience with a creative team including composer Michael 'Mikey J' Asante MBE and choreographer Kenrick 'H2O' Sandy MBE (founders of hip-hop dance company Boy Blue), artist and stage designer Es Devlin, playwright and poet Sabrina Mahfouz and director Danny Boyle. The programme also included You Me and the Balloons, the largest ever show by artist Yayoi Kusama, and The Welcome, a series of events and performances curated by the people of Greater Manchester.

=== 2024 ===
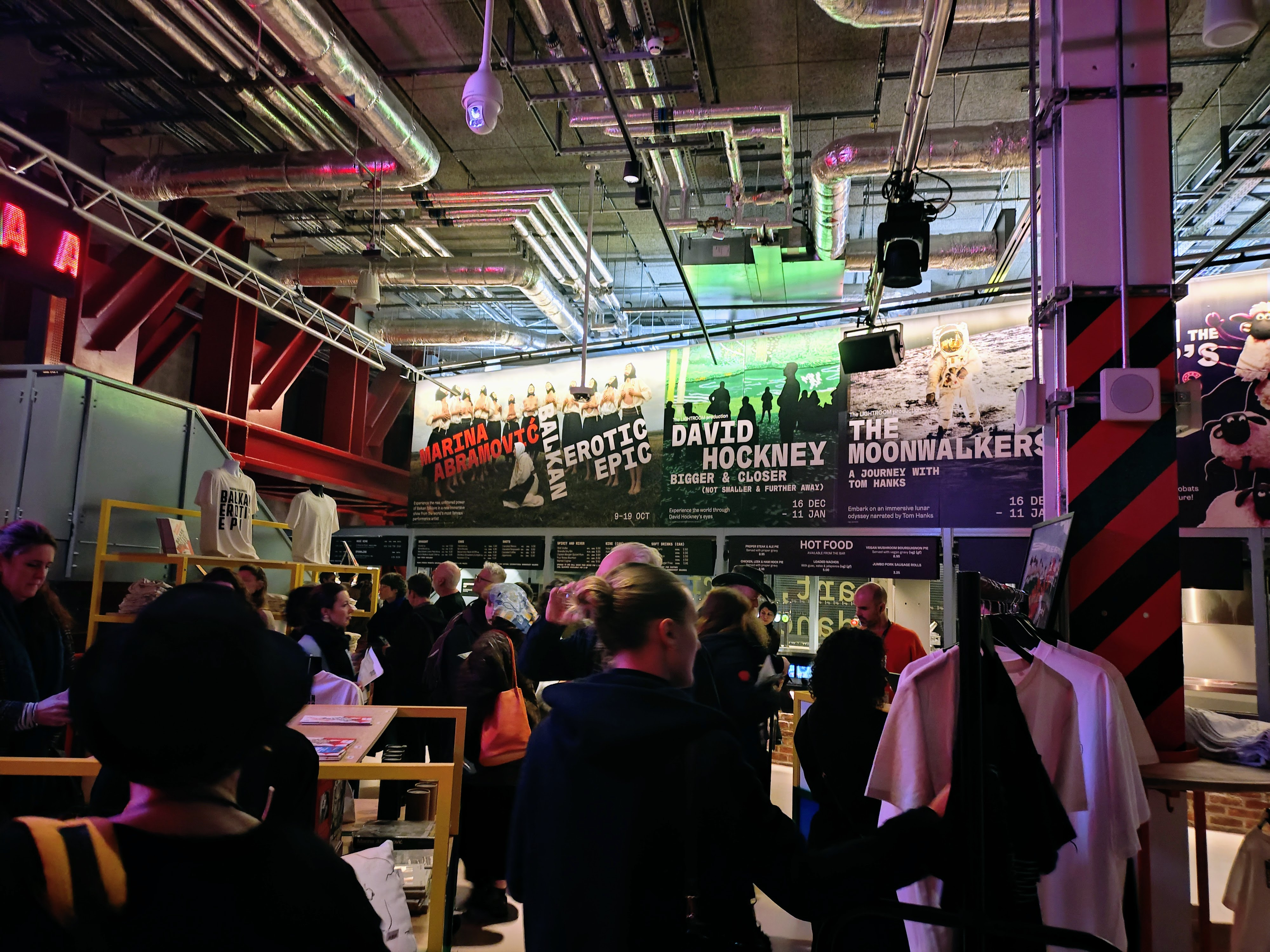
The Lobby of the Factory International, 2025

Summer 2024 saw the launch of Summer Factory, a series of cultural and food events at the venue, including the audiovisual installation Sweet Dreams in the Aviva Warehouse.

=== 2025 ===
Balkan Erotic Epic is a durational performance artwork by Marina Abramović, presented at Aviva Studios in Manchester from 9 to 19 October 2025. The piece builds on Abramović's 2005 multi-channel video installation of the same name, expanding its exploration of Balkan folklore, erotic ritual, and collective mythology into a large-scale live performance. The four-hour event featured more than seventy performers, including dancers, musicians, and singers, and allowed audiences to move freely through a sequence of thirteen immersive scenes. Incorporating elements such as Fertility Rite, Massaging the Breast, and Scaring the Gods, the work re-examines the connection between sexuality, spirituality, and the body in ritual traditions.

== International work ==
Factory International collaborates with venues, festivals and companies across the world to commission artists together, working with local, national and international partners and co-producers.

As MIF, Factory International was part of an Arts Council England initiative with The Public Theater in New York – to promote artists and companies based in England to a global audience. Under the Radar Festival supported artists involved in theatre and performance.

== Training and employment ==
Factory International delivers a skills, engagement and training programme under the banner the Factory Academy. Since launching in 2018, the Factory Academy has delivered several projects. In January 2019, seven local people who were not in education or employment completed a seven-month traineeship with MIF in roles such as IT, digital, production, ticketing and development. In January 2020, five young people were employed as Creative Venue Technician apprentices with Consortium members.

== Timescale ==
The timeframe of the project contains the following key milestones:

- July 2015 – issue of the contract for design services
- Mid-November 2015 – design team appointments
- January 2017 – planning application submission
- February 2017 to June 2023 – construction
- June 2023 – The venue presents its first events for MIF23, enabling visitors to preview the building
- October 2023 – official opening of the building

Funding for the building of Factory International
Source of funding	Amount £m (% of all funding)
Exchequer via ACE grant	78.5(42.25%)
Manchester City Council	50.6(27.24%)
Cultural Capital Kickstart Fund	21(11.3%)
ACE Lottery grant	7(3.7%)
Fundraising	25(13.4%)

== See also ==
- Allied London
- Manchester City Council
- Manchester International Festival
- Museum of Science and Industry (Manchester)
- Office for Metropolitan Architecture
- Rem Koolhaas
- St John's Quarter

== Notes ==
^{Note 1} The original timeline was as follows:
- May 2016 – planning application submission
- January 2017 to December 2018 – construction
- January 2019 to June 2019 – commissioning of facilities and test events
- July 2019 – opening ceremony

^{Note 2} The revised timeline was as follows:
- End of 2019 – opening ceremony

Reference to Note 1

- Manchester City Council (29 July 2015). Executive meeting: 16. The Factory Manchester: Project Delivery (Report). Manchester City Council. pp. 222–224. point 5.0. Pdf.

Reference to Note 2

- Manchester City Council (July 2016). Executive meeting: 16. Updated Draft St Johns Strategic regeneration framework and Factory Manchester (Report). Manchester City Council. p. 15. Pdf.
