= List of awards and nominations received by South Pacific (musical) =

South Pacific is considered to be one of the greatest Broadway musicals. The musical premiered in 1949 and won the Pulitzer Prize for Drama in 1950. The show was a critical and box office hit and has since enjoyed many successful revivals and tours, also spawning a 1958 film and other adaptations.

The original Broadway production won ten Tony Awards, including Best Musical, Best Score and Best Libretto, and it is the only musical production ever to have won all four Tony Awards for acting. The 2008 Broadway revival was a strong success, winning numerous theatre awards. Its seven Tonys included Best Musical Revival. Sher and Szot also won Tonys, and the production won in all four design categories, also receiving nominations for choreography and for the performances of O'Hara, Burstein and Ables Sayre. It also won five Drama Desk Awards, including Outstanding Musical Revival. The late Robert Russell Bennett was recognized that season for "his historic contribution to American musical theatre in the field of orchestrations, as represented on Broadway this season by Rodgers and Hammerstein’s South Pacific."

== Awards and nominations ==
=== Original Broadway production ===
Year	Award Ceremony	Category	Nominee	Result
1950	Pulitzer Prize	Drama		Won
1950	Tony Award	Best Musical		Won
1950	Tony Award	Best Performance by a Leading Actor in a Musical	Ezio Pinza	Won
1950	Tony Award	Best Performance by a Leading Actress in a Musical	Mary Martin	Won
1950	Tony Award	Best Performance by a Featured Actor in a Musical	Myron McCormick	Won
1950	Tony Award	Best Performance by a Featured Actress in a Musical	Juanita Hall	Won
1950	Tony Award	Best Producer	Oscar Hammerstein II, Richard Rodgers, Leland Hayward and Joshua Logan	Won
1950	Tony Award	Best Director	Joshua Logan	Won
1950	Tony Award	Best Libretto	Oscar Hammerstein II	Won
1950	Tony Award	Best Original Score	Richard Rodgers	Won
1949	Tony Award	Best Scenic Design	Jo Mielziner	Won
1949	New York Drama Critics' Circle Awards	Best Musical	Richard Rodgers, Oscar Hammerstein II and Joshua Logan	Won

=== 2001 London revival ===
Year	Award Ceremony	Category	Nominee	Result
2001	Laurence Olivier Award	Best Actor in a Musical	Philip Quast	Won

=== 2001 Television film ===
Year	Award Ceremony	Category	Nominee	Result
2001	Emmy Award	Outstanding Music Direction	Paul Bogaev	Nominated
2001	Emmy Award	Outstanding Single Camera Sound Mixing for a Miniseries or a Movie	Guntis Sics, Rick Ash, Joe Earle and Joel Moss	Nominated

=== 2008 Broadway revival ===
Year	Award Ceremony	Category	Nominee	Result
2008	Drama Desk Award	Outstanding Revival of a Musical		Won
2008	Drama Desk Award	Outstanding Actor in a Musical	Paulo Szot	Won
2008	Drama Desk Award	Outstanding Actress in a Musical	Kelli O'Hara	Nominated
2008	Drama Desk Award	Outstanding Featured Actor in a Musical	Danny Burstein	Nominated
2008	Drama Desk Award	Outstanding Director	Bartlett Sher	Won
2008	Drama Desk Award	Outstanding Set Design	Michael Yeargan	Won
2008	Drama Desk Award	Outstanding Sound Design	Scott Lehrer	Won
2008	Drama Desk Award	Outstanding Lighting Design	Donald Holder	Nominated
2008	Outer Critics Circle Award	Outstanding Revival of a Musical		Won
2008	Outer Critics Circle Award	Outstanding Actor in a Musical	Paulo Szot	Won
2008	Outer Critics Circle Award	Outstanding Actress in a Musical	Kelli O'Hara	Nominated
2008	Outer Critics Circle Award	Outstanding Featured Actor in a Musical	Danny Burstein	Won
2008	Outer Critics Circle Award	Outstanding Director of a Musical	Bartlett Sher	Won
2008	Outer Critics Circle Award	Outstanding Choreographer	Christopher Gattelli	Nominated
2008	Outer Critics Circle Award	Outstanding Set Design	Michael Yeargan	Nominated
2008	Outer Critics Circle Award	Outstanding Costume Design	Catherine Zuber	Won
2008	Tony Award	Best Revival of a Musical		Won
2008	Tony Award	Best Direction of a Musical	Bartlett Sher	Won
2008	Tony Award	Best Performance by a Leading Actor in a Musical	Paulo Szot	Won
2008	Tony Award	Best Performance by a Leading Actress in a Musical	Kelli O'Hara	Nominated
2008	Tony Award	Best Performance by a Featured Actor in a Musical	Danny Burstein	Nominated
2008	Tony Award	Best Performance by a Featured Actress in a Musical	Loretta Ables Sayre	Nominated
2008	Tony Award	Best Choreography	Christopher Gattelli	Nominated
2008	Tony Award	Best Scenic Design	Michael Yeargan	Won
2008	Tony Award	Best Costume Design	Catherine Zuber	Won
2008	Tony Award	Best Lighting Design	Donald Holder	Won
2008	Tony Award	Best Sound Design	Scott Lehrer	Won

=== 2011 London revival ===
Year	Award	Category	Nominee	Result
2012	Laurence Olivier Award	Best Musical Revival		Nominated
2012	Laurence Olivier Award	Best Actor in a Musical	Paulo Szot	Nominated
2012	Laurence Olivier Award	Best Costume Design	Catherine Zuber	Nominated
