= Sweet Dream =

Sweet Dream may refer to:

- "Sweet Dream" (single album)
- "Sweet Dream" (Alessia Cara song)
- "Sweet Dream" (Jethro Tull song)
- "Sweet Dream" (Universe Cowards song)
- "Sweet Dream", by Greg Page from his 1998 debut album
- "Sweet Dream", an English language version of the song "Sweet Sweet Sweet" by the Japanese pop group Dreams Come True, from their album The Swinging Star

== See also ==
- Sweet Dreams (disambiguation)
