= Alex Poots =

Artistic director

- Born: Alexander Moinet Poots; Edinburgh, Scotland
- Education: City University London
- Title: Artistic Director and Chief Executive, The Shed (arts center)
- Spouse: Kathryn Spellman-Poots
- Children: 1 daughter and 1 son

Alexander Moinet Poots CBE is an arts and cultural leader who has built major new organizations from the ground up and who has inspired established organizations to reshape their familiar approaches into more innovative, popular and culturally democratic programs. In 2015 he was appointed the founding artistic director and chief executive of The Shed in New York City, a pioneering cultural institution that opened in 2019. Prior to this, Poots was the founding artistic director and chief executive of the Manchester International Festival (2005–2015) and the founding artistic director of New York's Park Avenue Armory (2012–2015), establishing a reputation for producing and presenting artist-led, inventive, interdisciplinary new works and programs.

== Early life and education ==
Poots was born in Edinburgh, Scotland, to a French mother and Irish father. He developed an early passion for music, particularly the trumpet and composition. He pursued this interest, earning a bachelor's degree in music from City University London. During his studies, he also contributed trumpet performances to The Blue Nile's album Hats and performed with Pulp at Glastonbury.

== Early career ==
From 1996 to 2003 Poots’s professional journey began at London's Barbican Centre, programming the ‘Inventing America’ season including James Brown, Alice Walker, La Monte Young, Ken Kesey, Gayle Ross and Max Roach, and Karlheinz Stockhausen’s ‘Elektronic’ including Aphex Twin. He later commissioned interdisciplinary productions for Tate Modern and Tate Britain, including the iconic collaborations between artist Steve McQueen and soprano Jessye Norman, Arvo Part, Anish Kapoor and Peter Sellars, and new work by PJ Harvey and Wolfgang Tillmans.

== Manchester International Festival (2005–2015) ==
In 2005, Poots was appointed the founding artistic director and chief executive of the Manchester International Festival (MIF). Under his leadership, MIF gained international acclaim for commissioning original, interdisciplinary works. Notable projects included Monkey: Journey to the West, a collaboration between Chen Shi-Zheng, Damon Albarn and Jamie Hewlett; The xx staged concert; The Life and Death of Marina Abramović, directed by Robert Wilson and featuring Willem Dafoe and Abramović; Abida Parveen with John Tavener and Werner Herzog; 'Massive Attack v Adam Curtis’; ‘Il Tempo del Postino,’ a time-based group show with Matthew Barney, Trisha Donnelly, Philippe Parreno, Koo Jeong A, Pierre Huyghe, Tacita Dean, Doug Aitken, Rirkrit Tiravanija; and Akram Khan, and Tamara Rojo’s Giselle with English National Ballet.

== Park Avenue Armory (2012–2015) ==
Simultaneously, Poots served as the founding artistic director at New York's Park Avenue Armory. His tenure was marked by the immersive exhibition; Douglas Gordon and Hélène Grimaud’s ‘tears become, streams become ...’; the FlexN dance production; Igor Levit and Marina Abramović’s ‘Goldberg’; Berlin Philharmonic, Simon Rattle and Peter Sellars’s St Matthew Passion; Kenneth Branagh’s immersive staging of Macbeth; and Tree of Codes with Paris Ballet, Wayne McGregor, Olafur Eliasson, and Jamie xx.

== The Shed (2015–Present) ==
In December 2014, Poots was appointed founding artistic director and chief executive of The Shed, the first purpose built arts center in Manhattan for over 50 years. Under his leadership, The Shed emerged as a dynamic center for innovative, interdisciplinary art, commissioning and presenting new works across and between various forms of creativity.

=== Notable commissions and programs ===
During Poots’s tenure, The Shed commissioned and premiered several significant productions.

- Soundtrack of America: Conceived by Steve McQueen and Quincy Jones, this concert series celebrated the global influence of African American music on contemporary culture.
- Norma Jeane Baker of Troy: A performance piece by poet Anne Carson, starring Ben Whishaw and Renée Fleming exploring the lives of Marilyn Monroe and Helen of Troy.
- Reich Richter Pärt: An immersive experience featuring newly commissioned works by painter Gerhard Richter with composers Steve Reich and Arvo Pärt.
- Björk’s Cornucopia: A month-long, theatrical concert residency.
- Open Call: A biennial commissioning program supporting emerging New York City-based visual and performing artists, providing them with resources and space to create new works.
- Help: a performance piece by acclaimed writer and poet Claudia Rankine.
- William Forsythe: A Quiet Evening of Dance, set to the sounds of breath and music.
- Tomás Saraceno: A major, sensory exhibition with spider webs, air and the cosmic web.
- Kagami: The world’s first mixed reality performance featuring Ryuichi Sakamoto.
- Sonic Sphere: The realization of Karlheinz Stockhausen’s spherical 3D concert hall featuring works by Steve Reich, Yaeji, The xx and Carl Craig.
- Here We Are: The world premiere of Stephen Sondheim’s final musical.
- Luna Luna: A showcase of carnival attractions and performances by visionary artists including Jean-Michel Basquiat, Sonia Delaunay, Keith Haring, David Hockney, Roy Lichtenstein, and a new score by André 3000, Nicholas Brittel, Jockstrap, and more.
- Diffuse Control: the world premiere of Beeple’s collaborative encounter with art and AI

=== North Star Studio (2024-Present) ===
In 2024, Poots established North Star Studio, a new production house, to develop new works, shows and formats. North Star Studio’s first show was LDN LAB, presented in 2025 as part of SXSW London and featuring work at the intersection of art and technology from Andy Warhol and Beeple, to Marina Abramović, Hans Ulrich Obrist and Glitch Collective, and Holly Herndon with Mat Dryhurst.

== Awards ==
- 2012: Diaghilev Award for The Life and Death of Marina Abramović
- 2015: CBE in the Queen's Birthday Honours of 2015 for services to the arts
- 2024: Honorary Doctorate for services to arts from Edinburgh Napier University

== Personal life ==
Poots is married to Dr. Kathryn Spellman-Poots, an American sociology professor and author at Columbia University. The couple have two children and live in New York City
