= Sweet Dreams =

Sweet Dreams may refer to:

== Film and television ==
=== Film ===
- Sweet Dreams (1971 film) or Okay Bill, an American film by John G. Avildsen
- Sweet Dreams (1981 film) (Sogni d'oro), a film directed by and starring Nanni Moretti
- Sweet Dreams (1985 film), a film based on the life of Patsy Cline
- Sweet Dreams (1996 film), a television film starring Tiffani-Amber Thiessen
- Sweet Dreams (2012 film), a documentary about a women's drumming troupe in Rwanda
- Sweet Dreams (2016 film), an Italian film directed by Marco Bellocchio
- Sweet Dreams (2023 film), a Dutch-Swedish film directed by Ena Sendijarević
- Sweet Dreams (2024 film), an American sports comedy-drama film
- Sweet Dreams (2025 film), an Indian film directed by Victor Mukherjee
- Strawberry Shortcake: The Sweet Dreams Movie, a 2006 animated film

=== Television ===
- Sweet Dreams (TV series), a 2018 Chinese romantic comedy series
- Sweet Dreams, a 2000–2008 Food Network program hosted by Gale Gand
- "Sweet Dreams" (Doctors), a 2004 episode
- "Sweet Dreams" (Frasier), a 1998 episode
- "Sweet Dreams" (Glee), a 2013 episode
- "Sweet Dreams" (Medium), a 2005 episode
- "Sweet Dreams" (Merlin), a 2009 episode
- "Sweet Dreams" (Roseanne), a 1989 episode

== Literature ==
- Sweet Dreams (Dennett book), a 2005 book by Daniel Dennett
- Sweet Dreams (novel), a 1973 novel by Michael Frayn
- Sweet Dreams (novel series), a 1981–1996 series of teen romance novels
- Sweet Dreams, a 2016 story collection by Sunny Leone

== Music ==
=== Performers ===
- Sweet Dreams (1970s band), a UK group that had a hit with a cover of ABBA's "Honey, Honey"
- Sweet Dreams (1980s band), a UK group in the 1983 Eurovision Song Contest

=== Albums ===
- Sweet Dreams (La Bouche album) or the title song (see below), 1995
- Sweet Dreams (Sword album), 1988
- Sweet Dreams (soundtrack), from the 1985 film
- Sweet Dreams (Are Made of This) (album), by Eurythmics, or the title song (see below), 1983
- Sweet Dreams: The Anthology, by Roy Buchanan, 1992
- Sweet Dreams, by BZN, 1993

=== Songs ===
- "Sweet Dreams" (Air Supply song), 1981
- "Sweet Dreams" (Alan Walker and Imanbek song), 2021
- "Sweet Dreams" (Beyoncé song), 2008
- "Sweet Dreams" (Don Gibson song), 1955; covered by Faron Young (1956), Patsy Cline (1963), and others
- "Sweet Dreams" (J-Hope song), 2025
- "Sweet Dreams" (Koe Wetzel song), 2024
- "Sweet Dreams" (La Bouche song), 1994
- "Sweet Dreams" (Vamps song), 2009
- "Sweet Dreams (Are Made of This)" by Eurythmics, 1983; covered by Swing ft. Dr. Alban (1995), Marilyn Manson (1995) and others
- "Sweet Dreams", by Børns from Blue Madonna, 2018
- "Sweet Dreams!", by Exo-CBX from Blooming Days, 2018
- "Sweet Dreams", by Holly Miranda from The Magician's Private Library, 2010
- "Sweet Dreams", by Joey Badass from Summer Knights, 2013
- "Sweet Dreams", by the Lightning Seeds from Cloudcuckooland, 1989
- "Sweet Dreams", by Lost Frequencies from Alive and Feeling Fine, 2019
- "Sweet Dreams", by Probot from Probot, 2004
- "Sweet Dreams", by Red Velvet from Cosmic, 2024
- "Sweet Dreams", by Split Enz from Second Thoughts, 1976
- "Sweet Dreams", by Tori Amos, a B-side of the single "Winter", 1992
- "Sweet Dreams", by Yes from Time and a Word, 1970

== Other uses ==
- Sweet Dreams (aircraft), a Super Sport Class racing airplane designed by George Pereira
- Sweet Dreams, a 2003 video game by Hanako Games
- Sweet Dreams (installation), a narrative-driven art installation by art collective Marshmallow Laser Feast.

== See also ==
- Sweet Dream (disambiguation)
