= Chumisa Dornford-May =

South African-British actress (born 2002/3)

- Born: 2002/2003; Cape Town, South Africa
- Education: Mountview Academy of Theatre Arts
- Years active: 2023–present
- Father: Mark Dornford-May

Chumisa Dornford-May (born 2002/2003) is a South African and British actress. Known for her work in musical theatre, she received a Laurence Olivier Award nomination.

== Early life ==
Dornford is the daughter of English theatre director Mark Dornford-May and South African opera performer Pauline Malefane. She attended Herschel Girls' School in Cape Town and trained as a classical singer from age 9. Offered a place at Edinburgh's St Mary's Music School, Dornford-May instead relocated to Chester in 2018, where she pursued A Levels in English literature, Music and Performing arts at Christleton High School and joined On The Mark Youth Theatre (OTMYT). She won the Elaine Paige scholarship to study at the Mountview Academy of Theatre Arts in London, graduating in 2023.

== Career ==
Upon graduating from drama school, Dornford-May made her West End debut in the ensemble of Andrew Lloyd Webber's Aspects of Love for its 2023 revival at the Lyric Theatre on Shaftesbury Avenue. Later in the year, she played the Mistress in Evita at the Curve in Leicester. She also understudied Martha Kirby in the titular role. For her performance, Dornford-May won a UK Theatre Award.

In early 2024, Dornford-May Dornford-May featured as Wednesday Addams in the London Palladium concert of The Addams Family with Ramin Karimloo and joined The Phantom of the Opera at His Majesty's Theatre on the West End, alternating as Christine Daaé with lead actress Lily Kerhoas. She then starred as Natasha Rostova in Natasha, Pierre and the Great Comet of 1812 for its London premiere at Donmar Warehouse. For her performance in the latter, Dornford-May was nominated for the Laurence Olivier Award for Best Actress in a Musical.

From April-June 2025, Dornford-May played the role of Fritz in Stephen Sondheim's Here We Are at the National Theatre.

From December 2025 – May 2026, Dornford-May played Cinderella in Jordan Fein's production of Into The Woods at the Bridge Theatre. In June it was confirmed that she would not be returning to the show upon its transfer to the Noël Coward Theatre.

From July 10 2026 Dornford-May made Her RSC debut in the role of Anya Im the Cherry Orchard in the Swan Theatre

== Stage ==
Year	Title	Role	Notes
2023	Aspects of Love	Ensemble (u/s Jenny)	Lyric Theatre, West End
2023–2024	Evita	Mistress (u/s Eva Peron)	Curve, Leicester
2024	The Addams Family	Wednesday Addams	London Palladium, West End
2024	The Phantom of the Opera	Christine Daaé (alternate)	His Majesty's Theatre, West End
2024–2025	Natasha, Pierre & The Great Comet of 1812	Natasha Rostova	Donmar Warehouse, London
2025	Here We Are	Fritz	National Theatre, London
2025-2026	Into the Woods	Cinderella	Bridge Theatre London
2026	The Cherry Orchard	Anya	Swan Theatre, Stratford Upon Avon

== Awards and nominations ==
Year	Award	Category	Work	Result	Ref.
2024	UK Theatre Awards	Best Supporting Performance (in a Play or a Musical)	Evita	Won	
2025	Laurence Olivier Awards	Best Actress in a Musical	Natasha, Pierre & The Great Comet of 1812	Nominated	
