= The Shed (arts center) =

Cultural center in New York City

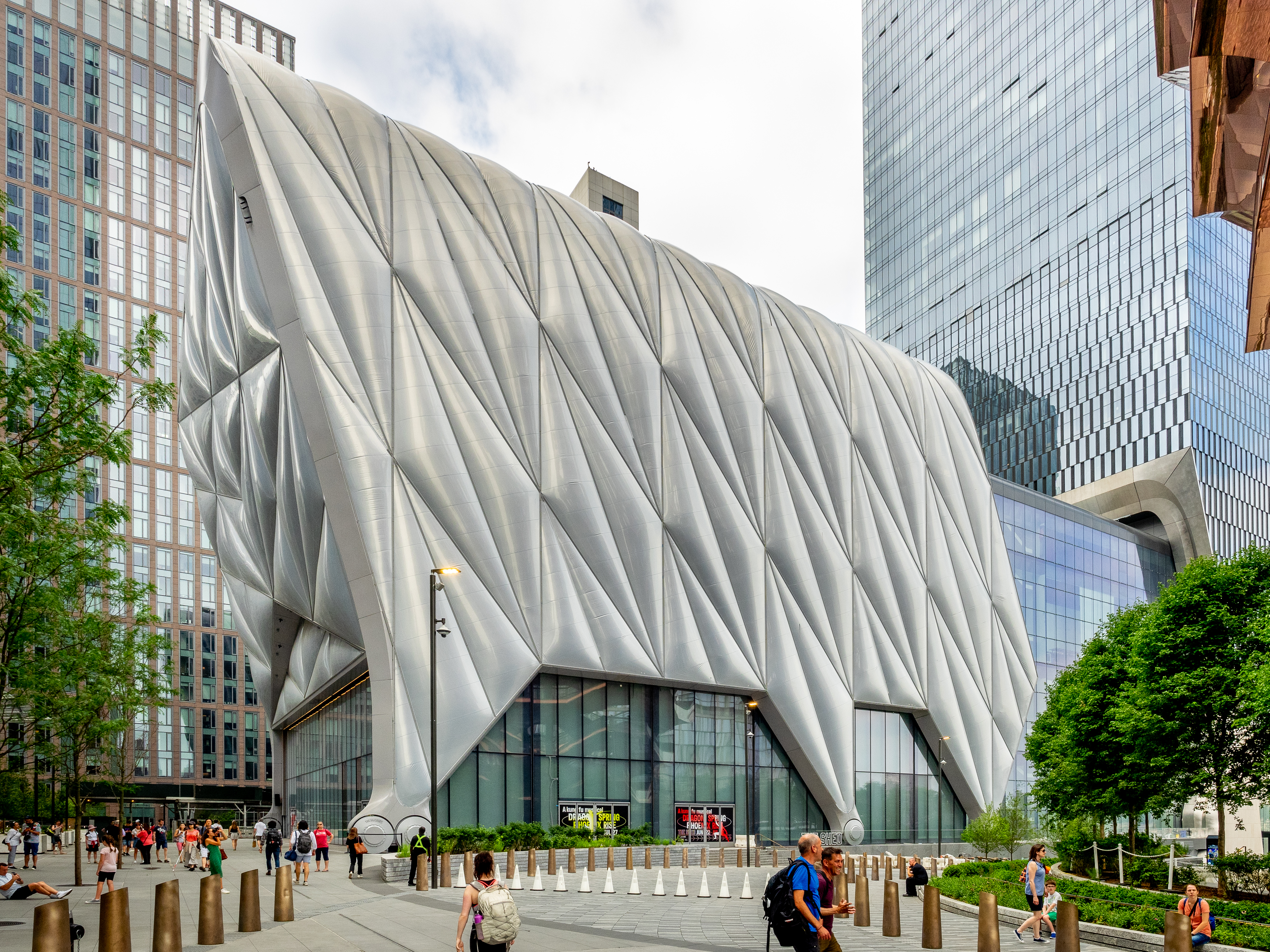
- July 2019 view
- Established: April 5, 2019
- Location: 545 W. 30th Street between 10th Avenue and 11th Avenue, New York, NY 10001
- Coordinates: 40.753328°N 74.002898°W
- Type: Cultural center
- Director: Alex Poots
- CEO: Meredith "Max" Hodges
- Public transit access: New York City Subway: trains at 34th Street-Hudson Yards; New York City Bus: M11 NB at 10th Avenue; M12 SB at 11th Avenue, NB at 12th Avenue; M34 SBS at 34th Street
- Website: theshed.org

The Shed (formerly known as Culture Shed and Hudson Yards Cultural Shed) is a cultural center in Hudson Yards, Manhattan, New York City. Opened on April 5, 2019, the Shed commissions, produces, and presents a wide range of activities in performing arts, visual arts, and pop culture.

The Shed is located in the Bloomberg Building, adjacent to the northern leg of the High Line elevated park, near the Chelsea gallery district. It is attached to 15 Hudson Yards, a skyscraper within the Hudson Yards real estate development, although the Shed itself is located on city-owned land. The cultural center is maintained by an independent nonprofit cultural organization of the same name. The Shed's CEO is Meredith "Max" Hodges and the Artistic Director is Alex Poots. The Chairman of the Board of Directors is Jonathan Tisch, who succeeded founding Chairman Daniel Doctoroff in 2022.

Construction on the Shed started in 2015, using a design from lead architect Diller Scofidio + Renfro and collaborating architect Rockwell Group. Structural engineering, the facade, and kinetic design was provided by Thornton Tomasetti. Hardesty & Hanover was the mechanization consultant. The Shed features several architectural features, including a retractable shell that creates a space, named The McCourt, for large-scale performances, installations and events; a 500-seat theater; and two levels of exhibition space. The plans for the cultural center have drawn praise from numerous media outlets and art institutions. It was initially criticized by the surrounding community, but as construction progressed, media reviews of the Shed have leaned more positive.

== History ==
=== Rezoning ===
In January 2005, the New York City Council approved the rezoning of about 60 blocks from 28th to 43rd Streets; in 2009, after a proposal for a stadium failed to win state approval, the West Side Yard was similarly rezoned. As rezoned, the Hudson Yards area will have 25.8 million square feet (2,400,000 m^{2}) of Class A office space, 20,000 housing units, 2 million square feet (190,000 m^{2}) of hotel space, 750-seat public school, 1 million square feet (93,000 m^{2}) of retail and more than 20 acres (8.1 ha) of public open space, which includes building a subway extension of the 7 train to help encourage development of the Hudson Yards area.

In May 2010, the Metropolitan Transportation Authority (MTA) leased the air rights over the rail yard for 99 years, at a price of US$1 billion to a joint venture of Related Companies and Oxford Properties Group, which built a platform above both the eastern and western portions of the yard on which to construct the buildings, including what was then known as the Culture Shed.

In April 2013, the Related/Oxford joint venture obtained a $475 million construction loan from parties including Barry Sternlicht's Starwood Property Group and luxury retailer Coach. The financing deal was unique in several aspects, including the fact that it included a construction mezzanine loan, that Coach was a lender on both the debt and equity sides, and that the MTA helped create the "severable lease" structure that allowed for the loans.

=== Funding and land ownership ===
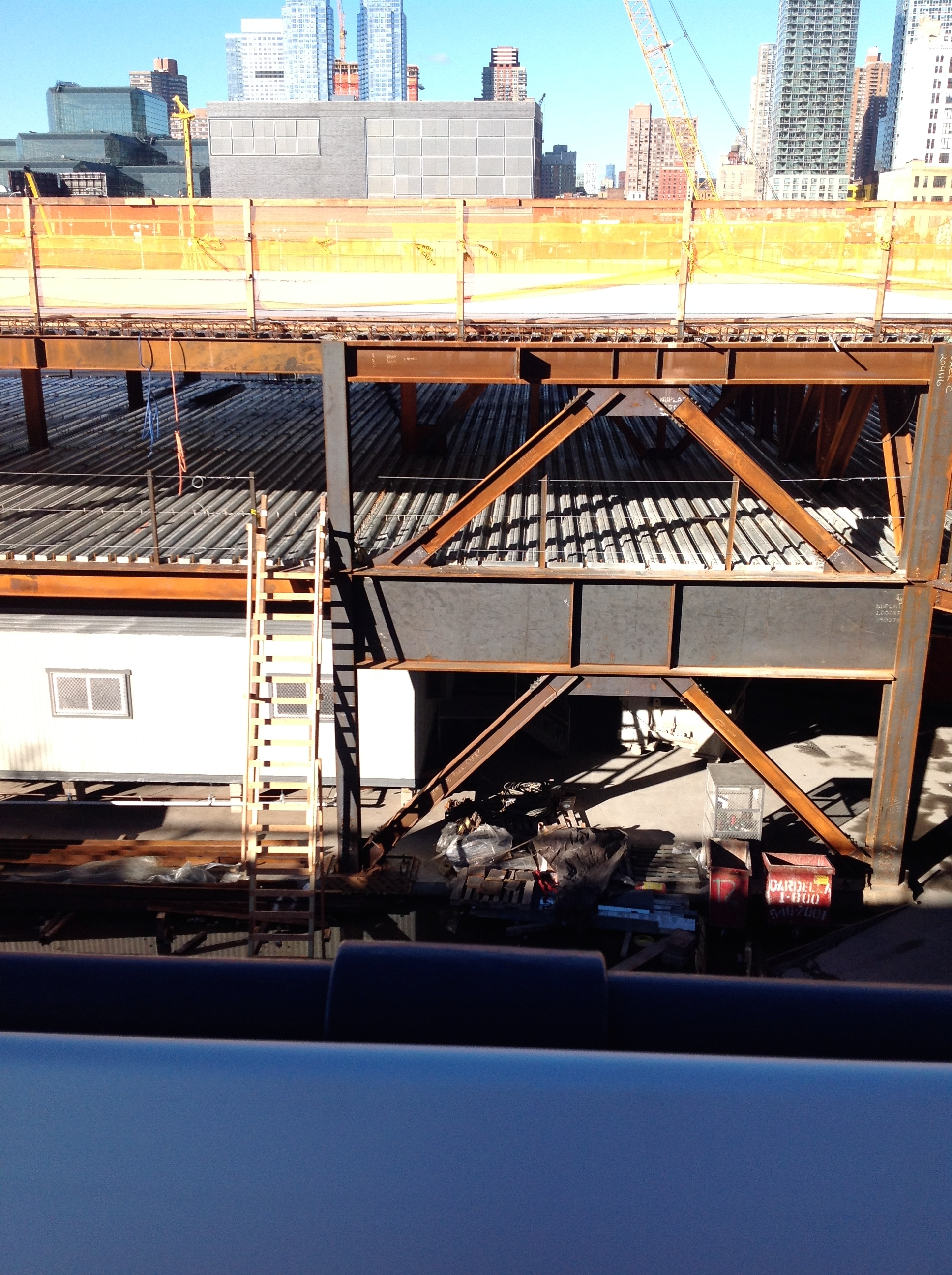
The platform supporting the Shed under construction in September 2014

As part of the Hudson Yards rezoning plan, the city preserved a parcel of city-owned land on West 30th Street between 10th and 11th Avenues, adjacent to The High Line, for future cultural use. Dan Doctoroff, then the Deputy Mayor for Economic Development and Rebuilding, spearheaded the effort to determine what should go there. Working closely with then Department of Cultural Affairs Commissioner Kate Levin, they determined the space "should be a highly flexible one that could cater to the growing desire of many artists to break out of their silos and blend disciplines". The City issued a Request for Proposals for this new cultural facility in 2008 at the height of the recession.

The City selected Diller Scofidio + Renfro (lead architect) and Rockwell Group (collaborating architect) to develop their concept for a flexible building, an "architecture of infrastructure" that could house all the creative disciplines under one roof. The Shed, a relatively small eight-story building compared to the Hudson Yards skyscrapers, was built at the south side of the Hudson Yards development site. The city retains ownership of the land on which the Shed is built and provided Capital Grant funding for the project. Funding for the Shed was secured from the City in July 2013.

Former Mayor Michael Bloomberg quietly donated $15 million to the Shed in 2012, then added another $60 million of donations five years later. The city had also given $50 million toward the project in 2013, representing the single largest capital grant given by the city that year; this funding was later raised to $75 million. The Shed won endorsements from the directors of the Museum of Modern Art and the Solomon R. Guggenheim Museum and Foundation.

As of March 2019, the Shed had received $529 million in donations for its $550 million capital campaign to fund building construction, programming and start-up expenses.

=== Construction ===
The Shed, a nonprofit organization, was formed in 2012 to oversee construction of the building, and to run the building when it opens. In 2013, Dan Doctoroff became Chairman. In that capacity, he led the $550 million capital campaign and the board of directors, oversaw the building's design and construction, and managed the search for the artistic director. The design of the Shed's building is a collaboration between two New York City architectural firms: lead architect Diller Scofidio + Renfro and collaborating architect Rockwell Group. The main contractor was Sciame, while the steel fabricator was Cimolai.

Construction of the Shed over the West Side Yard, began after caissons were sunk to support a platform over the tracks. The platform supporting the towers, comprising 16 bridges, was completed in late 2014. The construction of the building itself began in mid-2015. The name of the space was changed to simply "The Shed" in 2016. The retractable shell was completed by 2017. Although early reports stated that the building would open in 2017 or 2018, a 2015 report placed the opening date at 2019. As of May 2017, the pace of construction indicated that the Shed was projected to open in either 2018 or 2019.

By early January 2019, it was announced that the Shed would open on April 5, 2019, with four live productions and exhibitions. The Shed's building at Hudson Yards was ceremonially renamed as the Bloomberg Building after former mayor Bloomberg, who donated $75 million of the structure's predicted $475 million cost. In addition, the Shed signed a contract with Altice USA, who would become the Shed's "exclusive connectivity provider". A dedication ceremony for the Shed was held on April 1, 2019. The Shed opened as scheduled four days later.

== Design ==
Map of buildings and structures at Hudson Yards. Zoom the map and click on points for more details.

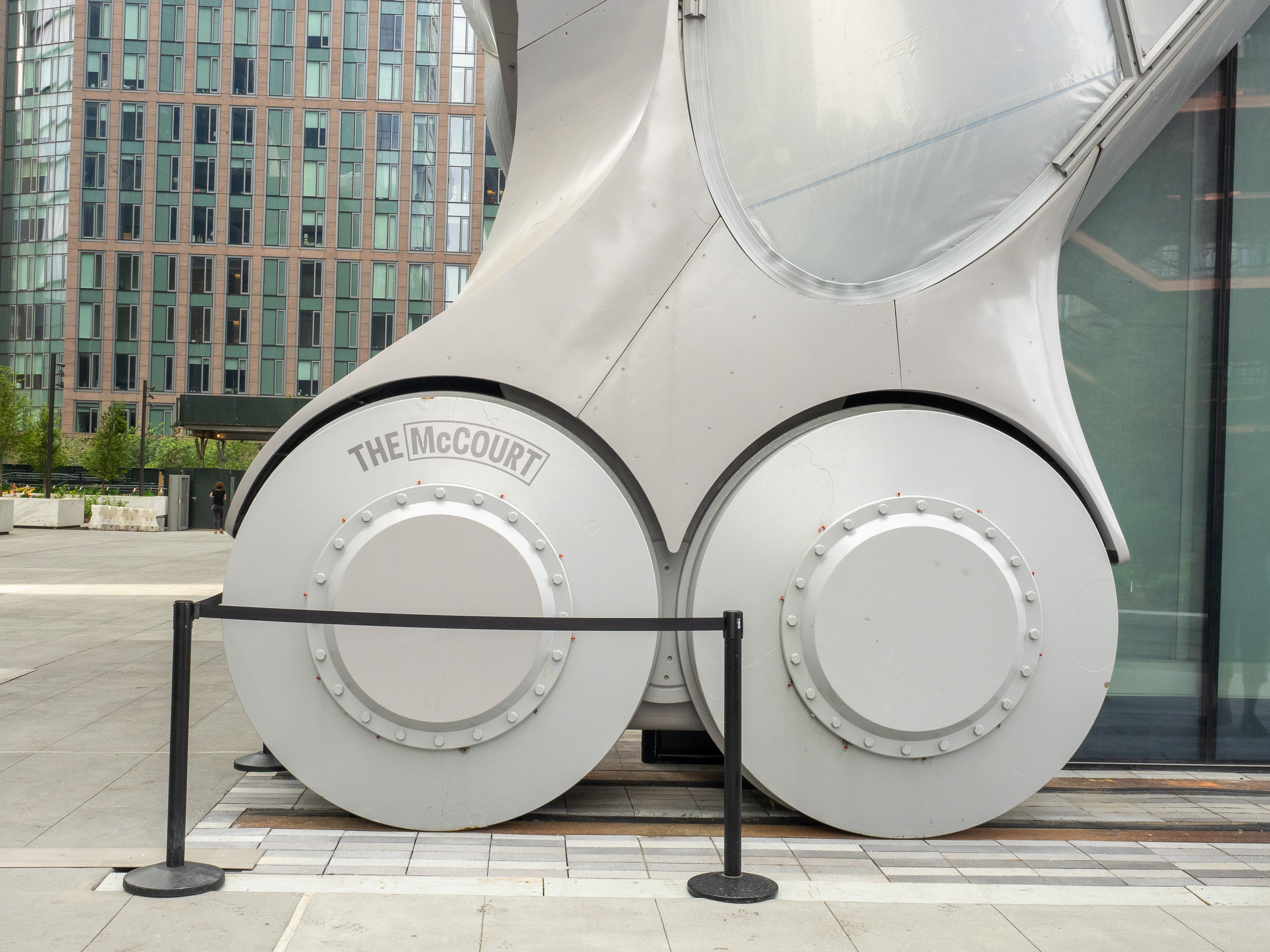
Wheels used to retract or to extend the shell

The Shed is a 170,000-square-foot (16,000 m^{2}) visual arts and performing arts center located at the 26-acre (110,000 m^{2}) Hudson Yards development's southern edge. The structure includes 40,000 square feet (3,700 m^{2}) of column-free exhibition space, 25,000 square feet (2,300 m^{2}) of "museum-quality" space, a theater with seating for up to 500 people, and an expandable, 16,000-square-foot (1,500 m^{2}) shell that uses industrial crane technology, allowing the space to expand and contract to accommodate many events and audiences. Viewers of indoor shows and exhibitions will be charged admission.

The Shed's main entrance is on 30th Street under the High Line; secondary entrances are located in the Hudson Yards public plaza. The Shed's Hudson Yards plaza entrance is located close to the 34th Street–Hudson Yards subway entrance. There are two galleries indoors on the first and second levels. On the third level is a flexible space that can be used for performances or exhibits.

The wraparound shell weighs 8 million pounds (3,600,000 kg), and is made of an exposed steel frame clad in a fluorine-based plastic called ETFE, which has the thermal properties of insulating glass at a fraction of the weight. The shell can close and open within 5 minutes and when the shell is retracted, the open-air plaza becomes a publicly accessible outdoor space. The shell retracts on eight bogie wheels, each 6 feet (1.8 m) in diameter, powered by a total of six 15-horsepower motors. The Shed is directly adjacent to 15 Hudson Yards and the High Line.

== Management ==
In 2014, Alex Poots, former director of the Manchester International Festival and Park Avenue Armory, was named CEO and Artistic Director of the Shed. In 2017, Poots earned $870,239 in compensation from the Shed.

In January 2023, he stepped down as CEO, while Maryann Jordan temporarily took over. Meredith "Max" Hodges became CEO in October 2023.

=== Board of directors ===
As of June 2026, the Board of Directors of The Shed consists of Jonathan Tisch (Chair), Ann Sarnoff (Vice Chair), Daniel L. Doctoroff (Founding Chair), Heather Baker, Ritu Banga, Neeraj Chandra, Misty Copeland, Roberta Denning, Jason Epstein, Lewis Frankfort, Robert Goldstein, Glenda G. Grace, Gary Hoberman, Meredith “Max” Hodges, Marcella Guarino Hymowitz, Todd Kahn, Yuliana Kim-Grant, Monish Kumar, Yu-Chi Lyra Kuo, Kate Dillon Levin, Christina Weiss Lurie, Frank McCourt, Darla Moore, Gerard Mossé, Colby Mugrabi, Claudia Rankine, Paula Recart, María Catalina Saieh Guzmán, Andrés Santo Domingo, Dean Shapiro, Harvey J. Spevak, Jed Walentas, Deborah Winshel, and Kenneth P. Wong. Ex officio members of the board include Julie Menin, Josephine Ishmon, Diya Vij, Brad Hoylman-Sigal, and Julie Su.

== Events ==
=== Notable events ===
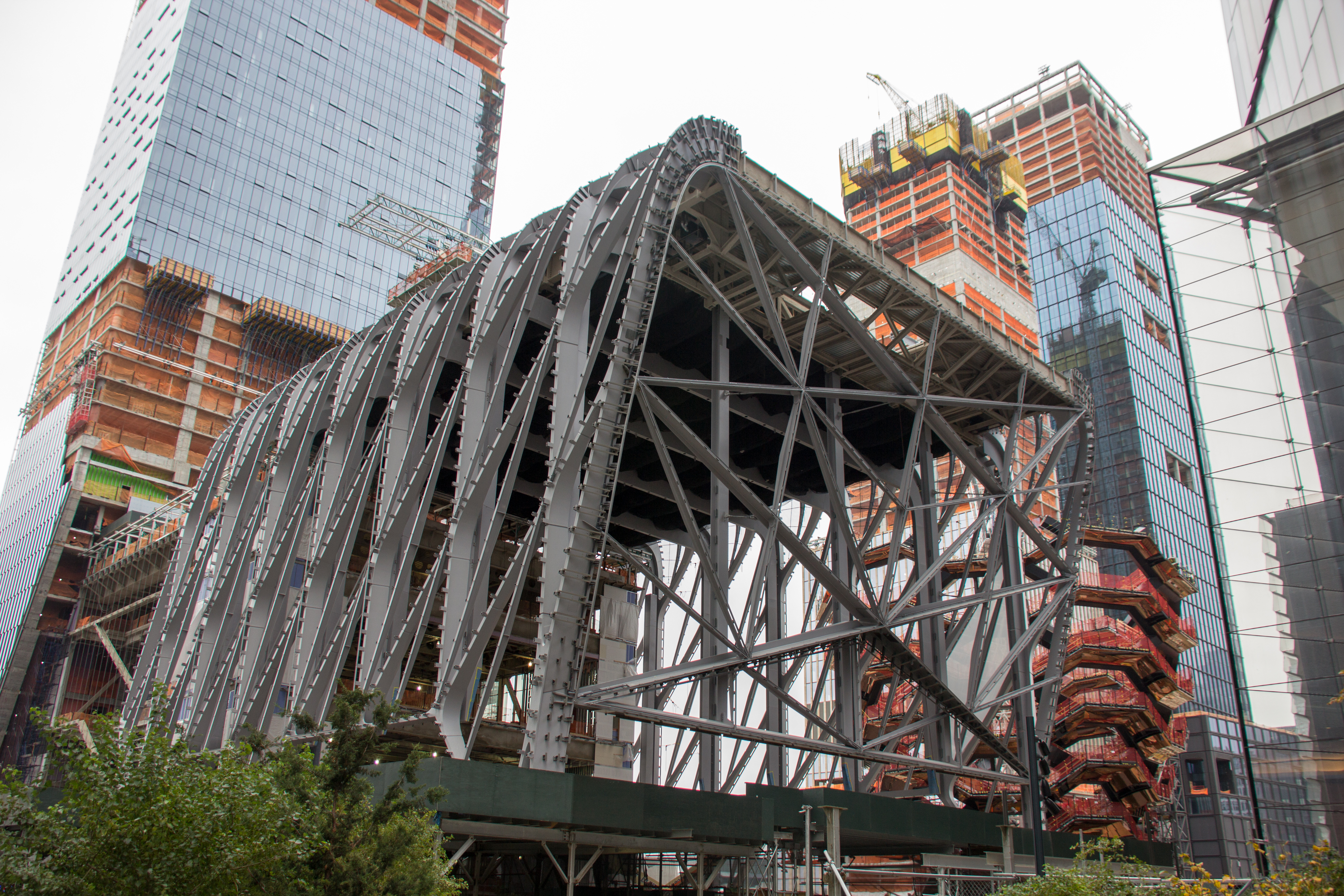
2017 view of the Shed and 10 and 15 Hudson Yards, with Vessel (under construction) behind it

In late 2016, the Shed started a citywide dance program about social justice issues. It also partnered with the MIT Media Lab to assist artists who were creating works involving virtual reality and artificial intelligence.

The first permanent art commission for the Shed was announced in May 2017. Artist Lawrence Weiner was commissioned to decorate the plaza with pavers arranged into 12-foot (3.7 m) letters, which would spell the phrase "In front of itself". The exhibitions and performances announced before the building's April 5, 2019, opening included a concert series exploring the impact of African American music conceived and directed by Steve McQueen and a creative team including Quincy Jones; a collaboration between artist Gerhard Richter and music composers Steve Reich and Arvo Pärt, the eponymous "Reich Richter Pärt'; "Norma Jeane Baker of Troy", a performance piece by the poet Anne Carson with music by Paul Clark, starring Ben Whishaw and Renee Fleming; and an exhibition of work from artist Trisha Donnelly. This would be followed by several other shows in quick succession. In summer 2018, the Shed hosted an exhibition by Tony Cokes about gentrification.

From May 6, 2019, to June 1, 2019, Icelandic music artist Björk performed a concert series known as "Björk's Cornucopia", which took place entirely on a set and included unique and bizarre imagery, a high emphasis on costume and set design, a choir segment, and activism for environmentalism. In addition, the Michael Bay film 6 Underground premiered at the Shed on December 10, 2019.

The Shed ceased all public programs on March 12, 2020, due to the COVID-19 pandemic in New York City. The Shed reopened its galleries on October 16, 2020, with an exhibition by Howardena Pindell. During the pandemic, emergency staircases were opened to allow visitors to comply with COVID-19 social distancing regulations by avoiding the elevators. During early 2021, the Shed announced it would resume live performances with a series featuring Kelsey Lu, the New York Philharmonic, Renée Fleming, and Michelle Wolf in April 2021. In 2023, The Shed premiered the final musical by Stephen Sondheim, Here We Are. From June to October 2025, it was the home of Viola's Room, a restaging of an immersive experience by British theater company Punchdrunk featuring Helena Bonham Carter. In 2026, there will be another immersive experience with An Ark featuring Ian McKellen.

=== Theatrical productions ===
Since its opening in 2019 notable theatrical productions have taken place, such as plays and musicals. These include:

Year	Title	Playwright	Notable Cast	Ref.
2022	The Search for Signs of Intelligent Life in the Universe	Jane Wagner	Cecily Strong	
2022	Straight Line Crazy	David Hare	Ralph Fiennes	
2023	Here We Are	Stephen Sondheim and David Ives	Bobby Cannavale and David Hyde Pierce	
2024	The Effect	Lucy Prebble	Taylor Russell and Paapa Essiedu	
2024	King Lear	William Shakespeare	Kenneth Branagh	
2025	The Brothers Size	Tarell Alvin McCraney	Andre Holland	
2025	This World of Tomorrow	Tom Hanks	Tom Hanks	
2026	The Other Place	Alexander Zeldin	Tobias Menzies and Emma D'Arcy	

== Critical reception ==
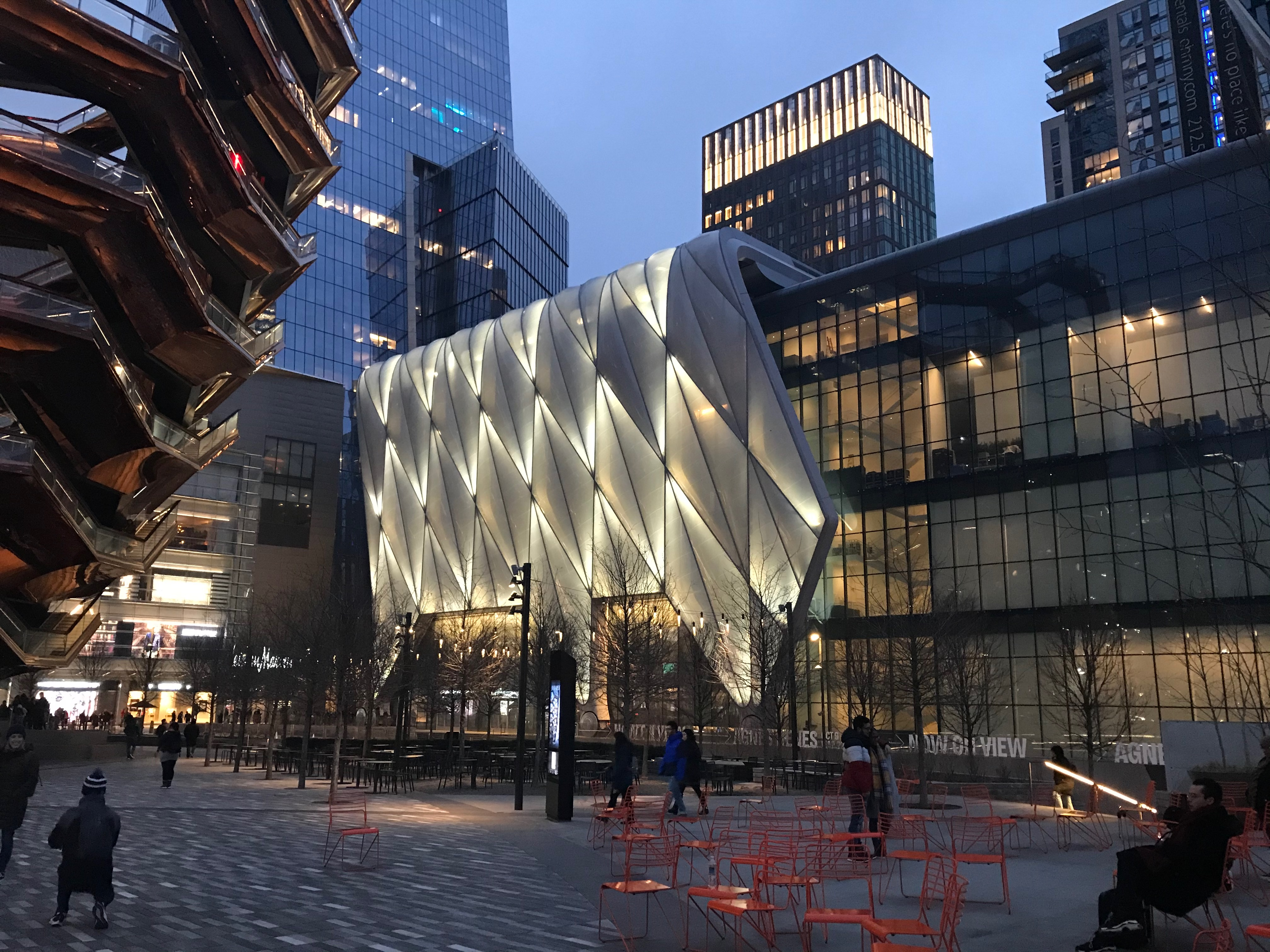
View from the west at night

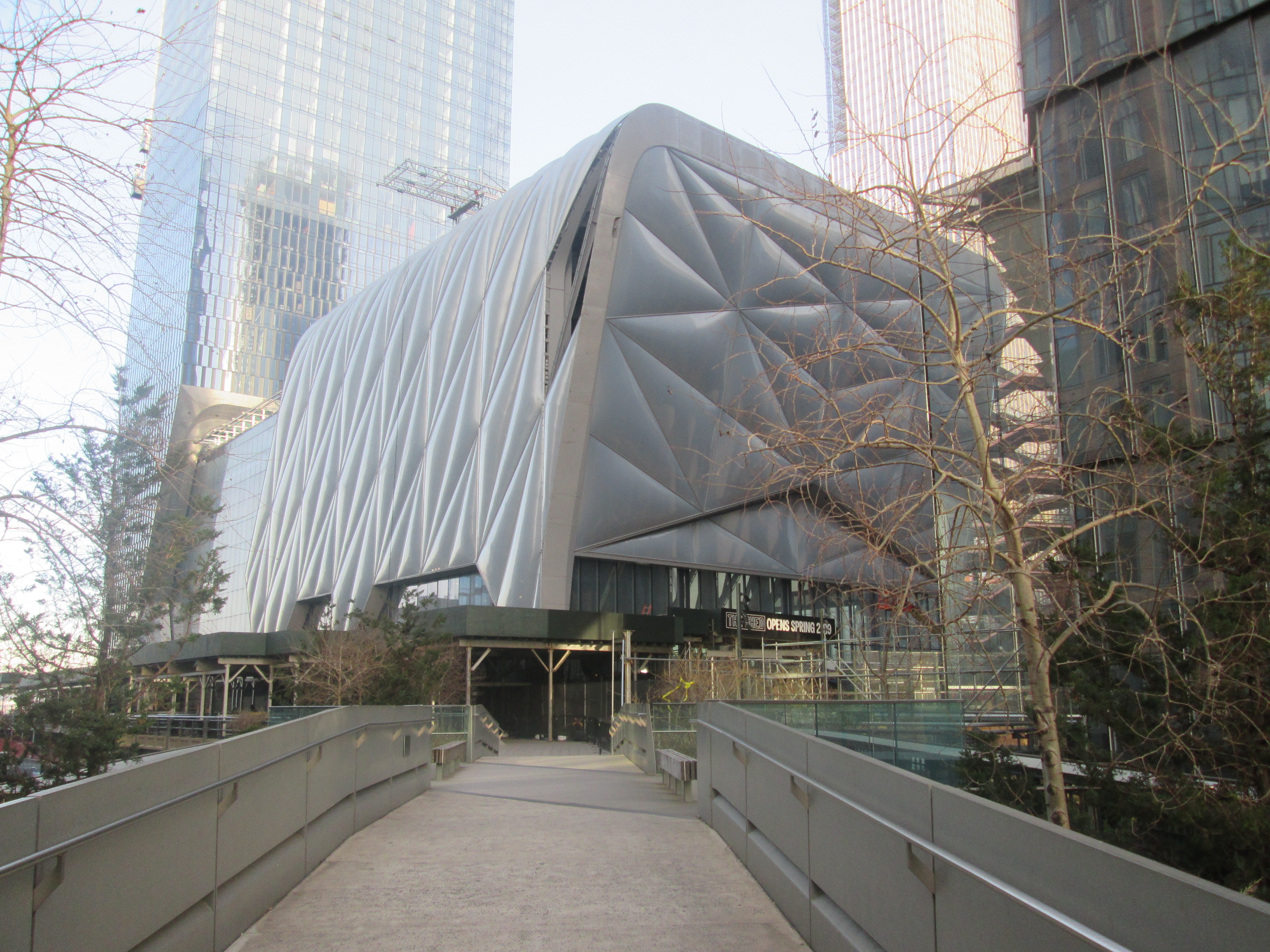
View from the southwest

The Shed's construction was initially opposed by local community leadership. Board members on Manhattan Community Board 4 stated that the Shed "could lack class", that the word "culture" is too vague for the name of such an exhibition space, and that problems could arise when a 20,000 square feet (1,900 m^{2}) space is closed off twice a year for two weeks (adding up to a month annually) for New York Fashion Week. Community board members also state that when the retractable roof is closed, 20,000 square feet (1,900 m^{2}) of open public space would be lost. Additionally, some expressed concerns that the large value of the Capital Grant allocation—US$50 million—was too much money to award to a building that did not yet exist.

The Shed has drawn mixed public reviews, as well as high praise from numerous art institutions. In an editorial for the art website Artsy, one writer stated that although "the building's innovative architecture seems ready to withstand the weight of [the Shed's] grand ambitions", the construction of the Shed also had the unforeseen side effect of "making New York ever less accessible for those without financial means", considering the poor neighborhoods located close to Hudson Yards. Joshua Barone of The New York Times hailed The Shed as "a project that could reshape and redefine the city's physical and cultural infrastructure" and "one of the most significant additions to New York City's cultural landscape in decades".

In August 2019, news of Shed board member Stephen Ross's plans to host a fundraiser for U.S. president Donald Trump's 2020 reelection campaign led several artists to protest. Fashion label Rag & Bone decided against hosting their fall 2019 New York Fashion Week show there. A. L. Steiner and Zackary Drucker both removed their work from an exhibition at the Shed. In December 2019, Ross left his position on the Shed's board of directors.

Time magazine included The Shed in its second annual list of 100 of the "World's Greatest Places" in August 2019.

== See also ==
- 10 Hudson Yards
- 15 Hudson Yards
- High Line
