= JS Bach Chamber Music Hall =

Temporary structure in Manchester, United Kingdom

The JS Bach Chamber Music Hall was a temporary structure in Manchester designed by British-Iraqi architect Zaha Hadid, which was constructed for the Manchester International Festival in 2009. The structure was erected within a 425m^{2} hall inside Manchester Art Gallery, assigned to host a series of nine concerts of the solo compositions of JS Bach by international performers Piotr Anderszewski, Jean-Guihen Queyras and Alina Ibragimova.

== Description ==
The construction is a suspended ribbon of translucent, lightweight, synthetic fabric (150 g/m^{2}) articulated by an internal steel structure with hidden internal acoustic panels. Sandy Brown Associates worked as acoustic consultants. Architects' Journal described the construction as "a striking white ribbon in a black box, [that] wraps around itself to create a stage for the performer as well as a space for the audience".

== Reception ==
Reaction to the work was largely positive with Anthony Tommasini commenting in The New York Times that "the space was a delight to be in and ... the music sounded up-close and exceptionally vibrant." The Independent described the structure as a "perfect union of sound and space" concluding that it was a "cunning creation of seamless ingenuity providing a curiously reverential setting." The Daily Telegraph described the space as "dazzling". The Guardian however commented "whether it acoustically enhances the performance is impossible to say - one suspects the impact is visual rather than aural".

== Other festivals ==
Following the Manchester festival, the work toured to Amsterdam in 2010 and Abu Dhabi in 2011.
