= Here We Are (musical) =

2023 musical

- Original Off-Broadway windowcard
- Music: Stephen Sondheim
- Lyrics: Stephen Sondheim
- Book: David Ives
- Basis: The Discreet Charm of the Bourgeoisie by Luis Buñuel; Jean-Claude Carrière; The Exterminating Angel by Luis Buñuel; Luis Alcoriza
- Premiere: October 22, 2023: The Shed, New York City
- Productions: 2023 Off-Broadway; 2025 London

Here We Are is a musical with music and lyrics by Stephen Sondheim and a book by David Ives inspired by two films of Luis Buñuel, The Exterminating Angel and The Discreet Charm of the Bourgeoisie.

== Development ==
Stephen Sondheim announced in February 2012 that he was working with David Ives on an ultimately unrealized musical titled All Together Now, saying he had "about 20–30 minutes of the musical completed". By October 2014, plans were underway for a Sondheim and Ives musical based on two Luis Buñuel films, The Exterminating Angel and The Discreet Charm of the Bourgeoisie, to open in previews at The Public Theater in 2017. An August 2016 reading for the musical was held at The Public Theater, and it was reported that only the first act was finished. A November 2016 workshop included Matthew Morrison, Shuler Hensley, Heidi Blickenstaff, Sierra Boggess, Gabriel Ebert, Sarah Stiles, Michael Cerveris, and Jennifer Simard. After media outlets mistakenly reported that the show had the working title Buñuel, Sondheim clarified the show title had yet to be decided.

In June 2019, The Public Theatre denied reports that it would be part of its 2019–20 season, as it was still in development, but would be produced "when it is ready". On April 27, 2021, it was reported that the musical was no longer in development. However, on The Late Show with Stephen Colbert on September 15, 2021, Sondheim announced he was working on a musical called Square One in collaboration with Ives. The same day, Nathan Lane revealed that he and Bernadette Peters were involved in a reading of this new work. Before his death on November 26, 2021, Sondheim's final interview confirmed that Square One was adapted from the Buñuel films. Subsequently titled Here We Are, the musical would premiere off-Broadway at The Shed in September 2023, nearly two years after his death.

== Plot ==
The first act is based on The Discreet Charm of the Bourgeoisie, and the second act on The Exterminating Angel.

=== Act I: The Road ===
One Saturday morning, in the fabulous apartment of Leo and Marianne Brink, the couple is surprised by the arrival of their friends, Paul Zimmer and his wife Claudia Bursik-Zimmer. They are joined by Raffael Santello Di Santicci, the ambassador of (the fictional country) Moranda, and Marianne's younger sister Fritz, an anti-capitalist political hothead. The Brinks, who don't recall inviting their guests, are unprepared to host. Leo offers to take everyone out to brunch, and they all head out.

On the way to the restaurant ("The Road 1"), Marianne celebrates the glorious day. Raffael flirts with her via "an old Morandan proverb," although he's already having an affair with Claudia. Leo, Raffael, and Paul discuss the drug cartel that they secretly run. Fritz warns the group of approaching global catastrophe.

They arrive at their brunch destination, a café with seemingly everything in creation on the menu ("Café Everything — Toast 1"). A waiter regretfully informs the group that the restaurant has no food or beverages and eventually shoots himself (“Waiter’s Song”).

As the group seeks food again ("The Road 2"), it is revealed through a phone call that Fritz, under the code name "Apocalypse," is covertly working for the anarchist group PRADA (People's Revolutionary Anti-Domination Army) and must raise $50 million to start a world revolution to overthrow capitalism. Raffael attempts to flirt with Fritz, then serenades Claudia. Fritz overhears Leo, Paul, and Raffael discussing drugs and sees her chance to get the money.

At the next restaurant, specializing in French deconstructivist cuisine ("Bistro à la Mode — Toast 2"), the group encounters a weeping waitress ("It Is What It Is") and discovers the restaurant staff is holding a funeral for the restaurant's dead chef in the back room. With no food to be had, they hit the road again ("The Road 3") and Fritz blackmails the men into giving her $50 million to start the revolution.

At the next restaurant, an Italian brasserie ("Osteria Zeno — Toast 3"), their attempt to eat is interrupted by a colonel from Homeland Security and a poetic lieutenant, with whom Fritz instantly falls in love. The Soldier shares a surreal dream of his that mimics reality ("The Soldier's Dream"). When the restaurant's food turns out to be fake, Raffael suggests supper at his Embassy. Colonel Martin and the Soldier join the group.

Finding themselves on the road once more in search of a meal ("The Road 4"), Raffael serenades Marianne. When they reach their destination ("Oh, Look, Here's the Embassy!"), a Bishop reconsidering his chosen vocation comes to the door looking for a job ("Bishop's Song").

As the group is seated for dinner, gunfire erupts in the distance – the result of Fritz's fundraising. On her cellphone, Fritz attempts to call off "the end of the world" only to discover that the embassy butler, Windsor, is in fact Inferno, her PRADA chief. Dinner is served at last ("End of Act One").

=== Act II: The Room ===
In the Morandan Embassy salon after dinner, the group relaxes ("Digestion") while Marianne savors the luxurious room ("Shine"). When it's time to go, everyone balks at leaving for some reason and remains inside the room ("Hesitation"). They decide to stay the night, bedding down right where they are. Fritz and the Soldier express their feelings ("Double Duet"), then retire to the room's closet to make love. In the middle of the night, Marianne has a surreal encounter with what appears to be a bear ("Interlude 1: Marianne and The Bear").

The next morning, the Colonel concludes that they're trapped and unable to leave the room – even though the door before them is wide open. In the ensuing panic, Leo has a heart attack, Windsor reveals himself to the group as Inferno, and explosions are heard. They realize it may be the actual end of the world outside.

Days and nights pass inside the room as the hungry, thirsty group becomes more desperate. When water is discovered inside a wall, they dance in the downpour ("Interlude 2: Wandering"). Late one night, Marianne and the Bishop snack on book pages and have a quiet philosophical exchange ("Interlude 3: Snow") after which they enjoy a light indoor snowfall.

With the group desperate to get out, Raffael is about to sacrifice himself to free them when Marianne realizes they can get out if they just reenact their steps on the evening they decided to stay ("Hesitation — Reprise"). When they've all been released from the room, the Colonel, the Soldier and the Bishop take their leave. The original group of friends returns to the road and their eternal search for food – but now they find themselves running, amidst what seems to be the end of the world.

== Musical numbers ==
Act I

- "Here We Are" (Overture) – Orchestra
- "The Road 1" (Part 1) – "Who's hungry?" – Leo, Claudia, Paul, Raffael, Marianne
- "The Road 1" (Part 2) – "Are we not blessed?" – Marianne, Claudia, Raffael, Paul, Leo, Fritz
- "The Road 1" (Part 3) – "Only just the end of the world" – Fritz, Raffael, Marianne, Claudia, Paul, Leo
- "Café Everything" (Toast 1) – Maitresse D’, Marianne, Paul, Claudia, Leo, Raffael, Waiter
- "Waiter's Song" – Waiter, Paul, Raffael, Leo, Marianne, Fritz
- "The Road 2" – "If it isn't the food..." – Claudia, Marianne, Leo, Fritz, Raffael, Paul
- "Bistro à La Mode" (Toast 2) – Leo, Claudia, Marianne, Paul, Raffael
- "It Is What It Is" – French Waitress, Marianne, Leo, Claudia, Paul, Mourners
- "The Road 3" – "Such an afternoon" – Leo, Raffael, Marianne, Claudia, Paul, Fritz
- "Osteria Zeno" (Toast 3) – Paul, Italian Waiter, Leo, Marianne, Claudia, Paul, Colonel, Soldier
- "The Soldier's Dream" – Fritz, Colonel, Marianne, Claudia, Raffael, Soldier, Italian Waiter, Leo, Paul
- "The Road 4" (Part 1) – "Did you leave a tip?" – Leo, Marianne, Claudia, Fritz, Soldier, Raffael
- "The Road 4" (Part 2) – "Marianne..." – Raffael, Marianne, Leo
- "Oh, Look, Here's the Embassy!" – Raffael, Leo, Fritz, Windsor
- "Bishop's Song" – Bishop, Raffael, Marianne, Leo, Colonel, Claudia, Paul
- "End of Act One" – Paul, Leo, Fritz, Claudia, Raffael, Windsor, Soldier, Colonel, Bishop

Act II

- "Entr'acte" – Orchestra
- "Digestion" – Marianne, Claudia, Paul, Fritz, Windsor, Raffael, Bishop
- "Shine" – Marianne, Paul, Leo, Claudia, Fritz
- "Hesitation" – Raffael, Paul, Claudia, Bishop, Marianne, Leo, Colonel, Soldier, Fritz, Windsor
- "Double Duet" – Soldier, Fritz
- "Interlude 1: Marianne and the Bear" – Marianne
- "Interlude 2: Wandering" – Bishop, Colonel, Leo, Marianne, Claudia, Raffael, Paul, Windsor, Fritz, Bishop, Soldier
- "Interlude 3: Snow" – Orchestra, Marianne, Bishop
- "Hesitation" (Reprise) – Fritz, Raffael, Paul, Soldier, Claudia, Marianne, Colonel, Bishop, Leo
- "Exit Music" – Orchestra

== Characters and vocal roles ==
- MARIANNE – 35–45. Ethereal. Daffy. A cool beauty with a warm heart. Capable of unexpected lyricism. A terrific singer with a large vocal range spanning from chesty and conversational to lyric soprano. Strength with rhythm is a plus.
- LEO – 60s. Charming billionaire. Ruthless, insatiable, a little crude. Some non-strenuous singing. Strength with rhythm is a plus.
- RAFFAEL – 50s. Cosmopolitan and suave, great-looking. Has great charm and humor. Lyric baritone with some vocal power, not bottom heavy, vocally. Strength with rhythm is a plus.
- CLAUDIA – 40s. Fleshy, sexy, hungry, loud, entertaining, always happy to take exception or pick a fight. Excellent comic and dramatic skills.Some non-strenuous singing. Belt/mix. Could be a character sound. Strength with rhythm is a plus.
- PAUL – 40s. Laid back, low-key, and always nice with an under layer of anxiety. Has solid but understated comic skills. Some non-strenuous singing. Baritone with good rhythmic skills.
- FRITZ – 20s. A political rebel from upper-middle-class Greenwich. Angry at the world. Lonely. Sulky. Self-Starved. Strong singer. Role requires vocal flexibility ranging from chatty belt to lyricism.
- COLONEL – 40s. Comically block-headed and strong-jawed, all-business and no-brains. Comically appealing because he's so deeply unaware. Minimal singing.
- SOLDIER – 25–30. Very attractive. A dreamer, searcher, natural-born poet in love with the idea of love. Excellent singer. Lyric baritone with some good tenor notes. Warm vocal sound.
- BISHOP – 30-40s. Sweet, gentle, endearingly lost. Great comic skill, natural personal appeal, and good singing skills. Bright character baritone.
- WOMAN (Eva the Maid, Maitresse D', French Waitress, Soldier's Mother, McGogg) – Multiple and very diverse parts. Comically inventive and transformational. Impeccable comic accent(s). Strong voice. Think Kurt Weill meets French Chanteuse. Broad and big vocals.
- MAN (Manservant, Waiter, Italian Waiter, Windsor/Inferno) – Multiple parts. Superb comedy, accents, strong character work and good singing. Character baritone range.

== Casts ==
Character	Off-Broadway	London
Character	2023	2025
Marianne Brink	Rachel Bay Jones	Jane Krakowski
Leo Brink	Bobby Cannavale	Rory Kinnear
Fritz	Micaela Diamond	Chumisa Dornford-May
Claudia Bursik-Zimmer	Amber Gray	Martha Plimpton
Paul Zimmer	Jeremy Shamos	Jesse Tyler Ferguson
Raffael Santello Di Santicci	Steven Pasquale	Paulo Szot
Bishop	David Hyde Pierce	Harry Hadden-Paton
Man	Denis O'Hare	Denis O'Hare
Woman	Tracie Bennett	Tracie Bennett
Soldier	Jin Ha	Richard Fleeshman
Colonel Martin	Francois Battiste	Cameron Johnson

== Production history ==
=== World premiere: Off-Broadway (2023-24) ===
Here We Are premiered at The Shed's Griffin Theatre in previews on September 28, 2023, officially opening on October 22, 2023, and running until January 21, 2024 (after being extended from January 7). The production, directed by Joe Mantello, featured a cast including Francois Battiste, Tracie Bennett, Bobby Cannavale, Micaela Diamond, Amber Gray, Jin Ha, Rachel Bay Jones, Denis O'Hare, Steven Pasquale, David Hyde Pierce, and Jeremy Shamos. It was choreographed by Sam Pinkleton. Reviews were positive, if largely restrained.

=== London (2025) ===
The musical received its European premiere in the Lyttelton Theatre at the Royal National Theatre in London running from April 23, 2025, to June 28, 2025. Mantello directed the production, and the cast featured O'Hare and Bennett reprising their roles joined by Rory Kinnear, Chumisa Dornford-May, Jesse Tyler Ferguson, Richard Fleeshman, Harry Hadden-Paton, Cameron Johnson, Jane Krakowski, Martha Plimpton, and Paulo Szot. The production was shortlisted for the Standard Theatre Awards for Best Musical and Best Musical Performance for Bennett.

== Cast recording ==
Recorded at Power Station, the original cast album was released May 17, 2024 on CD and streaming by Concord Theatricals. A double-LP vinyl was released on September 6.

== Awards and nominations ==
=== 2025 London production ===
Year	Award Ceremony	Category	Nominee	Result
2026	Laurence Olivier Awards	Best New Musical		Nominated
2026	Laurence Olivier Awards	Best Actress in a Musical	Jane Krakowski	Nominated
2026	Laurence Olivier Awards	Best Actress in a Supporting Role in a Musical	Tracie Bennett	Nominated
2026	Standard Theatre Awards	Best Musical		Nominated
2026	Standard Theatre Awards	Best Musical Performance	Tracie Bennett	Nominated
2026	Critics' Circle Theatre Awards	Best New Musical		Nominated
2026	Critics' Circle Theatre Awards	Best Ensemble or Cast		Nominated
2026	Critics' Circle Theatre Awards	Best Designer	David Zinn	Nominated
