= Paulo Szot =

Brazilian operatic baritone

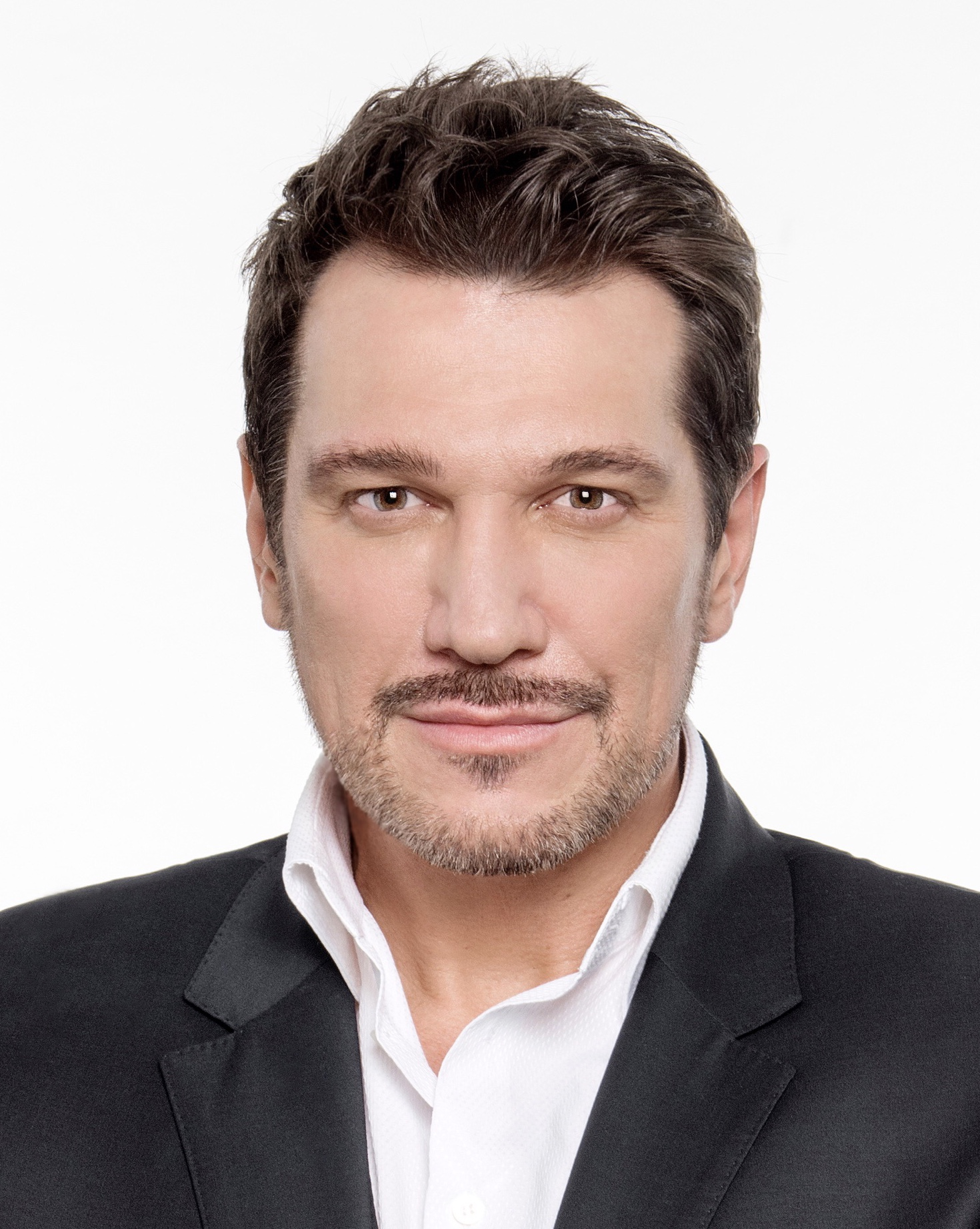
- Szot in 2022
- Born: São Paulo, Brazil
- Occupations: Actor, singer
- Years active: 1997–present
- Height: 6 ft 1 in (185 cm)
- Awards: Full list

Paulo Szot is a Brazilian operatic baritone singer and actor. He made his opera debut in 1997 and his international career has included performances with the Metropolitan Opera, La Scala di Milano, Paris Opera, Bayerische Staatsoper, Opera Australia, Liceo de Barcelona, among many others.

In 2008, he made his Broadway debut as Emile De Becque, reprising the roles in 2022 and 2026, in a revival of South Pacific, for which he won the Tony Award for Best Performance by a Leading Actor in a Musical, the Drama Desk Award, the Outer Critics Circle Award and the Theatre World Award. In 2012 he was nominated for a Laurence Olivier Award for best actor in a musical, and in 2014 was nominated for the MAC Award for best Celebrity Artist becoming the first Brazilian to receive such honors. His other stage credits include portraying the role of Juan Perón in the Sydney Opera House production of Evita, starring as Billy Flynn in the 2020/2021 cast of Broadway’s Chicago, and originating the role of Lance in the hit Broadway musical & Juliet. He starred in the London premiere of Stephen Sondheim's Here We Are in 2025 and later that year starred as Hades in the Broadway cast of Hadestown.

== Biography ==
Szot was born in São Paulo to Polish parents who emigrated to Brazil after World War II. He began his musical training in piano at the age of five and later added violin and classical ballet. However, at age 21, a knee injury cut short any aspirations for a career in dance, causing him, with encouragement from his instructor, to pursue singing instead.

Szot studied at Jagiellonian University in Poland. He began singing professionally in 1990 with the National Song & Dance Ensemble "Śląsk". Later, he made his professional opera debut in a production of Il barbiere di Siviglia at the Municipal Theatre of São Paulo in 1997. Since then, he has performed with the New York City Opera, the Palm Beach Opera, the Canadian Opera Company, Opéra de Marseille, and Vlaamse Opera, among others, in such operas as L'elisir d'amore, La bohème, Don Giovanni, Cavalleria rusticana, Pagliacci, Carmen, Così fan tutte, Le nozze di Figaro and Maria Golovin. In March 2010 he made his debut at the Metropolitan Opera as Kovalyov in Dmitri Shostakovich's The Nose. Szot returned to the Metropolitan Opera as Escamillo sharing the stage with the French tenor Roberto Alagna and as Lescaut in Manon along with Anna Netrebko. Szot returned to the Met in 2014 as the Captain of the Achille Lauro in The Death of Klinghoffer. He sang the role of Guglielmo in Mozart's Così fan tutte at the Palais Garnier, and at the Aix-en-Provence Festival in Le nozze di Figaro. In 2013 he sang in The Nose at Teatro dell'Opera di Roma and at La Scala in the role of Filip Filippovich, the protagonist of Alexander Raskatov's 2009 opera A Dog's Heart. In 2018 and 2019, Szot sang the role of the Celebrant in the Chicago Symphony Orchestra's performance of Leonard Bernstein's Mass under the direction of Marin Alsop with the Chicago Children's Choir and the Highland Park High School Marching Band.

Of his performance in South Pacific, Ben Brantley of The New York Times wrote: "When he delivers 'Some Enchanted Evening' or 'This Nearly Was Mine,' it's not as a swoon-making blockbuster (though of course it is), but as a measured and honest consideration of love."

== Personal life ==
Szot is openly gay.

== Stage productions ==
- National Song and Dance Ensemble Slask - from 1989 - 1995 - Koszecin, Poland
- Il Barbiere di Siviglia – 1996 – Teatro Paulo Eiró, São Paulo
- Gianni Scchicchi – 1997 – Sesc Ipiranga, São Paulo
- La Bohème – 1998 – Teatro Alfa Real, São Paulo
- Le Barbier de Séville – 1997 – Teatro Municipal de Santo André
- Carmen – 1998 – Teatro Municipal de São Paulo
- La Bohème – 1998 – Teatro Municipal de São Paulo
- L'elisir d'amore – 1998 – Festival Ópera de Manaus
- Don Giovanni – 1999 – Teatro Alfa Real, São Paulo
- Le Barbier de Séville – 1999 – Teatro São Pedro, São Paulo
- Don Giovanni – 1999 – Municipal de São Paulo
- Le Barbier de Séville – 1999 – Teatro São Pedro de Porto Alegre
- O Guarani – 1999 – Teatro Amazonas
- Carmen – 2000 – Teatro Municipal do Rio de Janeiro
- Cavaleria Rusticana – 2000 – Teatro Alfa Real, São Paulo
- I Pagliacci – 2000 – Teatro Alfa Real, São Paulo
- Die Fledermaus – 2000 – Teatro Rio de Janeiro
- Cavaleria Rusticana – 2000 – Teatro Municipal de São Paulo
- Pagliacci – 2000 – Teatro Municipal de São Paulo
- Tannhäuser – 2001 – Teatro Municipal do Rio de Janeiro
- Carmen – 2001 – Teatro Alfa, São Paulo
- Carmen – 2001 – Teatro Municipal de São Paulo
- Don Giovanni – 2001 – Teatro Amazonas
- La Bohème – 2001 – Teatro Amazonas
- Hansel et Gretel – 2001 – Teatro Municipal de São Paulo
- Manon – 2002 – Teatro Amazonas
- Manon – 2002 – Teatro Alfa – São Paulo
- Pagliacci – 2002 – Teatro Amazonas
- Il Barbiere di Siviglia - 2003 - Palácio das Artes
- Hansel et Gretel – 2003 – Teatro Municipal de São Paulo
- Cavaleria Rusticana – 2003 – Teatro Amazonas
- Don Pasquale – 2003 – Teatro São Pedro, São Paulo
- Don Pasquale – 2003 – Teatro Municipal de Santo André
- Lustige Witwe – 2003 – Porto Alegre
- Carmen – 2003 – New York City Opera
- Don Giovanni – 2003 – Michigan Opera
- Le Nozze di Figaro – 2004 – New York City Opera
- Carmen – 2004 – Palm Beach Opera
- Eugène Onegin – 2004 – Ópera de Marseille
- Orfeo – 2004 – Teatro Sérgio Cardoso
- L'elisir d'amore – 2005 – New York City Opera
- Rita – 2005 – Festival de Campos do Jordão
- Dido et Aeneas – 2005 – Opera de Marseille
- Don Giovanni – 2005 – Opera de Toulon
- Don Giovanni – 2005 – Opera de Bordeaux
- Così fan tutte – 2006 – Opera de Marseille
- Maria Golovin – 2006 – Opera de Marseille
- Don Giovanni – 2006 – Opera de Bogota - Colombia
- Così fan tutte – 2007 – Opera de Nice
- Le nozze di Figaro – 2007 – Boston
- Maria Golovin – Spoleto Opera Festival, 2007 - Italy
- Le Portrait de Manon – 2007 – Liceo de Barcelona
- Le Nozze di Figaro – 2007 – Vlaamse Opera, Anvers
- Le Nozze di Figaro – 2008 – Vlaamse Opera, Gand
- South Pacific – 2008 – Lincoln Center Theater, New York - Emile de Becque
- La Veuve Joyeuse – 2008 – Opera de Marseille
- South Pacific – 2009 – Lincoln Center Theater, New York - Emile de Becque
- The Nose – 2010 – Metropolitan Opera New York
- South Pacific – 2010 – Lincoln Center Theater, New York - Emile de Becque
- Carmen – 2011 – Metropolitan Opera New York
- Così fan tutte – 2011 – Opera Garnier, Paris
- South Pacific – 2011 – Barbican, London - Emile de Becque
- Carmen – 2011 – San Francisco Opera
- South Pacific – 2011 – Oxford - Emile de Becque
- Manon – 2012 – Metropolitan Opera House New York
- Le Nozze di Figaro – 2012 – Festival d'Aix-en-Provence
- Don Giovanni – 2012 – Washington Opera
- The Nose - Il Naso – 2013 – Opera di Roma
- A Dog's Heart - Cuore di Cane – 2013 – La Scala
- The Nose – 2013 – Metropolitan Opera
- Die Fledermaus - 2013/2014 – Metropolitan Opera
- Eugène Onegin - 2014 - Melbourne Opera House
- Candide — 2014 — Sala São Paulo - OSESP
- The Death of Klinghoffer – 2014 – Metropolitan Opera
- Le Nozze di Figaro – 2014 - Théâtre National de Bahreïn / Aix-en-Provence
- Manon Lescaut - Teatro Municipal de Sao Paulo - Lescaut - 2015
- Die Fledermaus - The Metropolitan Opera - 2015/2016 - Falke
- Madama Butterfly - Opera de Marseille - 2016 - Sharpless
- Romeo et Juliette - Palácio das Artes - 2016 - Mercutio
- My Fair Lady - Teatro Santander - 2016 - Henry Higgins
- Così fan tutte - "Don Alfonso" - 2017 - Palais Garnier Opéra National de Paris
- The New Prince - 2017 - Dutch Opera - Hamilton/Clinton/Nixon - Amsterdam - Nederlands
- Carmen - Bayerische Staatsoper - Munich - Escamillo - 2017 - Germany
- Evita - Shakespeare Festival - Pennsylvania - Juan Peron - 2017 - USA
- Street Scene - Teatro Real - Madri - 2018 - Frank Maurant
- La Traviata - Palácio das Artes - BH - 2018 - Giorgio Germont
- La Traviata - Teatro Municipal de Sao Paulo - 2018 - G. Germont
- Mass - Leonard Bernstein - South Bank Centre - 2018 - Celebrant - London
- Mass - Leonard Bernstein - Ravinia Festival - 2018 - Celebrant - USA
- Evita - A. Lloyd Webber - Opera Australia - Sydney and Melbourne - 2018/2019 - Juan Peron
- Merry Widow - Franz Lehar - Opera di Roma - 2019 - Danilo
- Mass - Leonard Bernstein - Ravinia Festival - 2019 - Celebrant - USA
- Madama Butterfly - Puccini - Metropolitan Opera - New York - 2019 - Sharpless
- Chicago - Ambassador Theater, Broadway - New York - 2020 and 2021 - Billy Flynn (singing. English)
- Street Scene - Opera de Monte Carlo - 2020 - Frank
- Chicago - Teatro Santander - São Paulo - 2022 - Billy Flynn (singing in Brazilian)
- La boheme - Puerto Rico - 2022 - Marcello
- & Juliet - Princess of Wales Theatre - Toronto - 2022 - Lance
- & Juliet - Sondheim Theater - Broadway - 2023–2026 - Lance
- Simon Boccanegra - Amazon Opera Festival - 2024 - Simon Boccanegra
- Cosi fan tutte - Opera de Paris - 2024 - Don Alfonso
- South Pacific in Concert - Lincoln Centre - 2024 - Émile de Becque
- Otello - Puerto Rico Symphony / Culturarte - 2025 - Iago
- Carmen - Detroit Symphony Orchestra - 2025 - Escamillo
- Here We Are - National Theatre - 2025
- Evita - The Muny - 2025 - Juan Peron
- Hadestown - Broadway - 2025 - Hades
- The Light in the Piazza - Signor Naccarelli - Opera Theatre of St. Louis
- Don Carlo - Rodrigo - Theatro Municipal de São Paulo
- South Pacific - The Muny - 2026 - Emile de Becque
- & Juliet - Lance - Broadway - Summer 2026 Limited Engagement
- Man of La Mancha - Don Quixote - Arizona Music Festival - 2026

== Awards ==
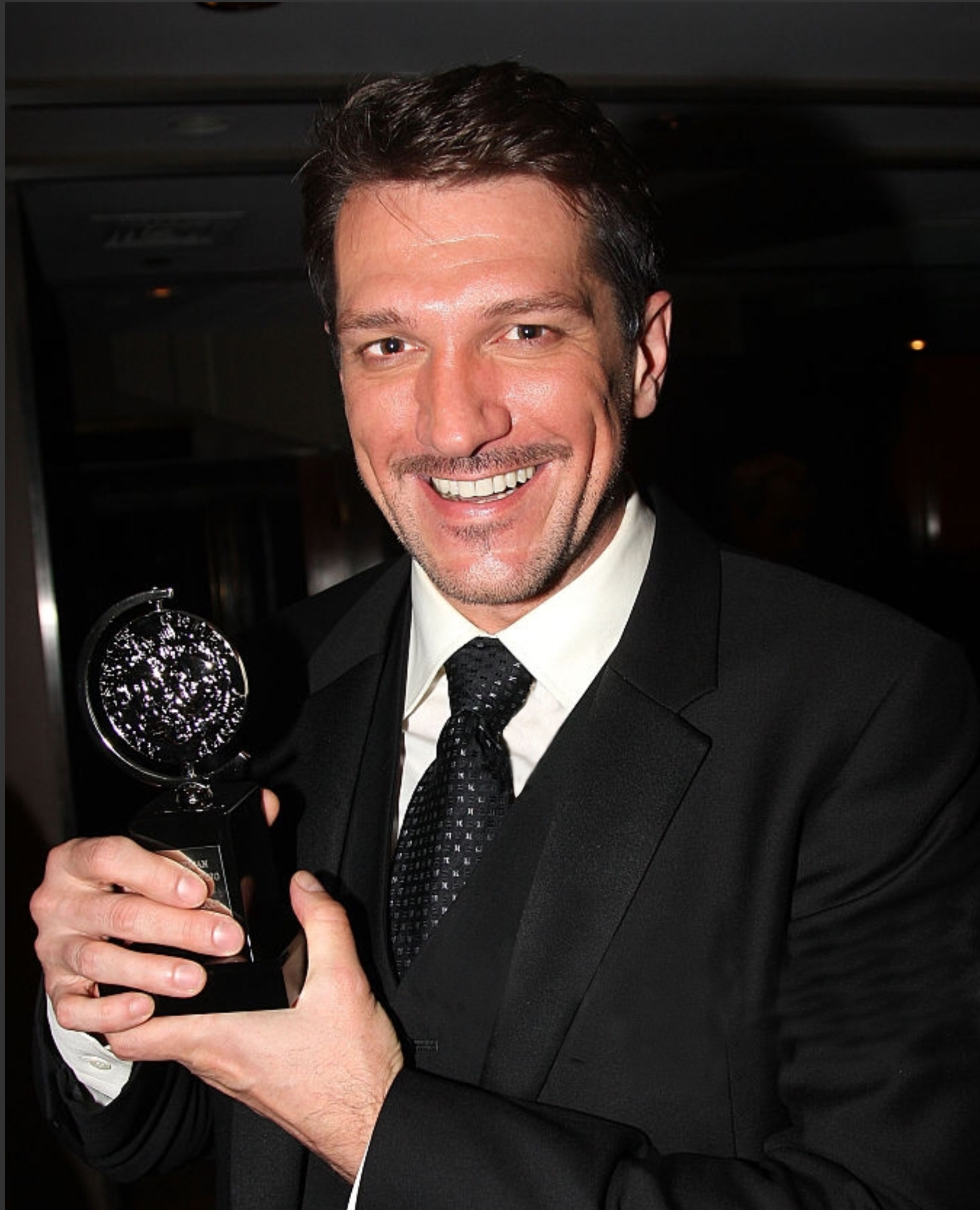
Szot receiving his Tony Award in 2008

Year	Award	Category	Work	Result
2000	Prêmio Carlos Gomes	Best Opera Singer	Male Category	Won
2008	Drama League Awards	Distinguished Performance Award	South Pacific	Nominated
2008	Theare World Award	Outstanding Actor in a Musical	South Pacific	Won
2008	Outer Critics Circle Award	Outstanding Actor in a Musical	South Pacific	Won
2008	Drama Desk Award	Outstanding Actor in a Musical	South Pacific	Won
2008	Tony Awards	Best Performance by a Leading Actor in a Musical	South Pacific	Won
2008	Joan & Joseph F. Cullman Award	Extraordinary Creativity	South Pacific	Won
2008	Polish Ministry of Culture	Bronze Medal “Gloria Artis for Merit to Culture”	Life Achievement	Won
2009	Premio Faz Diferença	Jornal O Globo	Segundo Caderno/Musica	Won
2011	Dallas Opera	Maria Callas Debut Artist of the Year	Don Giovanni	Nominated
2012	Laurence Olivier Awards	Best Actor in a Musical	South Pacific	Nominated
2014	MAC Awards	Best Celebrity Artist		Nominated
2016	The Raymond and Beverly Sackler Award	Personal Excellence in use of the Human Voice	Life achievement	Won
