= Manchester International Festival =

Art festival in England

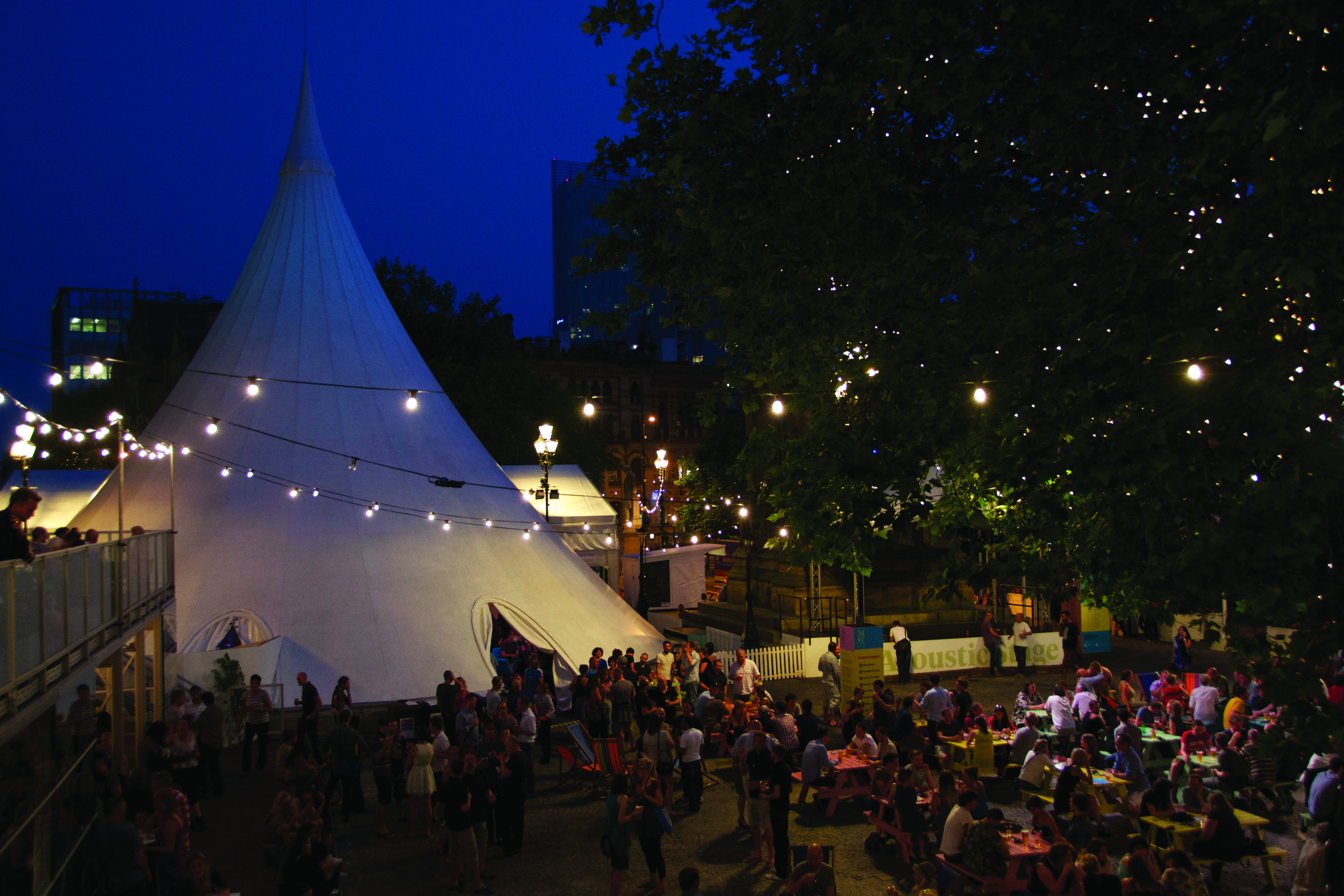
- The 2013 Manchester International Festival pavilion at night in Albert Square
- Status: Active
- Genre: Festival
- Dates: July (dates vary)
- Frequency: Biennial
- Venue: Multiple across Manchester
- Locations: Manchester, UK
- Coordinates: 53°29′0.4413″N 02°14′52.0985″W
- Country: United Kingdom
- Years active: 19
- Inaugurated: 2007
- Founder: Alex Poots (Manchester City Council)
- Previous event: 3 July – 20 July 2025
- Next event: 2027
- Attendance: 325,000 (2023)
- Area: International
- Leader: John McGrath (Artistic Director)
- Filing status: Registered charity
- People: John McGrath; Sheena Wrigley; Karen Bass; Low Kee Hong; Scott McVittie
- Sponsor: Various
- Website: factoryinternational.org

The Manchester International Festival is a biennial international arts festival, with a specific focus on original new work, held in the English city of Manchester and run by Factory International. The festival is a biennial event, first taking place in June–July 2007, and subsequently recurring in the summers of 2009, 2011, 2013, 2015, 2017, 2019, 2021, 2023 with the most recent event taking place in the summer of 2025. The organisation was originally based in Blackfriars House, adjacent to Blackfriars Bridge but it has since moved to a new £110 million new home, Factory International in 2023.

== Pre-festival commissions ==
The Festival was promoted and initiated with three pre-festival commissions. The first of these took place in November 2005, when Gorillaz performed live at the Manchester Opera House. Recordings of these performances were later released as the Demon Days Live DVD. The second was The Schools Festival Song, a new piece by Ennio Morricone and Nicholas Royle sung by an 8,000-strong schools' choir, organised by Young Voices, which took place on 4 December 2006.

The third was an art installation, in conjunction with the Imperial War Museum, by Turner Prize-winning artist Steve McQueen, as a response to the 2003 Iraq war and as a tribute to British service personnel killed in that conflict. It was exhibited in the Great Hall of Manchester Central Library from 28 February to 15 July 2007.

== MIF 07 ==
The first edition of the Festival ran from 28 June – 15 July 2007. The Festival's showpiece production was Monkey: Journey To The West, a re-working of the ancient Chinese legend Journey to the West by Damon Albarn and Jamie Hewlett, collaborating on their first major project since Gorillaz. Albarn wrote the score while Hewlett designed the set and costumes. Adapted and directed by Chen Shi-Zheng, whose credits range from classical Chinese opera to the Meryl Streep movie Dark Matter, the show also featured 45 Chinese circus acrobats, Shaolin monks and Chinese vocalists. The production was designed and created by Théâtre du Châtelet in co-operation with the Manchester International Festival and the Berlin State Opera, and performed at the Palace Theatre.

As well as Monkey, the Festival showcased two other events. The first was Il Tempo del Postino, a visual arts show curated by Hans Ulrich Obrist and Philippe Parreno and produced in conjunction with the Théâtre du Châtelet, Paris, performed at the Manchester Opera House. The other was a new stage adaptation of The Pianist, combining the original words of Władysław Szpilman spoken by actor Peter Guinness, with the music of Frédéric Chopin performed by leading pianist Mikhail Rudy, and directed by Neil Bartlett at the Museum of Science and Industry in Manchester.

=== Finance for MIF 07 ===
Funding for the 2007 festival
Source of funding	Amount £m ( % of all funding )
Manchester City Council	2.3(26%)
Other public funding (including Arts Council)	1.4(16%)
Sponsorship	3.3(37%)
Other funding	0.5(6%)
Ticket sales	1.3(15%)
Total amount = £8.8m

Expenditure for the 2007 festival
Source of expenditure	Amount £m ( % of all funding )
Artistic programme	5.5(61%)
Marketing and press	1.1(13%)
Festival operations	2.4(27%)
Total amount = £9.0m

The 2007 festival made a £0.2m loss (£8.8m worth of funding minus £9.0m expenditure), which was made up by the council's contingency and made up in the 2009 festival.

The economic impact to the region was £28.8m.

== MIF 09 ==
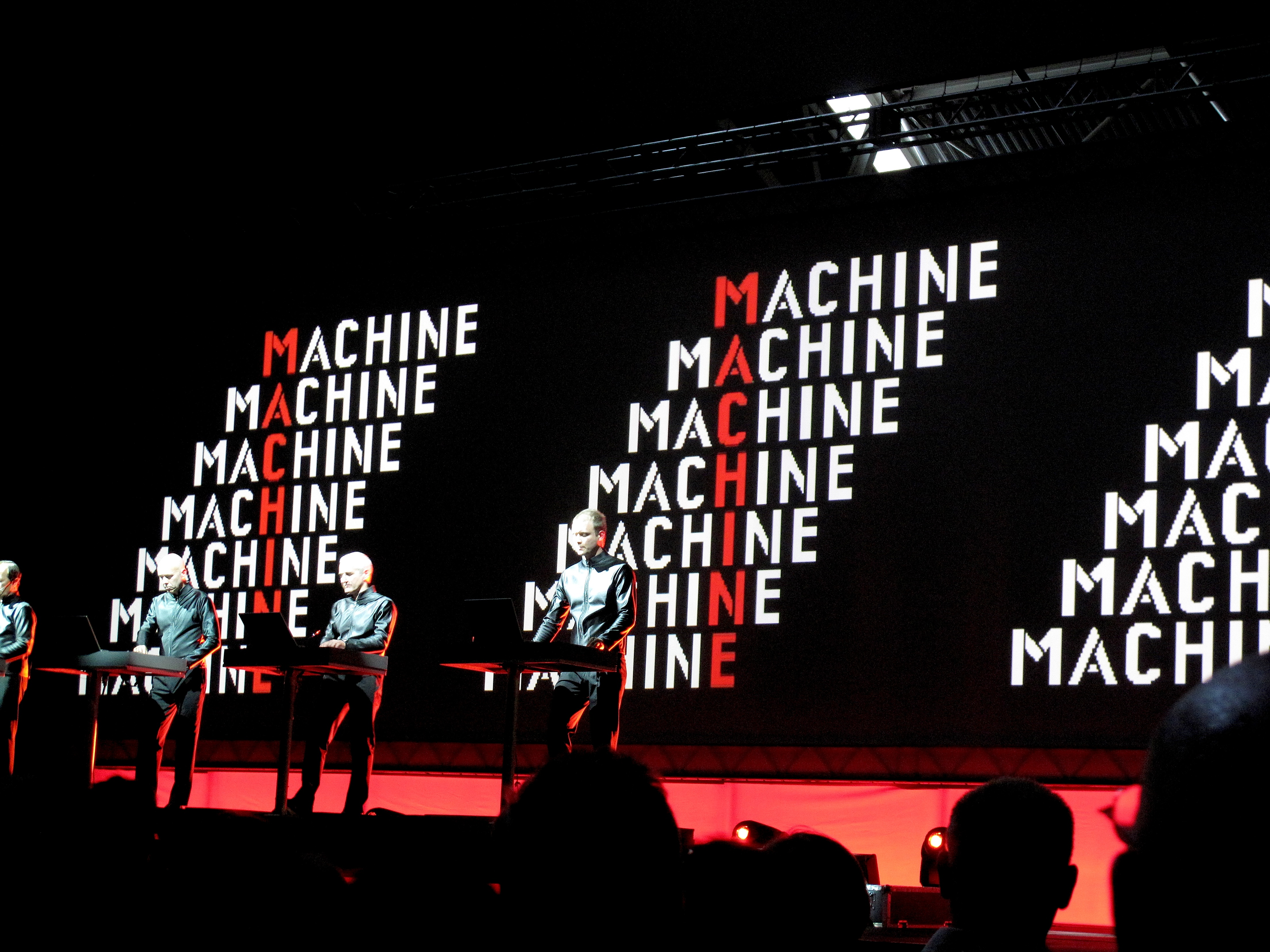
Kraftwerk with special guest Steve Reich playing at Manchester Velodrome

The 2009 Manchester International Festival took place between 2–19 July 2009; in October 2008, a press release announced the first three commissions for 2009. These werePrima Donna, Rufus Wainwright's debut opera, Everybody Loves a Winner, a "new theatrical experience" by director Neil Bartlett, and a "unique environment within Manchester Art Gallery" for solo piano, violin and cello JS Bach works called the JS Bach Chamber Music Hall, created by Zaha Hadid Architects.

The entire festival programme featuring more than 20 commissions was announced in March 2009. It included a Kraftwerk and Steve Reich commission performed at the Manchester Velodrome, performance art by Marina Abramović at the Whitworth Art Gallery, a procession along Deansgate organised by Jeremy Deller and a collaboration between Elbow and The Hallé orchestra. Manchester alternative rock band Epiphany are also appearing as part of the procession. The festival also featured It Felt Like A Kiss, a multimedia production created by documentary-maker Adam Curtis, Damon Albarn and Punchdrunk theatre company.

Other artists included De La Soul, Lou Reed and Laurie Anderson, Antony and the Johnsons with the Manchester Camerata, Carlos Acosta and The Durutti Column, performing a tribute to the late Tony Wilson.

=== Finance for MIF 09 ===
Funding for the 2009 festival
Source of funding	Amount £m ( % of all funding )
Manchester City Council	2.2(23%)
Other public funding (including Arts Council)	1.6(17%)
Sponsorship	2.9(30%)
Other funding	1.3(14%)
Ticket sales	1.5(16%)
Total amount = £9.5m

Expenditure for the 2009 festival
Source of expenditure	Amount £m ( % of all funding )
Artistic programme	6.2(67%)
Marketing and press	1.2(13%)
Festival operations	1.9(20%)
Total amount = £9.3m

The 2009 festival made a £0.2m profit (£9.5m worth of funding minus £9.3m expenditure), which made up the £0.2m deficit incurred by the 2007 festival.

The economic impact to the region was £35.9m.

== MIF 11 ==
The 2011 edition of the Festival ran from 30 June to 17 July 2011 and staged 27 original projects, featuring artists and performers such as Björk, Damon Albarn, Snoop Dogg, Marina Abramović, Victoria Wood, WU LYF, D/R/U/G/S and Air Cav, along with the Punchdrunk's Doctor Who production The Crash of the Elysium. Manchester International Festival's director Alex Poots stated that "the most important thing for us to do is make an artistically and culturally important festival that is of the highest quality". The abolition of the Northwest Regional Development Agency, which contributed £900,000 to the 2009 festival, resulted in a loss of funding for 2011's Manchester International Festival.

Björk began the MIF11, with the live debut of her new album Biophilia, with Dave Simpson of The Guardian stating that she "provided a stunning visual display", adding that "the Icelandic singer made a typically eye-popping entrance on huge platform shoes and sporting blue and white facepaint". Sinéad O'Connor also performed at the festival, earning favourable reviews.

Damon Albarn debuted his opera Doctor Dee, based on the life of Elizabethan scientist and philosopher John Dee, at the Palace Theatre. Directed by Rufus Norris, the production was described as "by no means an opera in the conventional sense" by The Guardian's Alfred Hickling, who described Dr Dee as "an erudite affair", giving it four stars.

=== Finance for MIF 11 ===
Funding for the 2011 festival
Source of funding	Amount £m ( % of all funding )
Manchester City Council	2.4(21%)
Other public funding (including Arts Council)	2.0(18%)
Sponsorship	2.4(21%)
Other funding	2.9(26%)
Ticket sales	1.6(14%)
Total amount = £11.3m

Expenditure for the 2011 festival
Source of expenditure	Amount £m ( % of all funding )
Artistic programme	7.7(69%)
Marketing and press	1.6(14%)
Festival operations	1.9(17%)
Total amount = £11.2m

The 2011 festival made a £0.1m profit (£11.3m worth of funding minus £11.2m expenditure).

The economic impact to the region was £37.6m.

== MIF 13 ==
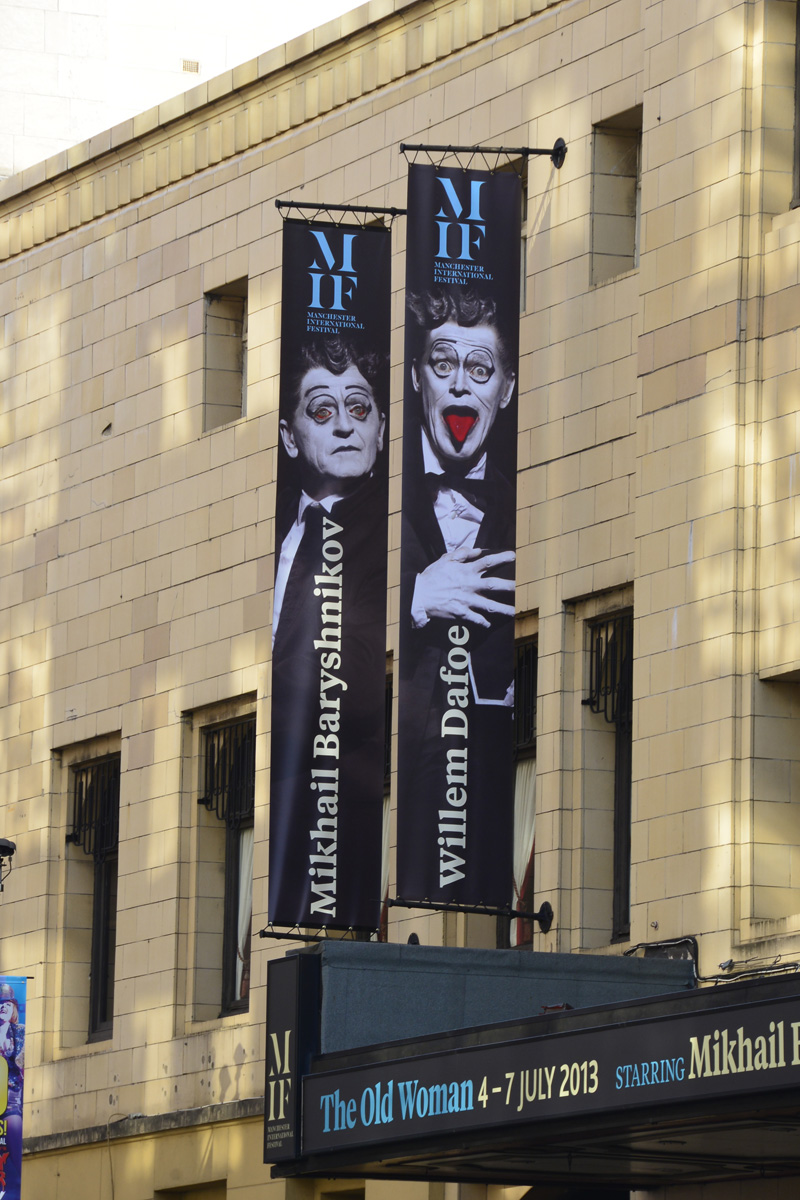
The Old Woman at the Palace Theatre, Manchester

The festival returned in 2013 and ran from 4 to 21 July attracting an estimated quarter of a million attendees, generating £40 million for the city of Manchester. The 18-day Festival included over 300 performances of more than 30 new commissions and special events which included collaborations with artists such as Maxine Peake, Kenneth Branagh, The xx, Massive Attack and Tino Sehgal.

Rob Ashford and Kenneth Branagh directed a new adaptation of Macbeth at the Church of St Peter in Ancoats. Branagh starred as Macbeth alongside Alex Kingston as Lady Macbeth in a performance which The Daily Telegraph's Dominic Cavendish described as "a thrilling and cinematically fluid production" in his five star review. The production was co-commissioned with New York's Park Avenue Armory where it played to rave reviews in May and June 2014. During the shows run at MIF13, Macbeth was broadcast to cinemas around the world by National Theatre Live.

One of the main events was Massive Attack vs Adam Curtis, a collaborative performance from Massive Attack's Robert Del Naja and Bafta-winning filmmaker Adam Curtis which took place in the Mayfield Depot. Robert Wilson directed Mikhail Baryshnikov and Willem Dafoe in a surrealist adaptation of Daniil Kharms' short story The Old Woman at the Palace Theatre.

MIF13 introduced a members scheme which granted people access to priority booking for the most highly anticipated events. Also new was a £12 ticket scheme, allowing Greater Manchester residents on lower incomes access to more events after festival organisers acknowledged some tickets were out of the reach of local residents on lower wages. Manchester City Council provided £2 million in funding and the festival boosted the local economy by £38 million.

=== Finance for MIF 13 ===
Funding for the 2013 festival
Source of funding	Amount £m ( % of all funding )
Manchester City Council	2.5(21%)
Other public funding (including Arts Council)	1.5(13%)
Sponsorship	3.0(25%)
Other funding	3.5(29%)
Ticket sales	1.4(12%)
Total amount = £11.9m

Expenditure for the 2013 festival
Source of expenditure	Amount £m ( % of all funding )
Artistic programme	7.9(67%)
Marketing and press	1.6(13%)
Festival operations	2.4(20%)
Total amount = £11.9m

The 2013 festival broke even (£11.9m worth of funding minus £11.9m expenditure).

The economic impact to the region was £38m.

== MIF 15 ==
Manchester International Festival returned in 2015 and ran from 2 to 19 July.

On 19 November 2014 Manchester International Festival announced the first three new commissions for MIF15. Tree of Codes is a new contemporary ballet directed and choreographed by Wayne McGregor with music composed by Jamie xx and visual concept by Olafur Eliasson. The performance, took place 2–10 July 2015 at Manchester Opera House, was inspired by the book Tree of Codes by Jonathan Safran Foer and featured soloists and dancers from The Paris Opera Ballet. The Tale of Mr Tumble a new theatre show for young children and families; Justin Fletcher invited audiences to step inside the colourful world of one of the most cherished TV characters, the show took place at Manchester Opera House from the 11–19 July. Manchester International Festival announced their full line-up in spring 2015.

On 21 January 2015, it was announced that the next MIF15 commission would be Wonder.land, a new musical with music by Damon Albarn, book and lyrics by Moira Buffini and that it would be directed by Rufus Norris. Wonder.land is inspired by Alice In Wonderland by Lewis Carroll and is a co-production with The National Theatre. It was performed at the Palace Theatre, Manchester from the 29th of June to 12 of July 2015. Wonder.land will tour to the National Theatre opening on Monday 23 November 2015 and running into 2016.

The 2015 festival had initially been expected to attract 250,000 visitors, however the end figure was 259,648.

=== Finance for MIF 15 ===
Funding for the 2015 festival
Source of funding	Amount £m ( % of all funding )
Manchester City Council	2.7(22%)
Arts Council of England	1.4(12%)
Sponsorship	2.7(23%)
Co-producers	0.8(7%)
Other funding	2.9(24%)
Ticket sales	1.5(12%)
Total amount = £12m

Expenditure for the 2015 festival
Source of expenditure	Amount £m ( % of all funding )
Artistic programme	8.1(68%)
Operating costs (incl. marketing and press)	3.9(32%)
Total amount = £12m

The 2015 festival broke even (£12m worth of funding minus £12m expenditure).

The economic impact to the region was £38.8m.

In November 2014 it was announced that Alex Poots, Manchester International Festival's founding director, would be stepping down from his role after MIF 15. Poots left to take on the role of chief executive of the Culture Shed in New York. In May 2015 it was announced that Poots would be succeeded in 2015 by John McGrath, the Artistic Director of National Theatre Wales.

2016

The festival announced a co-production of Giselle between themselves English National Ballet and Sadler's Wells Theatre to be directed by Akram Khan and performed at the Palace Theatre, Manchester in September. The production will then go on tour to Bristol Hippodrome, the Mayflower Theatre, Southampton and Sadler's Wells Theatre, London later in the year.

== MIF 17 ==
The 2017 Manchester International Festival took place from 29 June to 16 July. The first four commissions were announced in autumn 2016, together with a creative community programme called "My Festival".

The festival opened with a parade of disparate individuals from Manchester on a runway in Piccadilly Gardens, "What Is the City but the People?", and closed with a celebration of the installation of a statue of Friedrich Engels in Tony Wilson Place, outside HOME. Major productions included Fatherland, created by Frantic Assembly's Scott Graham, musician Karl Hyde and playwright Simon Stephens; Jane Horrocks' Cotton Panic!, telling the story of the Cotton Famine; and New Order performing with a 12-piece synthesiser ensemble from the Royal Northern College of Music, a show entitled Σ(No,12k,Lg,17Mif) produced in collaboration with artist Liam Gillick.

In all, 380 performances of 32 commissions and events took place over 18 days, with a record 300,000 visitor count.

== MIF 19 ==
The 2019 Manchester International Festival took place from 4 to 21 July. The opening event was a collaborative bell-ringing event created by Yoko Ono. Other productions announced in late 2018 include Tree, a musical work about South Africa, by Idris Elba and Kwame Kwei-Armah, and DYSTOPIA987, Skepta's vision of the future.

David Lynch will have a major presence at the festival, exhibiting his painting and sculpture, showing a series of his films and presenting three nights of shows by 'Lynch-inspired musicians', all at HOME. Maxine Peake, a regular at MIF, stars in a show about Nico, The Nico Project. A custom-built structure at the Science and Industry Museum will house Atmospheric Memory, a performance piece portraying speech in the air. Other artists appearing at or creating works for the festival include Chim-Pom, Abida Parveen, Ivo van Hove, Philip Glass, Tania Bruguera and Laurie Anderson.

=== Dispute over authorship of Tree ===
On 2 July 2019, The Guardian published a story describing how Tori Allen-Martin and Sarah Henley had been removed from their work on Tree under what they said were questionable circumstances. The two writers had worked on the project for four years. In 2015, Elba had asked them to develop his idea for a musical based on his album Idris Elba Presents mi Mandela, on which Allen-Martin had also collaborated. When Kwei-Armah joined the project in May 2018, he rewrote part of their material. Tree was later billed as "created by Idris Elba and Kwame Kwei-Armah". Allen-Martin and Henley described that their creative input had included research, scriptwriting as well as the play's title, and that they were threatened with legal action if they went public with the story. MIF issued a statement to counter their description of events, describing Tree as a new work based on an original script by Kwei-Armah that was entirely his creation.

== Factory International ==
Factory International is a £110 million theatre and arts venue built on the former site of Granada Studios, in the St John's Quarter of Manchester by Manchester Quays Ltd (MQL), a development partnership between Allied London and Manchester City Council, to be the permanent home of the Manchester International Festival. Its name comes from Factory Records, the independent record label founded by the late Tony Wilson. The venue, designed by Rem Koolhaas from the Office for Metropolitan Architecture (OMA), opened in 2023.

During the Manchester International Festival (MIF) in 2021, Factory International was used as a venue for 'Arcadia' an art installation, design by Deborah Warner, even though the construction works were not yet complete. The exhibition included recorded contributions from Simon Russell Beale, RoxXxan, Jane Horrocks, Brian Cox, Lioness, David Thewlis and many others.

=== Opening Programme ===
In September 2022, Factory International announced their opening programme for the building. It included Free Your Mind, an immersive Matrix films-themed dance, music and visual effects experience with a creative team including composer Michael ‘Mikey J’ Asante MBE and choreographer Kenrick ‘H2O’ Sandy MBE (founders of Boy Blue), artist Es Devlin, playwright and poet Sabrina Mahfouz and director Danny Boyle.^{[1]} The programme announcement also included You Me and the Balloons, the world's biggest ever show by Yayoi Kusama,^{[2]} and The Welcome, a series of special events and performances curated by the people of Greater Manchester.

== Notes ==
^{Note 1} The original timeline was as follows:
- May 2016 – planning application submission
- January 2017 to December 2018 – construction
- January 2019 to June 2019 – commissioning of facilities and test events
- July 2019 – opening ceremony

Reference to Note 1

- Manchester City Council (29 July 2015). Executive meeting: 16. The Factory Manchester: Project Delivery (Report). Manchester City Council. pp. 222–224. point 5.0. Pdf.
