= St John's, Manchester =

Coordinates: 53.478958°N 2.254783°W

St John's
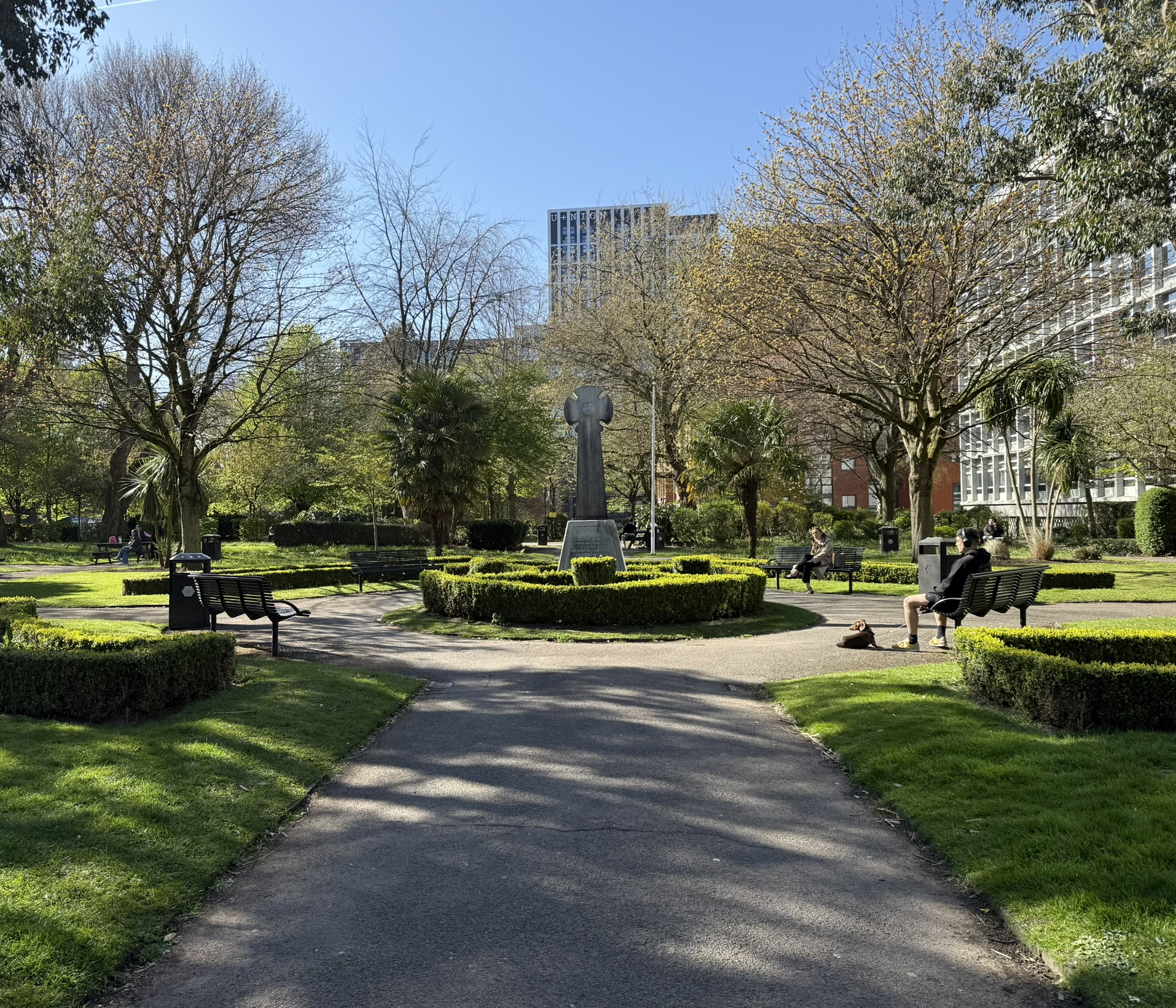
- St John's Gardens within St John's, Manchester in April 2025

- Location within Greater Manchester
- OS grid reference: SJ8318898056
  - London: 163 miles (263 km) SE
- Metropolitan borough: City of Manchester
- Metropolitan county: Greater Manchester
- Region: North West
- Country: England
- Sovereign state: United Kingdom
- Post town: MANCHESTER
- Dialling code: 0161
- Police: Greater Manchester
- Fire: Greater Manchester
- Ambulance: North West
- UK Parliament: Manchester Central

St John's is a proposed £1 bn development of a 6 hectare plot within central Manchester, England. The site is being developed by Manchester Quays Ltd (MQL), a partnership between Manchester City Council and Allied London.

== Development ==
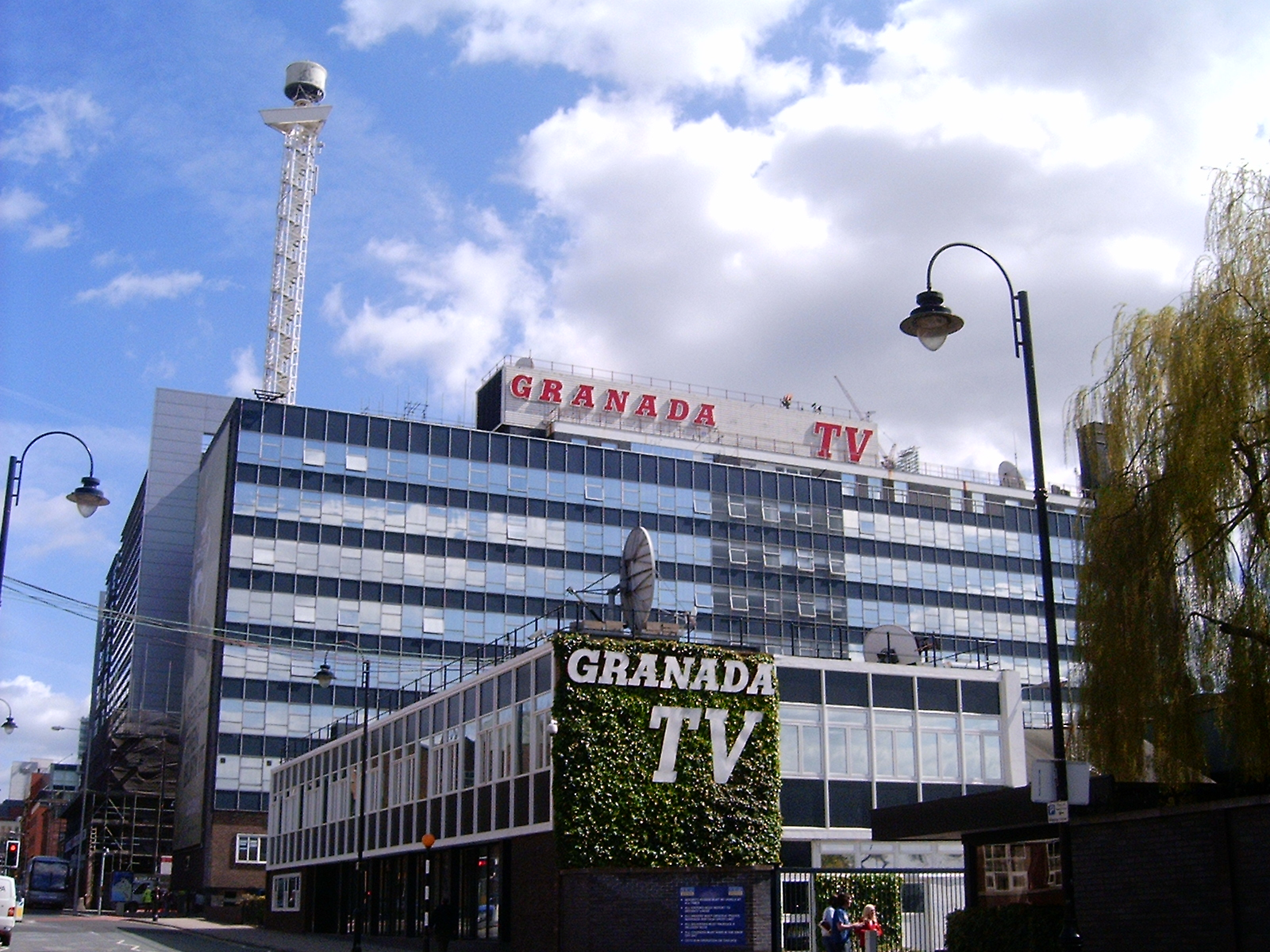
The new Granada Hotel will have a red neon sign similar to the original TV station

The development will see up to 2,500 homes, up to 600,000 sq ft of workspace, mostly aimed at creative industries, (80,000 sq ft of this via refurbishment of the Bonded Warehouse), up to 400,000 sq ft of leisure space, incorporating some of the existing entertainment and studio buildings. The development will be on the former site of Granada Studios but it will extend as far as the Museum of Science and Industry and the Marriott Hotel on Water Street.

SimpsonHaugh and Partners are behind the masterplan which will also see two fifty storey towers and three hotels, including the Granada Hotel incorporating the iconic red neon 'Granada TV' sign.

== Factory International ==
The development will feature a new £110 million theatre and arts venue called Factory International. Its name comes from Factory Records, the independent record label founded by the late Tony Wilson. The flexible space will provide a permanent home to the Manchester International Festival.

The £9.5m design contracts were put out to tender in July 2015. The successful company named by the council in November 2015 was the Office for Metropolitan Architecture (OMA) with its lead designer Rem Koolhaas.

The entire space will cover approximately 13,300 m^{2} (143,000 sq ft) and will be flexible enough to accommodate combined audiences of up to 7,000, although it is envisaged that it will operate mainly as a 1,600-seat theatre space plus a 5,000-capacity warehouse space.

The opening ceremony was planned for the end of 2019, though this was later revised to June 2023.
