= Sweet Dreams (installation) =

2024 installation artwork

- Promotional image featuring characters from the production
- Year: 2024
- Medium: Real-time graphics, Sculpture, Spatial Audio, Animation
- Location: Manchester, England

Sweet Dreams is a narrative-driven art installation by the art collective Marshmallow Laser Feast, directed by Simon Wroe with art direction by Matthieu Bessudo (also known as McBess). The production ran from July to September 2024 at the Factory International cultural space in Manchester, England. A year later part of the exhibition was opened for the Ars Electronica festival in Linz from September 3rd to 7th in the theme exhibition.

The production is presented in a walk-through audiovisual format, split into a series of rooms containing audiovisual screens, sculptures, lighting, and audio effects, and audience participation elements. It explores the nature of modern life's relationship with mass-produced food.

The work was commissioned by the British Film Institute and Factory International.

== Themes ==
Sweet Dreams explores themes from fast food advertising and the audience's relationship with food, particularly the contradiction between increased public awareness of the environmental consequences of food while enjoying a time of unprecedented consumerism.

== Cast ==
The animated and audiovisual portions of the production star the following:

- Munya Chawawa as Chicky Ricky, an anthropomorphic chicken and the long-term brand mascot of the fictional fast food chain Real Good Chicken.
- Morgana Robinson as Penny Peckish, a former sidekick of Ricky's, in the form of a rag doll with legs made of plastic straws, and The Ortolan.
- Reggie Watts as The Boss, the profit-obsessed manager of Real Good Chicken with a Rolodex for a head.

In addition, live Factory International staff act as Real Good Chicken representatives and guide the audience throughout the installation.

== Plot ==
The audience is guided into the installation, where a projected video screen introduces them to the "Real Good Chicken Company", a chain of fried chicken restaurants with a global reach. The video includes advertisements for the chain, which repeat the phrase "this is a chicken" and nonsensical positive-sounding phrases over many images of chickens.

The audience is then taken into a room containing artifacts and awards from RGC's long history, where they are introduced to Chicky Ricky (Munya Chawawa), the chain's long-standing cartoon chicken mascot. It is revealed that the chain struggles to retain relevance and income as consumers' eating habits change. Through further exposition on the chain's history, the audience is introduced to The Boss (Reggie Watts) who manages the chain, and Penny Peckish (Morgana Robinson), a sarcastic and jaded rag doll who is Ricky's former sidekick.

The audience is then invited to take part in a shift at RGC's cartoonish factory, operating (via push-button operating an audiovisual screen) machinery such as the "feather plucker", "head remover", and "chef's kiss". As the audience works, The Boss bemoans the chain's falling profits and insists that the audience work harder and harder - instead of breaks, audiences are instead given five-second opportunities to scream into a "screaming tube" and platitudes from "The Guru", who appears only as a blue light. As profits continue to fall, The Boss concludes that Ricky is outdated, and must be replaced with branding that reflects what consumers 'want'.

The audience is taken into Ricky's nightmare, where he sees his own funeral. The audience is invited to throw sachets of salt on his grave. Penny, delivering the eulogy, becomes sidetracked and distressed by the idea of a mascot who is a chicken that promotes eating chicken - other mascots appear to demonstrate the strangeness of the premise. Ricky awakens to find that his nightmare has come true - he is 'off the bucket'. Dejected, he observes the world to see how customers' response to food advertising has changed significantly from the time he was introduced; he is surprised that the UK's fastest-growing chain, 'Food Bank', has no mascot at all.

Ricky ventures into the Real Good Chicken factory's research department to find what customers 'really want'. The audience is inundated with challenging questions about their attitude to food, and is introduced to The Ortolan, a songbird eaten whole as a delicacy. He joins the audience in reflecting on what customers want from their relationship with food, theorising that those who eat Ortolans - something that causes bleeding from the mouth due to their sharp bones - want most to taste themselves.

The audience is then taken to a room with yoga mats laid on the floor. The Guru offers relaxing platitudes to soothe complex thoughts arising from the previous room's questions. Ricky appears on a screen, where he questions why RGC can't return to selling 'good, wholesome food' - he is admonished by The Guru for believing that it was ever that way. The Guru recommends how he should adapt to the modern world, such as being replaced by the nonsensical slogan 'Be More Nugget'.

Ricky decides that he would rather be a free chicken. In the final room, the audience sees Ricky as an ordinary chicken in a green field with a hopper of grain. He tries the grain, finding it dry. Slowly noticing a Real Good Chicken billboard behind him, he nervously turns to the audience and asks, "Anybody got any ketchup?"

== Reception ==
Reviews of Sweet Dreams were mixed to positive. Creative Review found the production witty, yet on-the-nose, whilst local review site I Love Manchester found the experience "astonishing".
