= Wang Liulang =

- Short story by Pu Songling
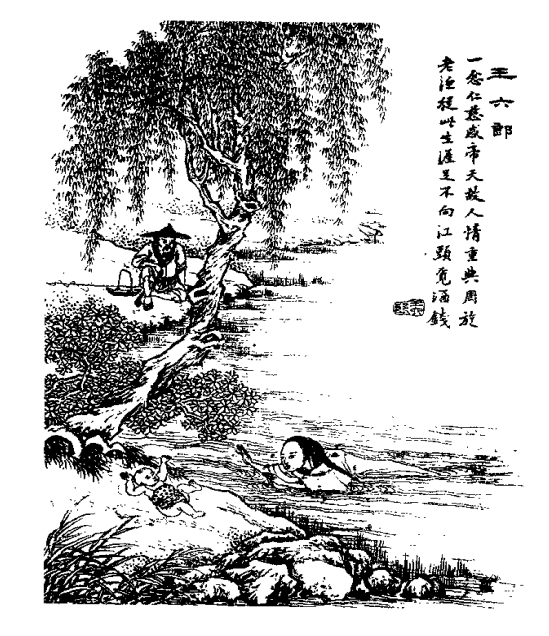
- Illustration from Xiangzhu liaozhai zhiyi tuyong (Liaozhai Zhiyi with commentary and illustrations; 1886)
- Original title: 王六郎 (Wang Liulang)
- Country: China
- Language: Chinese
- Genres: Zhiguai; Chuanqi; Short story

Publication
- Published in: Strange Tales from a Chinese Studio
- Media type: Print (Book)
- Publication date: 1740

Chronology
House Demons (宅妖)	Stealing Peaches (偷桃)

"Wang Liulang" (Chinese: 王六郎; pinyin: Wáng Liùláng), also translated as "Sixth Brother Wang", is a short story by Pu Songling first published in Strange Tales from a Chinese Studio. The story follows a Chinese fisherman's friendship with the title character, a water spirit who has to drown a human being in the river in which he is imprisoned, in order to be reincarnated.

== Plot ==
One evening, a successful Zichuan fisherman named Xu (许) befriends a man who introduces himself as Wang Liulang (王六郎). Wang assists Xu with his fishing, ensuring that he has a more bountiful catch, and the two men spend the next six months fishing and drinking together in the evening; but one day Wang bids Xu farewell and reveals that he is in fact the ghost of an alcoholic who had drowned in the river and is set to be reincarnated the following day. He also tells Xu that a woman is slated to take his place by drowning in the river at noon. The next day, Xu spots a woman with a baby about to cross the river at noon; sure enough, she slips and both mother and baby fall into the river. However, they safely make it to the shore. Wang later confesses to Xu that he could not bring himself to ruin two lives.

Some time afterwards, as a reward for his compassionate act, Wang is appointed as a minor deity in Zhaoyuan. On hearing this, Xu travels there and is greeted by villagers whose dreams have foretold of his coming. After paying his respects to Wang at the village temple, Xu is visited by him in his dreams. Xu's family becomes more prosperous and he retires from fishing; years later, Wang continues to be venerated by the locals.

In his postscript, Pu comments on the fragility of friendships and briefly narrates about a destitute villager who travelled a thousand li to call upon a childhood friend who had become a high-ranking official, only to be rebuffed.

== Publication history ==
Originally titled "Wang Liulang" (王六郎; literally "Wang the Sixth Lad"), the story was first published in Pu Songling's anthology of close to five hundred short stories, Strange Tales from a Chinese Studio or Liaozhai Zhiyi. Allan Barr writes that it was probably part of the opening volume of ghost stories (c. 1670s–1683) in the original eight-volume incarnation of Strange Tales. The story has been translated into English, including in the first volume of Sidney L. Sondergard's Strange Tales from Liaozhai (2008) as "Sixth Brother Wang".

== Themes and analysis ==
Tina Lu writes that the central theme of the story is personal identity—"the question of what a person is, from the specific perspective of the supernatural." She also notes that Pu is alluding to "one of the most famous passages from Mencius" on compassion and human nature:

When I say all people cannot bear the sufferings of others, what I mean is this: now when people see a baby suddenly about to fall into a well, they all feel a sense of fear and pity.

— Mencius as translated by Lu (2001)

Mencius argues that the hypothetical and innately compassionate bystander observing the baby's fall is prompted to act by a "spontaneous sense of fellow-feeling"; Wang Liulang is not only driven by fellow-feeling, but also stands to lose his life by forgoing a chance at reincarnation. Lu suggests that Pu is questioning if Wang—who is not biologically human but displays much humanity by sparing the mother and child—should be regarded as more legitimate of a person than "people who are biologically human but not morally so".

Ian McGreal cites Wang Liulang as "a very good example of a virtuous ghost", while a reviewer for Asiaweek writes that Pu is promoting "friendships that are based on unreserved self-abnegation". Allan Barr comments that Pu satirises "the inconstancy of human ties" with his presentation of a "loyal friendship between a man and a ghost", comparing it with similarly satirical Strange Tales entries as "Planting a Pear Tree", "The Snake Man", and "Three Lives".

== Adaptations ==
Based on Pu's short story and produced by the Beijing-based Theater San Tuoqi, the play Aquatique (水生) was first performed in July 2012 at the Théâtre Golovine in Avignon, France as part of the 66th Avignon Theatre Festival. It made its debut in China in January 2013.
