= Sansheng =

Sansheng or San sheng may refer to:

== Places ==
- Sansheng, Chongqing, a town in Beibei District, Chongqing, China
- Sansheng, Hubei, a village in Jianli County, Hubei
- Sansheng Township, Shimen County, Hunan, China
- Sansheng Subdistrict, Jinjiang District, Chengdu, Sichuan, China

== Others ==
- Three Departments (三省; Sān shěng), a top-level administration of middle and late imperial China
- "Three Lives" (short story) (三生; Sānshēng), a short story by Pu Songling from Strange Tales from a Chinese Studio (Volume 1)
- "Three Incarnations" (三生; Sānshēng), a short story by Pu Songling from Strange Tales from a Chinese Studio (Volume 10)

== See also ==
- Three Lives (disambiguation)
