= Huang Jiulang =

- Short story by Pu Songling
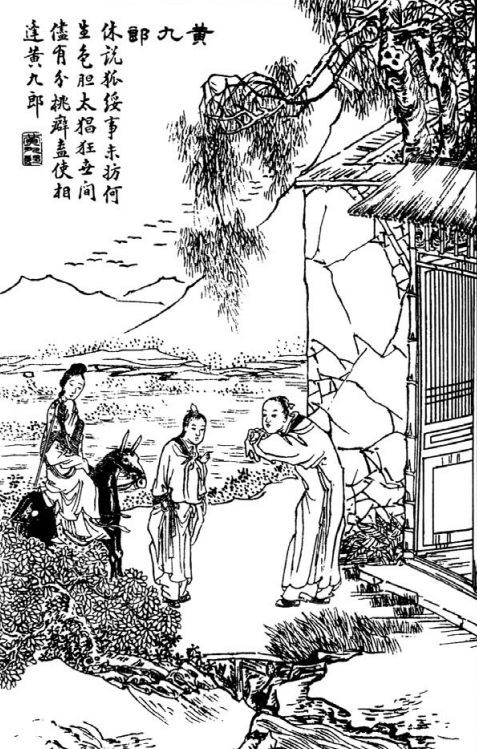
- 19th-century illustration from Xiangzhu liaozhai zhiyi tuyong (Liaozhai Zhiyi with commentary and illustrations; 1886)
- Original title: 黄九郎 (Huang Jiulang)
- Translator: John Minford
- Country: China
- Language: Chinese
- Genres: Zhiguai; Romance

Publication
- Published in: Strange Stories from a Chinese Studio
- Publication type: Anthology
- Publication date: c. 1740
- Published in English: 2006

Chronology
| Li Boyan (李伯言) | Ginling Girl (金陵女子) |

"Huang Jiulang" (Chinese: 黄九郎; pinyin: Huáng Jiǔláng) is a short story by Pu Songling first published in the third volume of Strange Stories from a Chinese Studio. The story features He Shican, a homosexual studio owner who becomes smitten with Huang Jiulang, a fox spirit, and their subsequent lives as a reborn government official and the lover of another gay official, respectively. "Huang Jiulang" is notable for being a full-length narrative on homosexuality in China; one of its English translated titles, "Cut Sleeve", alludes to Emperor Ai of Han's same-sex relationship with Dong Xian.

== Background ==
Pu Songling was a Qing dynasty author active in the seventeenth century. Homosexuality in China was regarded as a taboo and "off-centre" practice. Chinese society saw homosexuality as an "illness (...) (or) addiction (癖) over which one does not have control" that stemmed from "sexual frustration or sense of inferiority".

An oft-used euphemism during Pu's time for male homosexuality was "cut-sleeve", a reference to "the passion of the cut sleeve" between Liu Xin, better known as Emperor Ai of Han, and Han politician Dong Xian. According to History of the Han, the emperor, upon finding Dong sleeping on his sleeve, and having been called to a meeting while lying with his lover, cut off his sleeve rather than stir the man from his sleep.

== Plot ==
A mule-riding middle-aged woman and a young man pass by a studio. The studio's owner He Shican (何师参), a homosexual, straight away falls in love with the boy, whom he describes as "a quite extraordinary personal beauty". The next day, a besotted He bumps into the boy, who later on introduces himself as Huang Jiulang (黄九郎). The two develop a friendship and upon inviting him into his residence for a drink, He makes known his affection for Huang. However, his sexual advances towards Huang are unsuccessful and the latter leaves. He is crestfallen and becomes emaciated. Huang soon learns of this; revealing that he too is gay, he reluctantly agrees to copulate with He, on the condition that he procures some medicine for Huang's ailing mother.

He Shican's condition improves, but he learns from his doctor that he has been possessed, with his life on the line. Huang confirms that he is a fox spirit but He remains incredulous. Shortly after He's health deteriorates rapidly and he dies, leaving Huang devastated. Simultaneously, court censor Gong commits suicide with his wife, in fear of the corrupt Provincial Treasurer of Shaanxi, Wang, whom he was a fierce critic of. He’s spirit occupies the dead official's body; incidentally, Gong was also He's childhood familiar. Wang, now Governor, learns of this resurrection and starts to hound him. He Shican desperately returns to Huang, wanting to rekindle their romance. Huang refuses and instead refers He to his female cousin, whom he instantly takes a liking to.

Yet the threat of the Shaanxi governor remains and He beseeches Huang to help him out, upon learning that Wang is homosexual as well. The governor receives Huang and is "utterly captivated"; he begins to obsess himself with Huang and his health is slowly sapped. Eventually he dies, and Huang inherits much of his wealth. Meanwhile, his cousin and He, apparently having become heterosexual, tie the knot. Complementing the tale is a "Jesting Judgement" by Pu Songling; the poem echoes Mengzi's belief that "(t)he coming together in sexual congress of man and woman is one of the great natural bonds in human relations."

== Reception ==
Most scholars of Chinese literature are in agreement that "Huang Jiulang" is both criticising and satirising homosexuality in China. Judith T. Zeitlin writes in Historian of the Strange that the story, which "has a fixed penchant for homosexuality", "starts to slip into comedy when as a reward for his devotion he is 'converted' to heterosexuality in his next incarnation". She then criticises Pu's appended poem as "an amazingly arcane and rather hostile parody in parallel prose on homosexual practices". John Minford, who translated the story in the Penguin edition of Strange Stories from a Chinese Studio, takes the opposite conclusion, that the poem "pokes fun at the anti-homosexual lobby" by spoofing "pedantic neo-Confucian prudery". Finally, Stevenson and Wu (2012) consider that "on the surface [the tale is] poorly structured", and that Pu was ultimately unsuccessful in exploring one of the themes of greater importance in the story, that of the unseen, which concerns here both the supernatural and the unseen motivations of its characters. They recommend not drawing serious conclusions from the appended poem, whose title they translate as "Amusing Assessment". "Huang Jiulang" is frequently cited as a prominent example of homosexual erotica in Chinese literature; Xiao (1997) remarks that "Huang Jiulang's act of love ended up killing He Shican".

== Translations ==
The story is titled "Huang Jiulang" (黄九郎), after one of the main characters. It was translated into English by John Minford in 2006 as "Cut Sleeve"; one of the opening lines reveals that the protagonist He Shican is "of the Cut Sleeve persuasion". (Note: In Chinese: "何生素有断袖之癖。") Sidney L. Sondergard's translation of the story, released in 2008, is titled Huang the Ninth. The story was translated into Russian by Vasily Alekseyev in 1923.
