= Under the Veil =

Hong Kong television series

- Official poster
- Also known as: Double Fantasies
- 無雙譜
- Genre: Period drama, Romance, Fantasy
- Created by: Hong Kong Television Broadcasts Limited
- Written by: Cheung Chung-yan
- Directed by: Leung Yiu-kin, Cheng Wing-kei, Kwow Ka-hei, Lui Sui-lun
- Starring: Wayne Lai; Bosco Wong; Raymond Wong; Sonija Kwok; Kristal Tin; Eliza Sam; Katy Kung; Joseph Lee
- Theme music composer: Alan Cheung
- Opening theme: One and Only (獨一無二) by Vincy Chan
- Countries of origin: Hong Kong, China
- Original language: Cantonese
- No. of episodes: 20

Production
- Executive producer: Catherine Tsang
- Producer: Law Chun-ngok
- Production location: Hong Kong
- Editor: Siu Lei-king
- Camera setup: Multi camera
- Running time: 45 minutes (without commercials)
- Production company: TVB

Original release
- Network: TVB Jade, HD Jade
- Release: 28 September – 23 October 2015

Under the Veil
- Chinese: 無雙譜
- Literal meaning: "Double Fantasies"
Transcriptions
Standard Mandarin
- Hanyu Pinyin: Wú Shuāng Pǔ
Yue: Cantonese
- Yale Romanization: Mòuh Sēung Póu
- Jyutping: Mou4 Soeng1 Pou2

Under the Veil (Chinese: 無雙譜; Jyutping: Mou4 Soeng1 Pou2; Cantonese Yale: Mòuh Sēung Póu; literally "Have no equal in this world" etymology from Chinese idiom 舉世無雙) is a 2015 Hong Kong period, fantasy, comedy drama produced by TVB, starring Wayne Lai, Bosco Wong, Raymond Wong Ho-yin, Sonija Kwok, Kristal Tin and Eliza Sam as the main cast. Filming took place from January to April 2014. The drama was broadcast on Hong Kong's Jade and HD Jade channels from September 28 through October 23, 2015 every Monday through Friday during its 8:30-9:30 pm timeslot with a total of 20 episodes.

The drama is the second of TVB's four 2015 grand anniversary dramas to be broadcast.

Under the Veil is a remake of TVB's 1981 drama Double Fantasies (無雙譜), starring Louise Lee, Maggie Li, Andy Lau, Kent Tong.

== Synopsis ==
The drama is told in three separate folktales about love, lust, vanity, greed and selfishness.

Changing Pins

Male and female fraternal twins, with the same appearance, fall in love with different people. The older male twin has an affair with a Princess of the Liao Kingdom, while the female twin falls in love with a poor scholar with amnesia.

Duen Fung-Sam and Duen So-Sei are boy-girl twins from the royal Duen Family. Fung-Sam is the older of the twins who grew up with prince Sing-Chi. Sing-Chi suspects the old General Song Dak and his son are planning a rebellion against the emperor and are secretly contacting the Liao Kingdom. Sing-Chi ask Fung-Sam to help them gain evidence of their treachery by going undercover as a spy in Liao.

Fung-Sam gets close to the princess of Liao to gather intel and falls in love with her. After his success, the princess commits a suicide as an apology to her kingdom.

Fung-Sam returns with evidence: a secret letter written by Song-Dak to the king of Liao which states that if Song-Dak became the emperor, he would contribute the 16 States of Yanyun to Liao. Fung-Sam passes the evidence to prince Sing-Chi by using the flood-control system to avoid Song-Dak's spying.

When Sing-Chi and Fung-Sam are coming back to the capital by ships, they come under attack from Song-Dak's son, General Song-Lit. After the attack, only Fung-sam and the prince survives. However, Sing-Chi gets trapped in a cliff, and Fung-Sam comes back to the capital badly injured.

Meanwhile, So-Sei has been pretending to be her older brother to cover up his disappearance while he was in Liao and being treated for his injuries. So-Sei asks her master, who is also Fung-Sam's master, to save Fung-Sam. She falls in love with her childhood friend Yuen Sam-Yeung who is a poor artist.

Shi Loi-Fung, is a bird that used to be a princess of the Kucha Kingdom which used to pray to a devil. However, when the devil asked their group to contribute ten virgin boys and girls as sacrifices, they refused. In response, the devil destroyed the kingdom, with Princess Lap-ka surviving in the form of a statue. When the prince of the Song Dynasty, Chiu Sing-Chi, attempts to rescue her, Lap-ka transforms into a bird. She is renamed Shi Loi-Fung by Chiu Sing-Chi.

During the attack on the prince's ship, she was trying to rescue Sing-Chi against Song-Lit's wizard-craft but lost. Later, she enters Fung-Sam's dream, calling for reinforcement. Fung-Sam doesn't understand the bird language so he asks his master for help. With Loi-Fung's help, Fung-Sam and his master finally found the cliff and saved Sing-Chi from the cliff.

Song-Lit and his father were trying to sue Fung-Sam while he was having his injuries treated. However, So-Sei replaced her brother to prevent this from happening all along, which let Song-Lit know that So-Sei was standing in as her brother and Fung-Sam was hidden away. Song-Lit and his father received intel from Fung-Sam's reckless wife, Song-Dak's niece, and breaks into the place. Sou-Sei attempts to stop him from harming her brother but was struck by Song-Lit's dagger. Fung-Sam and his master came back from saving Sing-Chi's life to stop Song-Lit's further damage.

So-Sei died in her lover's arms. The secret letter was finally delivered to the Emperor King-Hei. Song-dak was put to trial, indicted for betrayal and sent to jail.

Chapter Story ends here.

Judge Lu

Chu Yi-Dan has an affair with Yat Pan-Heung, a courtesan who resembles his wife Se Wan Chi. He strikes a deal with Judge Lu to switch Pan Heung with Se Wan Chi. Judge Lu agrees and swaps the heads of the courtesan with Chu's wife. Initially living a carefree life, Chu Yi Dan soon realizes he loves and misses Se Wan Chi; Chu asks Judge Lu to swap the heads back, but the request soon turns into a headless murder investigation. The story is loosely based on Judge Lu.

Chasing Fish

A scholar becomes the object of affection to a fish spirit and human girl with the same face. The story is based on Yulan Ji.

== Cast ==
=== Main cast ===
- Kristal Tin as Dyun Fung-sam and Dyun So-sei, identical twins.
- Raymond Wong as Yuen Sam-yeung, a scholar, and Yuen-ngan Siu, Prince of Liao dynasty.
- Katy Kung as Lak-ka / Si Loi Fung, Princess of Kucha, whose spirit is trapped inside the body of a green bird.
- Wayne Lai as Chu Yi-dan, a scholar, and Hon Tin-lui, a hunter.
- Sonija Kwok as Yat Ban Heung, a courtesan, and Sheh Wan-chu, Chu Yi-dan's wife.
- Bosco Wong as Cheung Zan, a poor scholar.
- Eliza Sam as Lau Yi / Lee Yu, a koi spirit, and Hung Mau-dan, the daughter of a Grand Historian.
- Joseph Lee as Kau Tsin-Sui / Wu Gwei, an eight thousand year-old turtle, and Bau Ching, a justice officer.

=== Extended cast ===
- Stanley Cheung as Chiu Shing Chi, Crown Prince of Song dynasty.
- Raymond Chiu as Shong Lit, a general who practices sorcery and secretly betrays the Song dynasty. Shong Dak's son.
- Choi Kwok-Hing as Shong Dak, the main antagonist of Arc One. Shong Lit's father and Empress Shong's brother.
- Willie Wai as Judge Lu, the red faced deity of the underworld who holds the book of Life and Death.
- Mary Hon as Mrs. Dyun, mother of Dyun Fung-sam and Dyun So-sei.
- Joyce Koi as Guanyin
- Law Lok-lam
- Henry Lo as Miu Kwo Tin, Fung-sam and So-sei's martial arts instructor.
- Ali Lee as Zaak Sin, Dyun So-sei's maid.
- Henry Yu as Chiu King-hei, Emperor of Song dynasty (inspired by Emperor Zhao Zhen of Song).
- Chun Wong as Sheh Yin, Sheh Wan-chu's father.
- Rainbow Ching as Mok Shuet-fong, Sheh Wan-chu's mother.
- Dickson Lee as Kong Yiu-chu
- Sunny Tai as Ngau Pak-yip
- Cindy Lee as Yuen-ngan Man, Princess of Liao dynasty.
- Adam Ip
- Anthony Ho
- Koo Koon-chung
- Cecilia Fong as Empress Shong, Chiu King-hei's wife and Shong Dak's sister.
- Parkman Wong
- Janice Shum as Ha Hau-kuen, Dyun Fung-sam's wife.
- Eddie Ho
- Kong Fu Keung
- Kaka Chan
- Kayley Chung
- Osanna Chiu
- Lucy Li
- Rocky Cheng
- Alex Lam Tak Shun
- Kanice Lau
- Kiko Leung
- Darren Wong
- Kelvin Yuen
- Charles Fan
- Wong Kim Wai
- Hinson Chou
- Yeung Chiu Hoi (voice) of Daai Gam, Master Yue's pet golden bird who has a crush on Shi Loi Fung.

== Development ==
- In December 2013, TVB announced they will be remaking their 1981 drama Double Fantasies.
- The costume fitting ceremony was held on January 6, 2014 at 12:30 pm Tseung Kwan O TVB City Studio One.
- The blessing ceremony took place on February 11, 2014 at 3:00 pm Tseung Kwan O TVB City Studio Thirteen.
- Filming took place from January to April 2014, entirely on location in Hong Kong.
- In March 2014, Under the Veil was one of ten TVB dramas previewed at FILMART 2014.
- A promo image of Under the Veil was featured in TVB's 2015 calendar for the month of August.

== Viewership ratings ==
#	Timeslot (HKT)	Week	Episode(s)	Average points	Peaking points
1	Mon – Fri; 20:30–21:30	28 Sep –02 Oct 2015	1 — 5	23	27
2	Mon – Fri; 20:30–21:30	05 – 09 Oct 2015	6 — 10	24	--
3	Mon – Fri; 20:30–21:30	12 – 16 Oct 2015	11 — 15	24	--
4	Mon – Fri; 20:30–21:30	19 – 23 Oct 2015	16 — 20	25	29
Total average				24	29

== International broadcast ==
Network	Country	Airing Date	Timeslot
Astro On Demand	Malaysia	September 28, 2015	Monday - Friday 8:30 - 9:15 pm
TVBJ	Australia	September 28, 2015	Monday - Friday 11:30 pm – 12:30 am
Starhub TV	Singapore	January 21, 2016	Monday - Friday 8:00 - 9:00 pm

== Awards and nominations ==
Year	Ceremony	Category	Nominee	Result
2015	StarHub TVB Awards	My Favourite TVB Drama	Under the Veil	Nominated
2015	StarHub TVB Awards	My Favourite TVB Actor	Bosco Wong	Nominated
2015	StarHub TVB Awards	My Favourite TVB Actress	Eliza Sam	Nominated
2015	StarHub TVB Awards	My Favourite TVB Supporting Actress	Katy Kung	Nominated
2015	StarHub TVB Awards	My Favourite TVB Male TV Character	Bosco Wong	Nominated
2015	StarHub TVB Awards	My Favourite TVB Female TV Character	Eliza Sam	Won
2015	TVB Star Awards Malaysia	My Favourite TVB Drama Series	Under the Veil	Nominated
2015	TVB Anniversary Awards	TVB Anniversary Award for Best Drama	Under the Veil	Nominated
2015	TVB Anniversary Awards	TVB Anniversary Award for Best Actor	Bosco Wong	Nominated
2015	TVB Anniversary Awards	TVB Anniversary Award for Best Actress	Eliza Sam	Nominated
2015	TVB Anniversary Awards	TVB Anniversary Award for Best Supporting Actor	Joseph Lee	Nominated
2015	TVB Anniversary Awards	TVB Anniversary Award for Best Supporting Actress	Katy Kung	Nominated
2015	TVB Anniversary Awards	TVB Anniversary Award for Most Popular Male Character	Bosco Wong	Nominated
2015	TVB Anniversary Awards	TVB Anniversary Award for Most Popular Male Character	Joseph Lee	Nominated
2015	TVB Anniversary Awards	TVB Anniversary Award for Most Popular Female Character	Eliza Sam	Nominated
2015	TVB Anniversary Awards	TVB Anniversary Award for Favourite Drama Song	One and Only (獨一無二) by Vincy Chan	Nominated
