= Jakdan =

Chinese poet

Jakdan (Chinese: 扎克丹; pinyin: Zhākèdān) was a Qing dynasty Manchu translator and poet from the Plain Red Banner. He is most well known for his translation of Pu Songling's collection of supernatural stories titled Strange Tales from a Chinese Studio, though he also translated a number of other works, including seven volumes of translations of Chinese poetry and songs, to which he appended a volume of his own purely Manchu poetry.

== Name ==
Jakdan was from the Manchu Bujilgen clan. His courtesy name was Chinese: 秀峰; pinyin: Xiù fēng, and his pseudonym was Chinese: 五费居士; pinyin: Wǔ fèi jū shì. His Manchu personal name, Jakdan, means "Pine Tree".

== Life ==
The precise dates of Jakdan's birth and death are not known, but he was probably born in the 1780s. In 1826, when he was in his forties, he passed the translation examination for the Metropolitan Graduate, and was assigned to the post of Second Class Secretary of the Board of Works in Mukden (present-day Shenyang, the old Manchu capital).

== Poetry ==
The rare books collection at Harvard University's Yenching Library possesses the only known copy of an eight fascicle work by Jakdan titled Jabduha ucuri amtangga baita (simplified Chinese: 闲中佳趣; traditional Chinese: 閒中佳趣; pinyin: Xián zhōng jiā qù. The first seven fascicles contain 345 poems or songs translated from Chinese into Manchu, some of which appear to be Zidishu.

Bosson and Toh were the first to note that the eighth fascicle of Jabduha ucuri amtanggai baita did not contain translations, but rather original poetry. In 2010, Toh published a further analysis of two of the longer poems of the collection. Toh proposes a system of scansion wherein these two longer poems are divided into stanzas of varying numbers of lines, and lines of varying numbers of syllables, accompanied by end-rhyme and interrupted by non-prosodic phrases called chenzi simplified Chinese: 衬字; traditional Chinese: 襯字; pinyin: chènzì.
