= Jia Fengzhi =

- Short story by Pu Songling
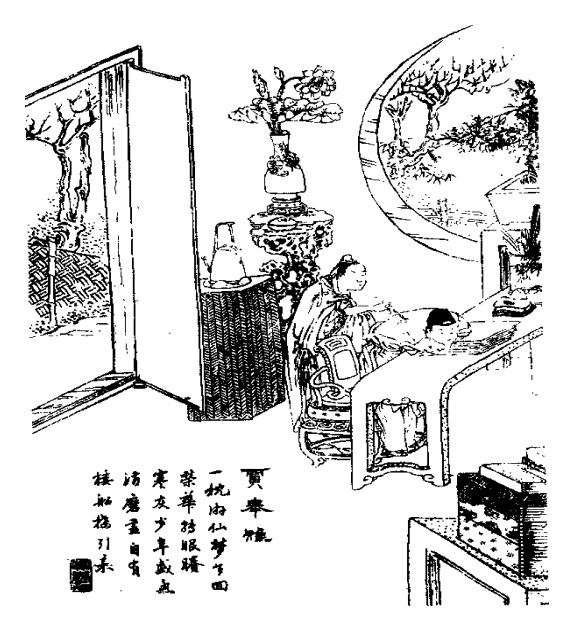
- Illustration from Xiangzhu liaozhai zhiyi tuyong (Liaozhai Zhiyi with commentary and illustrations; 1886)
- Original title: 賈奉雉 (Jia Fengzhi)
- Translator: Herbert Giles
- Country: China
- Language: Chinese
- Genres: Zhiguai; Chuanqi; Short story

Publication
- Published in: Strange Tales from a Chinese Studio
- Media type: Print (Book)
- Publication date: 1740
- Published in English: 1880

Chronology
Suqiu (素秋)	Shangxian (上仙)

"Jia Fengzhi" (simplified Chinese: 贾奉雉; traditional Chinese: 賈奉雉; pinyin: Jiǎ Fèngzhì) is a short story by Pu Songling first published in Strange Tales from a Chinese Studio. The story revolves around the eponymous scholar who, despite being intellectually gifted, struggles to pass the provincial examination until assisted by an immortal who befriends Jia while disguised as a fellow scholar. He unsuccessfully pursues an ascetic lifestyle, and returns to civilisation to discover that a century has elapsed, before becoming a bureaucrat. The story was first partly translated into English by British sinologist Herbert Giles, who described Jia as a "Chinese Rip Van Winkle".

== Plot ==
Jia Fengzhi (賈奉雉) is a brilliant scholar who constantly fails the provincial examination only because his essays are too profound for the examiners. One day, he encounters a xiucai named Lang (郎), whose erudite manner impresses Jia. The two men strike up a friendship, and Lang advises Jia to lower his literary standards in order to pass the examination; Jia refuses to do so and continues to languish. Three years later, Lang returns and poses to Jia a few topics to write essays on. However, he roundly criticises all of Jia's essays, prompting Jia to compose new ones using clichés and awkward phrases from his old writings. To his surprise, Lang tells him to memorise them and inscribes a fu on his back. During the actual examination, Jia regurgitates the substandard writing and becomes the top scorer. Disillusioned by the experience, Jia professes to become an ascetic, whereupon Lang takes him to his shifu, an elderly cave dwelling sage. Jia entreaties the master to accept him as his disciple, and is instructed to cultivate himself in the cave.

Following a brief encounter with a wild tiger, Jia is visited by an apparition of his wife, with whom he proceeds to make love. She disappears once the master returns; already aware of what has transpired, the master forces Lang to escort Jia out of the cave. Jia returns home but finds his neighbourhood virtually unrecognisable—reminiscent of the legend of Liu Chen and Ruan Zhao. Unaware of his identity, a village elder informs Jia that Jia Fengzhi had disappeared after becoming a juren, leaving behind his wife and their adolescent son; about a hundred years ago, when their son became a teenager, Jia's wife fell into a deep sleep and—following the death of their son—had been taken care of by her two impoverished grandchildren. A month ago, however, she had suddenly awoken from her century-long slumber. Upon hearing this, Jia reveals his identity. While his quinquagenarian grandchild, Jia Xiang (贾祥) is initially sceptical of the claim, his grandmother herself positively identifies her husband.

Jia's eldest granddaughter-in-law, Wu (吴), whose husband died a while ago, is filial to both Jia and his wife; in contrast, Jia Xiang and his family regard them with contempt. Angered by their offhandedness, Jia relocates to the countryside with his wife and settles down as a teacher. Some time later, Jia earns his jinshi degree, a few years after which he becomes appointed as a bureaucrat in Zhejiang. However, because he is impervious to bribery, many of his fellow court officials wish to sabotage him, and the Emperor repeatedly denies Jia's requests to return home. Meanwhile, Jia Xiang and his six sons misuse Jia Fengzhi's name to extort villagers of their land and money. One of Jia Xiang's sons kidnaps the bride of a Mou Yi (某乙) and Jia Fengzhi is implicated. Jia Fengzhi and Jia Xiang and his sons are captured and incarcerated; after a year, while still imprisoned, they all die of illness save Jia Fengzhi. Jia is released and sent to Luoyang; Jia's wife reunites with him after entrusting her xiucai great-grandson Jia Gao (贾杲)—one of her granddaughter-in-law Wu's two children—with the care of her seventeen-year-old son (i.e. Jia Gao's granduncle) whom she had conceived after relocating to the countryside with Jia Fengzhi. Now with his wife in Luoyang, Jia laments the misfortune in his life.

One day, while Jia is walking by the beach with his wife and their servants, a boatman beckons him to board his boat. Jia complies and the boat takes off, separating husband and wife. In exasperation, Jia's wife jumps into the ocean but is pulled up to the boat by the boatman using a thread of white satin. Jia recognises the boatman as Lang, and they disappear into the horizon. In his postscript, Pu remarks: "The fact that Jia felt ashamed and left the world suggests that that he had in him the making of an immortal. Yet he returned to the human world and degraded himself for the need of sustenance. To what extent indeed could poverty reduce a person!" (Note: In Chinese: "贾生因为科试的文章低劣而羞惭逃匿，这确实有隐者的风骨。当他重返人世，因为生活所迫，再次违心地参加应试，这说明贫贱对人的威胁实在太大了。")

== Publication history ==
Originally titled "Jia Fengzhi" (賈奉雉), the story was first published in Pu Songling's anthology of close to five hundred short stories, Strange Tales from a Chinese Studio or Liaozhai zhiyi. It was translated into English, albeit only partially, by British sinologist Herbert Giles and included in Strange Stories from a Chinese Studio (1880), which is widely regarded as the first substantial translation of Liaozhai. Describing Jia Fengzhi as a "Chinese Rip Van Winkle", Giles chose to only translate "such part of it (the story) as is remarkable for its similarity to Washington Irving's famous narrative" and criticised the rest of the story for being "long and tedious" and "devoid of interest". Giles makes a similar comment in A History of Chinese Literature (1927), alluding to "Jia Fengzhi" as a "Rip van Winkle story". A complete English translation was included in the fifth volume of Strange Tales from Liaozhai by Sidney Sondergard published in 2008.

== Themes and analysis ==
Several commentators have suggested that "Jia Fengzhi" is social commentary on the imperial examination system in China during Pu Songling's time. The pursuit of asceticism as an alternative to "examination hell" is a recurrent theme in Strange Tales, as seen in entries like "Jia Fengzhi", "A Sequel to the Yellow Millet Dream", and "The Island of Immortals"; Karl Kao writes that in contrasting the examinations with Taoism, Pu intended to satirise "examiners and impudent candidates" and that his postscript in "Jia Fengzhi" "betrays part of the reason of Pu's own continuous attempts to take the examination until an advanced age". Li Yu makes a similar argument, comparing "Jia Fengzhi" with another Strange Tales entry, "Student Ye", whose title character also has a brilliant mind but constantly fails his examinations. From 1660 to 1702, Pu failed the provincial examination ten times but pinned all the blame on "ignorant, incompetent, unfair and greedy examiners".
