= Traveller Tong =

- Short story by Pu Songling
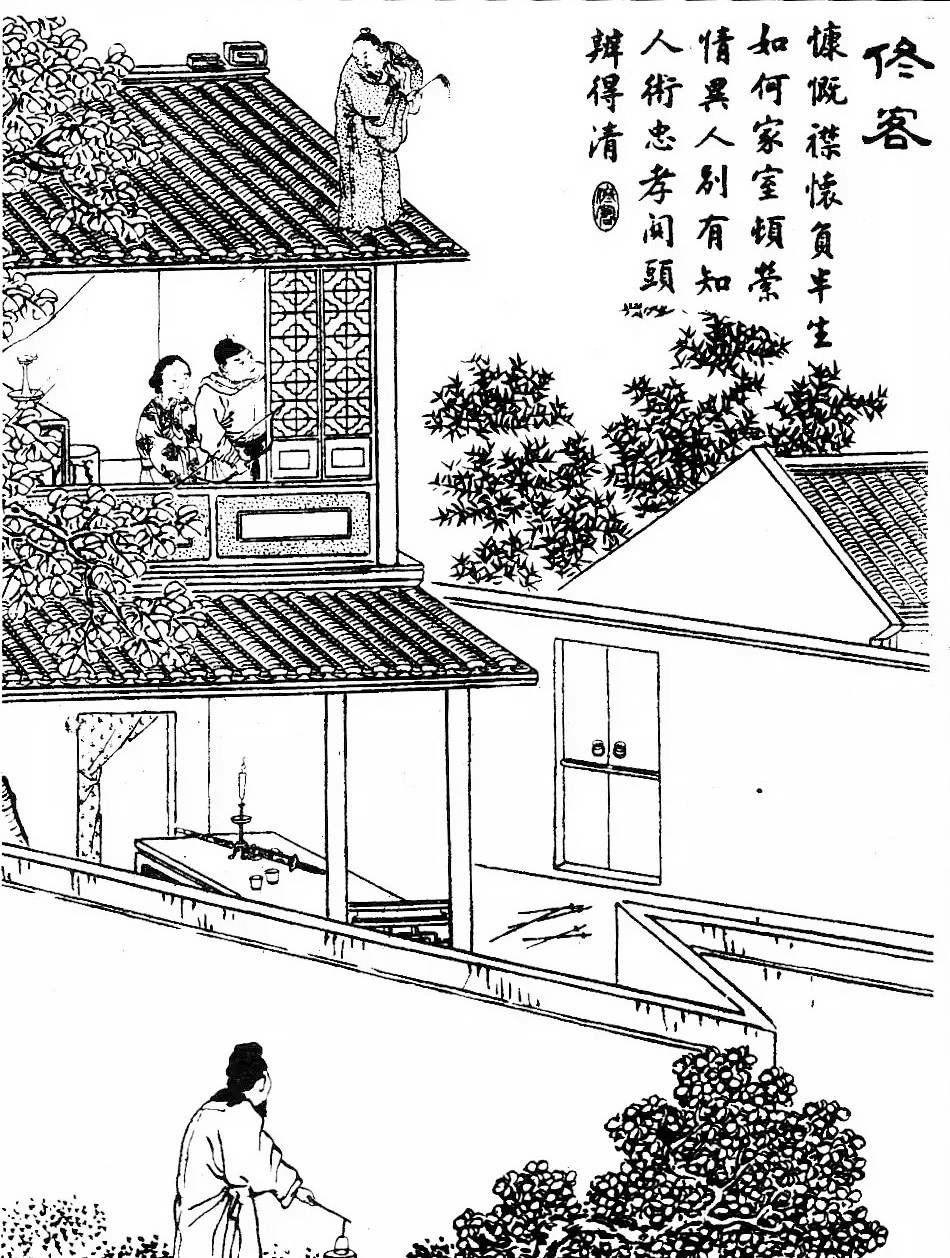
- 19th-century illustration from Xiangzhu liaozhai zhiyi tuyong (Liaozhai Zhiyi with commentary and illustrations; 1886)
- Original title: 佟客 (Tong ke)
- Translator: Sidney L. Sondergard (2012)
- Country: China
- Language: Chinese
- Genres: Zhiguai; Chuanqi; Short story

Publication
- Published in: Strange Tales from a Chinese Studio
- Media type: Print (Book)
- Publication date: 1740

Chronology
Fengxian (凤仙)	Ainu (爱奴)

"Traveller Tong" (Chinese: 佟客; pinyin: Tóng Kè) is a short story by Pu Songling first published in Strange Stories from a Chinese Studio (1740). It revolves around a scholar's encounter with the titular character, and was fully translated into English by Sidney L. Sondergard in 2012.

== Plot ==
A scholar from Xuzhou named Dong (董) meets a fellow traveller from Liaoyang, Tong (佟), while on the road. Tong informs Dong that he has been travelling around the world for two decades, and is currently en route home. Being a swordsmanship enthusiast and having long wanted to learn from a qualified swordsman, Dong asks if Tong has met any such person during his journeys. Tong tells him that finding such a mentor would be simpler than being accepted as his or her protege, for one would have to possess a pure character. Dong insists he has met such criteria and demonstrates some of his skills with his own sword.

Assessing Dong's sword as an inferior one, Tong draws out his own one – approximately one chi long – and uses it to slice of pieces of Dong's. Amazed, Dong invites Tong to his residence, while continuously exalting him. Later that evening, Dong hears his father crying for help in the building next door. He hurriedly grabs a halbert, intending to confront his father's assailant, but Tong stops him. He tells Dong that the attacker wants him to prove himself, and it would be prudent for Dong to bequeath his assets to his wife first, lest something happen to him during the soon-to-be confrontation. Dong agrees and informs his wife of the plan; however, he loses his bravado at hearing his wife cry. Dong ditches the plan to rescue his father and the couple prepare to defend themselves instead. Suddenly, they hear Tong's laughter, and the traveller informs them that the unknown assailant has vanished.

Dong walks out of the house to find that his father is unharmed, and had merely been socialising with a neighbour, whereas Tong has disappeared, leaving behind "piles of ash from grass torches". They conclude that he must have been a divine being.

Pu notes the importance of filial piety in his postscript, and narrates another tale concerning a bailiff who initially orders his adulterous wife to hang herself, only to rescind his command when her pleas for mercy become intolerable; thereafter, the couple make amends. Pu writes that the bailiff's story "is just as ridiculous as the story of Xie Jin". (Note: According to Pu, Xie Jin (解缙) was a Ming dynasty minister who, together with Fang Xiaoru (方孝孺), pledged to die for their Emperor. Fang made good on his word but Xie did not and returned home to find "his wife's sobs and tears unbearable".)

== Background ==
Loyalty and filial piety are the foundation of a man's heroic nature; since ancient times, men who proved unwilling to die for their fathers might originally have been brave enough to do so, but then changed their minds due to second thoughts. (Note: In Chinese: 忠孝，人之血性；古来臣子而不能死君父者，其初岂遂无提戈壮往时哉，要皆一转念误之耳。)

— Pu's postscript

Originally titled "Tong ke" (佟客), the story was first collected in Pu Songling's anthology of close to 500 "marvel tales", Liaozhai zhiyi or Strange Stories from a Chinese Studio, published in 1740. The story was included in the fifth volume of Sidney L. Sondergard's English translation of Liaozhai, published in 2012. Charles Hammond notes that "Traveller Tong" has an example of Pu's use of "metatextual comment" (i.e. appending an anecdote in the postscript) to reinforce the theme of the main narrative – in this case the loss of resolve – while extending upon his credibility as the narrator of Liaozhai.
