= Zhongli =

Zhongli may refer to:

== Locations ==
- Zhongli District (Chinese: 中壢區), Taoyuan, Taiwan
- Zhongli Township (Chinese: 中里乡), Gangbei District, Guigang, Guangxi, China
- Zhongli (state) (Chinese: 锺离国), ancient state in China

== People ==
- Zhongli Quan (Chinese: 鍾離權)
- Zhongli Mo (Chinese: 鍾離昩)

== Fiction ==
- "Growing Pears" (Chinese: 種梨), a short story from Pu Songling's Strange Tales from a Chinese Studio
- Zhongli (Genshin Impact), a character in 2020 video game Genshin Impact
