= The Witch's Trance-Dance =

- Short story by Pu Songling
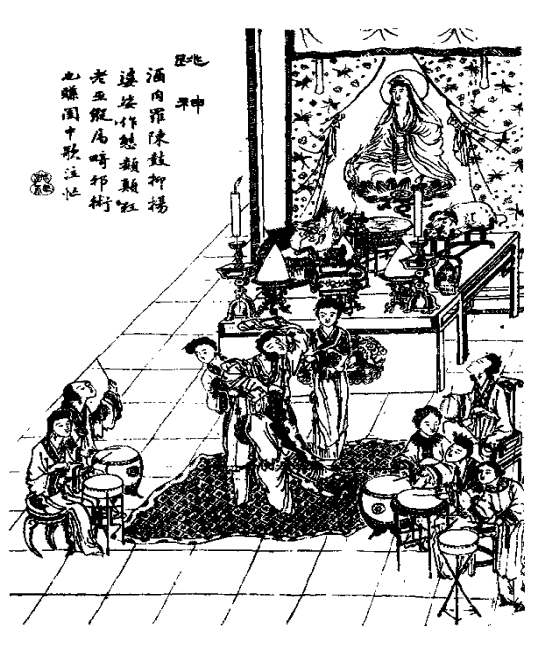
- 19th-century illustration from Xiangzhu liaozhai zhiyi tuyong (Liaozhai Zhiyi with commentary and illustrations; 1886)
- Original title: 跳神 (Tiàoshen)
- Translator: Sidney Sondergard (2008)
- Country: China
- Language: Chinese
- Genres: Zhiguai; Chuanqi; Short story

Publication
- Published in: Strange Tales from a Chinese Studio
- Media type: Print (Book)
- Publication date: 1740

Chronology
Zhangcheng (张诚)	Iron Skin Method (铁布衫法)

"The Witch's Trance-Dance" (Chinese: 跳神; pinyin: Tiàoshen; lit. 'Jumping God') is a short story by Pu Songling first published in Strange Tales from a Chinese Studio.

== Plot ==
In Jinan, and even more so in Beijing, elderly female shamans are often invited to sick beds to perform a ritual known as tiaoshen (跳神) intended to drive away the illness; they are also asked to bless the newly-weds. Pu Songling continues by going into great detail about these witches' methods.

== Literary significance ==
Sidney Sondergard writes that "there is certainly nothing sectarian about Pu Songling's depiction of the deities of Buddhism and Daoism, which is keeping with his eclectic enthusiasm for all things beyond the mundane"; in "The Witch's Trance-Dance", he "open-mindedly depicts practices associated with folk beliefs that aren't part of a pre-existing religious system". Ma Ruifang likewise notes the vivid description of northern Chinese witchcraft in the story, while arguing that Pu is satirising the fraudulent practices of the witches.
