= The Monster in the Buckwheat =

1740 short story by Pu Songling

- Short story by Pu Songling
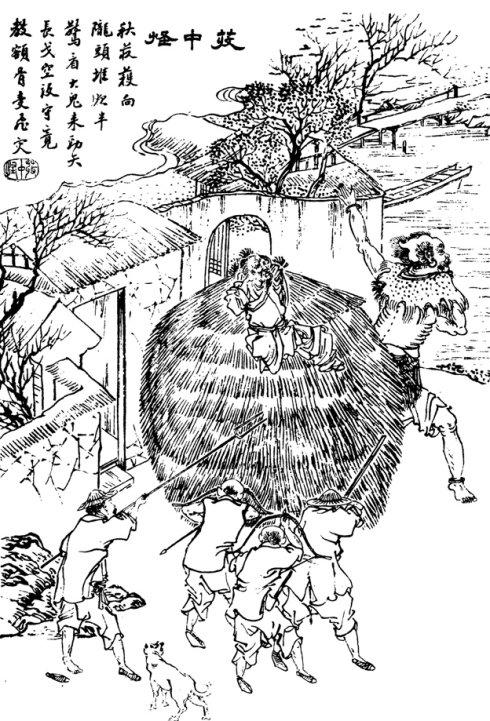
- 19th-century illustration from Xiangzhu liaozhai zhiyi tuyong (Liaozhai Zhiyi with commentary and illustrations; 1886)
- Original title: 荞中怪 (Qiao Zhong Guai)
- Country: China
- Language: Chinese
- Genres: Zhiguai; Short story

Publication
- Published in: Strange Tales from a Chinese Studio
- Publication date: 1740

Chronology
Catching Foxes (捉狐)	Household Monsters (宅妖)

"The Monster in the Buckwheat" (simplified Chinese: 荞中怪; traditional Chinese: 蕎中怪; pinyin: Qiáo zhōng guài) is a short story by Pu Songling, first published in Strange Tales from a Chinese Studio (1740). It concerns an elderly farmer's repeat encounters with a demon.

== Plot ==
A Changshan peasant by the name of An (安) encounters a gigantic red-haired demon while guarding over his newly-harvested buckwheat. The old man attacks the demon to scare it away, before running back to warn his fellow farmers, who are sceptical about his story. However, after encountering the demon for themselves the following day, the villagers arm themselves with bows and arrows; it returns later that day and they assemble to drive it away. Two or three days pass without incident and the villagers are gathering straw when the demon returns yet again. Without warning, it tackles An and bites off a palm-sized chunk of his forehead. The old man is rushed back home, where he dies, and the demon is never seen again, with its exact identity still a mystery.

== Publication history ==
Originally titled "Qiao Zhong Guai" (荞中怪), the story was first published in Pu Songling's 18th-century anthology Strange Tales from a Chinese Studio. Allan Barr writes that it was probably part of the opening volume of ghost stories (c. 1670s–1683) in the original eight-volume incarnation of Strange Tales; like the other early ghost stories as "Biting a Ghost" and "Wild Dog", "The Monster in the Buckwheat" has a "simple" three-part structure: "an opening passage that sets the scene, a central portion that relates the detail of the assault, and a concluding section that describes the examination of evidence in the aftermath."

The story was first translated into English as "The Monster in the Buckwheat" by John Minford and was included in his translation of Strange Tales published in 2006.
