= Stealing Peaches =

- Short story by Pu Songling
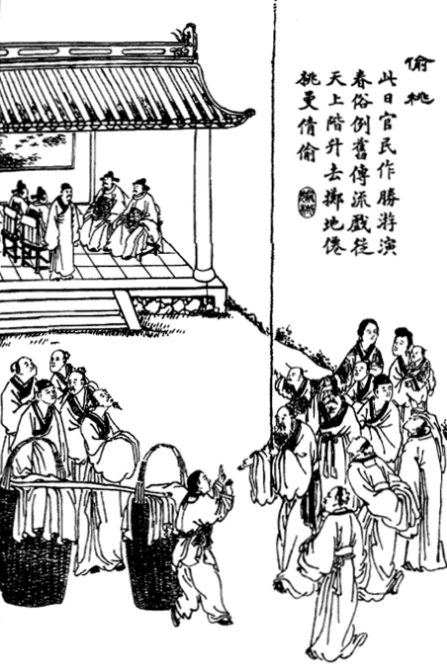
- 19th-century illustration from Xiangzhu liaozhai zhiyi tuyong (Liaozhai Zhiyi with commentary and illustrations; 1886)
- Original title: 偷桃 (Tou tao)
- Translator: Sidney L. Sondergard (2009)
- Country: China
- Language: Chinese
- Genres: Zhiguai; Chuanqi; Short story

Publication
- Published in: Strange Tales from a Chinese Studio
- Media type: Print (Book)
- Publication date: 1740

Chronology
Wang Liulang (王六郎)	Growing Pears (种梨)

"Stealing Peaches" (Chinese: 偷桃; pinyin: Tōu Táo), also variously translated as "The Peach Theft", "Theft of the Peach", "Stolen Peaches", and "Stealing a Peach", is a short story by Pu Songling, first published in Strange Stories from a Chinese Studio (1740). It is told in first person by Pu himself, and revolves around a magic trick similar to the Indian rope trick; Pu claims to have witnessed it personally as a child.

== Plot ==
While in Jinan, Shandong, a young Pu Songling and his friends are partaking in Chinese New Year festivities at the town hall. A wandering magician and his son come by, and one of the mandarins present in the crowd requests that the magician produce a peach in the dead of the winter. Initially perplexed, the magician finally takes up the official's challenge, telling the crowd that he has to visit the Queen Mother of the West's peach garden. He then retrieves a "coil of ropes that were about a hundred yards long" and hurls them skyward; the rope reaches the clouds, where it disappears from one's view, and is rigid. Citing his advanced age, the magician asks his son to help him steal the Queen Mother's peaches.

Apprehensive at first, the son is eventually cajoled into doing the deed. He climbs up the rope and vanishes from sight, and then a peach "the size of a large bowl" is thrown down from the skies. A pleased magician presents the gigantic peach to the mandarins, who are unable to determine whether it is real or fake. Suddenly, the rope goes limp and falls back to the ground. Shortly afterwards, his son's head follows suit. The conjurer proclaims that his son has been punished for stealing heavenly peaches, and the rest of his son's dismembered body comes hurtling down. The magician emotionally stores all of his son's body parts into a bamboo chest, and begs the officials for some money to defray funeral costs. After the shocked mandarins make the payment, the magician taps on the chest, and his son emerges, all in one piece. Pu notes that members of the White Lotus Sect were adept at such tricks and speculates that the father and son may have been members of the secret society.

== Publication history ==
The story was originally titled "Tou tao" (偷桃) and first appeared in Pu Songling's anthology of close to 500 supernatural stories, Strange Stories from a Chinese Studio or Liaozhai Zhiyi (1740). The first English translation of "The Peach Theft" was by British diplomat Clement Allen and first published in the 1874 volume of China Review. Subsequent translators of the story include Herbert Giles in Strange Stories from a Chinese Studio (1880) and Chinese Fairy Tales (1920), John Minford in Strange Tales from a Chinese Studio (2006), and Sidney L. Sondergard in Strange Tales from Liaozhai (2008).

== Literary significance and analysis ==
Charles Hammond cites "Stealing Peaches" as containing an example of Pu's use of "homodiegetic" narration (i.e. prefacing the story with a suggestion that he personally witnessed the magician's trick) to provide the main narrative with an "aura of factuality". The tale is significant for "(containing) a description of the (Indian) rope trick with nearly all of its vital features", supporting the claim that the trick was an "ancient accomplishment" and "the legend of the Indian Rope Trick is actually the legend of a Chinese Rope Trick". Pu wrote his account of the trick in Hangzhou; similarly, Ibn Battuta recounted witnessing such a trick while in Hangzhou in 1346.

== Adaptations ==
In 2001, China Post issued commemorative Liaozhai postage stamps in Shandong, the birthplace of Pu Songling. Amongst the collection is one depicting a scene in "Stealing Peaches"; others show scenes from entries such as "Yingning" and "The Painted Skin".
