= The Imperial Physician =

- Short story by Pu Songling
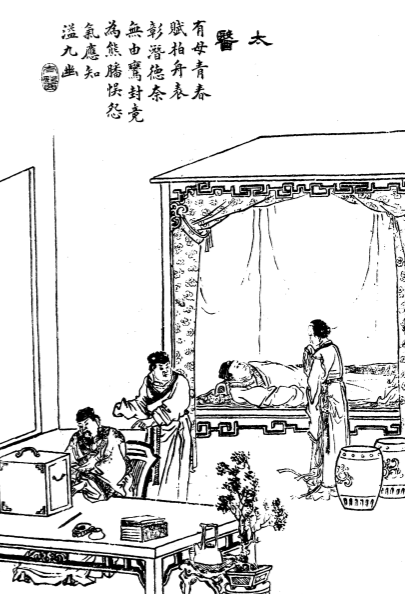
- 19th-century illustration from Xiangzhu liaozhai zhiyi tuyong (Liaozhai Zhiyi with commentary and illustrations; 1886)
- Original title: 太医 (Taiyi)
- Translator: Sidney L. Sondergard (2012)
- Country: China
- Language: Chinese
- Genre(s): Chuanqi; Short story

Publication
- Published in: Strange Tales from a Chinese Studio
- Media type: Print (Book)
- Publication date: 1740

Chronology
Zhang Hongjian (张鸿渐)	Wang Zian (王子安)

"The Imperial Physician" (Chinese: 太医; pinyin: Tàiyī) is a short story by the Chinese writer Pu Songling collected in Strange Tales from a Chinese Studio in 1740, and translated by Sidney L. Sondergard in 2012.

== Plot ==
Sun Pingshi (孙评事) has devoted all his effort to attaining an imperial degree, so as to honour his deceased mother who was windowed at the age of nineteen, during the Wanli Emperor's reign, and led a life of chastity hereafter. Finally, he earns the highest possible title of jinshi. However, he becomes very sick one day – just a few days short of formally becoming a civil servant. On the verge of death, he beckons for the imperial physician, but by the time of his arrival, Sun has already died, his eyes still open after realising that he would still have failed to honour his mother, in that he led a life without fame and prestige.

The imperial physician is briefed of the situation, and uses moxibustion to revive Sun. Before leaving, the doctor warns Sun not to consume any tiger or bear meat. Given the scarcity of such meats, though, Sun does not place much significance on the physician's warning. A week later, the crown prince is born and Sun attends the royal banquet held in celebration of the joyous occasion. He enjoys a spread of sumptuous food "sweet and refreshing beyond compare". The next day, he discovers that he had eaten bear's paw, and dies soon after.

== Themes and literary significance ==
A review of "The Imperial Physician" in a 1992 collection of International Papers on Liaozhai (国际聊斋论文集) remarks that Pu Songling, in reviving Sun Pingshi from the dead, only to have him die again, is characteristically highlighting the inevitability of fate, whilst placing the protagonist in a limbo. Further to the idea of inevitability is the fact that Sun unknowingly seals his own doom by consuming meat whose origins he is unaware of. The author notes that Pu frequently references the theme of "underdetermination" (Chinese: 虚虚实实, romanized: Fantasy and reality) as seen in other stories like "Wang Zian". Another key theme in "The Imperial Physician" is filial piety; his sole motivation for becoming a jinshi is to make his mother proud, and so great is his love for his mother that he is unable to die in peace without having done her proud.

== See also ==
- Chinese literature
- Chinese philosophy
