= Cai Weiweng =

- Short story by Pu Songling
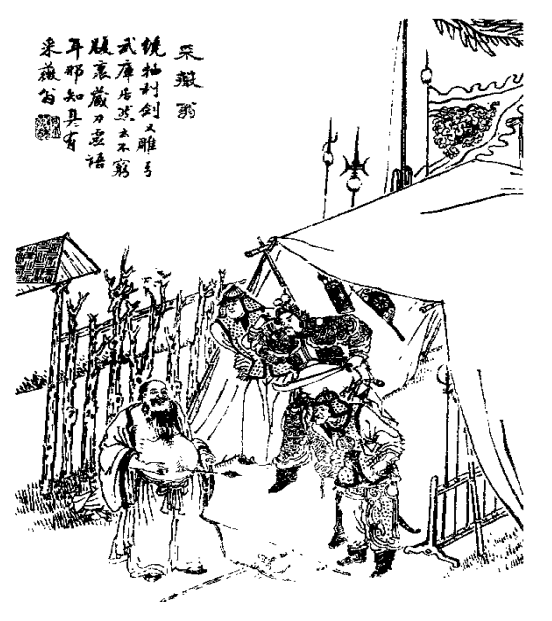
- Illustration from Xiangzhu liaozhai zhiyi tuyong (Liaozhai Zhiyi with commentary and illustrations; 1886)
- Original title: 采薇翁 (Cai Weiweng)
- Translator: Sidney L. Sondergard
- Country: China
- Language: Chinese
- Genres: Zhiguai; Chuanqi; Short story

Publication
- Published in: Strange Tales from a Chinese Studio
- Media type: Print (Book)
- Publication date: 1740
- Published in English: 2010

Chronology
Lotus Third Lady (荷花三娘子)	The Deer with the Grass in Their Mouths (鹿衔草)

"Cai Weiweng" (Chinese: 采薇翁; pinyin: Cǎi Wēiwēng) is a short story by Pu Songling first published in Strange Tales from a Chinese Studio. Set at the end of the Ming dynasty, the story follows the enigmatic title character who assists an army commander in training his troops.

== Plot ==
While preparing to cross the south end of the Yangtze, Yuling (於陵) native and army commander Liu Zhisheng (刘芝生) encounters a lightly-dressed man whose belly is exposed. The stranger introduces himself as Cai Weiweng (采薇翁) and offers to train Liu's troops. Cai also demonstrates his ability to slot an inordinate amount of weapons into his navel. By-and-by, mysterious deaths befall men whose actions are disagreeable to Cai; the troops tire of Cai's disciplinarian ways and petition for his removal. Liu approves of Cai's assassination; the soldiers attempt to behead him while he is asleep, but Cai's head immediately reattaches to his body. Next, they slice open his belly, only to be met with an onslaught of halberds and arrows. Upon being notified of this, Liu rushes into Cai's tent but he is nowhere to be found.

== Publication history ==
Originally titled "Cai Weiweng" (采薇翁), the story was first published in Pu Songling's anthology of close to five hundred short stories, Strange Tales from a Chinese Studio or Liaozhai Zhiyi. It was translated into English by Sidney L. Sondergard and included in the fourth volume of Strange Tales from Liaozhai published in 2010.

== Themes and analysis ==
Several commentators have argued that the story promotes anti-Qing sentiment. Zhu Jidun writes that the titular character symbolises the Southern Ming dynasty. Comparing it with other Strange Tales entries like "Household Monsters" and "General She", Wang Xiaojia remarks that Pu adopts a particularly wistful attitude towards the collapse of the Ming dynasty in "Cai Weiweng". The story also alludes to the gathering of over ten thousand rebels by Changshan Ming loyalist Liu Konghe (刘孔和) in support of the Hongguang Emperor.
