= Growing Pears =

1740 short story by Pu Songling

- Short story by Pu Songling
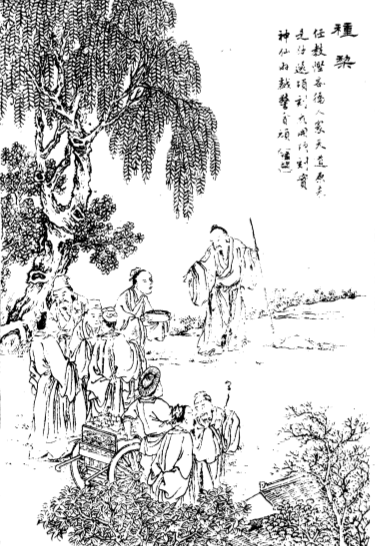
- 19th-century illustration from Xiangzhu liaozhai zhiyi tuyong (Liaozhai Zhiyi with commentary and illustrations; 1886)
- Original title: 種梨 (Zhongli)
- Translator: Herbert Giles (1880)
- Country: China
- Language: Chinese
- Genres: Zhiguai; Chuanqi; Short story

Publication
- Published in: Strange Tales from a Chinese Studio
- Media type: Print (Book)
- Publication date: 1740

Chronology
Stealing Peaches (偷桃)	The Beggar Immortal (丐仙)

"Growing Pears" (simplified Chinese: 种梨; traditional Chinese: 種梨; pinyin: Zhǒng Lí), also variously translated as "Planting a Pear Tree", "Sowing Pears", and "The Wonderful Pear Tree", is a short story by Pu Songling, first published in Strange Tales from a Chinese Studio. Set in ancient China, the story revolves around a miserly pear seller and a Taoist priest.

== Plot ==
In an unspecified Chinese village, a dishevelled Taoist priest unsuccessfully begs a pear seller for a single pear. However, an altruistic passer-by offers to buy the old man a pear, which he gladly accepts. The Taoist then offers to reciprocate by giving free pears to the crowd; he buries the pip of the pear in the ground and waters the soil with boiling water, shortly after which a mature pear tree sprouts. After handing out all of the tree's fruits to the passers-by, the Taoist cuts the tree down and heads off. The miserly pear seller, who had been caught up by the spectacle, only just realises that all his pears have gone missing – and his fruit cart has been sawn into pieces. Realising that the Taoist had employed sorcery against him, the fruit seller rushes to confront him, but he has disappeared without a trace. In his postscript, Pu Songling warns against being stingy, noting that "individuals (like the pear seller) are too numerous to list separately, so the example of such a foolish villager is anything but a surprise."

== Publication history ==
Originally titled "Zhongli" (種梨), the story was first published in Pu Songling's anthology of close to five hundred short stories, Strange Tales from a Chinese Studio or Liaozhai zhiyi. English translations of individual Liaozhai tales already existed prior to 1880; the earliest translation of "Zhongli" in particular is found in the 1842 textbook Easy Lessons in Chinese by American missionary Samuel W. Williams, who later reproduced "Planting the Pear Tree" in his 1848 ethnographic survey The Middle Kingdom.

However, Herbert A. Giles' Strange Stories from a Chinese Studio (1880), which contains translations of 164 Liaozhai entries, is considered the first substantial mainstream Liaozhai translation insofar as it was circulated more extensively than its predecessors. The story is titled "Planting a Pear-tree" in Giles' 1880 publication; Giles later retitled it "The Wonderful Pear Tree" in his 1911 anthology Chinese Fairy Tales which features eight Liaozhai stories including "The Painted Skin" and "Stealing Peaches". Subsequent translators have titled the story "Growing Pears" and "Sowing Pears". "Zhongli" was also one of the Liaozhai stories translated into French by Pierre Daudin in 1938 with the assistance of "two Chinese scholars and a Vietnamese collator"; it was collected in a 1940 Saigon publication titled Cinquante contes chinois extraits du Leao-tchai Tche-yi.

== Literary significance and reception ==
"Growing Pears" has been cited as an early description of the so-called mango trick – "one of the most venerable feats of Indian conjuring" – and like other Chinese texts of its time, it substitutes the mango with "indigenous flora", namely pears, while crediting Taoist magic. For instance, the Eastern Jin historian Gan Bao writes about a sage named Xu Guang who dupes a melon seller in Anecdotes about Spirits and Immortals.

The story is also significant for its "too many parallels" with the opening segment of the Indian rope trick popularly described in the Chicago Tribune in 1890. Whereas Tribune writer John Wilkie writes of an Indian juggler who "grew a two-feet tall mango tree from a seed within a few minutes", Pu's Taoist monk is able to accomplish a similar feat with a pear seed instead. Shengyu Wang suggests that, prior to writing his hoax article, Wilkie had read Giles' translation of "Planting a Pear Tree" as well as "Stealing Peaches".

== Adaptations ==
Pu's story was adapted for the third volume of fairy tale anthology The Bookshelf for Boys and Girls first published in New York City in 1909; at a September 2003 symposium in Shandong dedicated to discussing the literary rights of Pu Songling, local author Qiu Xun noted that the contributor for The Bookshelf (who went by the alias "Frances Carpenter") failed to properly credit Pu and also committed a number of translation errors. The children's book The Beggars Magic (1997), co-authored by Margaret Scrogin Chang and David Chang and illustrated by David Johnson, is predominantly based on "Growing Pears"; set in a Chinese village, it follows Fu Nan and his friends as they witness the miraculous feats of a "mysterious elderly stranger".
