= Lodovico Nicola di Giura =

- Born: 1868; Chiaromonte
- Died: 1947 (aged 78–79)
- Known for: Italian translation of the Liaozhai zhiyi
- Medical career
- Profession: Surgeon

Lodovico Nicola di Giura, (also spelt Ludovico Nicola di Giura) (1868-1947), was an Italian surgeon, sinologist, translator, writer and traveller. He was from Chiaromonte. He was posted as medical officer of the Italian Navy at the Italian embassy in Beijing during the Boxer Rebellion, he then worked in Tianjin. By 1913 he was working as a civilian doctor.

Giura produced the first complete translation into Italian of the Liaozhai zhiyi entitled I racconti fantastici di Liao, called in English The Strange Tales from a Chinese Studio. He also translated Li Bai's poetry into Italian and wrote an autobiographical novel.

Giura remained in China from 1900 to 1930. He later became the Prefect and Mayor of Chiaromonte from 1931 to 1947.

The Anthropological Archaeological Museum Il Museo Archeologico Antropologico “Lodovico Nicola di Giura” is named for him.
