= Yu Ji (painter) =

Chinese painter, calligrapher, and poet

- Born: 1739
- Died: 1823 (aged 83–84)
- Known for: Painting

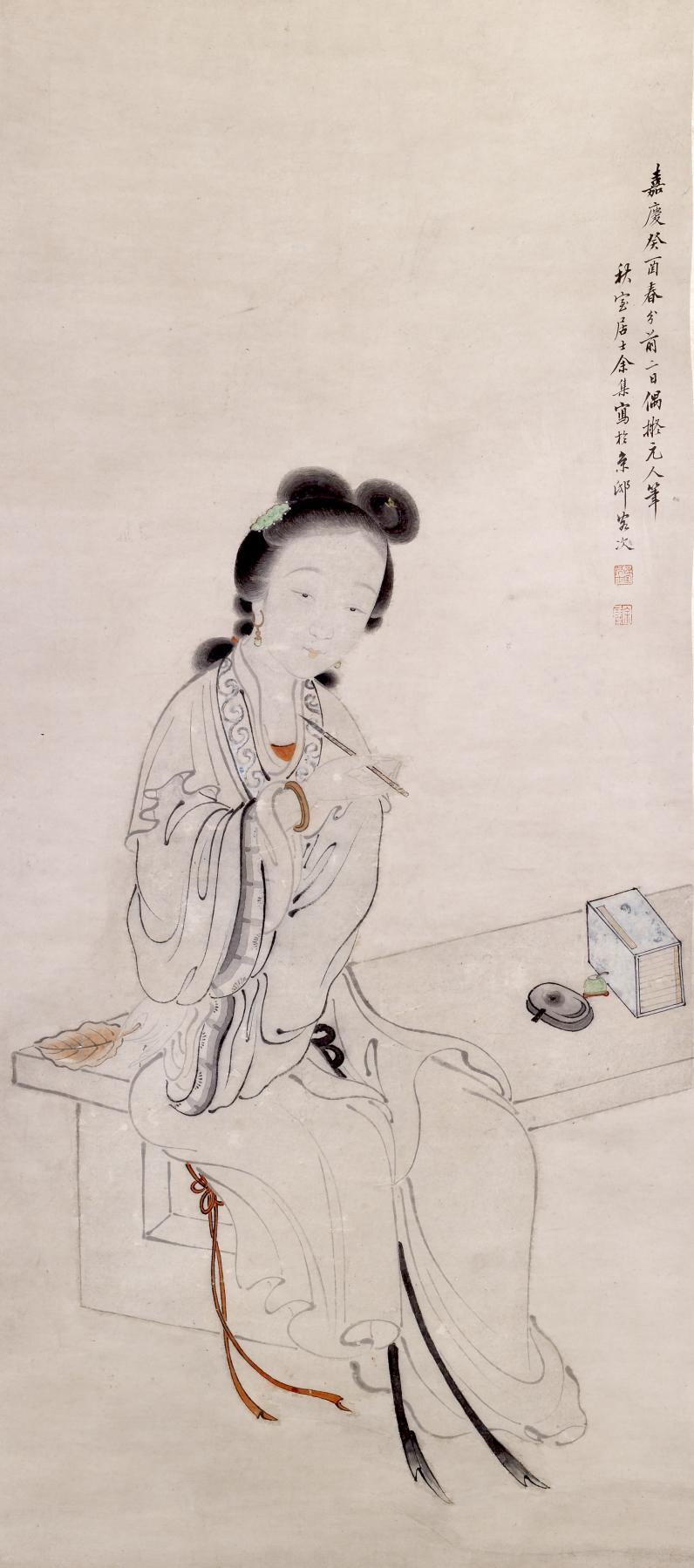
Lady on a Bench by Yu Ji

Yu Ji (Chinese: 余集; pinyin: Yú Jí; 29 Jan 1739–1823) was a Chinese painter, calligrapher, and poet active during the Qing dynasty. A Hangzhou native and a member of the Hanlin Academy, he was known for painting female figures, which earned him the nickname Yu meiren or "Yu, the Painter of Beauties" (余美人). Yu was also an editor; he contributed to the Siku Quanshu and was the collator of the first printed edition of Liaozhai zhiyi or Strange Tales from a Chinese Studio published in 1766.
