= Three Lives =

Three Lives may refer to:

- Three Lives (book), a 1909 book by Gertrude Stein
- "Three Lives" (short story), a short story by Pu Songling
- Three Lives (film), a 1924 Georgian silent film
- Three Lives, a 1971 American documentary film directed by Kate Millett
- Three Lives & Company, a bookstore in Manhattan
