= Zhang Hongjian =

- Short story by Pu Songling
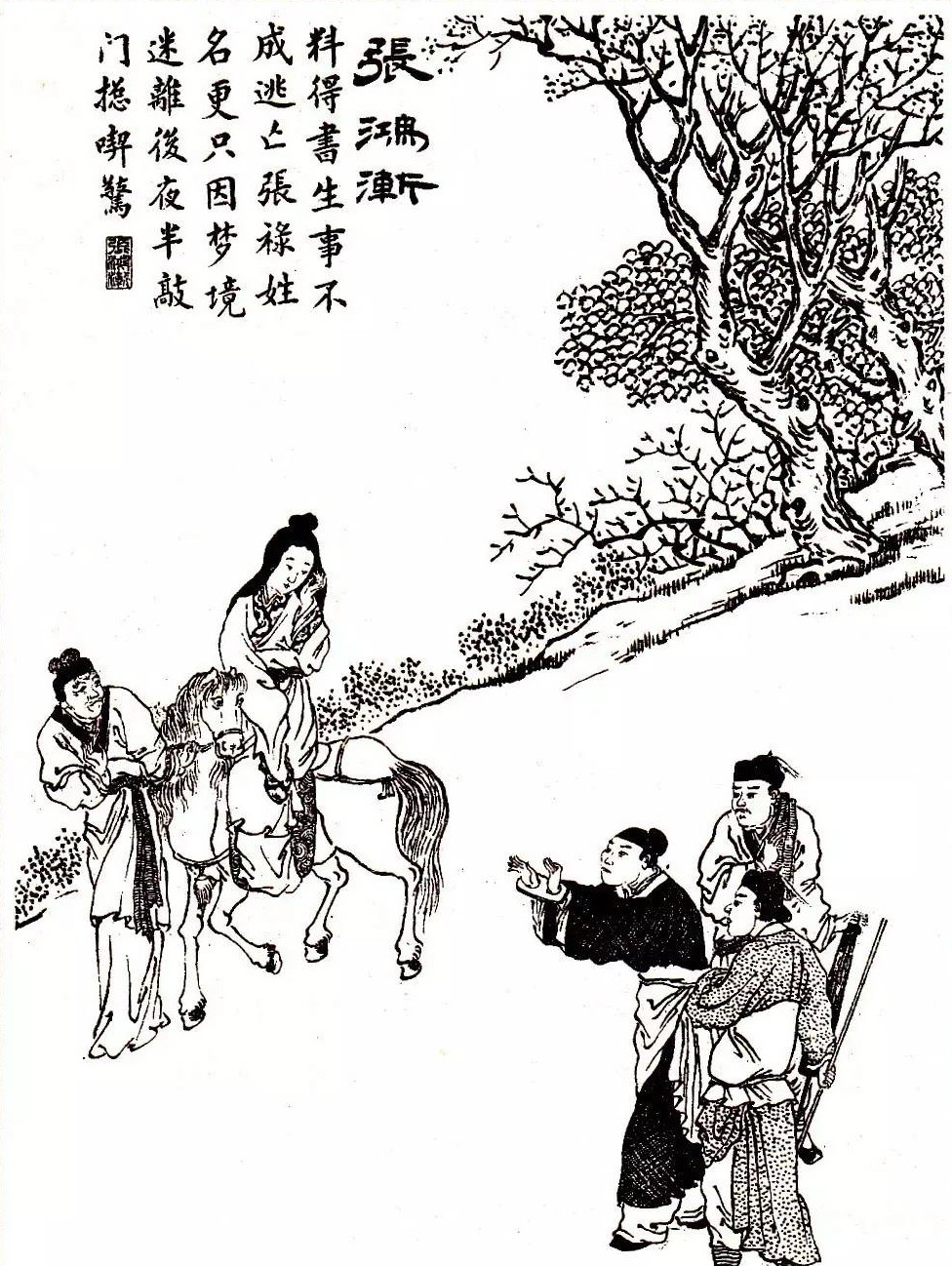
- Zhang Hongjian encounters Shi and Shunhua while being escorted to the capital, in a 19th-century illustration from Xiangzhu liaozhai zhiyi tuyong (Liaozhai Zhiyi with commentary and illustrations; 1886)
- Original title: 張鴻漸 (Zhang Hongjian)
- Translator: Sidney L. Sondergard (2012)
- Country: China
- Language: Chinese
- Genre(s): Chuanqi; Short story

Publication
- Published in: Strange Tales from a Chinese Studio
- Media type: Print (Book)
- Publication date: 1740

Chronology
Turning Soil into Rabbits (土化兔)	The Imperial Physician (太医)

"Zhang Hongjian" (traditional Chinese: 張鴻漸; simplified Chinese: 张鸿渐; pinyin: Zhāng Hóngjiàn) is a short story by the Chinese writer Pu Songling collected in Strange Tales from a Chinese Studio in 1740, and translated by Sidney L. Sondergard in 2012. Set in various parts of 18th-century China, the story revolves around the title character and his misadventures while on the run. Pu adapted the story into two of his plays.

== Plot ==
Outraged by the atrocities of a corrupt Lulong County magistrate Zhao, a group of scholars turn to fellow scholar Zhang Hongjian (张鸿渐), a resident of Yongping, to help them draft the necessary legal documents. Zhang initially agrees, but is dissuaded from participating any further by his spouse Fang, who warns that Zhang would be implicated should things go awry. Meanwhile, Zhao bribes his way into immunity, and the other scholars are arrested before they can make their case heard. Zhang skips town and after some time he arrives at Fengxiang County, Shaanxi, and seeks refuge at a cottage maintained by an elderly housekeeper named Shi; she informs Zhang that the original owners of the residence are dead, and their three daughters remain. While initially upset at Shi for inviting a fugitive into their home, the eldest daughter Shunhua (舜华), upon learning of his scholarly background, proposes to Zhang that they get married. Zhang discloses his marital status, but eventually agrees to Shunhua's proposal.

Half a year passes, with all of Zhang's expenses being covered by Shunhua. One day, Zhang returns home earlier than usual, only to find the building missing. He discovers that Shunhua is a fox spirit, but remains in love with her. Now aware of her supernatural abilities, Zhang requests for Shunhua to send him back to his hometown of Yongping, so that he can reunite with Fang and his children. Shunhua complies and Zhang returns home to find that his son has aged by several years, and the scholars involved in the Zhao case have since died or moved out of Lulong. Fang chastises Zhang for deserting the family for so long; he reaffirms his love for her, and downplays the significance of his romantic relationship with Shunhua. Suddenly, Fang becomes Shunhua and Zhang realises that all along he had been under the influence of Shunhua's sorcery. Disappointed in him, Shunhua sends Zhang home for good and the two part ways.

Since Zhang left Yongping, a hooligan named Jia has been harassing Fang. Jia witnesses Zhang's reunion with Fang and, not knowing anything about him, assumes that they are lovers. Jia confronts Fang and threatens to divulge her 'secret romance'. Enraged, Zhang leaps out at Jia and kills him with a sword. Fraught with guilt, Zhang tells Fang to take good care of their son, before turning himself in to the officials. Zhang has to stand trial at the imperial court, thus he is escorted by a pair of guards to the capital. Along the way, they encounter Shi and Shunhua. Upon learning of Zhang's predicament, the old woman invites them into an inn and treats the guards to liquor. With the guards intoxicated, Shunhua uncuffs Zhang and they hurriedly flee by horse. After a distance, Shunhua bids Zhang farewell.

Zhang travels to Taiyuan, where he makes a living giving tuition under the alias of Gong Ziqian (宫子迁). A decade later, he learns that all efforts to recapture him have been terminated, so he decides to head back home. An emotional Fang tells him that his son has since become a successful scholar and gotten married, and has left to take his civil service examinations. That night, a stranger knocks on their door; for fear of being found out, Zhang secretly escapes, after which the stranger introduces himself to Fang as a messenger bearing the good news that Zhang's son performed outstandingly at the examinations.

Meanwhile, Zhang flees to a faraway village and seeks shelter at an elderly man Xu's hut. Xu is a retired government official, and his elder son has taken over his role. He invites Zhang to stay and tutor his younger son. Xu's elder son returns home a month later, together with an eighteen-year-old successful examination candidate surnamed Zhang. Zhang suspects the youth to be his son and corroborates his hunch with the list of successful examination candidates Xu has. Indeed, he identifies his son's name and the two happily reunite. They return home to Fang's surprise and joy, and Zhang makes amends with Jia's father.

== Publication history ==
The story first appeared in Pu Songling's anthology of supernatural tales, Strange Tales from a Chinese Studio (Liaozhai) in 1740. It was included in the fifth volume of Sidney L. Sondergard's English translation of Liaozhai, published in 2012. "Zhang Hongjian" significantly contains one of the earliest references to ghost-writers, proving that ghost-writing was already practised during or even before Pu's time.

== Adaptations ==
Pu Songling was also a playwright, and he adapted "Zhang Hongjian" into two vernacular plays: Immortals with Riches and Honour (富贵神仙) (Note: Also translated as Riches and Glory: Divine Immortals.) and Song of Tribulation (磨难曲), although the latter focuses predominantly on Zhang's life alone, "set in the context of rural immiseration in the north, and focusing on Zhang's bureaucratic career and military exploits." The Hong Kong black-and-white film The Fairy, starring Wu Chufan (吴楚帆) as Zhang Hongjian and Zi Luolian (紫罗莲) as Shunhua, and directed by Li Zhenfeng, premiered on 19 February 1962.
