= Mr. Miao =

- Short story by Pu Songling
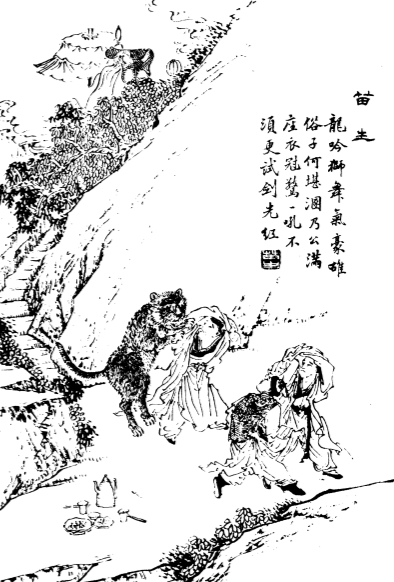
- 19th-century illustration from Xiangzhu liaozhai zhiyi tuyong (Liaozhai Zhiyi with commentary and illustrations; 1886)
- Original title: 苗生 (Miaosheng)
- Translator: Herbert Giles (1880)
- Country: China
- Language: Chinese
- Genres: Zhiguai; Chuanqi; Short story

Publication
- Published in: Strange Tales from a Chinese Studio
- Media type: Print (Book)
- Publication date: 1740

Chronology
Divining with the Immortals (乩仙)	Du Xiaolei (杜小雷)

"Mr. Miao" (Chinese: 苗生; pinyin: Miáo shēng), also translated as "The Tiger Guest" and "Student Miao", is a short story by Pu Songling first published in Strange Tales from a Chinese Studio (1740). It revolves around a few Chinese scholars and their encounter with a tiger spirit named Miao.

== Plot ==
En route to Xi'an for an examination, Minzhou (岷州) scholar Gong (龚) stops for a drink at an inn, where he is approached by a burly but well-mannered stranger who introduces himself as "Miao" (苗). Gong buys him a drink, but this does not satisfy Miao; Miao heads to the marketplace and returns with a considerably large jar of wine. Gong is coerced into drinking a few more cups of liquor, whereas Miao drinks from a bowl. Miao admits to Gong that he is not adept at entertaining guests, and tells him that he may leave if he pleases. Shortly after bidding Miao farewell, however, Gong's horse collapses; Miao, who happens to be in the vicinity, comes to Gong's aid, and single-handedly carries the horse to a nearby lodge. Amazed and thankful, Gong invites Miao to another round of drinks.

Following their examinations, Gong and a group of friends are picnicking at Flowery Hill (华山), only to be joined by Mr. Miao, who is warmly received by Gong's friends. Amidst the food and wine, a game of "capping verses" (completing the couplet) is proposed; Miao suggests that the stakes be death, but this is taken to be a joke by Gong and his friends. The game proceeds, but the quality of verses recited by Gong's friends is deemed so egregious by Miao that he agitatedly roars and jumps about. Simultaneously, Gong's friends have begun to act rowdily under the influence of alcohol. After a failed attempt to quieten them, an incensed Miao transforms into a tiger and kills all of the men present, save Gong and a fellow scholar Mr. Jin (靳).

Three years after the harrowing experience, Mr. Jin, having recently obtained his master's degree, returns to Flowery Hill. To his shock and horror, he is stopped by Ji (釉), one of Gong's friends and Miao's victims. Ji reveals that he has been condemned to enslavement under Miao for eternity, unless he can find another soul to replace his. Ji pleads with Jin to help him find a scholar for Miao to eat in three days' time. Miao has laid out the conditions that the victim must be at the Dark Dragon Ridge (苍龙岭) dressed in scholar attire. Jin has no actual intention of helping Ji but recounts the tale to a friend, Jiang (蒋). Jiang, who has a vendetta against another scholar named Yu (尤), plots to make Yu the next victim of Miao's because Yu had performed as well as he did during the examination.

Despite the strange caveat that only Yu is to come dressed, Yu accepts Jiang's invitation to a reception at Flowery Hill. However, a government official and family friend of Jiang's coincidentally is at the hill too, and upon learning of Jiang's presence, calls upon him. Embarrassed to greet him in a state of déshabillé, Jiang borrows Yu's clothes and is promptly devoured by Miao in tiger form.

== Literary significance ==
Allan Barr observes that "Pu Songling was keenly conscious that vivid effects could be achieved by the use of dialogue" and "he frequently relied on colloquial speech to lend immediacy to a scene" as is evidenced by Mr. Miao's rebuke of Gong's friends at the picnic.

In his essay "How to Make a Story Beautiful: On Aesthetic Dialectics of Liao zhai zhi yi", Li Hong-xiang lists Mr. Miao as an example of how "(i)n order to highlight the aesthetic effect, Pu Songling tended to describe the sudden changes of beautiful things in his story." Mr. Miao's metamorphosis into a tiger is a reflection of his apathy towards Gong and friends' "boring talking and mutual admiration".

Argentine writer Jorge Luis Borges especially enjoyed Mr. Miao, amongst fifteen other Liaozhai entries, and wrote a prologue for it to appear in his Library of Babel (1979), a collection of writings on his favourite stories.

== Bibliography ==
- Barr, Alan (2007). ""Liaozhai zhiyi" and "Shiji"". Asia Major. 20 (1): 133–153. JSTOR 41649930.
- Li, Hong-xiang (June 2016). "How to Make a Story Beautiful: On Aesthetic Dialectics of Liao zhai zhi yi". Journal of Literature and Art Studies. 6 (6): 695–707. doi:10.17265/2159-5836/2016.06.011. S2CID 54591246.
