= Théâtre Golovine =

Coordinates: 43.9504°N 4.8093°E

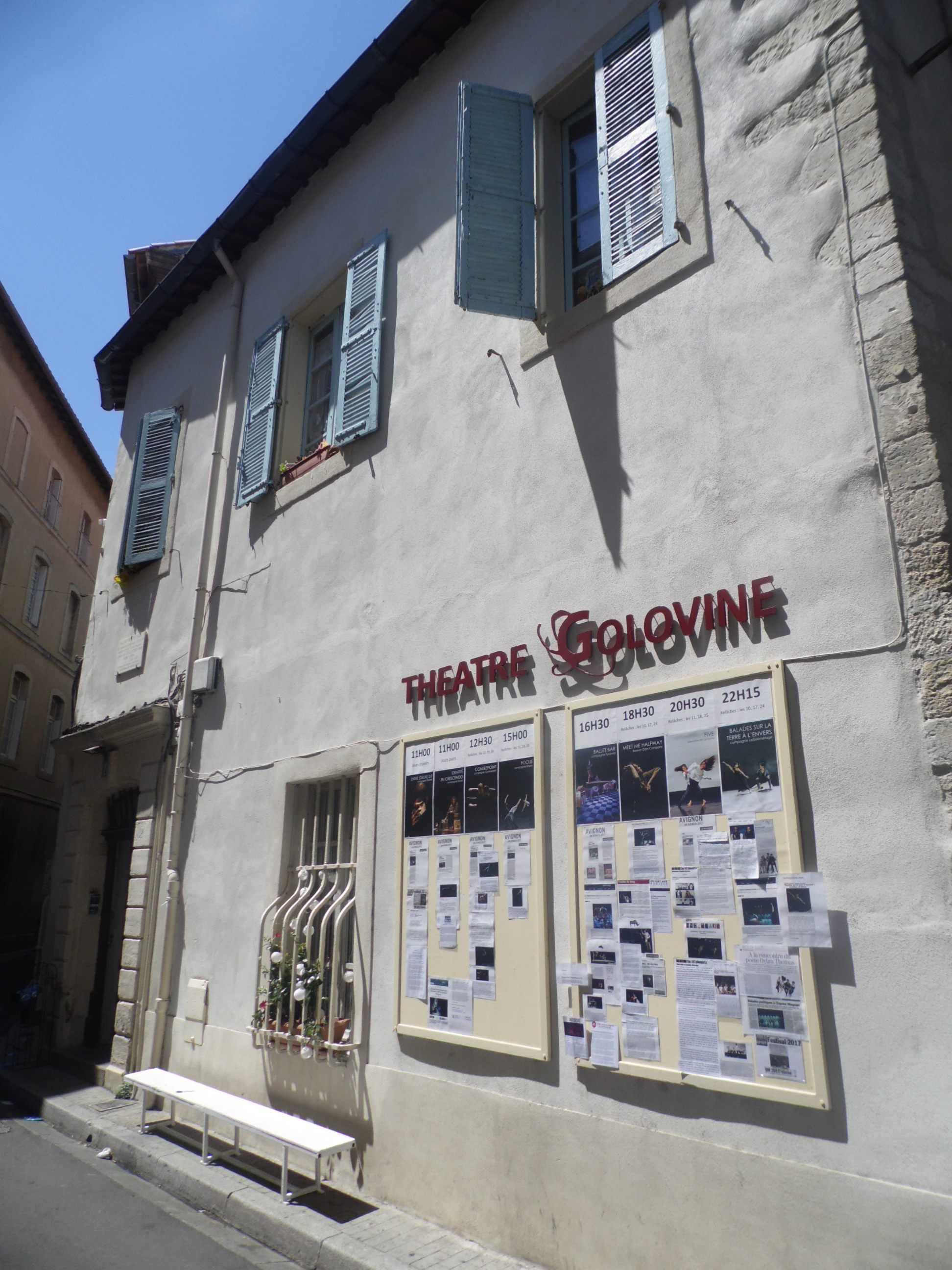
The theatre photographed in 2017.

The Théâtre Golovine is a dance theatre in Avignon established in 1975.
