= Liu Chen and Ruan Zhao =

Han Chinese semi-legendary figures

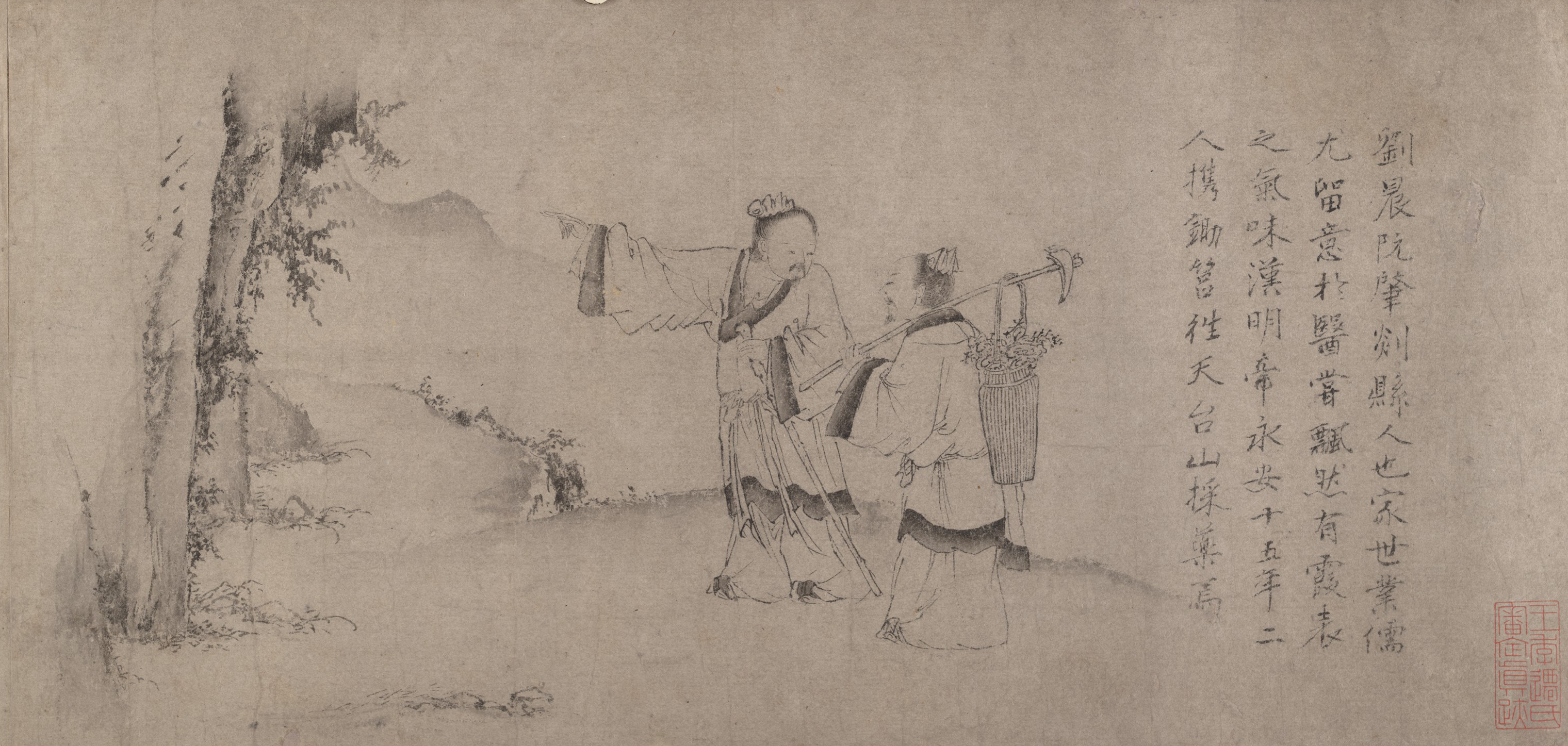
Liu Chen and Ruan Zhao Entering the Tiantai Mountains by Zhao Cangyun.

Liu Chen (劉晨) and Ruan Zhao (阮肇) were semi-legendary figures active during the Han dynasty, known for their trip to Tiantai Mountain. First described in the early fifth-century zhiguai anthology Youming lu (幽明錄), the legend of Liu Chen and Ruan Zhao has been depicted in paintings, plays, and poetry.

== Synopsis ==
The legend of Liu Chen and Ruan Zhao was first described in the zhiguai anthology Youming lu (幽明錄), whose authorship is attributed to Liu Yiqing (403–444). It is recollected in the Taiping Yulan. In the fifth year of the Yongping Emperor, Shengzhou natives Liu Chen (劉晨) and Ruan Zhao (阮肇) head to Tiantai Mountain to procure medicinal herbs, whereupon they encounter a couple of beautiful maidens in a valley of peach blossoms. They cohabit with them but begin to feel homesick after half a year. However, Liu and Ruan return home discover that hundreds of years have elapsed after meeting their seventh-generation grandchildren. In the eighth year of the Taiyuan reign of the Jin dynasty, Liu and Ruan disappear again, this time apparently forever.

== Depictions ==
Painted on a Cizhou ware pillow, dating back to the Jin dynasty and currently housed at the Palace Museum in Beijing, are "two gentlemen crossing a bridge and walking towards a cloudy ravine"; according to scholar Li Qingquan, the two men are Liu and Ruan. The Yuan dynasty playwright Wang Ziyi (王子一) adapted the story into a play titled Liu Chen Ruan Zhao wu ru taoyuan or Liu Chen and Ruan Zhao Strayed into the Land of Peach Blossoms (劉晨阮肇誤入桃源). Yuan painter Zhao Cangyun's "most famous painting" is on the handscroll Liu Chen and Ruan Zhao Entering the Tiantai Mountains (劉晨阮肇入天台山圖), which has been on display at the Metropolitan Museum of Art since September 1999; the handscroll also features inscriptions by Zhao and is accompanied by colophons by Zhao Heqin (趙鶴琴), Hua Youwu (華幼武), Yao Guangxiao (姚廣孝), and Song Yong (宋邕).

== Allusions ==
The previously unpublished autobiographical account of Zhang Daye's (1854–?) life during and after the Taiping Rebellion—whose manuscript was rediscovered and translated into English by Xiaofei Tian as The World of a Tiny Insect in 2013—begins thus:

In the nineteenth year—the guisi year—of the Guangxu era, beginning when the Emperor took the dragon throne, on the sixth day of the fourth month, this tiny insect took a trip to Tiantai.

Tian writes that Zhang's "deliberate discursive choice" of evoking the legend of Liu Chen and Ruan Zhao with the phrase "trip to Tiantai" serves to create an "ironic reversal of the idyllic, if legendary, past"; moreover, while Zhang did pass by the mountain, his final destination was his friend Yuan Jichuan's residence in Shaoxing.
