= Three Incarnations =

- Short story by Pu Songling
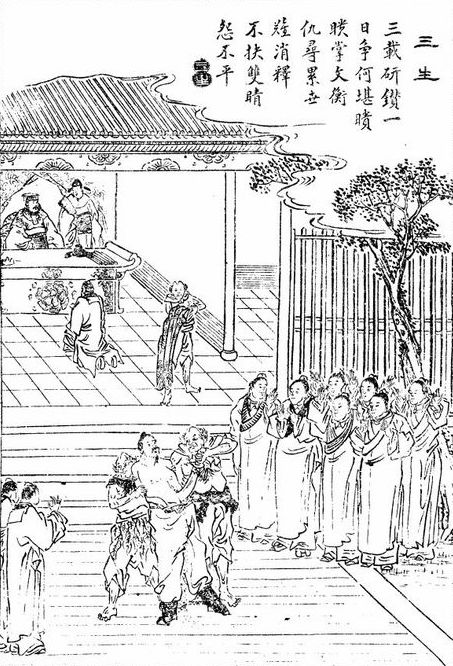
- 19th-century illustration from Xiangzhu liaozhai zhiyi tuyong (Liaozhai with commentary and illustrations; 1886)
- Original title: 三生 (Sansheng)
- Translator: Sidney L. Sondergard
- Country: China
- Language: Chinese
- Genres: Zhiguai; Chuanqi; Short story

Publication
- Published in: Strange Stories from a Chinese Studio
- Publication type: Anthology
- Publication date: c. 1740
- Published in English: 2008

Chronology
(湘裙)	(长亭)

"Three Incarnations" (Chinese: 三生; pinyin: Sānshēng), also translated as "Three Lives", (Note: An earlier entry in Strange Tales from a Chinese Studio is also titled "Three Lives".) is a short story by Pu Songling first published in Strange Tales from a Chinese Studio which revolves around two men who, during the course of three lifetimes, are in constant conflict with one another.

== Plot ==
An unnamed fellow from Hunan is able to remember details from three of his past lives. Once upon a time he was an academic examiner against whom a complaint is lodged from hell by a scholar named Xing Yutang (兴于唐) who "became so angry that he died" after failing the examination. Amidst cries from thousands of scholars – all of whom died similar deaths – for justice to be served, Yama orders that both the academic examiner and his supervisor, the chief examiner, are to be eviscerated.

The academic examiner is reborn as a peasant in Shaanxi, whereas Xing becomes an army commander who executes the peasant during a local rebellion. Back in hell, Yama condemns both the peasant and the commander to be reborn as dogs, for their respective impiety and disregard for life; the two dogs meet in a dogfight and kill each other. The Hell King remarks that the two should just "let it go", before decreeing that the former examiner should now be Xing's father-in-law.

The examiner is reborn in Changyun County, Shandong as a successful scholar whose wife gives birth to a remarkable daughter; however, he refuses to marry her off and stonewalls her suitors. Sometime later, he encounters a bachelor named Li – the current incarnation of Xing Yutang – and proceeds to arrange for his daughter to wed Li. Though subject to much abuse from his son-in-law, the former examiner continues to treat him kindly. Soon enough he is able to offer Li counsel after the latter is frustrated at his poor performance in the examination hall. The duo are thus reconciled and become "as close as father and son".

In his postscript, Pu Songling remarks that the enmity between Xing and the examiner was so great that it took more than three lifetimes to be resolved, while musing, "Are all the beloved sons-in-law in the law former aggrieved spirits from the underworld?"

== Background ==
Originally titled "Sansheng" (三生), "Three Incarnations" was fully translated into English in the fifth volume of Sidney L. Sondergard's Strange Tales from a Chinese Studio published in 2008. Glen Dudbridge posits that Pu may have been inspired by certain stories in Feng Menglong's Stories to Caution the World in his writing of Strange Tales from a Chinese Studio, elaborating that "Three Incarnations" "immediately invites comparison" with a Stories entry titled "An old protége thrice rewards his benefactor" (老门生三世报恩). The former is described as a subversion of the latter, retaining the device of repetition while allowing "scope for novelty and variation".

The central theme of the black comedy is reincarnation, which reflects the "pervasive cultural belief in the soul's survival". Dudbridge further offers that a significant portion of the story is also devoted to exploring the "vagaries of the imperial examination system" which offers a "delightful irony" insofar as they allow for the interpersonal conflict to be resolved.

== Adaptations ==
A scene from the play Hushuo (2003), which was staged at the Shenzhen University, is inspired by "Three Incarnations", with a reviewer for the MIT Press commenting that the cast "underwent reversals with a difference ... (staggering home) like the wandering soul of 'Three Lives' to not quite where they began, which is not necessarily where they intended to go."
