= Judge Lu =

Short story by Pu Songling

- Short story by Pu Songling
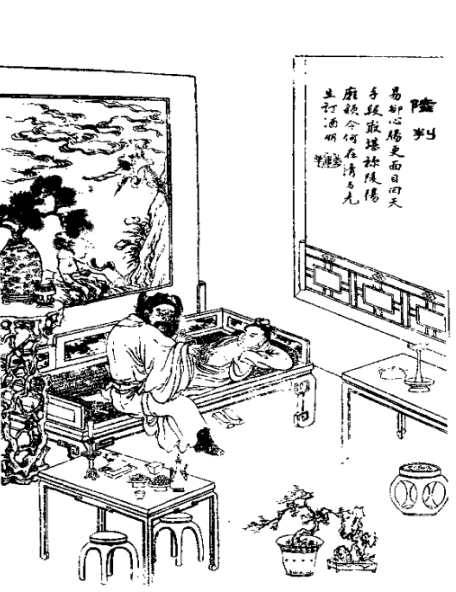
- Illustration from Xiangzhu liaozhai zhiyi tuyong (Liaozhai Zhiyi with commentary and illustrations; 1886)
- Original title: 陸判 (Lu Pan)
- Translator: Herbert Giles (1880)
- Country: China
- Language: Chinese
- Genre(s): Short story

Publication
- Published in: Strange Tales from a Chinese Studio
- Media type: Print (Book)
- Publication date: 1766

Chronology
The Temple Demon (齕石)	Yingning (嬰寧)

"Judge Lu" (simplified Chinese: 陆判; traditional Chinese: 陸判; pinyin: Lù Pàn) is a short story written by Pu Songling (1640–1715) and first published in 1766 in Strange Tales from a Chinese Studio. It revolves around a scholar and his friendship with a judge from the underworld, who performs a heart transplant on him and a head transplant on his wife. The story was translated into English by Herbert Giles in 1880.

== Plot ==
At a drinking party, Lingyang (陵陽) (Note: A place in Anhui.) scholar Zhu Erdan (朱爾丹), courtesy name Xiaoming (小明), is jokingly asked by his literati friends to remove an idol from the local "Chamber of Horrors", (Note: A recreation of the ten levels of purgatory in Chinese mythology; various punishments take place at each level, whose overseer is represented by an idol made of clay or wood.) on account of Zhu's supposed bravery. However, much to everyone else's horror, he readily takes on the challenge and returns with the life-size idol of a green-faced and red-bearded underworld judge. (Note: Specifically a panguan (判官) whose roles are "record management and decision making".) Zhu offers the idol a toast and invites the judge to his house, before returning the idol to its temple.

The next day, Zhu's friends host another drinking party in honour of his daring feat. Upon returning home, Zhu is greeted by the very judge whose idol he had taken the previous day. Against his wife's entreaties, Zhu rushes to serve his guest, who reveals that his surname is Lu (陸). Zhu and Lu become close friends, so much so that they "sometimes slept together with the soles of their feet touching." However, the judge constantly criticises Zhu's essays for being "good for nothing". One night, Zhu awakes to find Lu opening up his body. Lu explains that Zhu's poor writing is due to a heart defect, thus his heart needs replacing. Before long, the operation is over and Zhu realises that his writing abilities have vastly improved. A few days later, Lu returns to review Zhu's latest essays; he advises him that he will be a successful but not outstanding scholar.

After Zhu reveals to them the secret behind his progress, his friends urge him to introduce Lu to them, so that they may also excel in their examinations. However, when Lu does arrive, they flee in fright. Zhu then requests that the judge perform a cosmetic operation on his wife's face, to which Lu agrees. A few days later, Zhu's wife awakes to find that her facial features have completely changed; Zhu informs her that Lu had replaced her head with that of a better-looking woman.

The story then recalls the life of an official named Wu (吳), whose beautiful daughter remained single because both of her fiances had died before they could get married. During a particular Lantern Festival, Wu's daughter visited the Chamber of Horrors and was followed back home by a man who first tried to rape her and then beheaded her. After discovering what had happened, her family placed her head next to her body in the hall. However, the head was later reported missing and Wu's daughter's murderer remained at large.

Back in the present day, Wu learns about the strange happenings in the Zhu household. Wu theorises that Zhu used black magic to murder his daughter and confronts him, but Zhu feigns ignorance. Although an official complaint is lodged by Wu against Zhu, there is not enough evidence to indict him. Zhu seeks Lu's help; the judge has both Wu and his wife dream of their daughter. In their dreams, the couple learn of the truth behind her death. Wu's daughter names her killer, Yang Danian (楊大年), who is soon apprehended. Wu visits Zhu again, and the two become as close as "father and son-in-law".

Thirty years later, after a string of failures in the imperial examinations, Zhu is informed by Lu that he has five days of life left. Lu advises Zhu, who now has a young son named Wei (薇), not to despair, following which the latter begins planning his own burial. The day after his death, Zhu visits his wife as a ghost and tells her that he is now working for the judge. He continues to visit his family regularly and teaches Wei how to read and write. However, some time after Wei's fifteenth birthday, Zhu tells his wife that he has been assigned to Mount Hua as its "mountain god" and must bid his family farewell for good.

Years later, Wei, now aged twenty-five, becomes an "inspecting commissioner". He is sent to Mount Hua to perform a series of rituals. On his way there, he is met by Zhu, who praises him for his accomplishments. Before disappearing, Zhu hands his son a sword, on whose blade is inscribed: "Be bold, but cautious; round in disposition, square in action." (Note: In Chinese: "膽欲大而心欲小，智欲圓而行欲方。") Wei eventually fathers five children: Chen (沉), Qian (潛), Mi (沕), Hun (渾), and Shen (深). In a dream, Zhu tells Wei to give the sword to Hun. Wei complies, and Hun becomes a celebrated official.

Pu Songling writes in his postscript: "To chop short the crane's legs and stretch the duck's is the folly of artificiality, but grafting a flower to a tree is a marvel of creativity." He adds: "Is Master Lu of Lingyang still around? Does his supernatural power still work as of old? I would like nothing more than to serve, whip in hand, as his charioteer."

== Publication history ==
Written by Pu Songling some time between the early 1670s and the early 1700s, the story titled "Lu Pan" (陸判) was first published in 1766 in Pu's collection Liaozhai zhiyi. The collection was translated by Herbert Giles as Strange Tales from a Chinese Studio (1880), with the story titled "Judge Lu". Although Giles apparently wanted to let the translated stories "speak for themselves", many of them contain footnotes that refer to comparative European literature. In "Judge Lu", Giles compares a statement by the titular character on life and death with John Stuart Mill's notion of "the illusion of imagination".

The first Baba Malay translation of Liaozhai zhiyi, titled Boekoe Boelanan – Mengambil Tjerita Dari Boekoe Liauw Tjiaj Boet Meliboerken Hati Jang Koesoet, was written by Jo Tjin Goan and published in 1895. Among the 28 Liaozhai zhiyi entries selected for translation was "Lu Pan" or "Tjerita Tjoe Djie Tan Bersobat Sama Malekat Liok Kwan Koea Dari Geredja Sip Ong Tian".

== Themes and literary significance ==
The story draws on both Buddhist and Daoist concepts in its presentation of an underworld court and the interaction between the court's judges and mortals. Using the motif of a mutilated body being restored, it suggests that the heart (as opposed to the brain) is the centre of one's intellect. According to Lin Bian and Ruiping Fan, the story endorses the notion that one's personal identity will not be affected by a literal change of head, which clearly contradicts orthodox Confucianist thought. On the other hand, Karl Yao writes that the story illustrates the "assimilation of the self into an other".

As with other Liaozhai zhiyi entries, the postscript in "Judge Lu" provides Pu's personal take on the story. As the self-styled "Historian of the Strange" (異史氏), Pu's comment about wanting to serve as Lu's chariot driver echoes what the real-life "Grand Historian" (太史) Sima Qian had written in the Shiji about Yan Ying: "I would happily serve him as his chariot driver, out of respect for him."
