= Vasily Mikhaylovich Alekseyev =

Soviet sinologist (1881–1951)

Vasiliy Mikhaylovich Alekseyev (Russian: Василий Михайлович Алексеев, 14 January [O.S. 2 January] 1881, in Saint Petersburg – May 12, 1951, in Leningrad (ibidem)) was an eminent Soviet sinologist and a member of the Soviet Academy of Sciences. In 1902 he graduated from the Saint Petersburg University and became a professor. He also worked in the British Museum, Bibliothèque nationale de France, Museum für Völkerkunde, Musée Guimet etc.

== Life ==
In 1907, he travelled along with Édouard Chavannes through several Chinese provinces, describing ancient sculptural monuments previously unknown to international scholarship, in particular the Song monuments of Henan and Tang monuments of Shaanxi. ln addition to his Professorship, Alexeev became the Curator and Senior Researcher at the Asiatic Museum. In that role, he contributed a paper on Chinese folklore to a 1918 Museum symposium, published by its parent group, the Russian Academy of Sciences. Alexeev's situation at this time, though perilous like everybody else's, had great potential, which he quickly proceeded to realize. His position at the museum gave him a realia basis: he had custody of artifacts for the study of Chinese popular tradition, including a large trove of Dunhwang documents brought back from a Russian expedition of 1914–1915. In 1919, Alexeev became associate editor, and chief of the Eastern division, of the newly founded Publishing House for World Literature. This provided a publishing outlet. Under his direction, the museum's Sinological library was expanded, catalogued, and systematically employed in research, by a team of young persons Alexeev gradually gathered around him, among them the brilliant Shchutsky.

== Work ==
Alekseyev has produced an acclaimed translation of the Strange Stories from a Chinese Studio. The first volume was published in 1922 under the title Fox's Wiles. According to Tatyana Tolstaya, "academician Alekseyev has found a special way of selecting and connecting Russian words which creates a distinctive brand of the Russian language, the one with a unique crystal grid, so to speak. The substance has not changed but has obtained new properties. While reading his texts, you get an illusion of reading a text in Chinese". Alekseyev's translations from the World War II era were collected as The Chinese Classical Prose (Китайская классическая проза) in 1958.

== Notable works ==
- Lisyi chary (Fox's Wiles, 1922)
- Monakhi volshebniki (The Wizard Monks, 1923)
- Kitayskaya ieroglificheskaya pis'mennost' i ee latinizatsiya (The Chinese Character Script and Its Romanization, 1932)
- Rasskazy o lyudyakh neobychainykh (Stories About Extraordinary People, 1937)
