= The Painted Skin =

Short story by Pu Songling

- Short story by Pu Songling
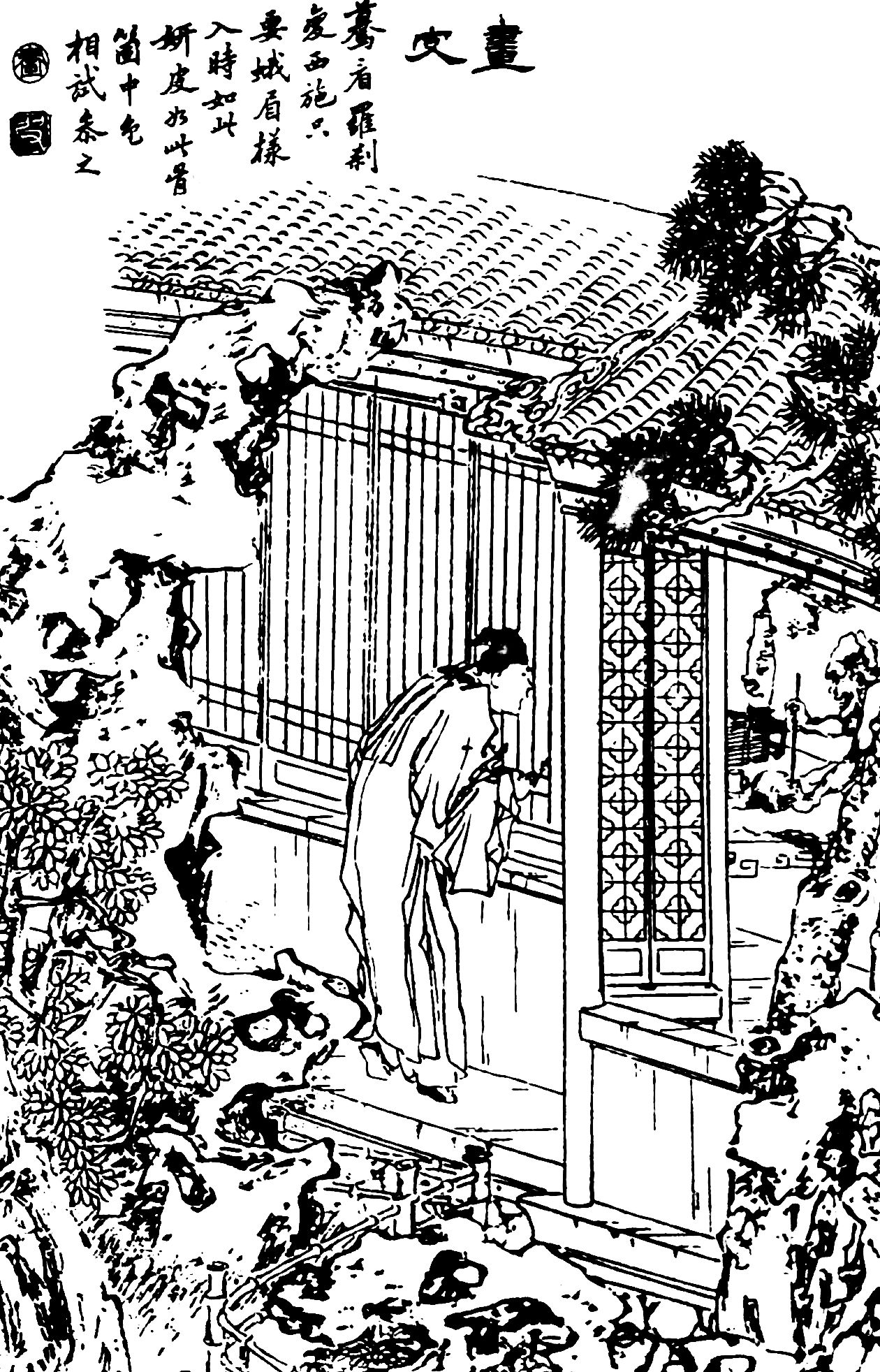
- 19th-century illustration from Xiangzhu liaozhai zhiyi tuyong (Liaozhai Zhiyi with commentary and illustrations; 1886)
- Original title: 畫皮 (Huapi)
- Translator: Herbert Giles (1880)
- Language: Chinese
- Genres: Zhiguai; Chuanqi

Publication
- Published in: Strange Tales from a Chinese Studio
- Publication date: 1740
- Publication place: China
- Media type: Print (Book)

Chronology
Qingfeng (青鳳)	Jia'er (賈兒)

"The Painted Skin"
- Traditional Chinese: 畫皮
- Simplified Chinese: 画皮
- Literal meaning: "Painted Skin"
Transcriptions
Standard Mandarin
- Hanyu Pinyin: Huàpí
- Wade–Giles: Hua^{4}-p'i^{2}
- IPA: [xwâpʰǐ]
Wu
- Romanization: Ghô-bi
Yue: Cantonese
- Yale Romanization: Waah-pèih
- Jyutping: Waa6-pei4
Southern Min
- Tâi-lô: Uē-phuê

"The Painted Skin" (Chinese: 畫皮; pinyin: Huàpí) is a short story by the Chinese writer Pu Songling collected in Strange Tales from a Chinese Studio in 1740. Literary critics have recognised it as one of the best and best-known entries in Strange Tales; in particular, its textual detail and in-depth characterisation are lauded. "The Painted Skin" has also received numerous adaptations in popular media, especially in film. The story's original title has become a common phrase in Chinese vocabulary, "a synonym for duplicity that wears an outwardly human face but is inwardly demonic".

Set in Shandong, the story revolves around a Chinese scholar, Wang, who becomes infatuated with a demon disguised as a beautiful young maiden. They develop a romantic relationship which goes awry after Wang discovers her true identity. Thereafter, a Taoist priest's skills are put to the task of exorcising the demon; a fight between good and evil ensues.

== Plot ==
An academician from Taiyuan, referred to only by his surname, Wang, chances upon a homeless girl who claims to be an ill-treated concubine. Noting her beauty as well as feeling pity for her, Wang agrees to let her stay at his residence temporarily. They make love in his study, unbeknownst to anybody else. A few days afterward, Wang's spouse, Chen, discovers their affair and is unhappy with the arrangement; but she fails to change her husband's mind.

At the marketplace, a Taoist priest informs Wang that he has been possessed by an evil spirit. The incredulous Wang dismisses this. Returning home, he finds the gates locked but manages to find a way into the courtyard, where he finds that the front door is bolted too. Peeking through the window, Wang makes a startling discovery: the girl is actually a "green-faced monster, a ghoul with great jagged teeth like a saw." All this while, she had been wearing a mask made of human skin, on which her attractive features were painted.

Shocked, Wang returns to the Taoist priest and begs him to help. The priest agrees but ambivalently wishes to be lenient with a fellow sentient being, and thus offers Wang only a charm meant to ward off demons. (Note: A chenwei, or chowry, representative of "purity, detachment, and supernatural power" and an "instrument of magic" in Taoism.) Wang returns home and hangs the charm outside his bedroom; but it has no effect on the demon. Instead, she turns enraged and rips out Wang's heart. Wang's spouse reports this to the priest who, incited to fury, launches a full-scale offensive against the demon. The priest and Chen find that the demon has transformed itself into an elderly helper working at Wang's brother's place. In the climax, the demon reverts to its original form, and the priest beheads it with his wooden sword. The demon's remains dissolve into smoke which the priest stores in his calabash. He also rolls up the demon's "painted skin" and stores it away.

Later, the priest tells Chen to visit a lunatic beggar at the marketplace if she wishes to revive her husband. The madman treats her with disrespect by continuously demeaning her, but she takes this in stride and patiently pleads with him for help. Finally, he coughs forth some phlegm (Note: The original Chinese term "痰", meaning phlegm, is translated as "a perfectly loathsome pill" by Giles.) and makes her swallow it. The beggar departs and Chen is left feeling deeply ashamed. Back home, during funeral preparations, the phlegm gradually hardens and rises from Chen's stomach to her throat. Ultimately she disgorges a throbbing heart, which she places into the gaping wound in Wang's chest; slowly, his life is restored.

== Publication history ==
The story was originally titled "Huapi" (畫皮) and first appeared in Pu Songling's anthology of supernatural tales, Strange Tales from a Chinese Studio (Liaozhai) in 1740. It was first translated into English as "The Painted Skin" by the British sinologist Herbert A. Giles and was included in his 1880 translation of Strange Tales. It reappeared with modifications in a subsequent edition, published in 1908. Since then, many other translators, including John Minford (2006), have published their translations of "The Painted Skin".

== Themes and analysis ==
How foolish men are, to see nothing but beauty in what is clearly evil! And how benighted to dismiss as absurd what is clearly well-intended! It is folly such as this that obliges the lady Chen to steel herself to eat another man's phlegm, when her husband has fallen prey to lust. Heaven's Way has its inexorable justice, but some mortals remain foolish and never see the light!

— Pu's postscript

On the surface, "The Painted Skin" is a story of a lustful scholar's encounter with a demon who disguises itself as a lady. Pu Songling intended for the story to be viewed as a parable of human desire and its negative consequences, and emphasised this with his appended comment, "a typical piece of moral didacticism that denounces sexual promiscuity, extols faithfulness, and endorses belief in karma and retribution." "The Painted Skin" utilises both the zhiguai and chuanqi styles of writing in bringing out "the ghost's critical and creative writing", whereas the complexity of prose parallels the "cultural ramifications of the ghost."

Skin is a major plot device in "The Painted Skin", serving as a "path between the separate worlds of human and animal, or the natural and the supernatural". Reality versus perception of it is another overarching issue; what Wang deems to be a pretty female is in fact a vicious demon. Moral courage trumps the occult and supernatural powers; the Taoist priest is unable to revive Wang with his magic, whereas Chen's sacrificial love is arguably more effective in doing so. By extension, this also decreases the credibility of religious institutions, continuing Pu's subtle criticism of religion present in many other Liaozhai stories. Pu also presents the trope of the "beautiful talented ghost" in an inverted fashion, portraying art, represented by the demon, as something "utterly demonic"; Man's "blind admiration" of it can lead to his dire downfall.

== Literary significance and reception ==
Bow Fong's Huapi (1965), one of the earliest film adaptations of "The Painted Skin".

"The Painted Skin" stays true to the early style of zhiguai by showcasing the chaotic relations between "human society and the world beyond", unlike majority of Liaozhai tales which narrate peaceful coexistence between the two groups. It is also significant for being, in the words of Lu Xun, "zhiguai in the chuanqi style"; Pu was one of the earliest writers to amalgamate the two similar genres in their writings.

The story was positively received. As translator John Minford notes, "(the story) is one of the most widely read of all the Strange Tales ... and continues to be popular for its powerful theme and the sheer gruesomeness of its detail." Pu Songling is praised by literary critics for offering readers vivid characterisation and an emboldened stance against lust. Qing dynasty critic Dan Minglun (但明倫) offers in his 1842 interlinear commentary of Liaozhai, "(Wang) is clearly a man in the grip of a serious sexual delusion ... (Chen) should not bother bringing her worthless husband back from the dead." Translator Allan Barr writes that "Pu at times transforms (the characters in "Huapi") ... from dangerous succubi into sympathetic figures, who are stricken with guilt when they imperil their partners' lives." Taiwanese writer Yi-jia Wang (王溢嘉) provides a psychoanalytical review of "The Painted Skin", describing Wang as relying on his wife to restore "the Deep Structure of male-dominated Chinese culture."

Due to its widespread popularity and usage, the term huapi (畫皮) became a Chinese idiom. According to Mair and Mair, "the words “painted skin” have become a synonym for duplicity that wears an outwardly human face but is inwardly demonic." During the rise of Communist China, led by Chairman Mao Zedong, the meaning of huapi took on a political undertone; at different points in time it was used to describe United States colonisation, USSR revisionists, as well as the Gang of Four, amongst a host of other political factions or figures. In 21st-century China, huapi is still used in political contexts, but generally means refers to the "mask of an evildoer" and has been used in conjunction with "quack herbal cures" and "fake cell-phones".

== Inspiration ==
Before "The Painted Skin", there was already a plethora of zhiguai-chuanqi stories about lady–beast metamorphosis. An account in the fifth-century anthology of fictitious accounts titled Garden of the Strange (Yi yuan 異苑) by Liu Jingshu (劉敬叔) concerns a bachelor named Xu Huan (徐桓) who gets acquainted with a tiger spirit passing off as a beautiful woman. Blinded by lust, Xu is kidnapped by the tiger, who returns him home after ten days. Tang dynasty writer Xue Yongruo (薛用弱) penned a story on a Puzhou native, Cui Tao, who marries a tiger spirit that ultimately devours their child and him. "Scholar Wu of Jiangnan" (江南吳生) by Zhang Du (張讀) revolves around the Wu household, and Wu's eventual discovery that his spouse, Madam Liu, is a demon. Pu Songling, in writing "The Painted Skin" and many of the other Liaozhai entries, is written to have been inspired by the above-mentioned zhiguai texts, and expanded upon the early authors' efforts.

== Legacy and adaptations ==
"The Painted Skin" was adapted into Japanese in 1792 by the scholar and popular author Morishima Chūryō and, a century later, by the writer Koganei Kimiko, younger sister of Mori Ōgai.

In the modern era, "The Painted Skin" has been adapted or represented in film, television, and cartoons on numerous occasions. The long list of adaptations underscore the story's enduring legacy; in particular, it is written to have inspired generations of filmmakers. One of the earliest film adaptations of the story is Bow Fong's Huapi (1965). A rumoured 1970s Painted Skin film was reportedly banned in China after a short run at the box office because of its overly intense horror scenes – it is claimed that some audience members died of fright. Its existence, however, has yet to be proven. King Hu's last film was a "faithful" adaptation of "The Painted Skin", released in 1992. Other film adaptations of the story include Painted Skin (2008), and its sequel Painted Skin: The Resurrection (2012).

A television series based on "The Painted Skin", directed by Danny Ko, was first broadcast in 2011. In 2001, China Post issued commemorative Liaozhai postage stamps in Shandong, the birthplace of Pu Songling. Amongst the collection is one depicting a scene in "The Painted Skin"; others show scenes from entries such as "Yingning" and "Stealing Peaches".
