= Three Lives (short story) =

- Short story by Pu Songling
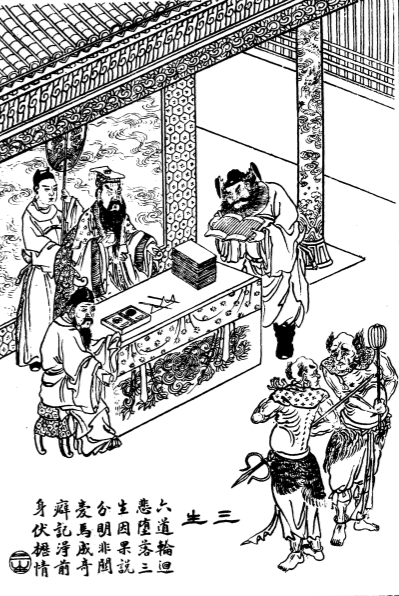
- Yama reviews Liu's record; 19th-century illustration from Xiangzhu liaozhai zhiyi tuyong (Liaozhai with commentary and illustrations; 1886)
- Original title: 三生 (Sansheng)
- Translator: Sidney L. Sondergard
- Country: China
- Language: Chinese
- Genres: Zhiguai; Chuanqi; Short story

Publication
- Published in: Strange Stories from a Chinese Studio
- Publication type: Anthology
- Publication date: c. 1740
- Published in English: 2008

Chronology
Wild Dog (野狗)	Fox in a Bottle (狐入瓶)

"Three Lives" (Chinese: 三生; pinyin: Sānshēng) is a short story by Pu Songling first published in Strange Tales from a Chinese Studio which follows the past lives of a scholar. It has been adapted into a play and translated into English.

== Plot ==
A juren surnamed Liu often narrates tales from his past lives to his peer, Wenbi (文贲). (Note: Pu Songling's elder brother, Zhaochang (兆昌), whose courtesy name was Wenbi.) Many incarnations ago, Liu was an unnamed government official who died aged 62; in the Underworld, he is initially well-received by Yama, but is subsequently condemned to rebirth as a horse when his multiple transgressions come to light. Unhappy with life in the stable, Liu/Horse starves himself for three days and returns to hell. However, Yama determines Liu's atonement to be insufficient, and has him reborn as a dog. Again suicidal, Liu/Dog attacks his owner, who whips him to death. Back in hell, Yama angrily whips Liu "several hundred times", after which he is sent back to Earth as a snake. In a change of heart, Liu/Snake resolves to lead an ascetic lifestyle; one day he slithers towards an oncoming cart and is sliced in half. Yama finally pardons him; thus he is reborn as Liu the scholar, who is presently able to better empathise with other animals. In his postscript, Pu emphasises the importance of doing good.

== Background ==
Originally titled "Sansheng" (三生), (Note: A later entry in Strange Tales from a Chinese Studio is also titled "Sansheng" or "Three Incarnations".) "Three Lives" is believed to be one of the earlier entries that Pu wrote for his anthology that was published in around 1740; it was fully translated into English by the first volume of Sidney L. Sondergard's Strange Tales from a Chinese Studio published in 2008. As Allan Barr opines in his Comparative Studies of Early and Late Tales in Liaozhai Zhiyi (1985), "Three Lives", like "The Weeping Ghosts", warns "men in high positions to behave according to proper moral principles". According to Frances Weightman, the thematic use of reincarnation as a retributive device in "Three Lives" highlights the "Buddhist influence underlying much of the portrayal of the animal world", insofar as Liu's punishment is to be reborn as different animals.

== Adaptations ==
Hangzhou playwright Hu Hanchi's directorial debut, "The Wheel of Time", is based on "Three Lives"; it stars Hu in all four roles as Liu and his animal incarnations, and also features Chinese opera, hip-hop and a "live band". It premiered in July 2016 at the National Academy of Chinese Theatre Arts.
