= Strange Tales from a Chinese Studio =

Qing dynasty book of short stories

- Cover of a 1920 edition of Strange Tales from a Chinese Studio (volume three), published by the Youzheng Book Company
- Author: Pu Songling
- Original title: 聊齋誌異
- Language: Classical Chinese
- Genre: Zhiguai chuanqi
- Publication date: 1766
- Publication place: China

Liaozhai zhiyi
- Traditional Chinese: 聊齋誌異
- Simplified Chinese: 聊斋志异
Transcriptions
Standard Mandarin
- Hanyu Pinyin: Liáozhāi zhìyì
- Wade–Giles: Liao^{2}chai^{1} chi^{1}yi^{4}
Yue: Cantonese
- Jyutping: Liu4zaai1 zi3ji6

Liaozhai zhiyi, sometimes shortened to Liaozhai, or known in English as Strange Tales from a Chinese Studio (Chinese: 聊齋誌異, liáozhāi zhìyì), (Note: Also translated as Strange Stories from a Chinese Studio, Strange Tales from Make-Do Studio, or most literally Strange Tales from a Studio of Leisure) is a collection of Classical Chinese stories by Qing dynasty writer Pu Songling, comprising close to 500 stories or "marvel tales" in the zhiguai and chuanqi styles, which according to some critics, served to implicitly criticise societal problems.

Written over a period of forty years from the late 1600s and ending in the early 1700s, it circulated in manuscripts that were copied and recopied among the author's friends but did not appear in print until 1766. Since then, many of the critically lauded stories have been adapted for other media such as film and television.

== Publication history ==
An excerpt from the original manuscript of Strange Tales from a Chinese Studio by Pu Songling

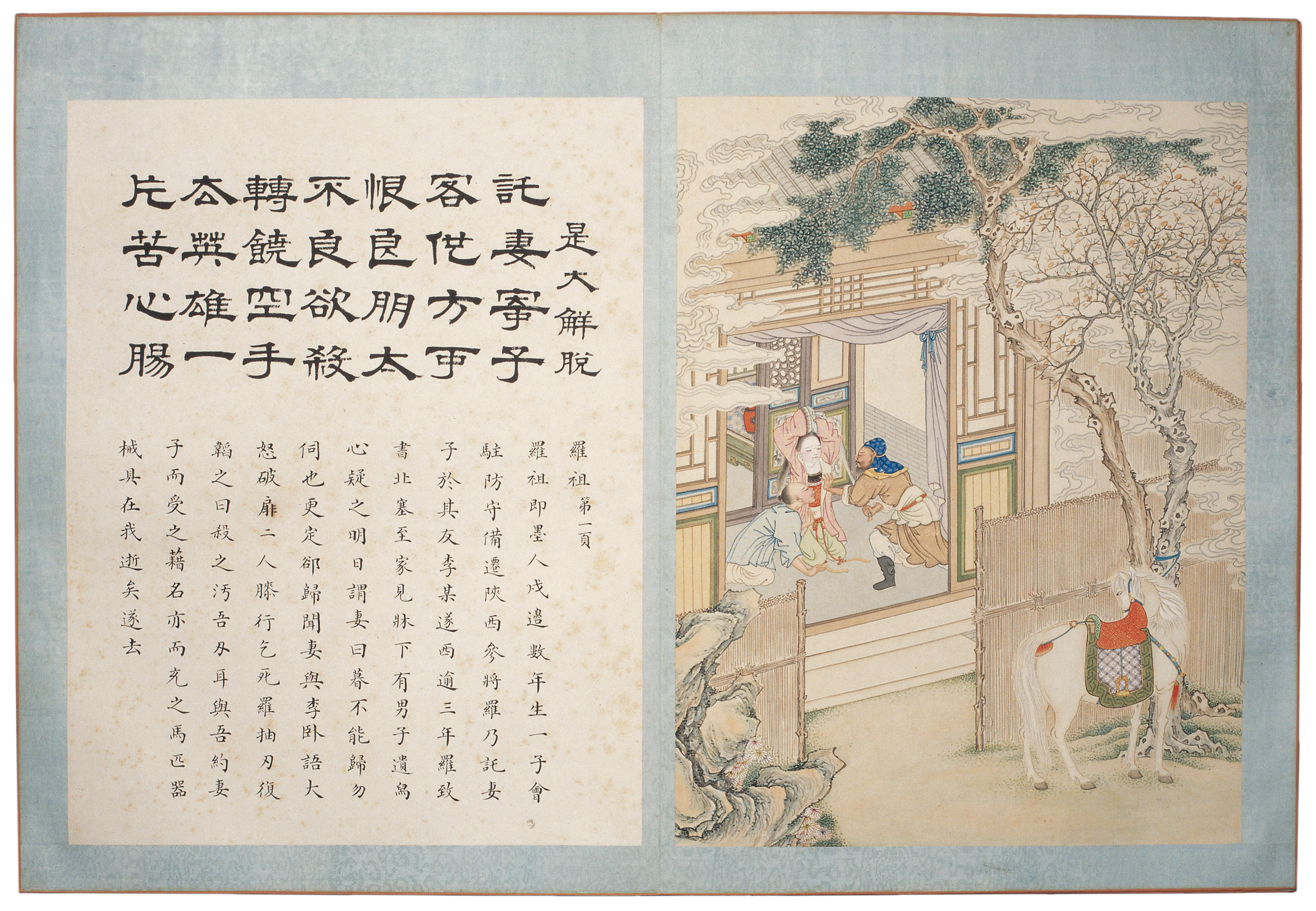
A depiction of the story "Luo Zu", from an illustrated edition located in the National Museum of China

Pages from a printed edition from the Qianlong era, from the Shanghai Library

Pages from a printed edition from late 19th-century

Pu assembled the nearly five hundred short and lengthy tales over a period of forty years between the early 1670s and the early 1700s. As was the convention of his time, Pu titled his work using the sobriquet Liaozhai (聊齋), translated into English as the "Studio of Conversation" or "Studio of Leisure".

The scholar Zhang Peiheng (章培恒) writes that the original Liaozhai comprised eight volumes, the earliest completed around 1681 and the latest completed between 1707 and 1714. The compilation was first circulated in scribal copies but it was not published until after the author's death in 1715. Around 1693, Shandong financial commissioner Yu Chenglong reportedly offered Pu a thousand taels in exchange for his Liaozhai manuscript, but Pu declined his offer.

The final manuscript was "carefully preserved" by the Pu family after his death, with many different individuals, including the local magistrate, requesting to make copies of it. The earliest surviving print version of Liaozhai was printed in 1766 in Hangzhou by publisher Zhao Qigao (趙起杲), who claimed that Pu originally intended for his anthology to be titled Tales of Ghosts and Foxes (鬼狐傳). Although Zhao also alleged that his publication was based on the "original manuscript" as was copied by a friend, it did not contain all the stories found in the original manuscript; in the preface to his publication, he writes, "I have expunged simple and brief notes which are dull and commonplace, forty-eight in all." Moreover, Zhao censored stories that had "brief references to sensitive topics". Nonetheless, the Zhao edition was well-received and was first republished by scholar Li Shixian (李時憲) in 1767.

At some point after 1871, Pu Jieren (普价人), a seventh-generation descendant of Pu Songling, had the original manuscript, which was reportedly made up of twenty volumes, rebound in eight volumes. They were then kept in two boxes, one of which disappeared "under circumstances which are still obscure". In 1950, the Pu family donated the surviving four volumes, which contained some 237 short stories, to the Liaoning Provincial Library.

== Themes ==
Unlike much Chinese and Western horror fiction, the "scary stories" in Liaozhai are not intended to be frightening, but to blur the borders between the supernatural and everyday reality, using physical and psychological detail to make the move between these realms seem natural. These tales, which are "works rich in romanticism", explore the philosophical concept of qing (情), the passionate and emotional entanglement of the world, be it human or supernatural.

== Literary significance ==
Liaozhai zhiyi is the most acclaimed Chinese "supernatural tales" collection since the three major Ming dynasty deng (燈) or lamp collections, which are the Jiandeng Xinhua (剪燈新話) by Qu You, the Jiandeng Yuhua (剪燈餘話) by Li Changqi, and the Mideng Yinhua (覓燈因話) by Shao Jingzhan; these three had a far-reaching impact across East Asia.

Early commentary on Liaozhai regarded it as a "superior but typical example" of the zhiguai genre. Subsequent critics and writers disagreed with such a view, instead focusing on the allegorical nature of the stories instead; for instance, Yu Ji, who was Zhao Qigao's secretary, wrote in his preface to Zhao's edition of Liaozhai: "... saying that it differs little from collections of rare phenomena or strange tales is a very shallow view and one that greatly contradicts the author's intent." Pu's grandson, Pu Lide (蒲立德), viewed the work as "an act of serious self-expression".

Feng Zhenluan wrote that "Among the works of fiction written by contemporary writers, Liaozhai must rank first," and "it is not only a work of exceptional prose style and literary merit ... but also truly a profoundly moral and ethical book." Chen Tingji wrote "It is an unprecedented and unparalleled collection; if writers from Tang dynasty were to see this [Liaozhai], they would've welcomed him [Pu] as a fellow genius ..." Ji Xiaolan wrote "In terms of literary artistry and talent, I cannot measure even to one ten-thousandth of his."

Still later critics in the nineteenth century focused on the "literary style and narrative technique" of Liaozhai. Qing dynasty critic Dan Minglun (但明倫) writes in the preface to his 1842 interlinear commentary of Liaozhai: "From Liaozhai, I also gained insight into literary methods." Around the same period, Liaozhai also attracted critical attention from Western writers, for example, Samuel Wells Williams mentioned Liaozhai in his writings as "a perfect work with pure language and elegant style" and its "beautiful writing style" has also received praises from the likes of William Frederick Mayers and Karl Gützlaff.

Since the 20th century, its literary status has been further elevated. Guo Moruo said of Liaozhai that "The writing of ghosts and demons is superior to all others; the satire on corruption and tyranny is penetrating to the marrow." Yuken Fujita of Keio University wrote in 1954 that "Among the many literary works that are descended from ancient Chinese fiction [i.e. Bowuzhi, Soushen Ji, Shishuo Xinyu, Lieyi Zhuan, Shi Yi Ji, etc.], it [Liaozhai] has already established a reputation as the most outstanding short story collection." Hiromasa Imai describes Liaozhai as "the pinnacle of ghost literature." Strange Tales from a Chinese Studio was also listed by Jorge Luis Borges as one of his favorite books.

== Influence ==
Following Liaozhai zhiyi's critical and commercial success, other well-received "wonder tale" and "fantasy" story collections also soon appeared, creating a publishing craze for such literature in China well into the 19th century. Some notable major collections include Yuan Mei's Zibuyu (What the Master Would Not Discuss, 1788), Changbai Haogezhi's Yingchuang yicao (1768-1788), Shen Qifeng's Xie Duo (1791), Ji Yun's Yuewei caotang biji (Notes of the Thatched Abode of Close Observations, 1789-1798 & 1800) and Wang Tao's Songyin manlu (1875) and Songbin suohua (1887).

The collection also quickly gained popularity in Japan, with the first adaptations and imitations appearing in the late eighteenth century and translations of selected stories first published in the early nineteenth century. Ryunosuke Akutagawa's "The Wine Worm" (1916) is an adaptation of the story "Jiu chong" ("The Wine Worm") from Liaozhai zhiyi.

Spin-offs, homages and derivative works of Liaozhai zhiyi
Hou Liaozhai zhiyi (Later Liaozhai zhiyi) (後聊齋志異)

Women's Liaozhai zhiyi (女聊齋志異)

Xin Liaozhai (New Liaozhai) (新聊齋)

Xin Xin Liaozhai (新新聊齋)

Supplmental Collection of Liaozhai zhiyi (聊齋志異外集)

== Translations ==
=== English ===
==== Unabridged ====
- Strange Tales from Liaozhai, 6 volumes (tr. Sidney L. Sondergard). Jain Pub Co., 2008-2014. approx. 2,600 pages. ISBN 978-0-89581-001-4.

==== Excerpts and abridgements ====
- Strange Tales from a Chinese Studio (tr. John Minford). London: Penguin, 2006. 562-608 pages (depending on the editions). ISBN 0-14-044740-7.
- Strange Tales from the Liaozhai Studio (Zhang Qingnian, Zhang Ciyun and Yang Yi). Beijing: People's China Publishing, 1997. ISBN 7-80065-599-7.
- Strange Tales from Make-do Studio (Denis C. & Victor H. Mair). Beijing: Foreign Languages Press, 1989. ISBN 7-119-00977-X.
- Strange Tales of Liaozhai (Lu Yunzhong, Chen Tifang, Yang Liyi, and Yang Zhihong). Hong Kong: Commercial Press, 1982.
- Strange Stories from the Lodge of Leisure (George Soulie). London: Constable, 1913.
- Strange Stories from a Chinese Studio (tr. Herbert A. Giles). London: T. De La Rue, 1880; 2nd ed. revised, London, 1908; 3rd ed. revised, London, Laurie, 1916. Reprinted with a new foreword by Victoria Cass. Tokyo, Rutland, Vt.: Tuttle, 2010. ISBN 978-0-8048-9408-1.

==== Giles's translation ====
John Minford and Tong Man describe Herbert Giles's translation as "prudish", because he chose not to translate "anything connected with sex, procreation, blood, sometimes indeed the human body in any of its aspects" and often made "extraordinary lengths to cover up his traces, showing considerable craft and cunning." In the Giles translation, fox spirits wish to chat and share tea with people rather than trying to seduce and engage in sexual intercourse, and romantic partners at most exchange kisses. They wrote that "Giles was a creature of his time" since he was required to follow Victorian Era morality, and urged readers to "not get Giles' bowdlerising of Liao-chai out of proportion." They added that "the widely distributed Commercial Press (HK) edition of the stories makes many of the same prudish cuts as Giles."

Minford and Tong Man write that people have continued reading Giles's translations even though they "have been at best quietly tolerated, more often derided, and dismissed as orientalist bowdlerisations..." Lydia Chiang describes Minford and Tong Man's essay as a "post-Saidian re-evaluation" that compares the Giles translation to traditional and modern Chinese representations of the story.

=== German ===
Martin Buber made the first German translation of the work, included within his Chinesische Geister- und Liebesgeschichten. Buber had assistance from a person named Wang Jingdao. Buber stated in the preface of his translation that his translation had portions previously untranslated in Giles work because Giles, according to the "English custom", had "omitted or paraphrased all passages which seemed to him indecorous". The Chinesische Geister- und Liebesgeschichten was translated into English by Alex Page, published in 1991 by the Humanities Press. Buber's German translation of Liaozhai zhiyi stories were also read by the likes of Franz Kafka.

=== Other translations ===
Ishikawa Masamochi published Japanese translations of fourteen stories from Liaozhai zhiyi in the late 1820s. The first modern Japanese translation of a selection of stories was published in 1906 and included 46 tales. A complete Japanese translation, by Shibata Tenma, was begun in the 1930s but not completed until the 1950s.

Vasily Mikhaylovich Alekseyev published a translation of two Liaozhai stories in 1910 in Belarusian in the newspaper Nasha Niva. It was followed by publication of an acclaimed translation of Pu Songling's stories in Russian in two volumes, Fox's Wiles (1922) and The Wizard Monks (1923). It has been cited as the most accomplished translation of the book into a foreign language.

The book was translated into Manchu as Sonjofi ubaliyambuha Liyoo jai jy i bithe. Lodovico Nicola di Giura (1868–1947) produced a complete Italian translation of the 1766 edition. In France, a complete French translation is also available : "Chroniques de l'étrange", translated by André Lévy, Ed. Philippe Picquier, coll. « Dix mille feuilles », 2 vol., 2005, 2016 pages.

A page from Herbert Allen Giles's translation in English

A page from Vasily Mikhaylovich Alekseyev's translation in Belarusian

Pages from Kotaro Tanaka's translation in Japanese

A page from Shibata Tenma's translation in Japanese

== Illustrated editions ==
In the 19th century, colorful and fully illustrated collector's editions of Liaozhai zhiyi also circulated onto the literary scenes. These exquisitely mounted illustrated Liaozhai are now collected by major libraries and museums around the world, such as the National Library of China and Library of Congress.

Painted stories from an illustrated edition of Liaozhai zhiyi from the late Qing Guangxu period; this edition is located in the Austrian National Library.
"The Painted Skin"

"Jia er"

"Dong Sheng"

"Judge Lu"

"Nie Xiaoqian"

"Mr. Miao"

"Mao Hu"

"Jia Fengzhi"

"Three Incarnations"

"Xi Seng"

== Adaptations ==
Liaozhai Zhiyi has inspired many Chinese film adaptations, including those by King Hu (Painted Skin, A Touch of Zen), Gordon Chan (Painted Skin, Mural), Ching Siu-tung (A Chinese Ghost Story series) and the Taiwanese director Li Han-Hsiang (The Enchanting Shadow). Jonathan D. Spence's The Death of Woman Wang. (New York: Viking Press, 1978). ISBN 0670262323, also uses material from Liaozhai Zhiyi to set the background.

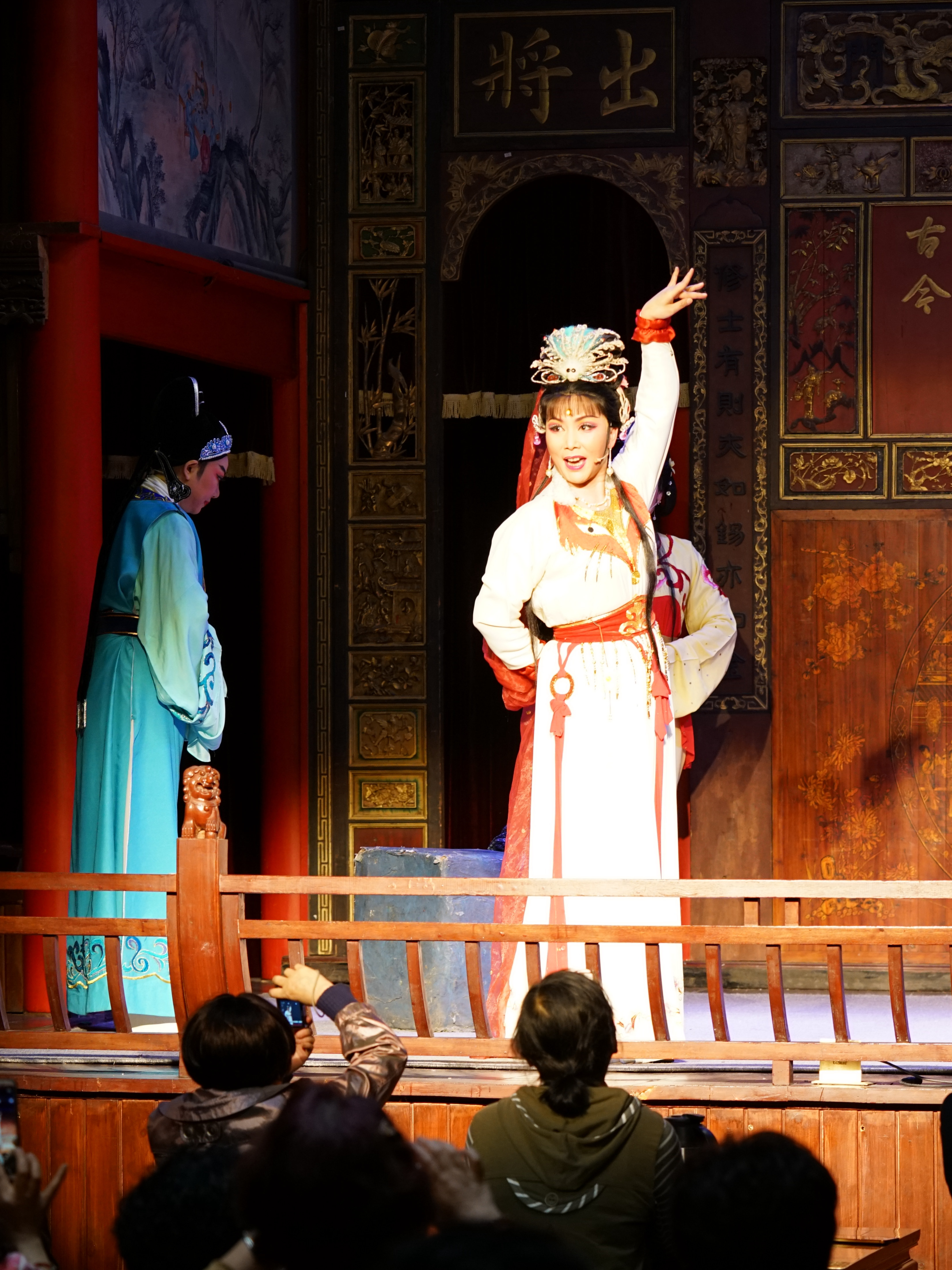
The Scholar Meets the Fairy (秀才遇仙記), a Yue opera based on "Zhang Hongjian", Nanjing, 5 May 2019

Two Bridal Sedan Chairs (雙轎接親), a Yue opera based on "Shanhu", 3 July 2019

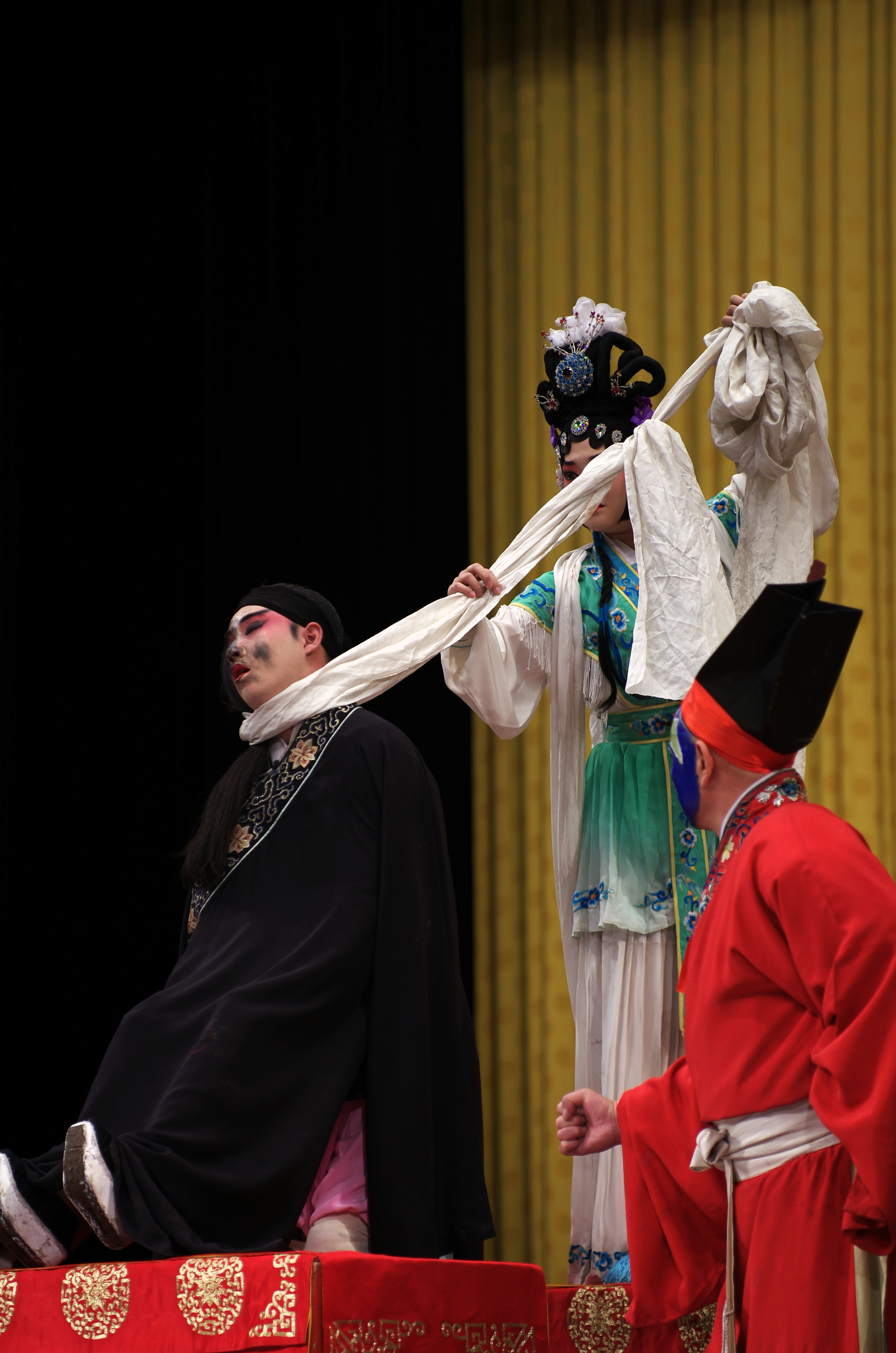
Capturing Shi Huaiyu Alive (活捉石懷玉), a Sichuan opera based on "Wu Xiaolian" (武孝廉), Shanghai, 10 June 2016
