= Consort Yu (Xiang Yu's wife) =

Wife of Xiang Yu

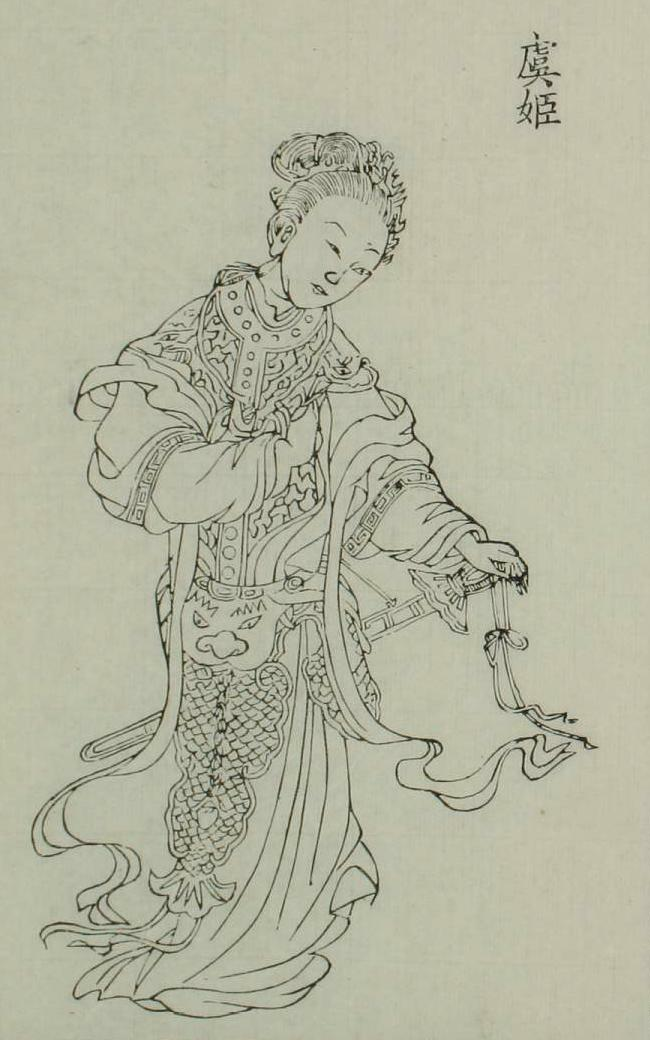
- A portrait of Consort Yu from Baimei Xinyong Tuzhuan (百美新詠圖傳) by Yan Xiyuan
- Born: Jiangsu
- Died: 202 BC; Lingbi County, Anhui
- Other name: "Yu the Beauty"
- Spouse: Xiang Yu
- Relatives: Yu Ziqi (brother)

Consort Yu (虞姬; died 202 BC), also known as "Yu the Beauty" (虞美人), was the wife of the warlord Xiang Yu, who competed with Liu Bang, the founding emperor of the Han dynasty, for supremacy over China during the Chu–Han Contention (206–202 BC).

== Life ==
Consort Yu's full name and birth date are not recorded in history, although there are two differing accounts on her origin. The first claimed that she was from Yanji Town (顏集鎮) in Shuyang County, while the second mentioned that she was from Suzhou; both accounts agreed that she was born in present-day Jiangsu.

In 209 BC, when Xiang Yu and his uncle Xiang Liang started a rebellion to overthrow the Qin dynasty, Consort Yu's brother, Yu Ziqi (虞子期), joined their rebel group. During this time, Consort Yu met Xiang Yu and became his consort, and had accompanied him whenever he went to battle ever since then.

In 202 BC, Xiang Yu came under attack by his rival Liu Bang (the King of Han) during the Battle of Gaixia. The Han soldiers started singing folk songs from the Chu lands to evoke feelings of nostalgia among Xiang Yu's troops, who were mostly from Chu, and create the false impression that many of Xiang Yu's men had surrendered and joined the Han forces. The morale of Xiang Yu's forces plummeted and several of his men deserted. In despair, Xiang Yu consumed alcohol and sang the "Song of Gaixia" to express his sorrow. Consort Yu also performed a sword dance and sang a song in return, expressing her willingness to die with him. Xiang Yu ultimately made a last stand against Liu Bang's forces and took his own life when he was overwhelmed by the enemy. Although Consort Yu's eventual fate was not recorded in history, cultural works commonly depict her committing suicide by slitting her throat with Xiang Yu's sword shortly after she had sung her song.

A Consort Yu Tomb stands in present-day Lingbi County, Anhui.

== Song of Consort Yu ==
This verse was sung by Consort Yu after Xiang Yu sang the "Song of Gaixia".

漢兵已略地，

Han forces have conquered our land;

四面楚歌聲。

Surrounded by Chu songs;

大王義氣盡，

My King's spirits are low;

賤妾何聊生。

Why then should I live?

== Cultural references ==
The romance of Xiang Yu and Consort Yu has been the subject of plays, films and television series even though not much about Consort Yu was recorded in history. The story was reenacted on stage in the Peking opera The Hegemon-King Bids His Lady Farewell, which is also a trope of the Palme d'Or-winning film Farewell, My Concubine. Poets such as Su Shi, He Pu and Yuan Mei have written poems about Consort Yu as well. Actresses such as Idy Chan, Melissa Ng, Kristy Yang, Rosamund Kwan and Liu Yifei have portrayed Consort Yu in films and television series. In the 2012 television series Beauties of the Emperor (王的女人), she was given the name "Yu Miaoyi" (虞妙弋).

In the video game Fate/Grand Order, Consort Yu, voiced by Mariya Ise, is an Assassin-class Servant and later a Lancer-class Servant, an elemental spirit similar to a vampire, a xian and zhenren who survived to the present day under the alias Hinako Akuta and desires to reunite with Xiang Yu, who in an alternate universe, is unexpectedly a monstrous robotic Centaur programmed by Qin Shi Huang under the code name Huiji-Yishi. The Japanese version of the game refers to her as "Gu Bijin", the Japanese equivalent of "Yu Meiren", while the English version uses the Chinese reading. Along with Xiang Yu, Consort Yu appears in Shin Sangoku Musou Multi Raid 2, in which they are resurrected by Qin Shi Huang to fight the heroes of the Three Kingdoms.

In the Vietnamese allusion "cỏ Ngu Mĩ", most famously used in Nguyễn Dữ's work ⁣⁣Chuyện người con gái Nam Xương (also referred to as Nam Xương nữ tử truyện⁣, from Volume 4 of the text Truyền kì mạn lục), the story of Consort Yu is evoked indirectly. The allusion refers to the belief that after Consort Yu drew Xiang Yu's sword and committed suicide near the Wujiang River, her soul became associated with the grass growing along its banks. It is said that when the story of Consort Yu and Xiang Yu was recounted by the river, or when the Song of Consort Yu was sung, the grass would sway as if moved by the sound.
