= Văn Dĩ Thành =

Văn Dĩ Thành (chữ Hán: 文以誠; 1380–1416) was the leader of a resistance movement during the Fourth Era of Northern Domination in Vietnam in the 15th century.

== Family ==
The surname Văn Dĩ Thành's ancestors was originally Hoa and they were carpenters from Bảo Hà (Vĩnh Bảo, Haiphong). His father moved to Tổng Gối in Tân Hội commune, Đan Phượng district, Hanoi and gave birth to him there. His father Văn Dĩ Thành was ordered by Hồ Quý Ly to join the construction of Citadel of the Hồ Dynasty.

== Anti-Ming activities ==
In 1407, Hồ dynasty was defeated and Vietnam was annexed by the Ming dynasty. Văn Dĩ Thành built a resistance army with Lê Ngộ to fight the northern occupiers.

His army was based in Tổng Gối and worn black clothes, so they were called the "Black-clothed army". The movement was also called the "Black-clothed Uprising". Văn Dĩ Thành was honored as the "Black-clothed Yaksha general". He put his base in Đống Đám mound, in the middle of Dinh rice field in Thượng Hội village-one of the four villages (Vĩnh Kỳ, Thúy Hội, Thượng Hội, Phan Long) of Tổng Gối (nowadays Thượng Hội village in Tân Hội commune, Đan Phượng district, Hanoi).

The resistance movement expanded their area of operation to the Western Gate (Đoài Môn) and the West Lake (Tây Hồ) in Đông Quan, on the other side of Red River, building more bases in Hạ Lôi, Dõm Mountain, Đôi Mountain, Thanh Tước... (Mê Linh District nowadays).

He wrote the "Six Precious Commandments" to discipline his army:

One, to stockpile food as much as possible
Two, to choose strategy according to one's strength
Three, to determine to repel the Ming invaders
Four, to keep absolute secrecy
Five, to stay united
Six, to keep strict discipline

He also wrote the "Four Hopes for the Land", which is considered one of Vietnam's early declarations of independence:

For the independent country
For the free people
For the happy livelihood
For the equal rights

He was ambushed and killed by the Ming on March 12, 1416, while his right hand Lê Ngộ was away.

== Legacy ==
To honor him, the people in the region have venerated him as the guardian god and built Voi Phục temple. This temple holds 40 imperial decrees from the Lê dynasty in 1620 to Nguyễn dynasty in 1924 to posthumously grant him various titles.

Nowadays, on the rice field of Dinh in Thượng Hội village, Tân Hội commune, there is Văn Sơn tomb, which is Văn Dĩ Thành's grave according to the legend. Voi Phục temple and Văn Sơn tomb was recognized as a historical site in November, 1997.

General Văn Tiến Dũng was a descendant of Văn Dĩ Thành.

== In literature ==
Văn Dĩ Thành and Lê Ngộ were the two main characters in The Tale of the Yaksha General in Truyền kỳ mạn lục by Nguyễn Dữ.
