= The Record at Xiang King's Temple =

Vietnamese folktale

- Short story by Nguyễn Dữ
- Original title: Hạng vương từ ký
- Country: Vietnam
- Language: Sino-Vietnamese
- Genres: Chuanqi, historical fantasy, visionary

Publication
- Published in: Truyền kỳ mạn lục
- Publication date: 16th century

Chronology
| — | The Story of the Virtuous Wife in Khoái Châu |

The Record at Xiang King's Temple (chữ Hán: 項王祠記, Hạng vương từ ký) is a Vietnamese legend told in Truyền kỳ mạn lục by Nguyễn Dữ in the 16th century. It tells the story of Hồ Tông Thốc, a Trần dynasty's mandarin who has an encounter with Xiang Yu in a dream.

== In Truyền kỳ mạn lục ==
The Record at Xiang King's Temple is the first story of Nguyễn Dữ's Truyền kỳ mạn lục collection, published in the first volume.

Hồ Tông Thốc of the Trần dynasty, on a diplomatic trip to China, writes a poem at the temple of Xiang King to mock him of his defeat in the Chu–Han Contention. At night, in a dream, a man comes and invites Hồ to Xiang's palace. Xiang King welcomes him but complains about his mocking poem. Xiang justifies his defeat as the will of heaven and not by his own weakness. Hồ rebukes Xiang, citing the beheading of Song Yi, a capable general, the killing of Ziying, who had surrendered, the boiling of Han Sheng, an innocent man, and the burning of Epang Palace as causes of him losing popular support. Xiang answers that he killed Song Yi to save thousands of people from his hesitance, killed Ziying to avenge the Six Kingdoms eliminated by the Qin, killed Han Sheng for his arrogance and burned Epang Palace to disavow the extravagance of Qin Shi Huang and teach following generations of sparingness. Hồ further cites Xiang's burning of books and murdering of Emperor Yi as cruel acts while praising Han King for his restoration of uprightness and scholarship, which made Han King superior to Xiang. When Xiang is confounded by Hồ's words, his advisor Fan steps up and argues that good leadership is proven by followers' loyalty, like how Cao Jiu fought to death for Xiang, unlike how Yong Chi and Chen Xi betrayed Liu Bang. He continues to cite the suicide of Consort Yu as a proof of Xiang's dignity, in contrast to Lü Zhi who was adulterous or Consort Qi who was turned into a human swine. Fan uses Liu Bang's mockery of his own father's forthcoming execution, and his choosing of the second son over the first son as indications of his immorality. The advisor pleads to Hồ Tông Thốc to help his master clean his name from the dishonor he has unfairly suffered. The Trần's representative finds his arguments reasonable and agrees. After the party, Hồ parts way with Xiang and he wakes up as the sun rises. Hồ holds an offering at the prow of his ship before leaving.

== Historic significance ==
Truyền kỳ mạn lục is one of few books that managed to record a poem of Hồ Tông Thốc as most of his other works were confiscated by the Ming dynasty after their invasion of Đại Ngu and became lost.
