= Mōryō =

Term in Japanese folklore

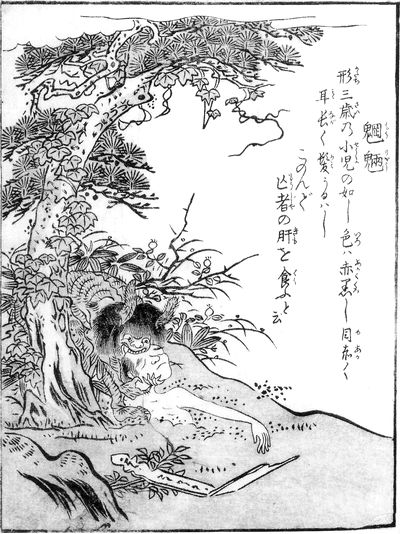
"Mōryō" (魍魎) from the Konjaku Gazu Zoku Hyakki by Toriyama Sekien

Mōryō or mizuha (魍魎, 罔両, or 美豆波) is a collective term for spirits of mountains and rivers, trees and rocks, as well as mononoke that live in places like graveyards, or kappa and various other yōkai. There is also mizu no kami as well to refer to them.

== Mythology ==
Originally, they were a kind of spirit from nature in China. In the Huainanzi, there is the statement that "mōryō have a shape like that of a three-year-old little child, are dark red in color, have red eyes, long ears, and beautiful hair." In the Compendium of Materia Medica, there is the statement "mōryō like to eat the innards of the dead. It would then perform the 'Rites of Zhou', take a dagger-axe and go into the grave hole, and bring destruction. In its true nature, the mōryō is fearful of tigers and oak, and is given the name 弗述. They go underground and eat the brains of the dead, but it is said that when an oak is pressed against their necks, they die. These are the ones called mōryō."

From the point that they like to eat the innards of the dead, in Japan mōryō are sometimes seen to be the same as the yōkai that would steal corpses of the dead, the kasha, and there can be seen examples where stories similar to that of the kasha are stated under the name mōryō. In the essay "Mimibukuro" by Negishi Shizumori in the Edo period, a government official named Shibata had a loyal retainer, but on one evening, said "I'm not a human but a mōryō" and resigned. When Shibata asked the retainer for the reason, he said it was because since it was now his turn to fulfill the role of stealing a corpse, he needs to go to a certain village. The next day, the retainer disappeared, and at a funeral in the village that he mentioned, some dark clouds suddenly covered over, and when the clouds disappeared, it is said that the corpse disappeared from the coffin.

== See also ==
- List of legendary creatures from Japan
- Chimimōryō
- Wangliang - the entity in Chinese mythology
