= The Tale of the Tea Boy Reincarnated =

Vietnamese folktale

- Short story by Nguyễn Dữ
- Original title: Trà đồng giáng đản lục
- Country: Vietnam
- Language: Sino-Vietnamese
- Genres: Chuanqi, historical fantasy

Publication
- Published in: Truyền kỳ mạn lục
- Publication date: 16th century

Chronology
| The Story of the Cotton Tree | The Record of the Strange Encounter in the Western Camp |

The Tale of the Tea Boy Reincarnated (chữ Hán: 茶童降誕錄, Trà đồng giáng đản lục) is a Vietnamese legend told in Truyền kỳ mạn lục by Nguyễn Dữ in the 16th century.

== In Truyền kỳ mạn lục ==
The Tale of the Tea Boy Reincarnated is the fourth story of Nguyễn Dữ's Truyền kỳ mạn lục collection, published in the first volume.

Dương Đức Công from Thường Tín, Sơn Nam is a magistrate under Lý Huệ Tông's rule. Because he is an honest mandarin, when he dies at 50, the Supreme Deity grants him 24 more years of life and a child, who he names Thiên Tích. Đức Công raises Thiên Tích into a righteous man.

After his father dies, Thiên Tích is mistreated and unable to find a wife because of his poverty. This makes him question of his father's teachings. A ghost named Thạch, who was saved by his father in the past, appears in front of Tích. He promises to let him marry his daughter Hán Anh and tells him not to be discouraged. Thiên Tích comes to Du Tiên District to study. A rich family sees Tích as a good man, so they take him in as a son-in-law. Thiên Tích later learns that his new wife is Hán Anh, who was saved by his father and adopted into her current family.

Years later, Thiên Tích becomes an upright official through two dynasties, but is also revengeful because of his mistreatment in the past. One day, a priest named Quân Phong shows up and informs Thiên Tích that he is the reincarnation of a tea boy in heaven serving the Supreme Deity. Quân Phong warns Thiên Tích he will suffer a tragedy after 5 years. The sage teaches him how to summon him when needed and lectures him of the principle of karma. Years later, Thiên Tích upsets the king and is exiled to the South. On the way, his boat is attacked by hundreds of demons. Thiên Tích summons the priest, who promises the demons of salvation and dispels them. After the attack, Thiên Tích says farewell to his family and disappears. Some people see him in Đông Thành Mountain and think he has attained godhood.

== Origin ==
Like many other stories in Truyền kỳ mạn lục, The Tale of the Tea Boy Reincarnated is loosely inspired by Jiandeng Xinhua of Qu You, but with strong and distinctive Vietnamese settings.
