= The Tale of the Lawsuit in Dragon Court =

Vietnamese folktale

- Short story by Nguyễn Dữ
- Original title: Long đình đối tụng lục
- Country: Vietnam
- Language: Sino-Vietnamese
- Genres: Chuanqi, historical fantasy

Publication
- Published in: Truyền kỳ mạn lục
- Publication date: 16th century

Chronology
The Record of the Strange Encounter in the Western Camp	The Record of the Wrongdoing of Đào Thị

The Tale of the Lawsuit in Dragon Court (chữ Hán: 龍庭對訟錄, Long đình đối tụng lục) is a Vietnamese legend told in Truyền kỳ mạn lục by Nguyễn Dữ in the 16th century.

== In Truyền kỳ mạn lục ==
The Tale of the Lawsuit in Dragon Court is the sixth story of Nguyễn Dữ's Truyền kỳ mạn lục collection, published in the second volume.

Vĩnh Lại District in Hồng Châu dwell many kinds of aquatic creatures, with dozens of temples for them built along rivers. In the era of Trần Minh Tông, the governor of Hồng Châu is Trịnh whose wife is Dương Thị. One day while docking next to a temple, Dương Thị is approached by servants of an aquatic lord. Although the governor tries his best to protect her, she is eventually kidnapped in a Mid-Autumn night. A devastated Trịnh resigns and comes to live by a river next to Đốn Mountain. He notes an old fortune-teller who often walks by his house. After befriending the man, Trịnh learns that he is White Dragon Marquis. Trịnh asks if he could visit the underwater world, to which the old man agrees. After seeing the extraordinary world underwater, Trịnh tells the nobleman his story. Although White Dragon Marquis refuses to use force to help Trịnh, he advises him to collect evidence to sue the kidnapper to the Dragon King. A female servant of the Marquis volunteers, so Trịnh gives her a hairpin. The girl approaches the temple of Serpent Lord and learns that the lord has married a woman named Dương and they gave birth to a child last year. She pretends to damage a tree and offers the hairpin to the lady as a compensation. Dương Thị recognizes her husband's keepsake, so she gives the girl a letter to Trịnh, urging him to rescue her soon. Trịnh and the Marquis then go to the Dragon King's palace to report the Serpent's misdeed. Although the Serpent initially denies the accusation, his crime is exposed when Dương Thị is summoned. The Dragon King is outraged and wants to execute him, but one of his officials advises against giving a verdict while being angry. The King then sentences the Serpent to prison but allows him to keep the child he had with Dương Thị, and lets her go back to her first husband. After having a celebration with the Marquis, Trịnh and Dương Thị return to the surface. A year later, Trịnh goes back to the temple and learns that it has become ruined after a giant snake appeared and swam away on the day he sued the Serpent Lord.
