= The Story of the Virtuous Wife in Khoái Châu =

Vietnamese folktale

- Short story by Nguyễn Dữ
- Original title: Khoái Châu nghĩa phụ truyện
- Country: Vietnam
- Language: Sino-Vietnamese
- Genre(s): Chuanqi, historical fantasy

Publication
- Published in: Truyền kỳ mạn lục
- Publication date: 16th century

Chronology
The Record at Xiang King's Temple	The Story of the Cotton Tree

The Story of the Virtuous Wife in Khoái Châu (chữ Hán: 快州義婦傳, Khoái Châu nghĩa phụ truyện) is a Vietnamese legend told in Truyền kỳ mạn lục by Nguyễn Dữ in the 16th century.

== In Truyền kỳ mạn lục ==
The Story of the Virtuous Wife in Khoái Châu is the second story of Nguyễn Dữ's Truyền kỳ mạn lục collection, published in the first volume.

Từ Đạt from Khoái Châu and Phùng Lập Ngôn are fellow government officials and close friends. Phùng's son Trọng Quỳ and Từ's daughter Nhị Khanh are betrothed to each other. While Nhị Khanh is a praiseworthy housewife, Trọng Quỳ is more wayward. Thanks to his father's influence, he also receives a government position at 20. When Nghệ An is regularly raided by bandits, Phùng Lập Ngôn's haters nominate him for the head position of the troubled region. As Nhị Trang is not allowed to accompany them, Trọng Quỳ is hesitant to leave, but she convinces him to go. Nhị Khanh's parents later die and she lives with her aunt. After 6 years, the aunt wants Nhị Khanh to remarry, but she refuses and sends a servant to Nghệ An to probe for her husband's information. The man travels through the wartorn region and learns that Phùng Lập Ngôn has passed away while Trọng Quỳ has bankrupted. He makes contact with the young master, who then decides to go back. Even after Trọng Quỳ and Nhị Khanh reunite, his indiscipline still remains. He often hangs out and gambles with a tradesman named Đỗ Tam. Trọng Quỳ eventually loses a bet and has to give up his wife to the tradesman. Nhị Thanh pretends to comply, but then commits suicide, which devastates Trọng Quỳ. One day on the way to Quy Hóa, he hears the voice of his wife directing him to Trưng Kings Temple. At the temple, he sees Nhị Khanh and learns that the Supreme Deity has appointed her soul to a position at the temple. She tells him that the Hồ dynasty will end in 1406, and after a period of turmoil, a hero will emerge from the southwest and that he should guide their two children to follow him. Their children later become close retainers of Lê Thái Tổ.

== Other variations ==
A shorter variation of the story, simply named "Nhị Khanh", was told in Nam Hải dị nhân liệt truyện (lit. 'Biographies of strange people in the Southern Sea') by Phan Kế Bính in 1909.
