= The Record of the Strange Encounter in the Western Camp =

Vietnamese folktale

- Short story by Nguyễn Dữ
- Original title: Tây viên kỳ ngộ ký
- Country: Vietnam
- Language: Sino-Vietnamese
- Genre(s): Chuanqi, historical fantasy, erotic

Publication
- Published in: Truyền kỳ mạn lục
- Publication date: 16th century

Chronology
The Tale of the Tea Boy Reincarnated	The Tale of the Lawsuit in Dragon Court

The Record of the Strange Encounter in the Western Camp (chữ Hán: 西垣奇遇記, Tây viên kỳ ngộ ký) is a Vietnamese legend told in Truyền kỳ mạn lục by Nguyễn Dữ in the 16th century.

== In Truyền kỳ mạn lục ==
The Record of the Strange Encounter in the Western Camp is the fifth story of Nguyễn Dữ's Truyền kỳ mạn lục collection, published in the first volume.

Hà Nhân from Thiên Trương comes to the capital in the era of Thiệu Bình to study with master Ức Trai. On his way to school, he often passes by the Western Camp, formerly owned by a Grand Preceptor from the Trần dynasty, and comes to know Liễu Nhu Nương and Đào Hồng Nương, who claim to be concubines of the Grand Preceptor. Hà Nhân invites them to his lodging and spends the night with them, and they pay him a visit every night. After accidentally upsetting Đào for favoring Liễu, he writes a poem to apologize to her, and they reconcile. On the First Full Moon Festival, the girls invite Hà Nhân to their place, and they hold a party in a luxuriant garden full of flowers in the Camp. They are soon joint by beauties whose names are Vi, Lý, Mai, Dương, Kim, Thạch. The party lasts all night before everyone leaves in the morning.

After a few months, Hà Nhân learns that his parents are arranging a marriage for him. Although he is hesitant, the girls convince him to comply. When he returns to his hometown, he tells his parents to delay the marriage until he could make his mark, to which they agree. Hà Nhân comes back to the Western Camp and reunites with the duo, but his association with them causes him to neglect studying. As time passes and winter comes, Liễu and Đào one day tell Hà Nhân that they have contracted an incurable disease and will die that night before giving him their shoes as keepsakes. After a stormy night, Hà Nhân visits an elder in the neighborhood and tells him the story. The elder is surprised as the Western Camp has been abandoned for twenty years. He and Hà Nhân go to the place, which is now a barren garden. The old man points out that the beauties' names are just those of flowers and he had been bewitched by flowers' mirages. Shocked by the truth, Hà Nhân goes back and checks the shoes, which then turn into petals and fly away. He sets up an altar for the girls and reads a eulogy to them. The duo appears in his dream to express their gratitude before disappearing.

== Literary significance ==
The fifth story in Nguyễn Dư's collection is notably one of the rare and daring examples of Vietnamese pre-modern erotic literature, moreover when it depicts a threesome relationship, although its sexuality is still covered up by the author using supernatural elements.
