= Yaoguai =

Creature from Chinese mythology

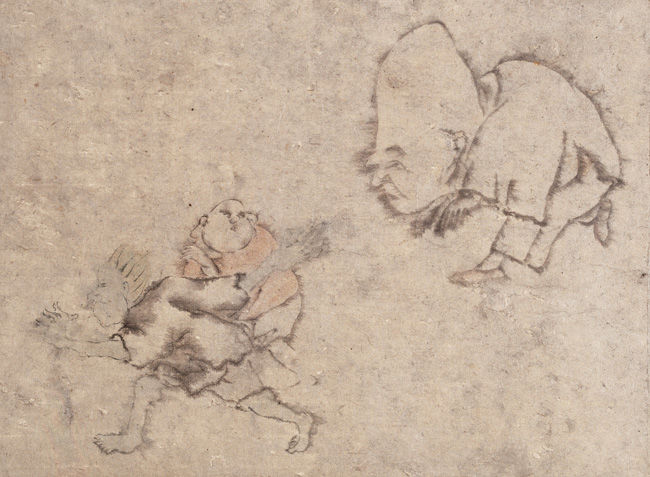
Creatures depicted in Luo Ping's Gui Qu Tu (鬼趣图; lit. 'Ghost Amusement Picture Scroll')

Yaoguai (Chinese: 妖怪; pinyin: yāoguài) represent a broad and diverse class of ambiguous creatures in Chinese folklore and mythology defined by the possession of supernatural powers and by having attributes that partake of the quality of the weird, the strange or the unnatural. They are especially associated with transformation and enchantment. They often dwell in remote areas or on the fringes of civilization where they produce all manner of unexplainable phenomena and mischief. They often have predatory or malevolent tendencies.

Yaoguai vary considerably from one another in appearance and powers, and depending on the particular individual or type, as being capable of shapeshifting, creating illusions, hypnosis, controlling minds, causing disease, clairvoyance, and draining the life force of mortals.

While yaoguai are not evil in the sense Western demons are, they are usually weird and dangerous, tending to exert a baleful influence on mankind. In more superstitious times, confusion and bewilderment, strange and unexplainable disease, eerie sights and strange sounds, and cases of unexplained murders and missing persons were attributed to them, hence the folk saying "extraordinary occurrences are due to the yao [guai]" (事出反常必有妖; shì yǒu fǎncháng bì yǒu yāo).

Yaoguai are popular staples of modern Chinese fiction, appearing in books, movies and comics. They have also begun to appear in video games.

== Distinction between yaoguai and other supernatural beings in Chinese folklore ==
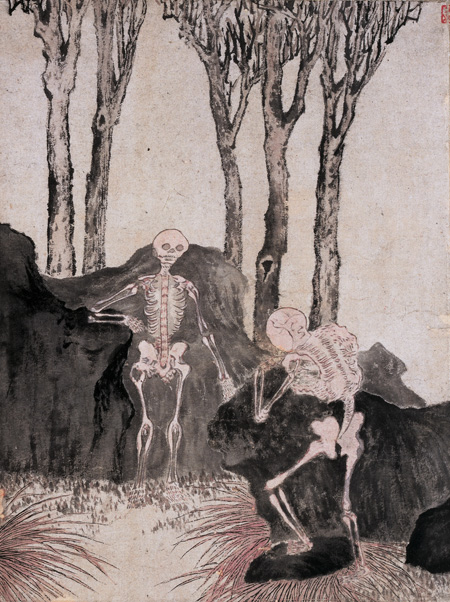
Ghostly skeletons depicted in the Gui Qu Tu

Gui, Guai, Yao, Mo and Xie

Chinese texts and beliefs abound with descriptions of the strange and supernatural, and do not always use consistent terminology. The word yao (妖) itself carries strong connotations of supernatural power, usually of the kind that runs contrary to the prescribed order of nature or heaven, and yaoshu (妖术; 妖術; yāoshù; 'yao technique') means sorcery.

In Chinese texts, specific yao (妖) are sometimes referred to as gui (鬼; "spectre or ghost"), guai (怪; "strange monster"), mo (魔; "demon, close to the Western sense") or xie (邪; "spiritually deviant or morally corrupt being"). Despite the overlapping connotations and senses and their somewhat interchangeable use, these words have different core meanings and commonly refer to creatures that are not yao (妖). The narrow sense of each word refers to different kinds of beings that can be distinguished, usually as follows:

- Gui (鬼) more properly refers to the spirits of the dead, although it can also refer to specters and daemons such as the yao (妖) generally.
- Guai (怪) means any strange event, object (animate or inanimate) or person ("奇异的事物或人") while guaiwu (怪物) means "strange thing" ("奇异的东西"). Monsters without supernatural powers, hence not yao (妖), may be also referred to as guai (怪) or guaiwu (怪物; guàiwù).
- Mo (魔) means demon in the religious sense - i.e. the sense that resembles devils and demons in the Western tradition. It also refers to fallen deities, immortals and even yao (妖) who have become extremely wicked.
- Xie (邪) carries the connotation of spiritual deviance, heterodoxy, or moral corruption and can even be used to refer to specific deities, as in xieshen (邪神), or corrupting devils (邪魔). Sometimes, used to described the yao (妖) in limited contexts.
- The phrase yao mo gui guai (妖魔鬼怪) means all varieties of supernatural and strange beings but can be used as a metaphor to refer to all kinds of bad people.

== Attributes, powers and origins ==
=== General attributes ===
A yāo (妖) is an eldritch and potentially predatory creature with uncanny properties, possessing supernatural powers such as shapeshifting. Dwelling in remote wildernesses or at the fringes of civilization, and occasionally intruding into human civilization. It tends towards malevolence and generally has a harmful influence on humankind. They can be of either gender, but femme fatales are prominent in the literature. In folklore, their characteristic attributes are strangeness or otherworldliness, seductiveness, and an association with erratic behavior, bewilderment, and with disaster or misfortune. Whatever could not be readily understood by the population and that frightened them was generally regarded as yāo (妖).

《孔丛子·执节》"若中山之谷，妖怪之事，非所谓天祥也"

If [while one is] in the midst of the mountain valleys, yaoguai [are found] acting, [then] this is not auspicious.

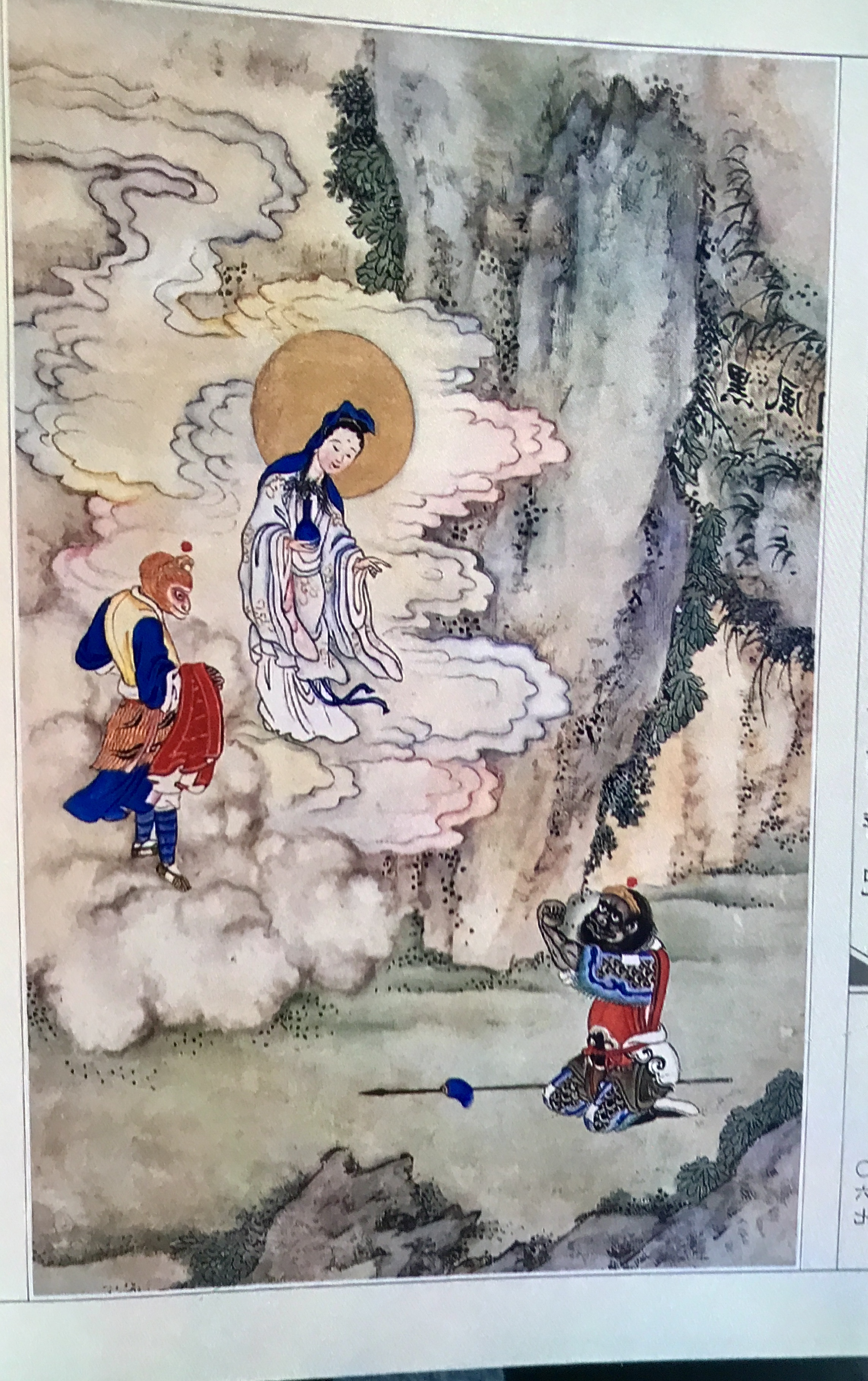
The surrender of Heifeng Guai, the Black Wind Demon, a yaoguai from Journey to the West

In their capricious tendencies and powers, they have some resemblance to the fae of Irish legend or the fairies of European lore. However, unlike the fae, the yāo (妖) often possess the nature of a specific kind of animal or a plant (a vixen, a snake, a butterfly, or a tree or a flower), which may have been their original form. They are capable of assuming human, or near-human form, and of wielding either innate supernatural powers or abilities associated with Taoist cultivation.

The existence of these creatures or phenomena associated with them is generally an ill-omen and is described arising due to natural fluctuations in yin and yang, or to human activity which disrupts the moral or normative order.

=== Typical powers ===
Possession of supernatural power defines the yaoguai, distinguishing them from other monsters. Descriptions of the abilities of these beings vary considerably. Typical powers ascribed to them include shapeshifting, the manufacture of illusions, mind control, clairvoyance, the possession of human beings, and the control over natural forces.

For example, nine-tailed foxes are said to be clairvoyant beings able to poison others through sorcery and to take possession of others. In Yue Jun's tale "Hu Hao Hao", a fox spirit compels, through sorcery, a respectable couple to engage in a sexual threesome with it. Baigujing, a white skeleton essence, is described as an adept shapeshifter, taking on the forms of multiple people in an attempt to deceive her opponents. Others are capable of control over elemental forces, as when Bai Suzhen, a white snake fairy unleashes a supernatural flood against a temple.

=== Origin ===
Older references to the yāo (妖) regard them as strange phenomena arising due to aberrations or anomalies in qi (the breath, energy or material force) pervading the natural world, or else from the passive absorption of universal energies of yin and yang over a long period of time. They may also have developed into their current state from engaging in the deliberate cultivation of supernatural power. Finally, they may also result due to disturbances to the moral and cosmic order.

=== Disturbances to the moral and cosmic order ===
According to the classic text Zuo Zhuan, "when people abandon constancy then this causes the yao to emerge" (人弃常则妖兴; 人棄常則妖興; rén qì cháng zé yāo xìng). In traditional Chinese thought, natural phenomena and human wellbeing and flourishing are correlated to moral conduct. The operative principle can be moral or natural - either Heavenly retribution or the philosophical concept of gan-ying or stimulus-response (also known as "sympathetic resonance"). The latter is a broad connective principle according to which "like-begets-like", as when kindness begets kindness, thorns grow where armies are located, and where the musical analogy of resonating strings is often used.

- Black Calamity, a kind of injurious wind and vapor demon or group of such demons whose presence indicated the displeasure of Heaven, a disturbance to the moral and social order, and the need for repentance.

=== Born from anomalous or aberrant qi or energy ===
Some yaoguai arise spontaneously in nature due to anomalous or aberrant qi or energy. Examples include:

- Chimei (魑魅), a type of malevolent wilderness demon of the mountains and forests, are said to be born from aberrant qi (breath or energy) (魑魅，山林异气所生，为人害; 魑魅，山林異氣所生，為人害; chīmèi, shānlín yìqì suǒ shēng, wèi rén hài)
- Wangliang (魍魎), wilderness demons associated with rocks and trees (木石之怪曰夔，魍魎)
- Wangxiang (罔象) are wilderness demons that are born of water (水之怪曰龍，罔象)

=== Absorptions of cosmic energy over a long time ===
In Wang Chong's 1st century text the Balanced Discussions, things such as animals, plants, and rocks are said to be endowed a human-like essence and capacities as a result of immense age (物之老者，其精为人).

- The Penghou tree demon, associated with the element wood and with camphor trees, is said to be formed over the course of long years in remote mountain forests, developing into a human-headed dog with no tail.
- Lady White Bone or Baigujing was once the exposed skeleton of a maiden who, having absorbed the energies of the sun and moon over a long time, transformed into a shape-shifting daemon.

=== Deliberate cultivation ===
Sources:

- Bai Suzhen was a serpent who through the cultivation of magical power, attained to human form.
- Huli Jing are said to acquire their powers through both deliberate practice and immense age. Daji was a thousand-year-old fox spirit.

== Classical types and examples ==
Yaoguai are often the antagonists in both the Shenmo (神魔; 'Gods and demons fiction') genre and the Zhiguai (志怪; 'Strange tales') genres of literature.

In more superstitious times, they were also frequently believed to the culprits of strange occurrences and mysterious accidents, unexplained deaths and other ghastly phenomena.

Classical types in Chinese mythology, literature, and folklore include:

The "Nine Tailed Fox", a kind of fox demon. Fox demons are described as having a large number of supernatural powers.

- Black Calamity (黑气): A roving black fog or vapor that inflicts injuries to persons and damage to property wherever it goes. A dog-like or serpentine being, or multiple such beings, can also be seen within the vapor. This demon or group of demons cannot be thwarted through normal weapons and ordinary means. Its presence indicates heaven's displeasure and necessitates the need for repentance on the part of the emperor and the governing bureaucracy.
- Fox Demons (狐妖): A recurring being in Chinese folk belief and literature. Said to be able to assume human form, and to have the supernatural ability to poison and inflict disease, to know things at a distance, to bewilder, and to derange. It is also able to take possession of human beings. In literature, it appears in Yue Jun's Hu Hao Hao, where it compels a couple to engage in a forbidden sex act, and as Daji in Fengshen Yanyi, where it leads the Shang king astray. The idea of a fox spirit appears to have been drawn in part from the activities of proscribed fox-spirit cults.
- Tiger Demons (虎妖): A recurring being in Chinese zhiguai (志怪) genre of literature, and also often blamed for actual missing persons cases in ancient China. Men were sometimes accused of being ravening tigers in human form and killed either by lynch mobs or being delivered up to magistrates to be put to death with state sanction. Sometimes these men had themselves confessed, likely under torture, to consuming other human beings.
- Wolf Demons (狼妖): Occurs sporadically in tales, but less frequently than fox spirits and tiger demons. Some Chinese writers supposed that the ancient Huns, Turks and Mongols were capable of transforming into wolves at leisure. A tale relates the discovery Wang Han from Taiyuan, whose father was Han Chinese and mother was a Hunnish woman adept at hunting. As his mother aged, she became unable to maintain her human form and eventually was discovered to be a wolf, escaping into the wilderness. Other tales relate of werewolves during a famine in the Ming dynasty.
- Snake Demons (蛇妖): Appears as an instrument of divine punishment but sometimes persecutes even the worthy. Occasionally appears as a seducer, shapeshifting into human form to gratify its lusts. Also said to be able to cause diseases, manifesting as horrific skin sores, through supernatural power.
- Penghou (彭侯): A murderous tree demon that develops over the course of long years, taking the form of a tailless dog with a human head. It can be found in deep mountain forests and will attempt to kill passing travelers. It is associated with the essence of the wood element and with camphor trees. Additionally, it can be killed, boiled and eaten.
- Chimei (魑魅): a kind of wilderness demon born of aberrant qi or strange energy in mountains and forests. It is malevolent and harmful to humans. Etymology suggests the ability to seduce or enthrall.
- Wangliang (魍魎): a kind of wilderness demon associated with rivers and marshes, or else with apparitions between rocks and trees, or else a brain-eating sprite, and alternatively a plague-causing being, sometimes appearing in the form of a three-year old child with long hair. It can waylay and kill unwary travelers.

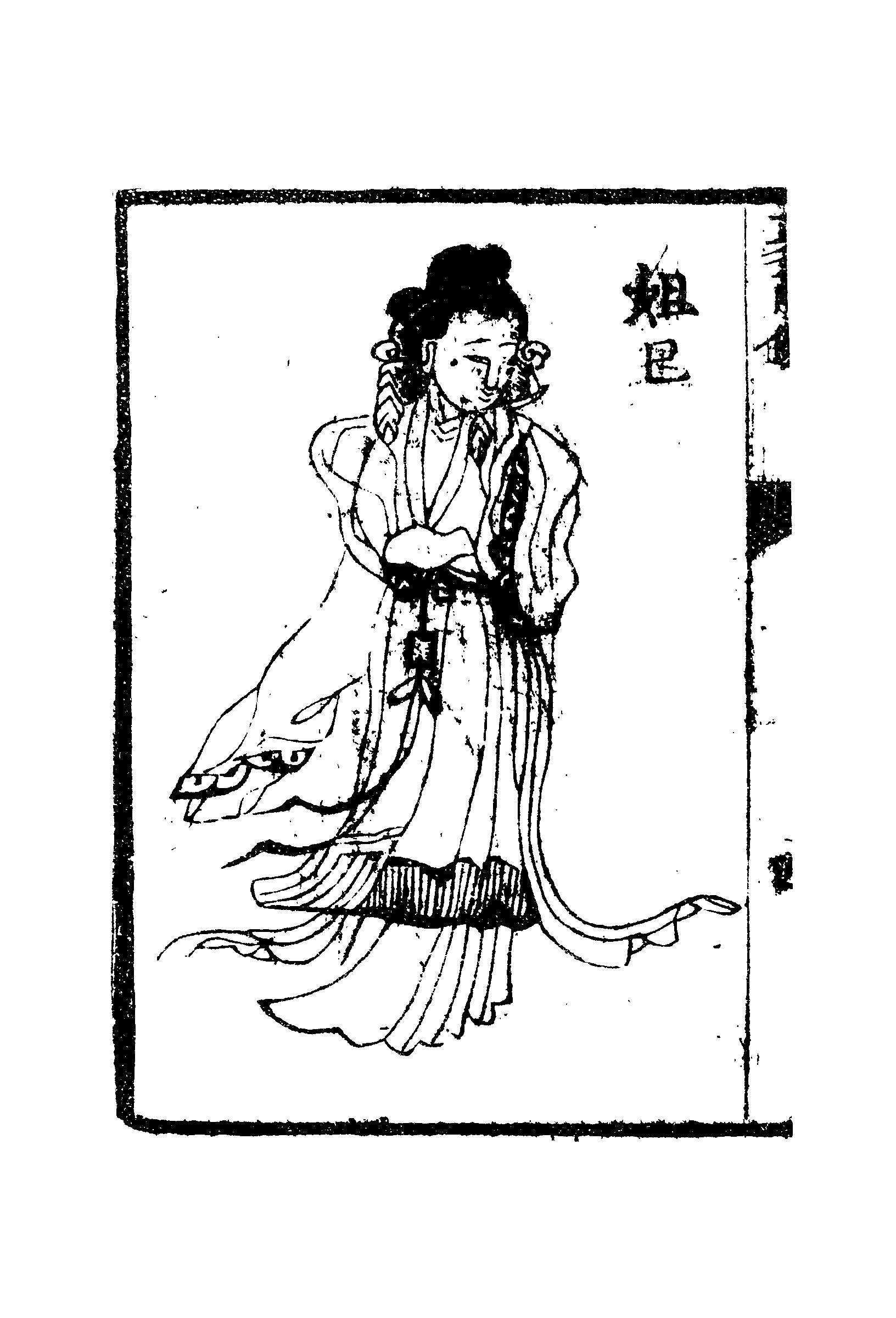
Daji, the fox demon in her human guise

Specific characters from literature and folklore include:

- Bai Suzhen: a snake demoness that had managed to cultivate a human form, and who falls in love with a man named Xu Xian. Their love is repudiated by a monk, and she is ultimately trapped and sealed beneath a pagoda.
- Hundred-Eyed Demon Lord: a demon in Journey to the West, whose true form is a centipede and whose eyes radiant brilliant light. He assumes the form of a Taoist priest and is attended to by seven spider demons.
- Sun Wukong, sometimes called a "stone monkey demon", who grows powerful enough to challenge the entire Taoist pantheon.
- Zhu Bajie, a heavenly general demoted to a pig monster and junior disciple of Sun Wukong in Journey to the West.
- Spider Demons: Seven sisters whose true form is that of a spider, and who are able to shoot webs from their navels. They assist the Hundred-Eyed Demon Lord in Journey to the West.
- Lady White Bones (colloquially "Baigujing"): a shapeshifting demoness whose true form is a white skeleton, and who desires to eat the flesh of a holy man in order to obtain immortality.
- Niumowang: literally, "bull demon king"
- Daji: the thousand-year-old "fox spirit" in Fengshen Yanyi who seduces the last king of Shang in order to precipitate the fall of his kingdom.
- Pipa Jing and Jiutou Zhiji Jing in Fengshen Yanyi, a magical pipa and a nine-headed pheasant who accompany Daji in her mission.
- "Painted skin demon", featured in the Pu Song Ling's The Painted Skin, a ghastly green ghoul with serrated teeth wearing a mask of human skin.

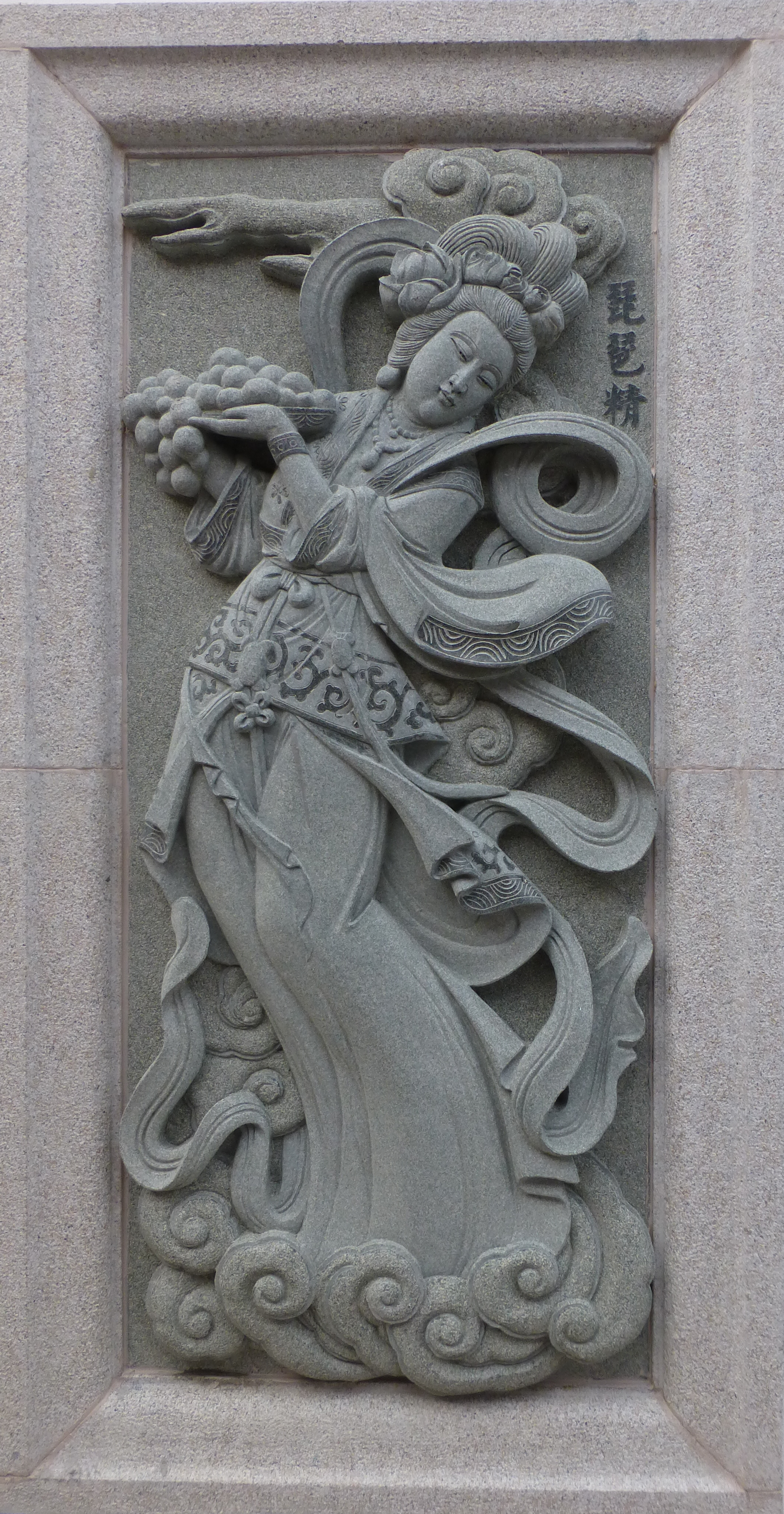
Pipa Jing, or the Pipa Fairy

=== Taoist folklore ===
In Taoist folklore, yaoguai come from "an imbalance in the" Tao and "any combination of [atypical] powers, including mind control, shapeshifting and the ability to create illusions."

== Typology ==
=== Shapeshifters causing supernatural afflictions ===
Folkloric belief and literature are replete with tales of shapeshifting "daemons" with the power to assume human form, to afflict with poison and disease, to bewilder, and to enthrall and seduce. The original form of these shapeshifters can vary widely, and include the fox, the tiger, the wolf, and the snake, amongst others. These creatures are often denominated by appending the character yāo (妖) to their essential nature or original form. Accordingly, a fox demon may be denominated a huyao (狐妖; húyāo), a tiger demon as huyao (虎妖; hǔyāo), so on and so forth.

=== Predatory beings ===
Yaoguai are often depicted as injurious or predatory beings in Chinese folklore and literature who seek to consume or to drain the life force of living beings. The purpose in consuming human beings is often to obtain immortality or achieve godlike power, but sometimes is attributed to simple hunger. They may also cohabit with human beings, either as a prelude to consuming them, or in order to satisfy their lust.

Many employ sexual seduction as a tactic. Some belong to the "femme fatale" category of antagonists - assuming the form of beautiful women. Others masquerade as Taoist priests and or Buddhist monks in order to gain the trust of their victims. One example is the tale of the Painted Skin "demon" from Pu Song Ling, a green-skinned demon who wears a mask of human skin. Another example is Baigujing, the white-skeleton spirit, who adopts various disguises an attempt to consume the flesh of a holy man to obtain immortality. The Hundred-Eyed Demon Lord is a centipede who assumes the form of an elderly Taoist priest.

Yet others, like the wangliang, the tiger demon, and the wolf demon, are simply opportunistic ambush predators who rely on stealth and speed in order to satisfy their insatiable hunger. The Wangliang is an apparition that appears in the mountains and marshes that accosts travelers and that has a taste for human brains, relying on its stealthiness and speed to successfully kill its prey. The wolf demon and tiger demon are ravening beings roaming over wide areas to consume large numbers of people, assuming human form to evade detection.

=== Creatures with spiritual cultivation ===
In Chinese folklore, supernatural power and immortality can be attained by ordinary mortals and even animals through personal cultivation, often Taoist in nature. This cultivation usually involves some kind of meditative, spiritual, or hygienic practices, the consumption of certain foods, the absorption of certain natural energies, and mental and physical exercises. Through long perseverance in such practices, animals, plants and even inorganic matter such as rocks and musical instruments may gain supernatural power, immense wisdom, or human form through years of cultivation. The acquisition of sentience and supernatural power is called chengjing (成精; chéngjīng). A few take their cultivation even further, achieving immortal xian (仙) status.

This category or type of Yao often appears in classic stories such as Journey to the West, Legend of the White Snake, Investiture of the Gods and Strange Stories from a Chinese Studio. It is also alluded to in the works of the secular and naturalistic philosopher Wang Chong, who denied the existence of an afterlife and of ghosts, but claimed objects could acquire strange powers due to immense age.

=== Demoted gods ===
In the Chinese classical novel Journey to the West, some gods were banished to the mortal world and became Yaoguai because they violated the laws of heaven. The most representative ones are Zhu Bajie and Sha Wujing. In addition, in Journey to the West, in the heavenly court, some immortals decide to privately descend on their own accord. Many of them are waiters and mounts around the gods, such as the Golden and Silver Horned Kings of the Taishang Laojun; the Yellow Robe Demon, which was originally Kui Mulang; Maitreya Bodhisattva's Yellow Brows Great King; Manjushri's Azure Lion and so on. These end up becoming yaoguai.

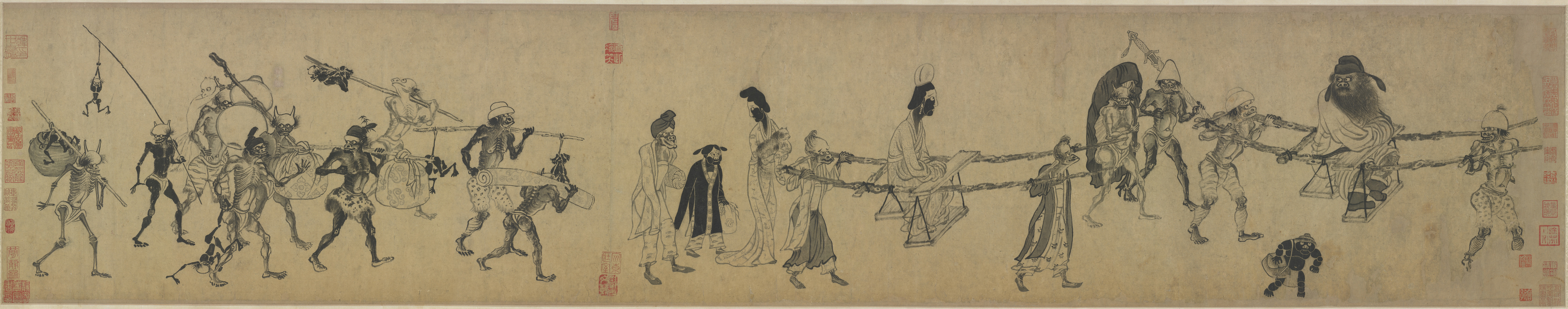
Gong Kai's Zhongshan Going on Excursion (13th or 14th century), depicting Zhong Kui with a retinue of subjugated demons

== Literature ==
=== Shenmo (lit. "gods and demons") genre of literature or mythic literature ===
Investiture of the Gods

In the literary text Investiture of the Gods, the fox-sprite Daji is sent on a mission by the goddess Nüwa, to corrupt the last king of the Shang and to instigate the fall of his dynasty, as punishment for the latter composing a ribald poem. She is accompanied and aided by two other yaoguai — Pipa Jing, a magical instrument who has taken on the form of a maiden, and Jiutou Zhiji Jing, a nine-headed pheasant who has also acquired human form.

Journey to the West

In Journey to the West, many yao seek immortality through the abduction and consumption of a holy man (in this case, Tang Sanzang). This includes a baigujing, who was originally the exposed white skeleton of a maiden that upon absorbing the energies of the sun and moon over a long course of time, transforms into a yaojing with shapeshifting powers.

Baigujing yearns to consume the flesh of a holy man in order to obtain immortality. Other yao were fallen pets or mounts of deities, who, having been expelled from heaven, proceed to make a nuisance of themselves on earth. The text also describes yaoguai kings (魔王; mówáng) that command a number of lesser demon minions.

Notably, Sun Wukong, the Monkey King, uses this term often to insult his adversaries. However, Wukong himself is also referred to as a demon not long after his birth by the narrator of Journey to the West and by his adversaries during his conflict with Heaven.

=== Zhiguai (lit. "strange tales") genre of literature ===
Yaoguai are the antagonists in a genre of literature known as zhiguai literature. Although they were produced principally for entertainment, it is worth noting that the appearance of anomalies in this genre literature is often associated with sociopolitical portents and a reflection of the current state of the cosmopolitical order, and that themes of dissatisfaction with the human condition resonate in the texts and lives of authors.

=== Hu Hao Hao (lit. "what the fox loves to indulge in") ===
Repressed sexuality is often a theme in such literature. In Yue Jun's collection "Hu Hao Hao", a couple is forced to engage in a threesome with a fox spirit against their will, and are powerless to resist the yaoguai. Yue Jun however, publicly disclaimed any didactic purpose in his writing, saying that these tales were not to be taken too seriously, implying they were written for the purposes of entertainment.

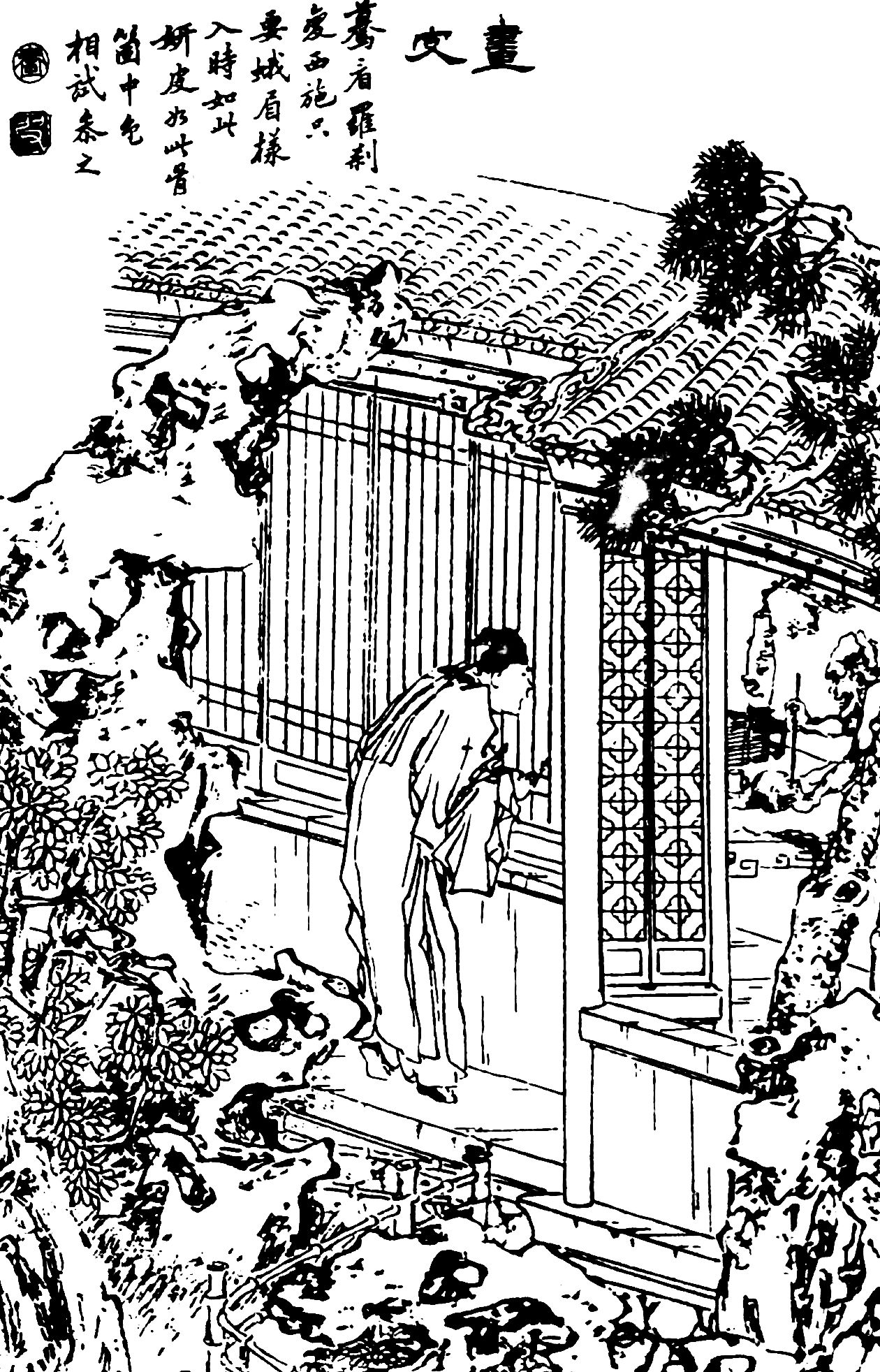
The Painted Skin, a tale from Pu SongLing, narrates a story of a yaoguai that collects and disguises itself in human skin

"Painted Skin"

Another theme is the ambivalent nature of beauty, which can mask great evil. This theme was the driving force behind Pu Song Ling's tale the "Painted Skin", as the author himself noted in a postscript:

How foolish men are, to see nothing but beauty in what is clearly evil! And how benighted to dismiss as absurd what is clearly well-intended! It is folly such as this that obliges the lady Chen to steel herself to eat another man's phlegm, when her husband has fallen prey to lust. Heaven's Way has its inexorable justice, but some mortals remain foolish and never see the light!

== Etymology and disambiguation ==
=== Etymology ===
Yaoguai (妖怪) is a compound word consisting of two Chinese characters often translated as monster, fiend, bogeyman, or demon.

Analyzing the compound word into the two separate words:

- yāo (妖) is a word which can mean eldritch, seductive, or sinister and beguiling, or a being with such characteristics, or strange, weird and supernatural.
- guài (怪) means strange or unusual when used as an adjective, and any monster or strange and unusual creature as a standalone noun.

While both of the words yāo (妖) and guài (怪) signify and connote strangeness, but yāo (妖) carries the additional connotation of seduction or supernatural enthrallment, whereas guài (怪) signifies a strange monster.

Terms like yāoguǐ (妖鬼; "strange ghost"), yāomó (妖魔; "daemon"), yāojīng (妖精; "often translated as "sprite" or "faerie"), and yāopó (妖婆; "hag" or "witch") are either types of Yaoguai (妖怪) or related beings.

The Japanese term yokai is simply the Japanese transliteration or pronunciation of the yāoguài (妖怪), and involves similarly strange creatures.

==== Classical usages ====
Classical usages of yao (妖) refer to preternatural phenomena and freakish occurrences where explanation fell outside the limited understanding of observers. These include:

- freakish vegetation (草妖; cǎoyāo),
- eerie sounds (鼓妖; gǔyāo),
- the unnatural onset of fog and darkness (夜妖; yèyāo),
- a sudden loss in verbal fluency or inability to express oneself (诗妖; 詩妖; shīyāo)
- sudden outbreaks of confused and erratic action, or transgressive behaviour (胡作非为; 胡作非為; hú zuò fēi wèi)

There is also a classical saying: "when affairs go awry, there must have been a yāo [acting]" (事出反常必有妖; shì yǒu fǎncháng bì yǒu yāo).

==== Later usages ====
In later terminology, yāo refers to natural objects (animals, plants or rocks) which have acquired sentience (lit. spiritual awareness), the ability to assume human or near-human forms, supernatural or magical powers, as well as the ability to cultivate so as to achieve immortality or transcendence.

=== Disambiguation ===
The terms yao (妖), gui (鬼), mo (魔) and guai (怪) are sometimes used interchangeably in the same text for the same creature, since these tales focus on producing entertaining or thrilling narratives rather than linguistic precision. This is true even though the creature satisfies the classical definition of a yao (妖).

However, in the strict sense, yao (妖) are usually seen as distinct creatures from "ghosts and spectres" (鬼; gui; "demons and devils" (魔; mo; "monsters and aberrations" 怪; guai). The differences may be thus explained:

Narrowly speaking, gui (鬼) are the spirits of the deceased, whereas mo (魔) are either demons in the religious sense, or fallen immortals that have succumbed to evil or who have elected to take a forbidden path for whatever reason. Meanwhile, guai (怪) on a standalone basis maintains a broad original meaning and can refer to any strange creature.

Ultimately, the yaoguai (妖怪) are not demons in the religious or the traditional western sense; they are neither archfiends nor fallen angels, neither the inveterate foes of mankind's salvation nor are they hardened rebels against the divine principle. They are often capable of sympathy, love, repentance, and even remorse, and of forming families with human beings. Instead, the word mo (魔) is used to refer to demons when translating Buddhist, Christian or other religious texts.

== Psychological underpinnings ==
In the folkloric tradition, their existence derives partly from the general fear of the unknown or the unknowable. General anxiety over social and political undercurrents, as well as psychological escapism may have provided the impetus for the literary tradition. The popular imagining of the yaoguai may also have received further stimulus from the activities of suppressed fox-spirit cults and other heterodox religious sects in China, from which their association with sorcery derives, as well as from the beliefs of minority tribes.

== Comparison to Japanese yokai ==
Japanese yokai is the Japanese transliteration or pronunciation of the Chinese term yaoguai and involves similarly strange creatures, with both languages using the same Chinese characters to describe them.

== Comparison to Western demons ==
A popular translation for them in Western texts is simply "demon", but this label can be very misleading; demons in the religious sense are termed mo (魔) rather than yao (妖). Other translations include "fiend", "monster", "goblin", "evil spirit" or "bogeyman". These creatures blur the boundaries between the natural and the unnatural, the human and the non-human, and their appearance in tales is often related to political portents or as a reflection of the social and cosmopolitical order.

Yaoguai is often translated as "demon" in English, but unlike the European concept of demons, a term heavily laden with moral and theological implications, the yaoguai are simply a category of creatures with supernatural (or preternatural) abilities and may be amoral rather than immoral, capricious rather than inherently wicked. As described in literature, many of them are capable of falling in love with mortals, repenting, and of exhibiting the full range of human emotions, desires and values.

== In popular culture ==
Yaoguai feature liberally in modern popular culture, including cinema and comic books of the xianxia genre.

=== Modern adaptations in Chinese cinema and culture ===
- In the 1987 HK film entitled A Chinese Ghost Story, a yaoguai in the form of a "tree demon" was the main antagonist. The "tree demon" was able to command the spirits of the dead to do its bidding, and one of the ghosts falls in love and saves the main protagonist, Nie Huaiqing.
- In the 1990 HK film entitled A Chinese Ghost Story II, a yaoguai in the form of a "centipede demon" with magical powers masquerades as a Buddhist monk to consume the essence of the ministers of the royal court.
- In the 2017 movie Wish Upon, a yaoguai is the spirit of the music box, which grants seven wishes but kills someone close to the owner every time a wish is granted. If the seventh wish is granted, the yaoguai will claim the soul of the owner.
- Yaojing and yaoguai appear in popular TV series produced in China, such as Love and Redemption, Ten Miles of Peach Blossoms, and Ashes of Love. Aside from the typical fox spirits who appear in these creatures, other examples of yao include animals, plants, and inanimate objects. All three of these series are based on Chinese e-novels in the Chinese Fantasy genre. In this genre, various types of yao are distinguished by whether they have celestial or demonic spiritual roots, but characters with either root may be good, evil, or neutral.
  - In any case, the creatures called yao in the story will basically not be tolerated by human society or the world governed by gods. It is already unwritten that they are arrested, sanctioned, eradicated, or forced into society by humans or gods.
- The video game Amazing Cultivation Simulator contains 12 different races of yaoguai that the player may choose to be members of their colony.
- The Taiwanese black metal band Chthonic has a drummer who wears a metal mask of a black demon mouth.
- The video game Black Myth: Wukong rooted in Journey to the West shows a wide variety of yaoguai inspired by Chinese traditional mythology.

Japanese adaptations

- The yaoguai's yaomo alias was used in AdventureQuest Worlds during its 2014 Akiba's New Year celebration on Yokai Island. It is depicted as a horned half-demon half-horse creature (with its build being similar to a centaur) with additional eyes on its chest and parts of the horse body. It was responsible for corrupting Akiba's Jingshen Forest causing the qilin Senlin-Ma (who was the guardian of the Jingshen Forest) to enlist the player for help. The players were able to defeat the Yaomo.

=== Western adaptations ===
- The post-apocalyptic role-playing video game series Fallout features mutated American black bears identified as yaoguai. These creatures roam many parts of post-War America, appearing in Fallout 3, the Fallout: New Vegas DLC Honest Hearts, Fallout 4, and Fallout 76. They attack both the player and various non-player characters. In Fallout 3, one of the in-game radio stations broadcasts an occasional public service announcement reminding listeners "don't feed the Yao Guai". In Fallout lore, the Yao Guai were named by descendants of pre-War Chinese internment camp prisoners.
- In the "Dark Aether" ("Zombies") storyline of the video game Call of Duty: Black Ops Cold War, the QBZ-83 assault rifle can be upgraded ("pack-a-punched"), giving the gun the name "yaoguai".
- In the DLC "Nightmare in North Point" of the video game Sleeping Dogs, players fight demonic creatures called "Yaoguai".
- The American fantasy television series Once Upon a Time featured a creature called a yaoguai in the second-season episode "The Outsider". Here, it was depicted as a large lion-like creature with a mane of fire. Maleficent transformed Prince Phillip into a Yaoguai until it was undone by Belle.
- An episode of the television series Sleepy Hollow features the yaoguai as a demon who is attracted to aggression and gunpowder from a gun.
- The mobile game Gems of War features a legendary troop called Yao Guai.
- The 2017 supernatural horror Wish Upon features a Chinese demon called a Yaoguai.
- In the 2023 TV series American Born Chinese, based on the 2006 graphic novel, the main antagonist is Niu Mowang.

== See also ==
=== Broader entries ===
- List of supernatural beings in Chinese folklore
- Shanhaijing (lit. "Classic of Mountain and Seas") – classical Chinese bestiary
- Soushenji (lit. "In Search of the Supernatural") – classical Chinese compendium
- Shenmo (gods and demons) fiction – a subgenre of Chinese fantasy literature
- Zhiguai ("records of the strange") fiction – a genre of Chinese literature
- Zibuyu (lit. "What the Master Would Not Discuss") – collection of eyewitness and folk accounts in history of uncanny or strange phenomena

=== Creature-specific entries ===
- Demon – evil supernatural being, sometimes used to translate yaoguai
- Faeries – legendary creature in European folklore, similar to the yaoguai
- Fox spirit – a shapeshifting yaoguai able to assume human form
- Ghosts in Chinese culture
- Huli jing – Chinese mythological creatures
- Jiangshi – Chinese vampire or zombie
- Mara – the origin of the Chinese term "mo" (魔) or demon in the religious sense
- Penghou – a malevolent tree spirit in the form of a dog with a human head capable of killing passers-by in deep mountain valleys. Usually associated with camphor trees.
- Wangliang – wilderness demons in Chinese mythology and folklore
- Wekufe – Spirit or demon in Mapuche mythology
- Xian – transcendent beings who have cultivated immortality and have supernatural powers
- Yōsei – Spiritlike creature from Japanese folklore
- Yōkai – Supernatural beings from Japanese folklore
