= The Tale of the Judge of Tản Viên Temple =

Vietnamese folktale

- Short story by Nguyễn Dữ
- Original title: Tản Viên từ phán sự lục
- Country: Vietnam
- Language: Sino-Vietnamese
- Genres: Chuanqi, historical fantasy

Publication
- Published in: Truyền kỳ mạn lục
- Publication date: 16th century

Chronology
The Record of the Wrongdoing of Đào Thị	The Tale of Từ Thức Marrying a Goddess

The Tale of the Judge of Tản Viên Temple (chữ Hán: 傘圓祠判事錄, Tản Viên từ phán sự lục) is a Vietnamese legend told in Truyền kỳ mạn lục by Nguyễn Dữ in the 16th century.

== In Truyền kỳ mạn lục ==
The Tale of the Judge of Tản Viên Temple is the eighth story of Nguyễn Dữ's Truyền kỳ mạn lục collection, published in the second volume.

Ngô Tử Văn is an upright and vehement man who lives in Yên Dũng, Lạng Giang. In the Ming invasion, a Chinese general was killed and his spirit took over a temple in the region, tormenting the local people since. This angers Tử Văn, so he burns down the temple.

Later, Tử Văn falls ill and a man wearing a helmet appears, demanding him to rebuild the temple or be sued in the underworld. Ignored by Tử Văn, the man leaves. Another man appears and congratulates Tử Văn for his deed. The old man introduces himself as a former official of Lý Nam Đế and now a Soil God, and says that the other man is the evil spirit of a Chinese general who has occupied his temple, forcing him to take shelter at Tản Viên Temple. Claiming that the spirit has bribed nearby local gods to cover his misdeeds, he advises Tử Văn to prepare for his impending arrest.

At night, two demon soldiers arrest and escort Tử Văn to a giant and towering palace next to a river full of demons. Tử Văn pleads for his innocence, so he is taken in to meet Yama, the Lord of Death. The helmet-wearing man is the plaintiff. Tử Văn reports what the Soil God has told him. Yama sends men to Tản Viên Temple to take witness account, confirming Tử Văn's report. The Lord of Death sentences the spirit to the nine levels of hell, and sends Tử Văn back to his body.

A month later, the old man visits Tử Văn and informs him that Tản Viên Temple is in need of a judge and that he has recommended Tử Văn for the position. Tử Văn gladly accepts and passes away. In 1414, an acquaintance of Tử Văn sees him riding a carriage in the mist outside of Đông Quan.

== Education ==
The story is a lesson included in the second volume of Vietnam's national textbook for Grade 10 students.
