= The Record of the Wrongdoing of Đào Thị =

Vietnamese folktale

- Short story by Nguyễn Dữ
- Original title: Đào Thị nghiệp oan ký
- Country: Vietnam
- Language: Sino-Vietnamese
- Genres: Chuanqi, historical fantasy

Publication
- Published in: Truyền kỳ mạn lục
- Publication date: 16th century

Chronology
The Tale of the Lawsuit in Dragon Court	The Tale of the Judge of Tản Viên Temple

The Record of the Wrongdoing of Đào Thị (chữ Hán: 陶氏業冤記, Đào Thị nghiệp oan ký ) is a Vietnamese legend told in Truyền kỳ mạn lục by Nguyễn Dữ in the 16th century. It follows the story of Đào Thị, a talented woman who commits various misdeeds in her life.

== In Truyền kỳ mạn lục ==
The Record of the Wrongdoing of Đào Thị is the seventh story of Nguyễn Dữ's Truyền kỳ mạn lục collection, published in the second volume.

Đào Thị is a famous artiste in the Trần dynasty who is recruited as a palace servant in 1345. Thanks for her literary genius, the king grants her the name Hàn Than. After the king's death, she is discharged from the palace. Hàn Than soon gets into an affair with mandarin Ngụy Nhược Chân, but his jealous wife beats her up. Hàn Than hires an assassin to get revenge on Nhược Chân's family, but the assassin is caught, forcing her to flee and take shelter at Phật Tích Temple. However, her past life is exposed there and she has to flee again.

Hàn Than seeks refuge at Lệ Kỳ Pagoda in Hải Dương County, which is headed by grandmaster Pháp Vân and monk Vô Kỷ. Because of her licentiousness, Pháp Vân advises Vô Kỷ not to welcome her in, but he refuses to listen, so Pháp Vân moves out to the top of Phượng Hoàng Mountain. Hàn Than and Vô Kỷ quickly fall in love with each other, spending most of time to write poetry while neglecting their religious duties. In 1349, Hàn Than is pregnant, falls sick and soon passes away. Her ghost appears in front of a devastated Vô Kỷ and asks him to join her in the afterlife, so she can use his power to pay off an old grudge. Vô Kỷ soon dies as well.

On a stormy night, the wife of Ngụy Nhược Chân dreams of beings bitten by two snakes, and she soon gives birth to two children, Long Thúc and Long Quý. Years later, a monk appears and warns Nhược Chân of a curse in his house. Nhược Chân also hears Long Thúc and Long Quý secretly discuss that only Pháp Vân could exorcise them. The mandarin looks everywhere for Pháp Vân and eventually finds him on Phượng Hoàng Mountain. Although initially refusing, the grandmaster eventually agrees to help. Pháp Vân casts a spell on a stone and gives it to Nhược Chân, tells him to throw it at whatever the demons transform into. When Nhược Chân returns, he hears that the children have committed suicide by jumping into a well. Their corpses have turned into two yellow snakes, which crumble into ashes when hit by the stone. Nhược Chân tries to go back and repay Pháp Vân, but the grandmaster has disappeared.

== Historical accuracy ==
In the story, Trần Dụ Tông was said to die between 1345 and 1349. However, the king actually died in 1369.
