= The Tale of the Abandoned Pagoda in Đông Triều =

Vietnamese folktale

- Short story by Nguyễn Dữ
- Original title: Đông Triều phế tự lục
- Country: Vietnam
- Language: Sino-Vietnamese
- Genres: Chuanqi, historical fantasy

Publication
- Published in: Truyền kỳ mạn lục
- Publication date: 16th century

Chronology
The Tale of the Conversation with a Woodcutter at Na Mountain	The Story of Thúy Tiêu

The Tale of the Abandoned Pagoda in Đông Triều (chữ Hán: 東潮廢寺傳, Đông Triều phế tự lục) is a Vietnamese legend told in Truyền kỳ mạn lục by Nguyễn Dữ in the 16th century.

== In Truyền kỳ mạn lục ==
The Tale of the Abandoned Pagoda in Đông Triều is the thirteenth story of Nguyễn Dữ's Truyền kỳ mạn lục collection, published in the third volume.

In the Trần dynasty, Buddhism overgrows. Pagodas are built everywhere while nearly half of the population become monks, especially in Đông Triều District, where followers and worshipers are very devoted. However, by the times of Giản Định Đế, the country has been engulfed in the flames of war, and most pagodas are abandoned. After the war, people return to their home to rebuild, and Văn Tư Lập is appointed the head official of Đông Triều.

After a year, thefts happen regularly, but Văn Tư Lập could not stop them. As the cases become more severe, Tư Lập realizes that the thieves are not mortals, but demons. He invites many exorcists to repel the demons to no avail. The mandarin then hears that a wiseman in Kim Thành District is good at divination, so he comes to seek his advice. The wiseman tells him to go to the South from the district's left gate next morning, and look for a horseman wearing duffel cloth and carrying a leather bag. After a whole day of searching, Tư Lập finally sees such man emerging from the mountain. Although the man says he is a mere hunter, the mandarin insists to bring him back to his office. The man is treated like a god, but he feels guilty, so he sneaks out and runs away at night.

On the run, he sees three figures gathering by a lake to catch and eat fish. Two of them complain of the vegetarian offerings they used to have, while the other one lamenting the lack of offerings to him lately. They plan to go to the sugarcane field to steal, but the man uses his bow to shoot and hit two of them, forcing the gang to flee. The man and villagers trace the wounded ones to an abandoned pagoda, where they see two crooked Dharmapala statues, each stuck with an arrow. The villagers topple the statues, which lament the betrayal of the sea god, so they come to the sea god's temple and destroy the statue there as well. The mandarin rewards the man handsomely, and no demonic activities have occurred since then.
