= The Tale of Từ Thức Marrying a Goddess =

Vietnamese folktale

The Folktale of Từ Thức Cave

Folk tale
- Name: The Folktale of Từ Thức Cave
- Country: Vietnam
- Published in: Kho tàng truyện cổ tích Việt Nam by Nguyễn Đổng Chi

"The Tale of Từ Thức Marrying a Goddess"
- Short story by Nguyễn Dữ
- Original title: Từ Thức tiên hôn lục
- Country: Vietnam
- Language: Sino-Vietnamese
- Genres: Chuanqi, historical fantasy

Publication
- Published in: Truyền kỳ mạn lục
- Publication date: 16th century

Chronology
The Tale of the Judge of Tản Viên Temple	The Tale of Phạm Tử Hư Visiting Heaven

The Tale of Từ Thức Marrying a Goddess (chữ Hán: 徐式仙婚錄, Từ Thức tiên hôn lục) or Từ Thức Meeting Gods (Vietnamese: Từ Thức gặp tiên) is a Vietnamese legend told in Truyền kỳ mạn lục by Nguyễn Dữ in the 16th century and based on the Folktale of Từ Thức Cave (Vietnamese: sự tích động Từ Thức). It follows the life of Từ Thức in the Trần dynasty who meets and marries a goddess in the godly realm before leaving his wife to revisit his hometown, unaware that countless ages have passed in the mortal world since then.

== The folktale of Từ Thức cave ==
According to folklore, Từ Thức cave in Tam Điệp mountain range, in Nga Thiện Commune, Nga Sơn District, Thanh Hóa is said to be the cave where Từ Thức went to the godly realm. The folktale is the 130th story in Kho tàng truyện cổ tích Việt Nam (lit. 'Vietnam's collection of folktales') of Vietnamese folklorist Nguyễn Đổng Chi.

Từ Thức cave nowadays is a national relic site recognized in 1992.

== In Truyền kỳ mạn lục ==
The best-known variation of the story, the Tale of Từ Thức Marrying a Goddess is the ninth story of Nguyễn Dữ's Truyền kỳ mạn lục collection, published in the second volume.

In the era of Quang Thái in the Trần dynasty, Từ Thức is the head official of Du Tiên District in Hóa Châu Province. In a neighboring district, there is a famous pagoda with a peony tree that attracts many visitors whenever it blooms. One day, a girl accidentally breaks one branch of the tree, and Từ Thức helps her pay for it. As a carefree man who loves drinking and sightseeing, he often neglects his duty and eventually resigns to travel the country. One day, he enters a cave and arrives at a godly realm called Phù Lai Mountain. A goddess appears and marries him to her daughter Giáng Hương, who was the girl Từ Thức helped before. After spending a year in the godly realm, he begins to miss his home, so he asks his wife to let him go back to say goodbye to his relatives and friends. His wife hesitantly has a cloud car transport him back to the mortal world and gives him a letter. Upon arrival, Từ Thức discovers that eighty years have passed and it is the era of Diên Ninh in the Lê dynasty now. The cloud car turns into a bird and flies away, while his wife's letter turns out to be a farewell. Now homeless and without the means to return to the godly realm, Từ Thức wanders into Hoàng Sơn mountain and disappears.

== Other variations ==
A shorter variation of the story, simply named "Từ Thức", was told in Nam Hải dị nhân liệt truyện (lit. 'Biographies of strange people in the Southern Sea') by Phan Kế Bính in 1909.

The story of Từ Thức is also told in various forms of Vietnamese literature, including the Nôm poem "Từ Thức tân truyện" by an unnamed author, "Từ Thức tiên hôn" by Lê Khắc Khuyến and as a chèo play, which is one of seven ancient chèo plays that still exists.

== Adaptations ==
Từ Thức's tale is adapted by scriptwriters Quy Sắc and Mộng Long into a cải lương play called Từ Thức Lên Tiên (lit. 'Từ Thức Ascending to Godly Realm'). The play introduces a new character name Yến Nhi or Ý Nhi, who is the fiancée of Từ Thức before he marries Giáng Hương and is still alive as a very old woman when he returns after a hundred years. The play starred Minh Phụng, Tài Linh and Thanh Thanh Tâm as Từ Thức, Giang Hương and Ý Nhi, respectively. Ho Chi Minh City Television later produced a new version featuring Vũ Linh, Hồ Ngọc Trinh and Cao Thúy Vy.

"Từ Thức cave" in Nguyễn Đổng Chi's collection is adapted into an episode of Cổ tích Việt Nam, a television series of theatricalized fairy tales and legends produced by Vĩnh Long Television in 2016. The episode was directed by Nguyễn Khoa Nam and starred Hiếu Nguyễn as Từ Thức.

== In popular culture ==
=== In folk poetry ===
Từ Thức is mentioned in "Em trèo đèo, em lặn suối" (lit. 'I wander up hill and down dale'), a folk poem collected in Kho tàng ca dao người Việt (lit. 'Collection of Vietnamese folk songs') by Nguyễn Xuân Kính and Phan Đăng Nhật.

The character is also focused on in the following six-eight folk poem:

Trách chàng Từ Thức vụng suy,
Cõi tiên chẳng ở, về chi cõi trần.

Literal translation:

What a miscalculation Từ Thức made,
Instead of staying in the godly realm, why would [he] come back to the mortal realm[?]

=== In literature ===
In front of Từ Thức cave, there are two poems carved into rock, both focuses on the legend of Từ Thức. One is "Đề Từ Thức động" (lit. 'For Từ Thức cave'), written by Lê Quý Đôn. The poem was carved at the cave later, in 1905. The other one is "Ngự chế đề Từ Thức động" (lit. 'Imperially made for Từ Thức cave'), which was written by Trịnh Sâm in 1771.

Từ Thức is also mentioned in "Bích Câu kỳ ngộ" (lit. 'Strange encounter in Bích Câu'), an epic poem written by an unnamed author and collected in Đoàn Thị Điểm's Truyền kỳ tân phả.

== See also ==
- Liu Chen and Ruan Zhao - characters in a similar Chinese legend.
- Urashima Taro - a similar Japanese folktale
