= Chimimōryō =

Mythological creatures

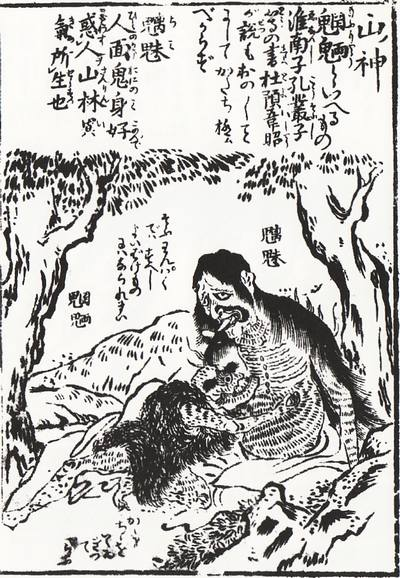
"Hyakki Yakōka Monogatari" by Edo Iseya Jisuke. The one to the right (from the viewer's perspective) is the chimi, and to the left is the mōryō.

Chimei wangliang, or Chimimōryō (Chinese: 魑魅魍魉; pinyin: Chīmèi wǎngliǎng; Japanese: 魑魅魍魎 [ちみもうりょう]; rōmaji: chimimōryō), is a term that refers to monsters of the mountains and monsters of the rivers. The term originated in China roughly 2,500 years ago in ancient chronicles such as the Zuo Zhuan. It originates from ancient Chinese legends about the spirits that harm people in the mountains and swamps, and its original meaning is "all kinds of Yaoguai (demons and ghosts)".

== Explanation ==
=== Chimei ===
Chimei (魑魅; Chimi in Japanese) is also called Kui. Born from the strange atmosphere of the mountains and forests, they are spirits transformed from wood and stone. Characterized by a human face and an animal body with four legs, it is very charming.

=== Wangliang ===
Wangliang (魍魎; mōryō in Japanese) are considered to be spirits from mountains and rivers, and trees and rocks. They emerge from the life energy of mountains, water, trees, rocks, and all natural things, and fool humans. They are also said to eat the dead, have the appearance of a child, stand on two feet, have dark red skin, have red eyes, long ears, beautiful hair, and a voice that resembles that of a human. With this kind of appearance, in Japan they are thought to be oni. In the Wakan Sansai Zue, they are considered water gods (Suijin), and in the ancient Chinese book Zuo Zhuan, they are considered to be gods of swamps and marshes.

In Japanese folklore

In the Japanese dictionary Wamyō Ruijushō from the Heian period, they were considered to be a type of oni under the Japanese name "sudama", and in the Edo period encyclopedia, the Wakan Sansai Zue, they were seen to be mountain gods (Yama-no-Kami).

==== Vietnamese literature ====
In the text, Truyền kỳ mạn lục (傳奇漫錄), the word si mị võng lượng (chữ Hán: 魑魅魍魎) is a general term to refer to all different kinds of demons and monsters. Here is a line from The Story of the Cotton Tree (Mộc miên thụ truyện; 木棉樹傳) in the original Literary Chinese text and the giải âm translation:

嗚呼！魑魅魍魎、雖自古不以爲天下患，然匹夫多欲、庸或犯之。

Ô hô! Si mị võng lượng, tuy tự cổ bất dĩ vi thiên hạ hoạn, nhiên thất phu đa dục, dung hoặc phạm chi.

唉喂！神魑魅神魍魎、雖自𠁀𠸗天下拯𥙩𫜵𠰷，双几閑𡗉𢚸欲、恒或犯帝。

Hỡi ôi! Thần si mị thần võng lượng, tuy từ đời xưa thiên hạ chẳng lấy làm lo, song kẻ hèn nhiều lòng dục, hằng hoặc phạm đấy.

Alas! As for the demons and spirits, though from ancient times they have never been a calamity worth fearing for humankind, however the common man, being filled with lots of desires, often falls prey to them.

== Etymology ==
There are many theories about its etymology. According to the Chinese Records of the Grand Historian (during the period of the Five Emperors), a 魑 is a mountain god that took on the shape of a tiger, and a 魅 is a swamp or marsh god taking on a shape with the head of a beast. It is surmised that from this that the word was seen to mean expanded to encompass beasts of various attributes.

== See also ==
- Hyakki Yagyō
- Mononoke
- Oni
- Tsukumogami
- Yaoguai
- Yōkai
