= The Tale of Phạm Tử Hư Visiting Heaven =

Vietnamese folktale

- Short story by Nguyễn Dữ
- Original title: Phạm Tử Hư du thiên tào lục
- Country: Vietnam
- Language: Sino-Vietnamese
- Genres: Chuanqi, historical fantasy

Publication
- Published in: Truyền kỳ mạn lục
- Publication date: 16th century

Chronology
The Tale of Từ Thức Marrying a Goddess	The Tale of the Demon in Xương Giang

The Tale of Phạm Tử Hư Visiting Heaven (chữ Hán: 范子虛遊天曹錄, Phạm Tử Hư du thiên tào lục) is a Vietnamese legend told in Truyền kỳ mạn lục by Nguyễn Dữ in the 16th century.

== In Truyền kỳ mạn lục ==
The Tale of Phạm Tử Hư Visiting Heaven is the tenth story of Nguyễn Dữ's Truyền kỳ mạn lục collection, published in the second volume.

Phạm Tử Hư is a man in Cẩm Giàng. Originally prideful and uninhibited, Tử Hư is reformed by his teacher Dương Trạm into a better person. After Dương Trạm passes away, he is the only one who stays by his grave and mourns for 3 years before going home. After failing the imperial examinations many times, a 40-year-old Tử Hư moves to the capital and stays by the West Lake to study. One day, he sees his teacher in the cloud, telling him to meet at Trấn Vũ Temple. At the reunion, Dương Trạm says that he was nominated by the Magnate to godhood because he was faithful and treasured written papers when he was alive. Although he does not know how long Tử Hư can live, he informs him that his attainment of the imperial exam is guaranteed, although it is delayed because of his past arrogance. Tử Hư and Dương Trạm discuss about the current corrupt officials, with the teacher claiming that karma is inevitable and wrongdoers will have to pay eventually. Tử Hư asks if the practice of praying at the Magnate's Temple works, but Dương Trạm laughs it off and says that the Magnate is too busy to respond to their prayers. Tử Hư then asks if the rumored deification is true, which Dương Trạm confirms.

Tử Hư asks if he can take a look at heaven and Dương Trạm agrees. He is taken to heaven and sees the White Jade Capital, the Silver River and the Imperial Palace where the Supreme Deity rules. Among the places Tử Hư visit are the Meritorious Gate where those who lived a generous and charitable life are rewarded, the Virtuous Gate where those who lived in harmony with each other dwell, and the Confucian Gate where renowned scholars like Tô Hiến Thành of Lý dynasty and Chu Văn An of Trần dynasty are honored. After they part, Từ Hử passes the exam next year and gets a doctorate. His teacher often visits him to warn him of upcoming events.
