= The Tale of the Conversation with a Woodcutter at Na Mountain =

Vietnamese folktale

- Short story by Nguyễn Dữ
- Original title: Na sơn tiều đối lục
- Country: Vietnam
- Language: Sino-Vietnamese
- Genres: Chuanqi, historical fantasy

Publication
- Published in: Truyền kỳ mạn lục
- Publication date: 16th century

Chronology
The Tale of the Demon in Xương Giang	The Tale of the Abandoned Pagoda in Đông Triều

The Tale of the Conversation with a Woodcutter at Na Mountain (chữ Hán: 那山樵對錄, Na sơn tiều đối lục) is a Vietnamese legend told in Truyền kỳ mạn lục by Nguyễn Dữ in the 16th century.

== In Truyền kỳ mạn lục ==
The Tale of the Conversation with a Woodcutter at Na Mountain is the twelfth story of Nguyễn Dữ's Truyền kỳ mạn lục collection, published in the third volume.

Na is a mountain in Thanh Hóa, with a long, narrow and craggy cave going through it. Every day, an old woodcutter exists the cave and exchanges firewood for fish and wine, without taking money or revealing his identity. In the era of Khai Đại of the Hồ dynasty, Hồ Hán Thương on a hunting trip sees the woodcutter. The king sends his retainer Trương Công after the man. Trương follows the woodcutter into the cave, and after walking for miles, arrives at a small house. The old man is surprised to see the retainer. Trương informs him that the king wants to see him, but the woodcutter answers that he is just a hermit living in seclusion knowing nothing of the world outside. The old man lets him have dinner and spend the night there. Next morning, Trương tries to convince the hermit again, but he rejects. The retainer cites the surrender of Champa, the defeat of the Ming, the submission of Lan Xang and Dali as achievements of the new king. Upset by his bragging, the hermit tells him that he has heard about all the infamies of the Hồ family, including their overuse of people labor to build Kim Âu Palace, the overspending of national treasury for the Jasmine Citadel, the degradation in the government, the revolt in Đáy River, the loss of Cổ Lâu land, the corruption and shortcoming of most government officials other than a few talented yet flawed individuals. As the old man's mind could not be changed, Trương comes out and reports to the king. The king orders him to go back in again, but the cave has been obstructed and the old way could not be found. A two-verse poem is written on the wall predicting the eventual outcomes of the Hồ family, but nobody could understand it. Hán Thương is angry and orders the mountain to be burned down, but nothing appears other than a black crane flying in the sky.

== Other accounts ==
A short version of the legend is included in Đại Nam nhất thống chí published by the Nguyễn dynasty in 1882, in the section about Nưa/Na Mountain in Thanh Hóa.

== Legacy ==
=== Shrine ===
The woodcutter is attributed to Trần Tu Viên, also known as Hoàng My Tiên Sinh, an official in the Trần dynasty who withdrew into seclusion when the government declined. The burned house of the woodcutter has been rebuilt into a shrine called Khe Đông Đốt in Nưa Mountain.
