= The Tale of the Yaksha General =

Vietnamese folktale

- Short story by Nguyễn Dữ
- Original title: Dạ Xoa bộ soái lục
- Country: Vietnam
- Language: Sino-Vietnamese
- Genres: Chuanqi, historical fantasy

Publication
- Published in: Truyền kỳ mạn lục
- Publication date: 16th century

Chronology
The Record of the Poetry Talk in Kim Hoa	—

The Tale of the Yaksha General (chữ Hán: 夜叉部帥錄, Dạ Xoa bộ soái lục) is a Vietnamese legend told in Truyền kỳ mạn lục by Nguyễn Dữ in the 16th century. It mythifies and fictionalizes the lives of Văn Dĩ Thành and Lê Ngộ, the leaders of a Vietnamese resistance during the Fourth Era of Northern Domination.

== Origin ==
During the Ming domination of Vietnam, Văn Dĩ Thành (born 1380) gathered a resistance movement in Tổng Gối to fight the Ming occupiers, with Lê Ngộ as his deputy general. Because his army worn black clothes, they were called the Black-Clothed Army. He was famous for the "Six Precious Commandments" and the "Four Hopes for the Land" that he wrote and made his army follow. After some initial victories, Văn Dĩ Thành was cornered and killed by the Ming on March 12, 1416.

Nowadays, he is deified by villages in the region as their guardian god, and Văn Sơn Tomb is said to be his grave.

== In Truyền kỳ mạn lục ==
The Tale of the Yaksha General is the twentieth and final story of Nguyễn Dữ's Truyền kỳ mạn lục collection, published in the fourth volume.

Văn Dĩ Thành is a fearless man from Quốc Oai County. At the end of Trùng Quang Đế reign, people die en masse and their spirits become hordes of wandering demons running amuck. Dĩ Thành comes to see and convinces them to repent. The demons are grateful and ask him to become their leader, to which he accepts. He makes the demons vow to obey and not to harm innocent humans. One day, a messenger from the Underworld appears and informs Dĩ Thành that Yama wants to appoint him the general of a Yaksha division. Although he is initially hesitant, the demons convinces him to accept the offer, so he agrees and passes away.

Lê Ngộ is a close friend of Dĩ Thành in the village. One day, he is visited by Dĩ Thành, who is now an official in the Underworld. As they have a drink together, Lê Ngộ complains why he is still poor although he has lived a good life. Dĩ Thành explains that destiny is outside of humans' control, but it is more important to stay upright even in poverty. He warns Lê Ngô of an upcoming period of turmoil, with wars and famines, and that he should go back to his hometown. He then tells him a way to avoid the calamity. When Lê Ngộ returns to his hometown, his family falls sick. At night, he prepares a big feast in the yard. When a horde of demons led by a purple-robed man comes and eats it, he appears and keeps kowtowing to them. Although the purple-robed man is unmoved, the fellow demons convince him to spare the human, so he removes Lê Ngộ's name from his book and his family recovers. Lê Ngộ then builds a shrine to venerate Dĩ Thành.
