= The Tale of the Demon in Xương Giang =

Vietnamese folktale

- Short story by Nguyễn Dữ
- Original title: Xương Giang yêu quái lục
- Country: Vietnam
- Language: Sino-Vietnamese
- Genres: Chuanqi, historical fantasy

Publication
- Published in: Truyền kỳ mạn lục
- Publication date: 16th century

Chronology
The Tale of Phạm Tử Hư Visiting Heaven	The Tale of the Conversation with a Woodcutter at Na Mountain

The Tale of the Demon in Xương Giang (chữ Hán: 昌江妖怪錄, Xương Giang yêu quái lục) is a Vietnamese legend told in Truyền kỳ mạn lục by Nguyễn Dữ in the 16th century.

== In Truyền kỳ mạn lục ==
The Tale of the Demon in Xương Giang is the eleventh story of Nguyễn Dữ's Truyền kỳ mạn lục collection, published in the third volume.

Thị Nghi is the daughter of Hồ Kỳ Vọng in Phong Châu at the end of Hồ dynasty. When her father dies, she is sold to Phạm, a rich tradesman in Xương Giang. When she grows up, she has an affair with Phạm, so his wife beats her to death and buries her next to a village. Her ghost becomes a demon and haunts the villagers, so they dig up her grave and throw it into a river.

In the Lê dynasty, a mandarin from Lạng Giang named Hoàng is traveling to the capital to take office. He sees a girl crying on the shore, who says that her parents have been slain by bandits. Trying to flirt with her, the mandarin helps retrieving her parents' remains and has them buried in Bạch Hạc. The girl then offers herself to Hoàng, to which he agrees. A month after Hoàng takes office, he falls ill and becomes insane, refusing any drugs or talismans given to him. Healers and shamans suspect his illness an act of demons, but they could do nothing. A ragged man appears and talks in a ridiculous manner, which amuses Hoàng, so he accepts his medicine. The girl is angry at the man, but he throws a talisman at her, turning her into a skeleton. The man explains that the she was the origin of the curse. When her grave is dug up, there is nothing but some pieces of blood, which quickly disappear. The man warns that the calamity on Hoàng is not over.

After a week, Hoàng is arrested by two soldiers, who bring him to a giant palace. He realizes that the girl is suing him to Yama, so he writes a poem to the Lord of Death to tell him what happened. Yama is angry at the girl and sentences her to hell, but also reduces Hoàng's longevity by 12 years for his indecency, before sending him back home. A few years later, Hoàng goes to Tam Giang and stops by Phong Châu Temple, but he realizes that it is the same palace he saw before, so he runs away. It is the second year of the era of Thiệu Bình.
