= The Story of the Woman in Nam Xương =

Vietnamese folktale

- Short story by Nguyễn Dữ
- Original title: Chuyện người con gái Nam Xương
- Country: Vietnam
- Language: Sino-Vietnamese
- Genres: Chuanqi, historical fantasy

Publication
- Published in: Truyền kỳ mạn lục
- Publication date: 16th century

Chronology
The Record of the Night Party in Đà Giang	The Story of Lý General

The Story of the Woman in Nam Xương (chữ Hán: 南昌女子傳, Chuyện người con gái Nam Xương) is a Vietnamese legend told in Truyền kỳ mạn lục by Nguyễn Dữ in the 16th century. The work is based on a folk tale about the injustice faced by a young woman during the late Trần dynasty.

== In Truyền kỳ mạn lục ==
The Story of the Woman in Nam Xương is the sixteenth story of Nguyễn Dữ's Truyền kỳ mạn lục collection, published in the fourth volume.

Vũ Thị Thiết is an honest woman from Nam Xương. Her husband Trương Sinh is from a wealthy family, and has a jealous personality. Due to being uneducated, Trương Sinh can only join the army to make a living, leaving his elderly mother and Thiết at home. Thiết gives birth to their first child Đản, and takes care of both the child and her mother-in-law. Some time later, her mother-in-law becomes sick due to missing Trương Sinh, and later passed away. Vũ takes care of the funeral and the offerings as if it is the funeral of her own biological parents.

In order to relieve her anxiety about her husband's safety, and avoid the problems Đản might have with the absence of his father, Thiết often joked with Đản by pointing to her shadow on the wall and telling him that the shadow is Đản's father. After the war ended, Trương Sinh returned and heard the news about his mother's death. Trương Sinh takes Đản, who recently learnt to speak, to visit his mother's grave. On the way, Đản cries and says: "Trương Sinh is not Đản's father. Đản's father comes every night. Đản's mother also goes. Đản's mother also sits but never carries Đản." Due to his jealous nature, Trương Sinh scolded Thiết very harshly and chased her away, despite clarifications from the neighbors. Unable to explain herself, Thiết attempted suicide by jumping into the Hoàng Giang River. She was saved by Linh Phi, the wife of the King of the Southern Sea.

One night, Trương Sinh sits sadly under a lamp, when his son Đản points at his shadow and calls it father. Trương Sinh realized that he misunderstood his wife, but it is too late to correct the mistake. A person named Phan Lang, who is from the same village as Thiết, has a dream where a woman in blue clothing asking for her life. The next day when someone comes to visit with a green shell turtle, Phan Lang takes it and releases it to the wild. At this time, the Ming–Đại Ngu War breaks out, and the local population are trying to flee as the Ming army advances to the Chi Lăng Pass. Phan Lang takes refuge in a ship, but later experienced a shipwreck and drowned. His body drifted into a turtle cave, where he is resurrected by Linh Phi, who is also the green shell turtle Phan Lang saved earlier. Phan Lang meets Thiết, who asks Phan Lang that when he return to the human world, he should remind Trương Sinh to set up an altar at Hoang Giang wharf to exonerate himself.

Sinh establishes the altar, and sees Thiết sitting on a palanquin in the middle of the stream, with flags and parasols resplendent across the entire river. She thanks Sinh and makes farewell to him, as she can no longer return to the human world.

== Đền Vũ Temple ==
Đền Vũ Temple in Chân Lý commune, Lý Nhân district, Hà Nam province is dedicated to the worship of Vũ Thị Thiết. According to the local tradition, the temple was constructed in the 15th century, initially built on a beach along the Red River with bamboo leaves and thatch. Later, due to the concern of flooding, a decree from King Lê Thánh Tông ordered the temple to relocate to the current position and be rebuilt into a larger and proper temple.
