= Pipa Jing =

Fictional character from Investiture of the Gods

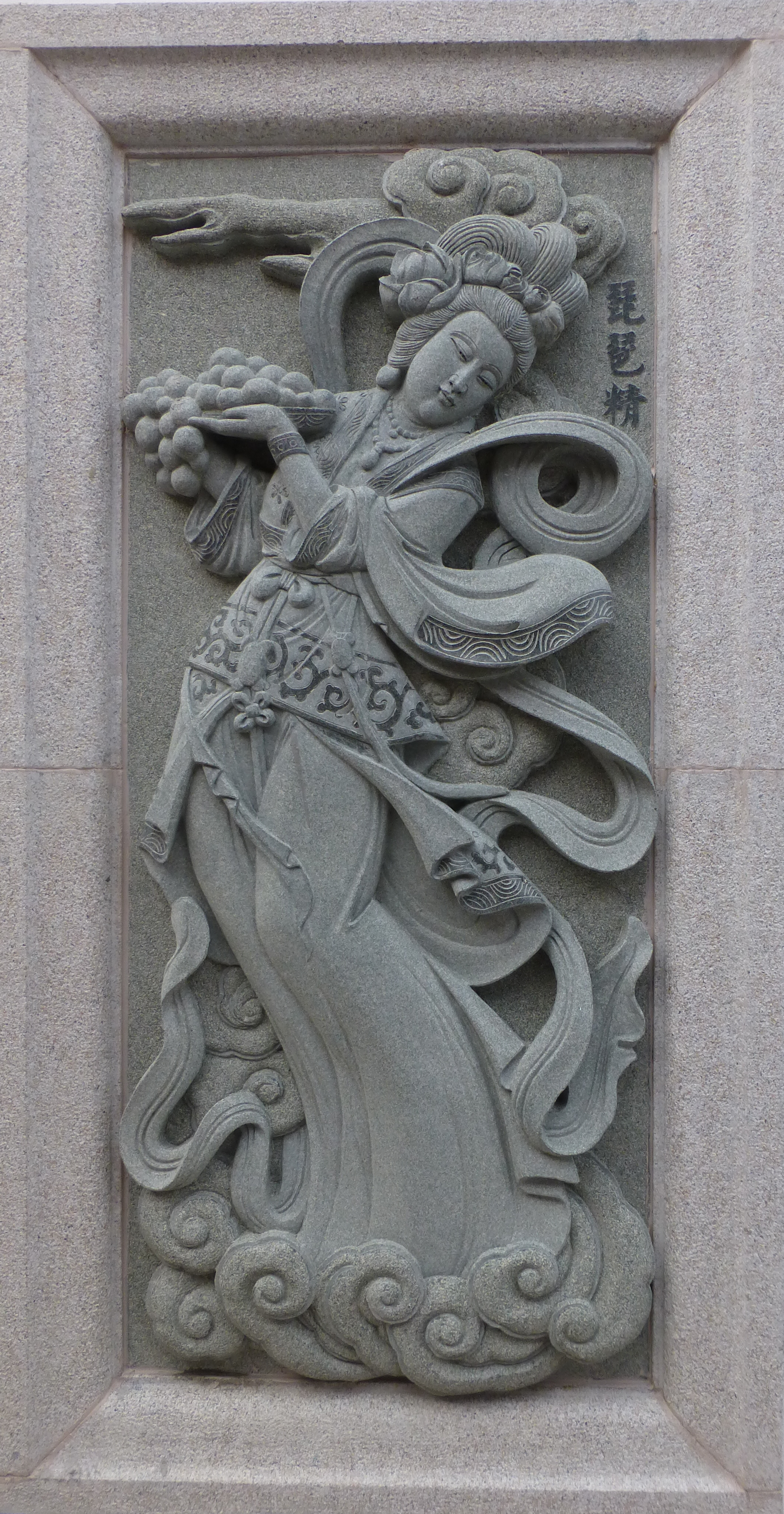
Relief of Pipa Jing Spirit

Pipa Jing (Chinese: 琵琶精; pinyin: Pípa Jīng), or Wang Guiren (Chinese: 王貴人; pinyin: Wáng Guìrén), is a character featured within the classic Chinese novel Fengshen Yanyi (Investiture of the Gods). She is a yaojing (seductive spirit) transformed from a jade pipa after thousands of years of cultivation. She later becomes a favored concubine of Di Xin.

== In Fengshen Yanyi ==
Pipa Jing is one of the three renowned female spectres under the legendary Nüwa, the celestial sovereign. They were summoned by Nüwa to destroy King Zhou. In return, Nüwa promised them immortality after their mission was finished. One time, when Pipa Jing returned from a visit with her friend Daji (a malevolent fox spirit), she happens to find Jiang Ziya with a large crowd of people around the fortune telling studio. Thus, Pipa Jing turns herself into a very attractive young woman and approaches Jiang for a fortune divination.

Unfortunately for Pipa Jing, Jiang sees that she is truly an evil spectre in disguise. Jiang continues the palm reading, but once he held Pipa Jing's palm, he became more forceful and refused to let go. Pipa Jing screamed and asked for help from the people around her, leading Jiang to smack her over the head with an ink stone – which kills her mortal body. Jiang never lets go of Pipa Jing's palm so that the true spectre cannot escape. Soon enough, Pipa Jing is set in a large amount of firewood and set alight after varied jujus were put in place to prevent her true self from escaping. Once everyone realized that even her hair never burns or even catches fire, Pipa Jing ends up being burned to death once Jiang unleashes a triple divine fire combined with shattering lightning. Five years after her death, Pipa Jing is finally revived once again after her friend Daji gathers the essence of both the moon and the sun. In the end, the three demons attempted to assassinate King Wu in a bid to prolong the Shang Dynasty's prosperity. However, they were pursued and hunted down by Yang Jian, Leizhenzi, and Wei Hu. Nüwa captured and restrained the demons, who were then brought back to the Zhou camp for execution. Wei Hu supervised the beheading, and their severed heads were displayed as a warning to others, hanging atop flagpoles for all to see. Their names were not included on the Investiture of the Gods list.
