= The Story of the Cotton Tree =

Vietnamese folktale

- Short story by Nguyễn Dữ
- Original title: Mộc miên thụ truyện
- Country: Vietnam
- Language: Sino-Vietnamese
- Genres: Chuanqi, historical fantasy

Publication
- Published in: Truyền kỳ mạn lục
- Publication date: 16th century

Chronology
The Story of the Virtuous Wife in Khoái Châu	The Tale of the Tea Boy Reincarnated

The Story of the Cotton Tree (chữ Hán: 木棉樹傳, Mộc miên thụ truyện) is a Vietnamese legend told in Truyền kỳ mạn lục by Nguyễn Dữ in the 16th century.

== In Truyền kỳ mạn lục ==
The Story of the Cotton Tree is the third story of Nguyễn Dữ's Truyền kỳ mạn lục collection, published in the first volume.

Trình Trung Ngộ is a handsome and rich tradesman from Bắc Hà coming to Nam Xang Market to do business. One night, he makes acquaintance to a strange girl named Nhị Khanh, the granddaughter of a noble in the Eastern village. She has lost her parents and is abandoned by her husband, forcing her to live outside the village's boundary. Seeking to live her life to the fullest, she and Trung Ngộ make out all night on a boat, with her writing two poems to commemorate the encounter. Nhị Khanh leaves in the morning, although they continue to see each other every night for over a month.

Trung Ngộ's trade partners advise him to wrap up their relationship, so he asks her to take him to her house. Although hesitant, Nhị Khanh agrees and brings him to a raggedy hut next to the village. When Trung Ngộ enters, he smells something foul and sees the coffin of Nhị Khanh. Although the girl tries to stop him, a shocked Trung Ngộ manages to escape. He later learns that Nhị Khanh has been dead for half a year, and he falls sick. As the ghost continues to approach him, he tries to follow her but is stopped by his friends who tie him up. One day, Trung Ngộ escapes and is found dead next to Nhị Khanh's coffin. Their ghosts haunt and wreak havoc in the village, so the villagers dig their graves up and throw into a river.

The ghosts then haunt an ancient cotton tree in a pagoda next to the river. Years later, in 1330, a priest visits the pagoda and sees the naked ghosts playing around. He decides to exorcise them by having the villagers set up an altar, where he casts a spell. The sky momentarily turns dark before the tree gets uprooted and torn apart. People see two ghosts arrested and taken away by hundreds of buffalo-headed soldiers. They try to reward the priest, but he leaves without taking anything.

== Origin ==
Like many other stories in Truyền kỳ mạn lục, The Story of the Cotton Tree is loosely inspired by Jiandeng Xinhua of Qu You, but with strong and distinctive Vietnamese settings. More specifically, this story is distinctly similar to The Record of the Peony Table Lamp in the second volume of Qu You's collection. However, Associate Professor Ph.D Nguyễn Đăng Na argued that any similarities between the two works are common elements and natural developments in folklorism around the world, although he does not deny the influence of Jiandeng Xinhua on the Chuanqi works in the East Asian cultural sphere.
