= Lingbi County =

Lingbi 灵璧县 Lingpi
- County
- Interactive map of Lingbi
- Coordinates: 33°40′43″N 117°32′21″E
- Country: People's Republic of China
- Province: Anhui
- Prefecture-level city: Suzhou

Area
  - County: 2,054 km^{2} (793 sq mi)

Population (2020)
  - County: 974,720
  - Urban: 354,086
  - Rural: 620,634
- Time zone: UTC+8 (China Standard)
- Postal code: 234200

Lingbi County (simplified Chinese: 灵璧县; traditional Chinese: 靈璧縣; pinyin: Língbì Xiàn) is a county in northern Anhui Province, China, bordering Jiangsu province to the north and northeast, and is under the administration of the city of Suzhou.

In 2020, the population was 974,720, of which 36.33% lived in urban areas.

== Administrative divisions ==
Lingbi County is currently divided into 13 towns and 6 townships.

13 Towns

- Lingcheng (灵城镇)
- Weiji (韦集镇)
- Huangwan (黄湾镇)
- Louzhuang (娄庄镇)
- Yinji (尹集镇)
- Youji (尤集镇)
- Yangtuan (杨疃镇)
- Xialou (夏楼镇)
- Chaoyang (朝阳镇)
- Yugou (渔沟镇)
- Gaolou (高楼镇)
- Fengmiao (冯庙镇)
- Huigou (浍沟镇)

6 Townships

- Xiangyang (向阳乡)
- Zhuji (朱集乡)
- Dalu (大路乡)
- Damiao (大庙乡)
- Chantang (禅堂乡)
- Yuji (虞姬乡)

== Climate ==
Climate data for Lingbi, elevation 23 m (75 ft), (1991–2020 normals, extremes 1981–present)
Month	Jan	Feb	Mar	Apr	May	Jun	Jul	Aug	Sep	Oct	Nov	Dec	Year
Record high °C (°F)	19.7 (67.5)	26.5 (79.7)	33.3 (91.9)	33.0 (91.4)	37.2 (99.0)	39.6 (103.3)	41.0 (105.8)	38.4 (101.1)	37.1 (98.8)	35.2 (95.4)	29.0 (84.2)	21.8 (71.2)	41.0 (105.8)
Mean daily maximum °C (°F)	6.1 (43.0)	9.3 (48.7)	14.6 (58.3)	21.0 (69.8)	26.4 (79.5)	30.7 (87.3)	32.0 (89.6)	30.9 (87.6)	27.4 (81.3)	22.4 (72.3)	15.1 (59.2)	8.4 (47.1)	20.4 (68.6)
Daily mean °C (°F)	0.9 (33.6)	3.8 (38.8)	8.8 (47.8)	15.1 (59.2)	20.6 (69.1)	25.2 (77.4)	27.6 (81.7)	26.5 (79.7)	22.1 (71.8)	16.5 (61.7)	9.5 (49.1)	3.0 (37.4)	15.0 (58.9)
Mean daily minimum °C (°F)	−3.1 (26.4)	−0.6 (30.9)	3.8 (38.8)	9.5 (49.1)	15.1 (59.2)	20.2 (68.4)	24.0 (75.2)	23.2 (73.8)	18.0 (64.4)	11.8 (53.2)	5.0 (41.0)	−1.1 (30.0)	10.5 (50.9)
Record low °C (°F)	−16.2 (2.8)	−16.5 (2.3)	−7.9 (17.8)	−1.2 (29.8)	5.6 (42.1)	11.2 (52.2)	17.4 (63.3)	14.1 (57.4)	7.5 (45.5)	−0.5 (31.1)	−8.5 (16.7)	−21.3 (−6.3)	−21.3 (−6.3)
Average precipitation mm (inches)	23.6 (0.93)	27.5 (1.08)	44.8 (1.76)	49.5 (1.95)	66.4 (2.61)	141.2 (5.56)	214.2 (8.43)	164.1 (6.46)	89.2 (3.51)	49.7 (1.96)	38.4 (1.51)	19.5 (0.77)	928.1 (36.53)
Average precipitation days (≥ 0.1 mm)	5.3	6.5	7.1	7.1	8.0	8.8	12.8	11.6	8.8	6.0	6.7	5.1	93.8
Average snowy days	3.5	2.9	1.3	0.1	0	0	0	0	0	0	0.7	1.4	9.9
Average relative humidity (%)	69	69	68	70	71	70	81	84	80	72	72	70	73
Mean monthly sunshine hours	135.2	137.4	175.8	201.5	211.6	187.7	190.3	185.4	170.9	174.8	148.5	142.3	2,061.4
Percentage possible sunshine	43	44	47	51	49	44	44	45	46	50	48	46	46
Source: China Meteorological Administration
