= Wangliang =

Mythical Chinese malevolent spirit

Chinese name
- Traditional Chinese: 魍魎
- Simplified Chinese: 魍魉
Transcriptions
Standard Mandarin
- Hanyu Pinyin: wǎngliǎng
- Wade–Giles: wang-liang
Middle Chinese
- Middle Chinese: mjangXljangX
Old Chinese
- Baxter–Sagart (2014): maŋʔp.raŋʔ

Korean name
- Hangul: 망량
Transcriptions
- Revised Romanization: mangnyang
- McCune–Reischauer: mangnyang

Japanese name
- Kanji: 魍魎
- Hiragana: もうりょう
Transcriptions
- Revised Hepburn: mōryō

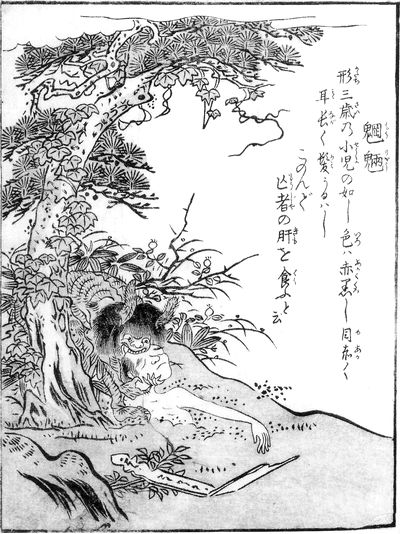
Japanese illustration of a Wangliang or Mōryō 魍魎 eating a corpse's brain, Toriyama Sekien's (c. 1779) Konjaku Gazu Zoku Hyakki

In Chinese folklore, a wangliang (Chinese: 魍魎; pinyin: wǎngliǎng or Chinese: 罔兩) is a type of malevolent spirit. (Note: In modern Chinese, wangliang has a general set of meanings, potentially including 'demon', 'monster', 'specter' and 'goblin', but it originally referred to a specific demon.) Interpretations of the wangliang include a wilderness spirit, similar to the kui, a water spirit akin to the Chinese dragon, a fever demon like the yu (魊; "a poisonous three-legged turtle"), a graveyard ghost also called wangxiang (罔象) or fangliang (方良), and a man-eating demon described as resembling a 3-year-old child with brown skin, red eyes, long ears, and beautiful hair.

== Name ==
In modern Chinese usage, wangliang is usually written 魍魎 with radical-phonetic characters, combining the "ghost radical" 鬼 (typically used to write words concerning ghosts, demons, etc.) with the phonetic elements wang (罔) and liang (兩)) (lit. "deceive" and "two", respectively). In Warring States period (475–221 BC) usage, wangliang was also phonetically transcribed using the character pronunciations wang (罔) and liang (兩), and written as 蝄蜽 with the "animal radical" 虫 (used to write names of insects, dragons, etc.) or wangliang (罔閬)) using liang (閬); "dry moat") with the "gate radical" 門 (typically used in architectural terminology). The earliest recorded usages of wangliang in the Chinese classics are: 魍魎 in the (c. 5th–4th century BC) Guoyu (罔兩) in the (c. 389 BCE) Zuozhuan (罔閬) in the (c. 91 BC) Shiji, and 蝄蜽 in the (121 AD) Shuowen jiezi (or possibly the Kongzi Jiayu of uncertain date).

While liang (魎) only occurs as a bound morpheme in wangliang, wang appears in other expressions, such as wangmei (魍魅; "evil spirits"). Wǎngliǎng ("demons and monsters") frequently occurs in the synonym-compound chīmèiwǎngliǎng (魑魅魍魎; "demons; monsters"). Since commentators differentiate between chimei ("demons of the mountains and forests") and wangliang ("demons of the rivers and marshes"), chimeiwangliang can mean either "demons; monsters; evil spirits" in general or "mountain demons and water demons" separately. For example, James Legge's Zuozhuan translation syllabically splits chimeiwangliang into four types of demons: "the injurious things, and the hill-sprites, monstrous things, and water-sprites".

Chinese scholars have identified wangxiang (罔象) and fangliang (方良) as probable synonyms of wangliang < Old Chinese *maŋʔp.raŋʔ 魍魎 (citing Baxter and Sagart's 2014 reconstructions). Wangxiang < *maŋʔs.[d]aŋʔ 罔象 means "water demon," and the reverse xiangwang < *s.[d]aŋʔmaŋʔ 象罔 means "a water ghost" in the Zhuangzi (which uses wangliang < *maŋʔp.raŋʔ 罔兩 for the allegorical character Penumbra, see below). The Guoyu distinguishes wangliang (罔兩) as "a tree and rock demon" and wangxiang (罔象) as "a water demon" (see below). Fangliang < *paŋ[r]aŋ 方良 names a "graveyard demon," identified as the wangliang < *maŋʔp.raŋʔ 罔兩, that is exorcized in the Zhouli (below).

A simple explanation for these phonological data and the evolving identifications of demon names is that they were dialectical variations or corruptions of each other. William G. Boltz offers a more sophisticated interpretation: these were not merely confusions between similar, but independent, names, but actually all variants of one and the same underlying designation: an initial consonantal cluster **BLjang ~ **BZjang, meaning "see". Citing Bernhard Karlgren's reconstructions of Old Chinese, Boltz presents mjwang-ljang 罔兩 < **BLjang, pjwang-ljang 方良 < **Ljang, and mjwang-dzjang 罔象 < **BZjang. Furthermore, if these names derived from a common protoform **BLjang or **BZjang meaning "see," it implies that the spirits were not so much "demons" as "specters" (from Latin spectrum, meaning "appearance; apparition") or "visions."

Another proposed etymology for xiangwang < s.[d]aŋʔmaŋʔ 象罔 is the Austro-Tai root s[u][y]aŋ meaning "spirit; god".

The semantics of wangliang 罔兩 or 魍魎 are complicated, as evident in these translation equivalents of wangliang and wanggxiang 罔象 in major Chinese-English dictionaries:

- 罔兩 see [魍魎]. 罔象 an imaginary monster which devours the brains of the dead underground. — 魍[魎] A sprite; an elf. An animal said to eat the brains of the dead. It fears pine trees and tigers, which is why pine trees are planted at graves, and stone tigers are set up.
- 罔兩 [see 魍魎] the penumbra. 罔象 an imaginary monster of the waters. — 魍魎 An elf. A sprite. An animal said to eat the brains of the dead underground.
- 罔兩 (1) spirits, monsters of the mountain rivers; (2) the penumbra. — 魍魎 a kind of monster.
- 罔兩 (1) spirits, demons of the wilds (also wr. 魍魎); (2) (AC) the penumbra, fringe shadow. — 魍魎 mountain spirits, demons.
- 魍魎 demons and monsters.

== Classical usages ==
Wangliang first appears in the Chinese classics around the 4th century BCE and was used in a variety of, sometimes contradictory, meanings. While the dates of some early texts are uncertain, the following examples are roughly arranged chronologically.

=== Guoyu ===
The Guoyu "Discourses of the States" (5th–4th century BCE) quotes Confucius using wangliang (魍魎) and wangxiang (罔象) to explain ancient demon names to Ji Huanzi (季桓子) (d. 492 BCE) of Lu.

Ji Huanzi (季桓子), a grandee of the state of Lu, caused a well to be dug, when they fetched up something like an earthen pot with a goat in it. He had [Zhong Ni] (Confucius) interrogated about it, in these words: "I dug a well, and got a dog; tell me what this is." On which the Sage answered: "According to what I have learned, it must be a goat; for I have heard that apparitions between trees and rocks are called Kui (夔)) and wangliang (魍魎), while those in the water are long (龍; "dragons"), and wangxiang (罔象), and those in the ground are called fenyang (羵羊). (魯語下)

This mushi (木石) literally means "trees and rocks" and figuratively refers to "inanimate beings; emotionlessness; indifference." Wei Zhao's commentary mentions that the wangxiang (罔象)) supposedly eats humans and is also called the muzhong (木腫; "tree/wood swelling"). The Shiji version of this story, set in 507 BCE during the reign of Duke Ding of Jin, writes wangliang (罔閬) with 閬 ("dry moat") and fenyang as 墳羊 ("grave sheep"), using 墳墳 ("grave; tomb") instead of 墳羵羊 ("spirit sheep") (cf. Huannanzi).

=== Zuozhuan ===
The Zuozhuan (late 4th century BCE) commentary on the Chunqiu (Spring and Autumn Annals, c. 6th–5th centuries BCE) contains one of the earliest recorded uses, if not the earliest, of chimeiwangliang (螭魅罔兩). In this context, it describes how Yu the Great, the legendary founder of the Xia dynasty, ordered the casting of the Nine Tripod Cauldrons to familiarize people with all the dangerous demons and monsters found in China's Nine Provinces.

In the past when the Xia dynasty still possessed virtue, the distant lands presented images of their strange creatures shenjian (神姦; "spirit rape") and the heads of the nine provinces contributed bronze so that vessels were cast which illustrated these creatures. Every kind of strange creature was completely depicted in order that the common people would know the gods and the demons. Thus, when people went to the rivers, lakes, mountains, and forests, they did not encounter these adverse beings nor did the Chimei-Hobgoblins in the hills and the Wangliang-Goblins in the waters accost them. As a result, harmony was maintained between those above and those dwelling on Earth below while everywhere, the people received the protection of Heaven.

=== Chuci ===
The "Seven Remonstrances" section (6th remonstrance, 《哀命》) of the Chuci (c. 3rd–2nd century BCE, with some later additions) poetically uses wangliang (罔兩) to mean "feeling absentminded and baseless," according to Wang Yi's commentary. The context describes a drowning suicide in a river.

My fainting soul shrank back, oppressed; And as I lay, mouth full of water, deep below the surface, The light of the sun seemed dim and very far above me. Mourning for its body, dissolved now by decay; My unhoused spirit drifted, disconsolate [罔兩].

=== Zhuangzi ===
The Zhuangzi (c. 3rd–2nd centuries BCE), a Daoist text, uses wangliang (罔兩) twice to name the allegorical character Penumbra, wangxiang (罔象) to mean "a water ghost," and xiangwang (象罔) for the character Amorphous.

Two chapters of the Zhuangzi recount similar versions of a dialogue between Wangliang (罔兩), or Penumbra, and Jing (景; "bright; shadow"). In modern usage, "penumbra" is translated as banying (半影; "half shadow").

Penumbra inquired of Shadow, saying, "One moment you move and the next moment you stand still; one moment you're seated and the next moment you get up. Why are you so lacking in constancy?" Shadow said, "Must I depend on something else to be what I am? If so, must what I depend upon in turn depend upon something else to be what it is? Must I depend upon the scales of a snake's belly or the forewings of a cicada? How can I tell why I am what I am? How can I tell why I 'm not what I'm not?" (2)

Wangxiang refers to a water demon named Nonimagoes. When Duke Huan of Qi (r. 685–643 BCE) was disturbed by seeing a ghost in a marsh, his chancellor Guan Zhong consulted a scholar from Qi named Master Leisurely Ramble (皇子告敖) about the various types of ghosts.

In pits there are pacers [履]; around stoves there are tufties [髻]. Fulgurlings [雷霆] frequent dust piles inside the door; croakers {{interp|倍阿 and twoads [鮭蠪] hop about in low-lying places to the northeast; spillsuns [泆陽] frequent low-lying places to the northwest. In water there are nonimagoes [罔象]; on hills there are scrabblers [峷]; on mountains there are unipedes [夔]; in the wilds there are will-o'-the-wisps [彷徨]; and in marshes there are bendcrooks [委蛇]. (19)

Xiangwang is the name of an allegorical character who discovers the xuanzhu (玄珠) lost by the legendary Yellow Emperor.

The Yellow Emperor was wandering north of Redwater when he ascended the heights of K'unlun and gazed toward the south. As he was returning home, he lost his pearl of mystery. Knowledge [知] was sent to search for the pearl, but he couldn't find it. Spidersight [離朱] was sent to search for the pearl, but he couldn't find it. Trenchancy [喫詬] was sent to search for the pearl, but he couldn't find it, whereupon Amorphous [象罔] was sent and he found it. "Extraordinary!" said the Yellow Emperor. "In the end, it was Amorphous who was able to find it." (12)

This allegory about the Yellow Emperor is part of the "knowledge story cycle" in which Zhuangzi illustrates the Daoist philosophy of anti-epistemology, emphasizing the value of not knowing.

=== Zhouli ===
The Zhouli (Rites of the Zhou Dynasty, 1st century BCE – 2nd century CE) records that during a royal funeral, the Fangxiangshi (方相氏; "exorcist") would leap into the grave to drive away any corpse-eating fangliang (方良), which Zheng Xuan's commentary identifies as the wangxiang (罔象).

It is incumbent on the Rescuer of the Country to cover himself with a bear's skin, to mask himself with four eyes of yellow metal, to put on a black coat and a red skirt, and thus, lance in hand and brandishing a shield, to perform, at the head of a hundred followers, a purification in every season of the year, which means the finding out of (haunted) dwellings and driving away contagious diseases. At royal funerals he walks ahead of the coffin and, arriving at the grave, he leaps into the pit to beat the four corners with his lance, in order to drive away the fang-liang spectres.

Li Shizhen's Bencao Gangmu (Compendium of Materia Medica, 1578) includes the following under the Wangliang entry: "Fangliang mentioned here is actually Wangliang . Wangliang loved to eat the livers of the dead, so people had to drive it away from tombs. It was afraid of tigers and arborvitae trees. That is why people placed stone tigers and planted arborvitae trees in graveyards."

=== Huainanzi ===
The Huainanzi (139 BCE) uses wangliang (魍魎) to mean "mindless; zombielike" and wangxiang (罔象) to refer to "a water monster." The term wangliang appears in a description of people's mentality during the mythological golden age of Fuxi and Nüwa.

Their motions were calm and unhurried; their gaze was tranquil and uncurious. In their ignorance, they all got what they needed to know. Aimlessly drifting, they did not know what they were looking for; zombielike, they did not know where they were going.

Major explains that wangliang (魍魎) was "a kind of corpse monster, said to feed on the brains of the buried dead." The term wangliang appears in a context with Fenyang, "a sheep-like earth deity" (cf. Guoyu above), and two mythical birds.

[When] water gives birth to waterbugs or clams, or mountains give birth to gold and jade, people do not find it strange. ... But when mountains give off Xiaoyang (梟陽), water gives birth to Wangxiang, wood gives birth to Bifang (畢方), and wells give birth to Fenyang (墳羊), people find it strange.

=== Lunheng ===
Wang Chong's Lunheng (80 CE) quotes the Liji (c. 2nd–1st century BCE), though not found in the received text, stating that one of the mythological emperor Zhuanxu's sons became a wangliang (魍魎)).

[Zhuanxu] had three sons living who, when they died, became the ghosts of epidemics. One living in the water of the [Yangzi], became the Ghost of Fever, the second in the [Luo] was a Water Spirit, the third, dwelling in the corners of palaces and houses, and in damp storerooms, would frighten children.

Wolfram Eberhard notes that the Luo River (洛水) (cf. the modern Luo rivers, in Henan and Shaanxi) was supposedly located in Yunnan, and associates wangliang (魍魎) with the mythological yu (魊; "a three-legged tortoise that causes malaria").

=== Shuowen Jiezi ===
Xu Shen's Shuowen Jiezi (121 CE) defines wangliang (魍魎): "It is a spectral creature of mountains and rivers. The King of Huainan says, 'The appearance of the wangliang is like that of a three-year-old child, with a red-black color, red eyes, long ears, and beautiful hair.'" The received Huainanzi text does not contain this royal quote.

Gan Bao's Soushenji ("Records of Searching for Spirits," c. 350 CE) similarly quotes the Xia Dingji (夏鼎記): "A [wangxiang] looks like a three-year-old child, has red eyes, a black color, big ears, and long arms with red claws. Even when fettered with ropes, it can find its [human] food."

=== Baopuzi ===
Ge Hong's Baopuzi (c. 320) mentions wangliang (魍魎) twice. One context lists the demon among the dangers facing foolish people who walk in mountain valleys.

Or they may be devoured by a tiger or a wolf; slain by a wang-liang demon (in the form of a brown child with red eyes, long ears, and a fine head of hair); or become hungry and remain without a method for dispensing with starchy foods; or become cold and lack a method for warming themselves. (6)

This translation includes a summarized description from the Shuowen Jiezi. In the other context, Ge Hong quotes oral instructions from his master, Zheng Yin (鄭隱) (c. 215–c. 302), about preserving zhenyi (真一; "Truth-Unity").

Unity is not hard to know; persistence is the difficulty. Guard it without loss, and you will never know exhaustion. On land, it routs evil animals; on water, dispels crocodiles and dragons. No fear of demons, nor of poisonous insects. Ghost will not dare approach, nor blades strike. (18)

=== Shuyiji ===
The Shuyiji (述異記; "Records of Strange Things"), compiled by Ren Fang (任昉) (460–508), contains a story about finding a fangxiang (方相; "demon that eats the brains of the dead"), also called fushu (弗述; "not state") or ao (媪; "old woman"). The Bencao Gangmu quotes the story and records the medicinal use of the brain of the brain-eating fangxiang.

The book Shuyi Ji: In the Qin Dynasty (221–206 BC) once an animal was caught by a hunter in Chencang (陳倉). It looked like a cross between a pig and a sheep. The hunter did not know what it was. At this time two young boys appeared. When asked, the boys said that it was called Fushu or Ao. It ate the brains of the dead in tombs. When a twig of arborvitae was inserted into its head, it would die. Although such things are not related to medicine, they concern the dead. So they are also recorded here for reference. Such an animal is called Fangxiang. If it has four eyes it is called Qi. Such things are all devils. In ancient times people made statues of human beings to represent such ghosts. It was recorded that Mr. Fei Zhangfang (費長房) once made medicinal pills of 李娥; Li E that contained the brain of Fangxiang as an ingredient. This prescription has been lost.

== See also ==
- List of legendary creatures from China
- Chimimōryō
- Mōryō - the entity in Japanese mythology
