= Truyền kỳ mạn lục =

16th-century Vietnamese historical text

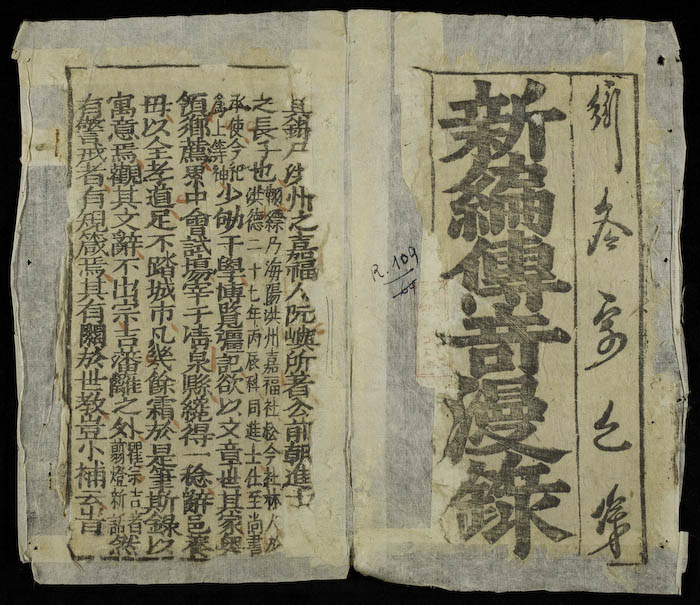
Tân biên truyền kỳ mạn lục (新編傳奇漫錄)

The Truyền kỳ mạn lục (傳奇漫錄, "Casual Records of Transmitted Strange Tales") is a 16th-century Vietnamese historical text, in part a collection of legends, by Nguyễn Dữ (阮嶼) composed in Classical Chinese. The collection was translated into French by UNESCO in 1962. Nguyễn Thế Nghi (阮世儀) translated this work into Vietnamese. His work is called Tân biên truyền kỳ mạn lục (新編傳奇漫錄).

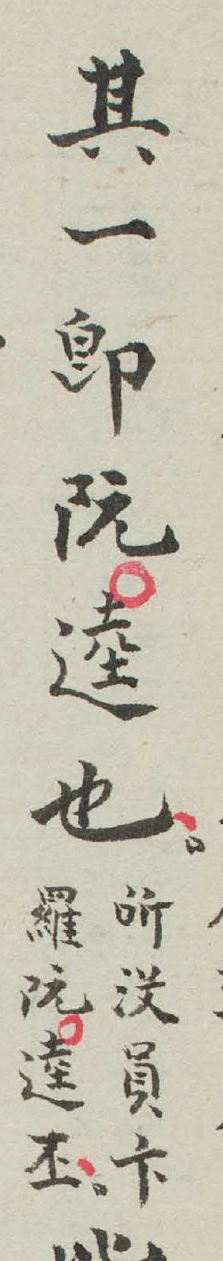
Example text from Truyền kỳ mạn lục, two lines, one in Classical Chinese (large) and the other in Vietnamese (small). Classical Chinese: 其一卽阮逵也。(Kỳ nhất tức Nguyễn Quỳ dã.) Vietnamese: 所𱥺員卞羅阮逵丕。(Thửa một viên bèn là Nguyễn Quỳ vậy.)

== Contents ==
=== Preface ===
The preface of Tân biên Truyền kỳ mạn lục tăng bổ giải âm tập chú (chữ Hán: 新編傳奇漫錄增補解音集註) was written by Hà Thiện Hán (何善漢) and edited by Nguyễn Lập Phu (阮立夫),

其錄乃洪州之嘉福人。阮嶼所著。公前朝進士翔縹之長子也。 (Note: 翔縹乃海陽洪州嘉福社。今松林社。人。於洪德二十七年。丙辰科同進士。仕至尙書承使。今祀爲上等神。(Tường Phiêu nãi Hải Dương Hồng Châu Gia Phúc xã. Kim Tùng Lâm xã. Nhân. Ư Hồng Đức nhị thập thất niên. Bính Thìn khoa đồng tiến sĩ. Sĩ chí Thượng thư thừa sử. Kim tự vị thượng đẳng thần.))少劬于學。博覧彊記。欲以文章世其家。粵領鄉薦。累中會試場。宰于清泉縣。纔得一稔。辭邑養母。以全孝道。足不踏城市。凡幾餘霜。於是筆斯錄以寓意焉。觀其文辭不出宗吉藩籬之外。 (Note: 瞿宗吉著翦燈新話。(Cù Tông Cát trứ Tiễn đăng tân thoại.))然有警戒者。有規箴焉。其有關於世教。豈小補云。峕 (Note: 古時字。(Cổ thời tự))

永定初年 (Note: 僞莫年號。(Nguỵ Mạc niên hiệu))

秋七月穀日。大安何善漢謹誌。

後學松州阮立夫編。

Kỳ lục nãi Hồng Châu chi Gia Phúc nhân. Nguyễn Dữ sở trứ. Công tiền triều tiến sĩ Tường Phiêu chi trưởng tử dã. Thiếu cù vu học. Bác lãm cường ký. Dục dĩ văn chương thế kỳ gia. Việt lĩnh Hương tiến. Luý trung Hội thí trường. Tể vu Thanh Tuyên huyện. Tài đắc nhất nẫm. Từ áp dưỡng mẫu. Dĩ toàn hiếu đạo. Túc bất đạp thành thị. Phàm kỷ dư sương. Ư thị bút tư lục dĩ ngụ ý yên. Quan kỳ văn từ bất xuất Tông Cát phiên ly chi ngoại. Nhiên hữu cảnh giới giả. Hữu quy châm yên. Kỳ hữu quan ư thế giáo. Khởi tiểu bổ vân. Thời

Vĩnh Định sơ niên.

Thu thất nguyệt sốc nhật. Đại An Hà Thiện Hán cẩn chí.

Hậu học Tùng Châu Nguyễn Lập Phu biên.

This record is authored by Nguyễn Dữ, a man from Gia Phúc in Hồng Châu. He is the eldest son of the former dynasty’s graduate scholar Nguyễn Tường Phiêu. From a young age, he was diligent in his studies, widely read, and possessed a strong memory. He wished to honor his family through his writing. After obtaining his provincial examination qualification, he passed the metropolitan exams several times and was appointed as a magistrate in Thanh Tuyền county. However, after only one season, he resigned to care for his mother, fulfilling his filial duties, and he avoided setting foot in the city for several years. Thus, he wrote this record to convey his thoughts. Observing his writings, one sees that they do not stray beyond the confines of the ancestral teachings of Confucius, yet they offer warnings and admonitions. They relate to the teachings for the world—could this not be of some benefit?

Recorded on an auspicious day in the seventh month of autumn, in the early years of Vĩnh Định, respectfully inscribed by Hà Thiện Hán of Đại An.

Compiled by later student Nguyễn Lập Phu of Tùng Châu.

Truyền kì mạn lục contains 20 stories (Vietnamese: truyện), tales (Vietnamese: lục) and records (Vietnamese: ký) in 4 volumes, each contains 5 works:

=== Volume 1 ===
- The Record at Xiang King's Temple (Hạng vương từ ký; 項王祠記)
- The Story of the Virtuous Wife in Khoái Châu (Khoái Châu nghĩa phụ truyện; 快州義婦傳)
- The Story of the Cotton Tree (Mộc miên thụ truyện; 木棉樹傳)
- The Tale of the Tea Boy Reincarnated (Trà đồng giáng đản lục; 茶童降誕錄)
- The Record of the Strange Encounter in the Western Camp (Tây viên kỳ ngộ ký; 西垣奇遇記)

=== Volume 2 ===
- The Tale of the Lawsuit in Dragon Court (Long đình đối tụng lục; 龍庭對訟錄)
- The Record of the Wrongdoing of Đào Thị (Đào Thị nghiệp oan ký; 陶氏業冤記)
- The Tale of the Judge of Tản Viên Temple (Tản Viên từ phán sự lục; 傘圓祠判事錄)
- The Tale of Từ Thức Marrying a Goddess (Từ Thức tiên hôn lục; 徐式仙婚錄)
- The Tale of Phạm Tử Hư Visiting Heaven (Phạm Tử Hư du thiên tào lục; 范子虛遊天曹錄)

=== Volume 3 ===
- The Tale of the Demon in Xương Giang (Xương Giang yêu quái lục; 昌江妖怪錄)
- The Tale of the Conversation with a Woodcutter at Na Mountain (Na sơn tiều đối lục; 那山樵對錄)
- The Tale of the Pagoda in Đông Triều (Đông Triều phế tự lục; 東潮廢寺傳)
- The Story of Thúy Tiêu (Thúy Tiêu truyện; 翠綃傳)
- The Record of the Night Party in Đà Giang (Đà Giang dạ ẩm ký; 沱江夜飲記)

=== Volume 4 ===
- The Story of the Woman in Nam Xương (Nam Xương nữ tử truyện; 南昌女子錄)
- The Story of Lý General (Lý tướng quân truyện; 李將軍傳)
- The Story of Lệ Nương (Lệ Nương truyện; 麗娘傳)
- The Record of the Poetry Talk in Kim Hoa (Kim Hoa thi thoại ký; 金華詩話記)
- The Tale of the Yaksha General (Dạ Xoa bộ soái lục; 夜叉部帥錄)

== See also ==
- Jiandeng Xinhua
- Kŭmo sinhwa
- Ugetsu Monogatari
