= Nguyễn Dữ =

Nguyễn Dữ (chữ Hán: 阮嶼), was a 16th-century poet of Vietnam known for the Truyền kỳ mạn lục (傳奇漫錄, Collection of Strange Tales).

Nguyễn Dữ was born in Đỗ Tùng village, Gia Phúc district, Hải Dương province, Việt Nam. He was a student of Nguyễn Bỉnh Khiêm (1491-1585), a well-known Vietnamese educator, philosopher, and poet.

Truyền kỳ mạn lục was his only publication.
