= Jiandeng Xinhua =

Ming dynasty collection of Chinese stories by Qu You

- A copy of Jiandeng Xinhua, collected by the National Library of China
- Author: Qu You
- Original title: 剪燈新話
- Publication date: 1378
- Publication place: Ming China

Jiandeng Xinhua (剪燈新話, lit. New Stories Told While Trimming the Wick or New Stories After Snuffing the Lamp; 1378) is an early Ming dynasty collection of Chinese stories by Qu You (瞿佑). The book consist of 21 stories in 4 volumes. It was succeeded by a second book Jiandeng Xinhua wai er zhong.

== Background and precursors ==
Jiandeng Xinhua came from a long line of Chinese story collections that goes back to the end of the Han dynasty. Notable Chinese story collections that date from at least the 3rd century include: Bowuzhi, Soushen Ji, Xijing Zaji, Lieyi Zhuan, A New Account of the Tales of the World, You Ming Lu, Shi Yi Ji, Miscellaneous Morsels from Youyang, Taiping Guangji, Yijian Zhi, etc.

Some of the most famous Chinese and East Asian folk or fairy tales, such as Li Ji slays the Giant Serpent, Renshi zhuan, The World Inside a Pillow, The Governor of Nanke, The Tale of Li Wa, and Hongxian can be found in these collections.

== Influence ==
This collection, together with Li Changqi (given name Li Zhen)'s Jiandeng Yuhua (剪燈餘話, 1420) and Shao Jingzhan's Mideng Yinhua (覓燈因話, 1592), were later often collectively referred to as the "three deng" (三燈; "three lamps") or sometimes the "three hua" (三話), and during the Xinhai year (1791) of the Qianlong reign of the Qing dynasty, all three were printed together under the title Sandeng Conghua (三燈叢話) in special collectors' edition.

Jiandeng Xinhua, a major success at the time, proved to be highly influential later on, as it directly inspired some of the most popular fictional literature in other places. It became the model for the first fiction in Korean literature, Kŭmo sinhwa, also written in the Chinese language, and Sin Kwanghan’s short story collection Kijae kii, and it was also the model for the Vietnamese collections Truyền kỳ mạn lục and Truyền kỳ tân phả, and the Japanese collections Otogi Bōko, Inuhariko, and Ugetsu Monogatari, etc. Jiandeng Xinhua became the primary influence for the Kaidan stories and folktales of Japan.

According to Qiao Guanghui, this "deng" ("lamp") literary tradition became a literary phenomenon across East Asia for centuries.

A copy of Jiandeng Xinhua, collected by the Zhejiang University

Pages from a printed edition of Jiandeng Xinhua, from the Waseda University

A printed edition of Jiandeng Xinhua, from the National Digital Library of Korea

Chinese collections directly inspired by Jiandeng Xinhua (Note: All these collections either acknowledge the influence of Jiandeng Xinhua in their author's prefaces or introductions, uses the "lamp" (燈) imagery in its prose, or consciously style or market their collections as part of the "deng"/"lamp" (燈) literary tradition)
Pages from Li Changqi (李昌祺)'s Jiandeng Yuhua (剪燈餘話), 1420. Li's Jiandeng Yuhua, which was inspired by Qu's collection, was also a success, and in turn influenced many later works

Pages from Zhao Bi (趙弼)'s collection Xiaopin ji (效顰集), 1436, which says the collection was inspired by Qu You in the preface

Pages from Tao Fu (陶輔)'s collection Huaying ji (花影集), early 1500s. Tao names Jiandeng Xinhua, Jiandeng Yuhua, and Xiaopin ji as his major influences in the preface of the collection

A copy of Shao Jingzhan (邵景詹)'s Mideng Yinhua (覓燈因話), 1592, from Peking University collection

Pages from Zi Haozi (自好子)'s Jiandeng Conghua (剪燈叢話) (1593-1621), a greatest hits collection consist of 137 stories, that directly market itself as part of "deng" (燈) tradition/school

Pages from Wang Jian (王椷)'s Qiudeng Conghua (秋燈叢話), 1780

Xuan Ding's Yeyu Qiudeng Lu (夜雨秋燈錄) collection, 1877 (Note: This collection evokes the atmosphere of the "deng" school, as its title suggests, but was stylistically more influenced by Liaozhai zhiyi.)

Foreign collections directly inspired by Jiandeng Xinhua
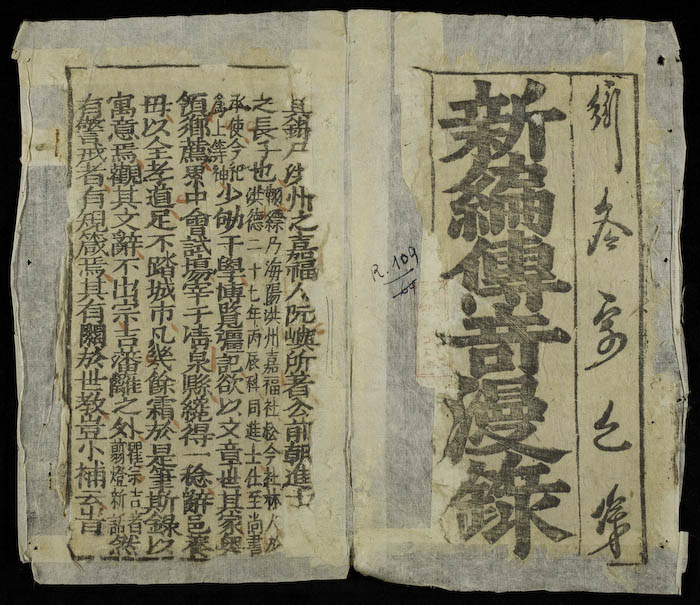
Nguyễn Dữ's Truyền kỳ mạn lục, 16th century

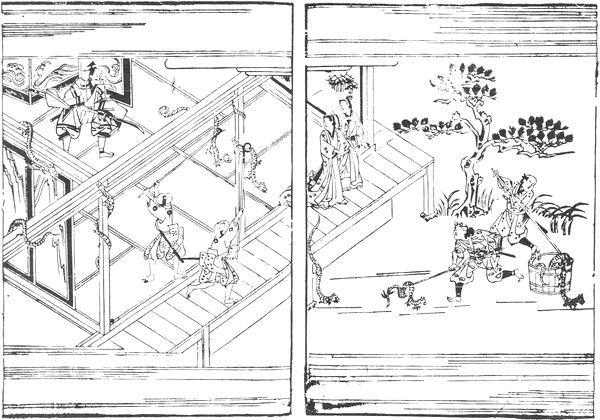
Illustrations from Asai Ryōi's Otogi Bōko, 17th century

Asai Ryōi's Inuhariko, late 17th century

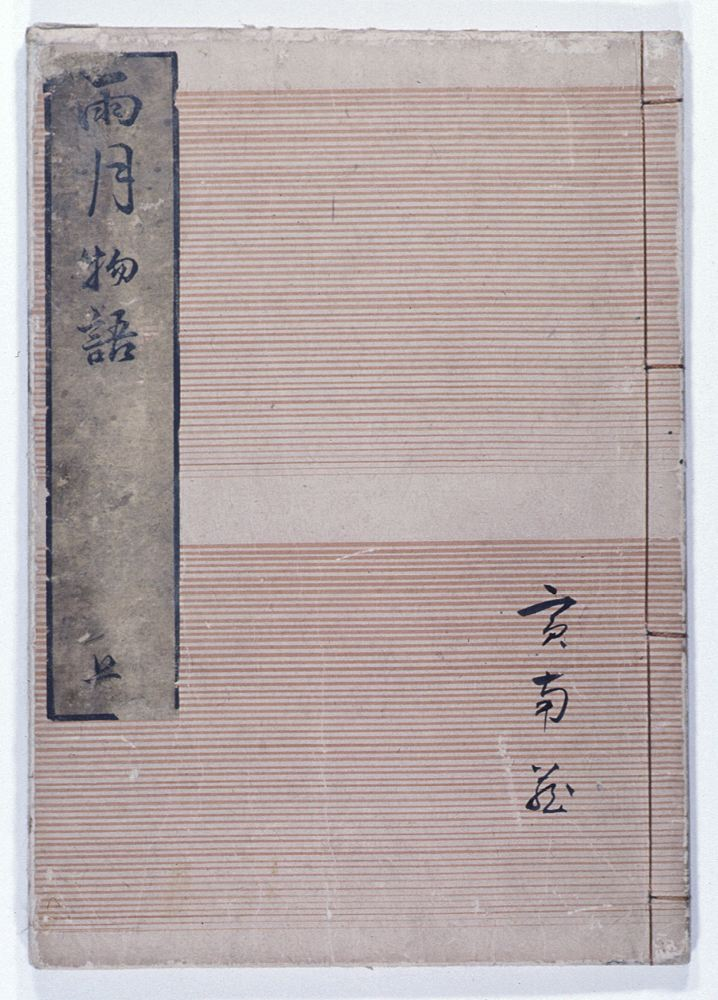
Ueda Akinari's Ugetsu Monogatari, 18th century
