= The Foreign Monks =

- Short story by Pu Songling
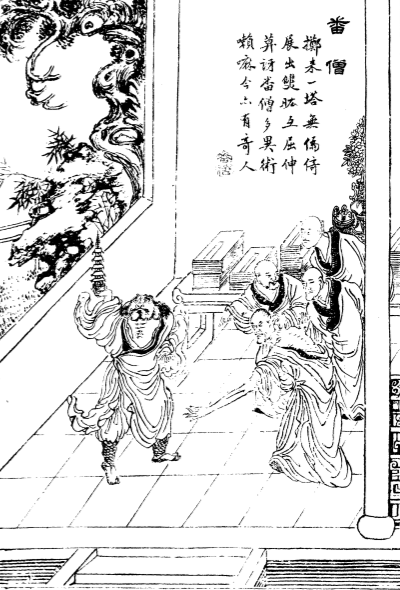
- 19th-century illustration from Xiangzhu liaozhai zhiyi tuyong (Liaozhai Zhiyi with commentary and illustrations; 1886)
- Original title: 番僧 (Fanseng)
- Translator: Sidney L. Sondergard (2008)
- Country: China
- Language: Chinese
- Genres: Zhiguai; Chuanqi; Short story

Publication
- Published in: Strange Tales from a Chinese Studio
- Media type: Print (Book)
- Publication date: 1740

Chronology
A Brilliant Light (犬灯)	The Fox Concubine (狐妾)

"The Foreign Monks" (Chinese: 番僧; pinyin: Fān sēng) is a short story by Pu Songling first published in Strange Tales from a Chinese Studio in 1740. It concerns two foreign monks and their amazing feats.

== Plot ==
Pu Songling narrates a story told to him by a monk named Ti Kong (體空): Two monks claiming to be from the West arrive in Qingzhou, where they are received personally by two servants of the local Prefect and hosted at a nearby monastery. However, a high-ranking monk named Lingpei (靈轡) gives the foreign monk poor treatment, despite the veneration Lingpei's servants have for them.

Given the enigmatic and legendary nature of the West, the foreign monks, referred to as arhats, are asked to demonstrate their supernatural powers. Readily obliging, the first monk flings a miniature pagoda from his sleeves towards a crevice in the temple ceiling, and "Buddhist relics inside the pagoda (begin) to emit a glow that (illuminates) the entire room". The second monk can extend his left arm to some six or seven chi and shrink his right hand to virtual nothingness, and vice versa.

== Literary significance ==
"The Foreign Monks" is one of the few Strange Tales entries that revolve around monks; others include "This Transformation" and "The Monk's Medicine". Pu likely encountered many monks in real-life and this provided inspiration for such works. Unlike most other stories in Strange Tales from a Chinese Studio, Pu Songling alleges to be recounting a first-hand narration from a monk Ti Kong verbatim in "The Foreign Monks". Sidney Sondergard writes that it is "intriguing to consider the implications of Pu functioning as a kind of ethnographer of this specific culture-sharing group".
