= Zhongxian =

Zhongxian may refer to:

- Zhong County (Chinese: 忠县; pinyin: zhōng xiàn) in Chongqing, China
- Zhongxian, Fujian (Chinese: 中仙; pinyin: zhōngxiān), town in Youxi County, Fujian, China

== People ==
- Qian Hongzuo (928–947), posthumously known as King Zhongxian, third king of Wuyue
- Xuedou Chongxian (980–1052), also known as Xuedou Zhongxian, Chinese Chan Buddhist monk
- Shang Zhongxian (fl. 13th century), Chinese dramatist
- Wei Zhongxian (1568–1627), Chinese eunuch of the Ming dynasty
- Zhang Zhongxian (1926–2022), Chinese general of the People's Liberation Army
- Zhao Zhongxian (born 1941), Chinese physicist

== See also ==
- Zhongxian Ganbu, 2010 doctoral thesis
