= A Strange Matter Concerning Pigeons =

1740 short story by Pu Songling

- Short story by Pu Songling
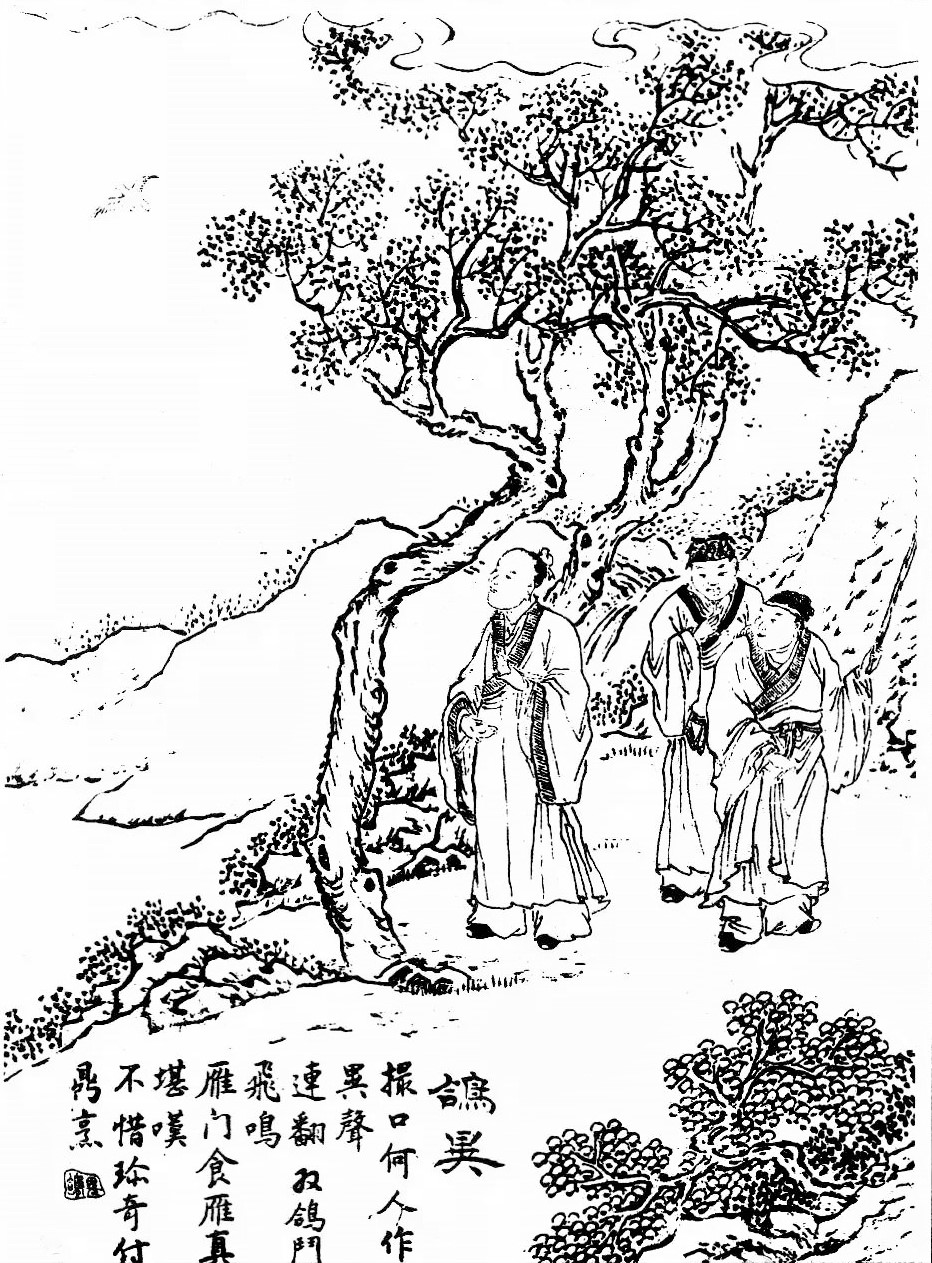
- 19th-century illustration from Xiangzhu liaozhai zhiyi tuyong (Liaozhai Zhiyi with commentary and illustrations; 1886)
- Original title: 鸽异 (Ge yi)
- Translator: Sidney L. Sondergard (2009)
- Country: China
- Language: Chinese
- Genres: Zhiguai; Chuanqi; Short story

Publication
- Published in: Strange Tales from a Chinese Studio
- Media type: Print (Book)
- Publication date: 1740

Chronology
| Zhou the Third (周三) | Niezheng (聂政) |

"A Strange Matter Concerning Pigeons" (Chinese: 鸽异; pinyin: Gē yì), also translated variously as "A Strange Tale of Pigeons" or "A Strangeness of Pigeons", is a short story by Pu Songling first published in Strange Stories from a Chinese Studio (1740). It revolves around Zhang Youliang, an avid pigeon-keeper who befriends a fellow collector and is entrusted to care for a few of his pigeons. The story has been translated into both English and French, and adapted into an art installation.

== Plot ==
Zouping resident Zhang Youliang (张幼量) is a staunch pigeon-keeper who has been scouring the country for the rarest and most prized pigeon species, based on information from Pigeon Handbook (鸽经). He cares for his pigeons like they were his children; however, Zhang's pigeons become paralysed and start dying one day, ostensibly due to their excessive sleep patterns. Zhang journeys to Guangling, Jiangsu, and purchases "a lively pigeon with an extremely petite body". He names it "Night Walker" (夜游) after its presence miraculously jolts the other pigeons out of their paralysis and sickness. Zhang's pigeons are regarded by fellow pigeon-keepers as the best, and a proud Zhang self-styles himself as a "pigeon master".

One evening, a traveller named He Zudao (何足道) knocks on Zhang's door and enquires about his pigeons. After looking at Zhang's collection, He, being a fellow pigeon collector, invites him to view his. Two of He's white pigeons appear and Zhang realises that they are greatly superior to any in his own collection. At Zhang's request, He gifts him with two other white pigeons, and Zhang successfully manages to breed many more white pigeons. Some time afterwards, Zhang's father's friend, a government official, casually asks him the number of pigeons he has. Suspecting his father's friend to be an avid pigeon-keeper as well, Zhang gifts him two white pigeons.

The next time they meet, Zhang asks the official about the pigeons he gave him; he learns that, to his horror, the official unknowingly ate them. Thereafter, in his dreams, Zhang Youliang encounters a disappointed He Zudao, who chastises him for being negligent in caring for his forebears. With that, He transforms into a white pigeon and flies off with the rest of Zhang's white pigeons. True enough, Zhang discovers in reality that all his remaining white pigeons have vanished. Distraught, Zhang gives away the rest of his collection.

Pu makes a distinction between love and obsession in his postscript, and also appends two other stories "as funny as Zhang's"; they are similar in nature, but revolve around carps and tea leaves respectively.

== Publication history ==
Originally titled "Ge yi" (鸽异), the short story was written by Pu Songling, and first appeared in his anthology of close to 500 "marvel tales" written in the zhiguai or chuanqi style, published in 1740. It was first translated into English by Yang Hsien-yi and Gladys Yang in the tenth volume of Chinese Literature (1962). Since then, several other English translations of "Ge yi" have been published, including in the third volume of Sidney L. Sondergard's Strange Tales from a Chinese Studio (2009), and in Selected Tales from Liaozhai (1981). The story was translated into French as "Des pigeons extraordinares" by Li Tche-houa.

== Inspiration ==
Among the many, many varieties of pigeons, there are the Lady Stars of Shanxi, the Crane Beauties of Shandong, the Axil Butterflies of Guizhou, the Backflippers of Sichuan and Hubei, and the Allsharps of Zhejiang: each of them are an unusual species. There are also Boot Heads, Dappled Eggs, Great Whites, Black Stones, Married Couples, Spotted Dog Eyes, and more names than I can count on my fingers, some that only a real enthusiast can identify.

— Opening paragraph of "A Strange Matter Concerning Pigeons", as translated by Sidney L. Sondergard

Judith T. Zeitlin writes in Historian of the Strange (1997) that "(t)he stylistic influence of catalogues and manuals is particularly evident in the unusual opening of the tale (...)", with regard to the technical accuracy of Pu's listing of various pigeon types. This is similar to another Liaozhai tale "The Fighting Cricket", in which Pu makes use of technical cricket-related details from a guidebook to conjure up a story. In "A Strange Matter Concerning Pigeons", "(Pu) explicitly acknowledges his debt to such a catalogue (...)", most likely "some version of Zhang Wanzhong's Pigeon Handbook".

The protagonist, Zhang Youliang, was named after a real person who, like Zhang Wanzhong, was another member of the prominent Zhang family in Zouping. The real Zhang Youliang was actually obsessed with rocks rather than pigeons and once arranged for a team of 300 oxen to drag a rock down from the mountains to adorn his famous garden; Zeitlin conjectures that the author may have confused the names of these two aristocratic aesthetes.

== Themes and analysis ==
Metamorphosis is a major plot device in "A Strange Matter Concerning Pigeons", and by presenting the pigeon spirit He Zudao as a "handsome youth in white garb", Pu emphasises "the continuum between states of being, which facilitates the assimilation of the non-human into the human realm." Li Wai-yee points out in Enchantment and Disenchantment (2014) that Pu regarded "commitment to an ideal, even when it appears eccentric or misguided," as "laudable". She writes that "the irony becomes cutting" in tales like "A Strange Matter Concerning Pigeons", in which there is "a lapse of devotion to the object of attachment".

== Adaptations ==
New York City-based visual artist Hannah Wasileski's installation A Strange Tale of Pigeons is based on Pu's short story, and features "hand-painted animations created on a Buddha Board, projected onto four tall, scroll-like screens". It was performed at the HERE Arts Center at New York City in September 2012, alongside an Yingning (another Liaozhai tale) exhibit.
