= A Brilliant Light =

- Short story by Pu Songling
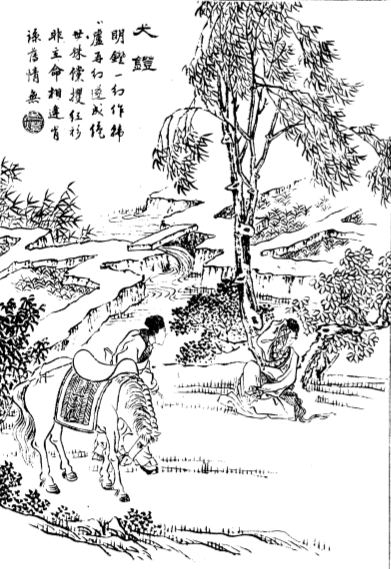
- The servant reencounters his fox lover; 19th-century illustration from Xiangzhu liaozhai zhiyi tuyong (Liaozhai with commentary and illustrations; 1886)
- Original title: 犬灯 (Quandeng)
- Translator: Sidney Sondergard (2008)
- Country: China
- Language: Chinese
- Genres: Zhiguai; Chuanqi; Short story

Publication
- Published in: Strange Tales from a Chinese Studio
- Media type: Print (Book)
- Publication date: 1740

Chronology
| Stealing Ghosts (谕鬼) | The Foreign Monks (番僧) |

"A Brilliant Light" (simplified Chinese: 犬灯; traditional Chinese: 犬燈; pinyin: Quǎndēng; lit. 'Dog Light') is a short story by the Chinese writer Pu Songling collected in Strange Tales from a Chinese Studio.

== Plot ==
A servant of gongsheng Han Maochun (Note: Pu refers to him by his courtesy name Daqian (大千).) (韩茂椿) is awoken from his slumber by a bright light that turns into a dog before morphing into a woman. Deducing that she must be a fox spirit, the servant develops a romantic relationship with her; however, his love is put to the test when Han demands for her capture. Later at midnight, the servant attempts to restrain the fox by grabbing onto her blouse, which she rips off before fleeing. Thereafter, he reencounters her along the roadside where she raises the possibility of reconciliation between them and invites him into a large mansion for a drink. Some time later, the servant makes his move – only to realise he had been in the middle of a sorghum field.

== Publication history ==
Originally titled "Quandeng" (犬灯), the short story was written by Pu Songling, and first appeared in his anthology of close to 500 "marvel tales" written in the zhiguai or chuanqi style, published in 1740. It was fully translated into English by Sidney Sondergard in her second volume of Strange Tales from a Chinese Studio published in 2008.
