= The Dream of Akinosuke =

Japanese folktale

"The Dream of Akinosuke" (あきのすけの夢, Akinosuke no Yume) is a Japanese folktale, made famous outside Japan by Lafcadio Hearn's translation of the story in Kwaidan: Stories and Studies of Strange Things.

The story is said to bring together several strands of Japanese folklore, including the fact that even insects can manipulate the human soul. "The Dream of Akinosuke" also references Horai, another Japanese folktale recorded by Hearn in Kwaidan. It is evidently derived from a Japanese adaptation of the Tang dynasty tale, "The Governor of Nanke", (南柯太守传) by Li Gongzuo (李公佐). However, there are some significant differences.

== Legend summary ==
"The Dream of Akinosuke" tells of Akinosuke, a gōshi (yeoman or land-holding farmer) living in feudal Japan. Akinosuke often takes a nap under a great cedar tree in his garden. One day, Akinosuke is sitting under this tree, eating and chatting with friends, when he suddenly becomes very tired, and falls asleep.

Upon waking, he finds himself still under the tree, but his friends have gone. Coming toward him, Akinosuke sees a great royal procession, full of richly dressed attendants. The procession approaches him, and informs him that the King of Tokoyo (a dream world that Hearn compares to Horai) requests his presence at his court. Akinosuke agrees to accompany the procession, and when he arrives at the palace, he is invited before the King. To his astonishment, the King offers Akinosuke his daughter in marriage, and the two are wed immediately.

A few days later, the King tells Akinosuke that he is being sent to be the governor of an island province. Together with his beautiful wife, Akinosuke goes to the island, and rules it for many years. The island is idyllic, with bountiful crops and no crime, and Akinosuke's wife bears him seven children.

However, one day, without warning, Akinosuke's wife becomes ill and dies. The grieving Akinosuke goes to great trouble to hold a proper funeral, and he erects a large monument in his wife's memory. After some time, a message arrives from the King, saying that Akinosuke will be sent back to where he came from, and telling him not to worry about his children, as they will be well cared for. As Akinosuke sails away from the island, it suddenly disappears, and he is shocked to find himself sitting under the cedar tree, his friends still chatting as if nothing has happened.

Akinosuke recounts his dream. One of his friends tells him that he was only asleep for a few moments, but while he was asleep, something strange happened: a yellow butterfly seemed to come from Akinosuke's mouth. The butterfly was grabbed by an ant and taken under the cedar tree. Just before Akinosuke awoke, the butterfly reappeared from under the tree. His friends wonder if the butterfly could have been Akinosuke's soul, and the group decides to investigate. Under the cedar tree, they find a great kingdom of ants, which Akinosuke realizes was the kingdom he visited in his dream. Looking for his island home, he finds a separate nest, and investigating further, he finds a small stone that resembles a burial monument. Digging beneath it, he finds a small female ant buried in a clay coffin.

== See also ==
- Japanese mythology
- Kwaidan
- Rip van Winkle
