= Han Hong =

Han Hong may refer to:

- Han Hong (general) (765–823), a Chinese general of the Tang Dynasty
- Han Hong (poet), a Tang Dynasty poet
- Han Hong (mandarin), a Song dynasty mandarin and ancestor of the Indonesian Han family of Lasem
- Han Hong (singer) (born 1971), a Chinese singer and songwriter
- Han Hong (econometrician), an econometrician and professor at the department of economics, Stanford University.
