= Lady Ren =

Lady Ren may refer to:

- Empress Ren (fl. 315–338), wife of Cheng Han's founding emperor Li Xiong
- Ren Neiming (865–918), wife of Min's founder Wang Shenzhi
- Lady Ren, the protagonist of the 8th-century short story "The Tale of Miss Ren"
