= The Fighting Cricket =

- Short story by Pu Songling
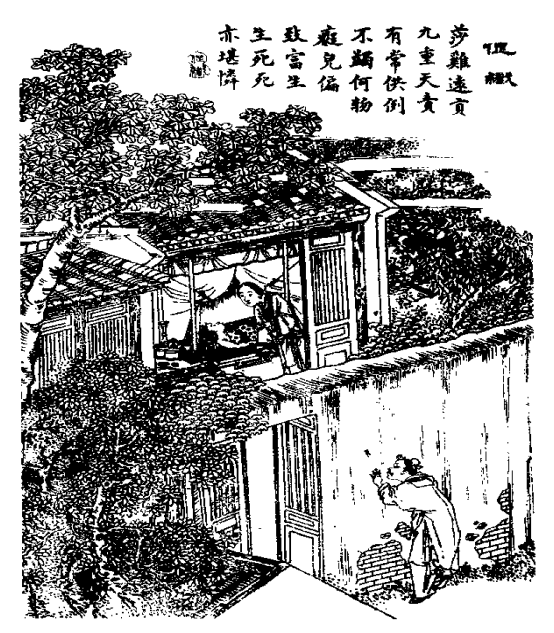
- 19th-century illustration from Xiangzhu liaozhai zhiyi tuyong (Liaozhai Zhiyi with commentary and illustrations; 1886)
- Original title: 促织 (Cuzhi)
- Country: China
- Language: Chinese
- Genre(s): Chuanqi; Short story

Publication
- Published in: Strange Tales from a Chinese Studio
- Publication date: 1740

Chronology
Gongsun Jiuniang (公孙九娘)	Liu Xiucai (柳秀才)

"The Fighting Cricket" (simplified Chinese: 促织; traditional Chinese: 促織; pinyin: Cùzhi) is a short story by Pu Songling first published in Strange Tales from a Chinese Studio. Set in a society whose emperor has an obsession with fighting crickets, the story follows a boy who metamorphoses into one such cricket to save his father.

== Publication history ==
The story was originally titled "Cuzhi" (促織) and first appeared in Pu Songling's anthology of supernatural tales, Strange Tales from a Chinese Studio (Liaozhai) published in 1740. It was first translated into English as "The Fighting Cricket" by the British sinologist Herbert A. Giles and was included in his 1880 translation of Strange Tales. It reappeared with modifications in a subsequent edition, published in 1908.

== Inspiration ==
Cricket fighting was commonplace during the Qing dynasty which Pu lived in, with established clubs in the more developed cities like Beijing, Tianjin, and Shanghai. Pu evidently drew some inspiration from the Ming dynasty guidebook to Beijing titled A Brief Guide to Sights in the Capital, having published a condensed version of it with a foreword of his own. Technical details found in A Brief Guide, like the diet of a cricket and the different types of cricket, are incorporated in Pu's short story, while other phrases in the guidebook are copied verbatim. Pu's "connoisseurship" and the influence of specialised handbooks on him can also be seen in another Strange Tales story titled "A Strange Matter Concerning Pigeons" which revolves around pigeons instead of crickets.

== Themes and analysis ==
Adrian Hsia argues that in "The Fighting Cricket", Pu is rallying against the unfair treatment of the peasants that he would have personally witnessed: "The fighting cricket is a sign of the inhuman exploitation through taxes which can destroy every family." He likens the story to "The Metamorphosis" by Franz Kafka, pointing out that both works "create, through their animal figures, an artistic world which is parallel to the human world" while adding that the "affinity" between the two stories was "striking" to Chinese critics.
