= Tale of the Transcendent Marriage of Dongting Lake =

Chinese chuanqi (fantasy) short story by Li Chaowei

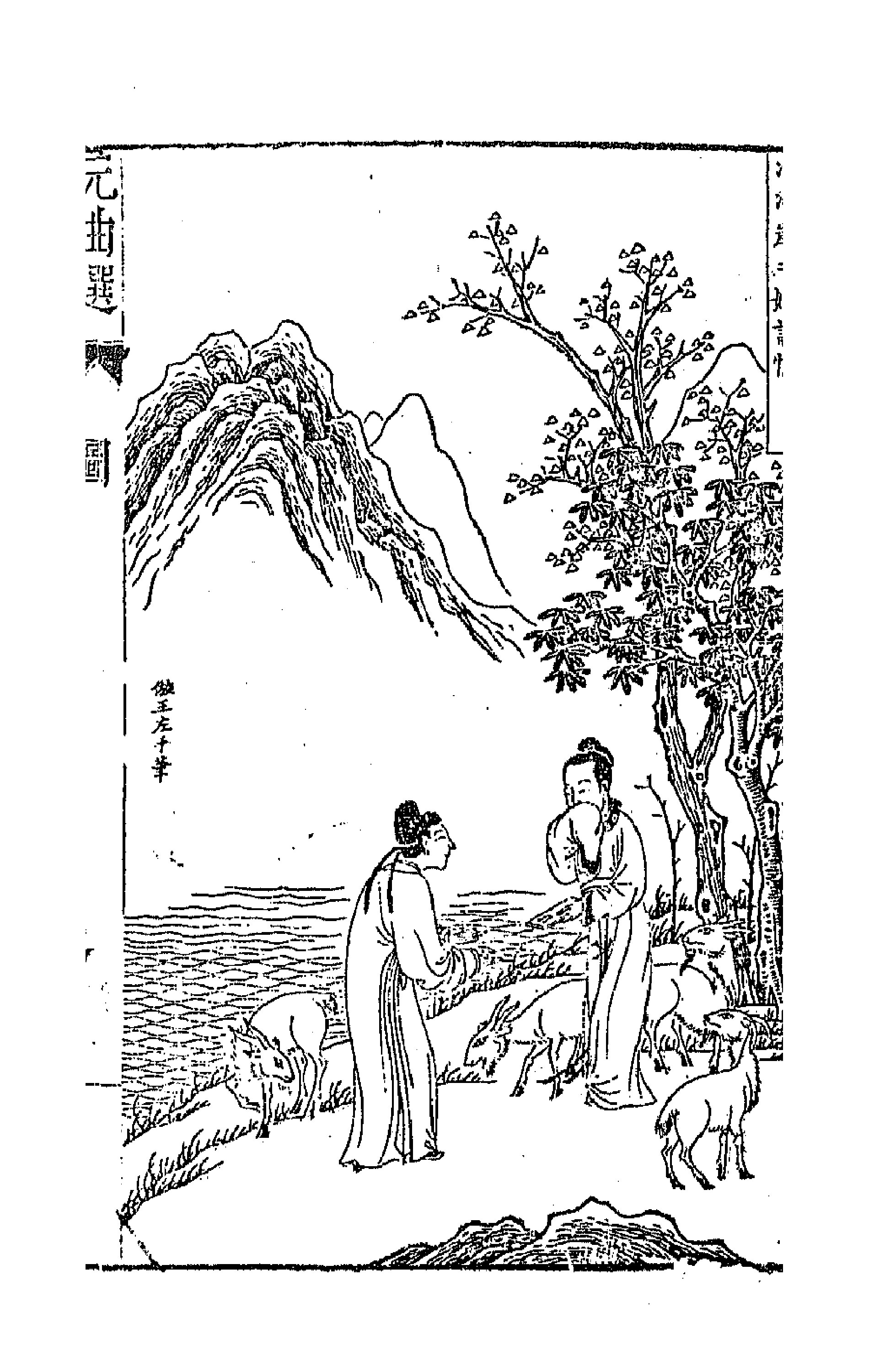
Liu Yi encounters the Dragon Girl on the bank of the Jing River. Illustration from a 1615 anthology of zaju plays which includes Shang Zhongxian's stage adaptation.

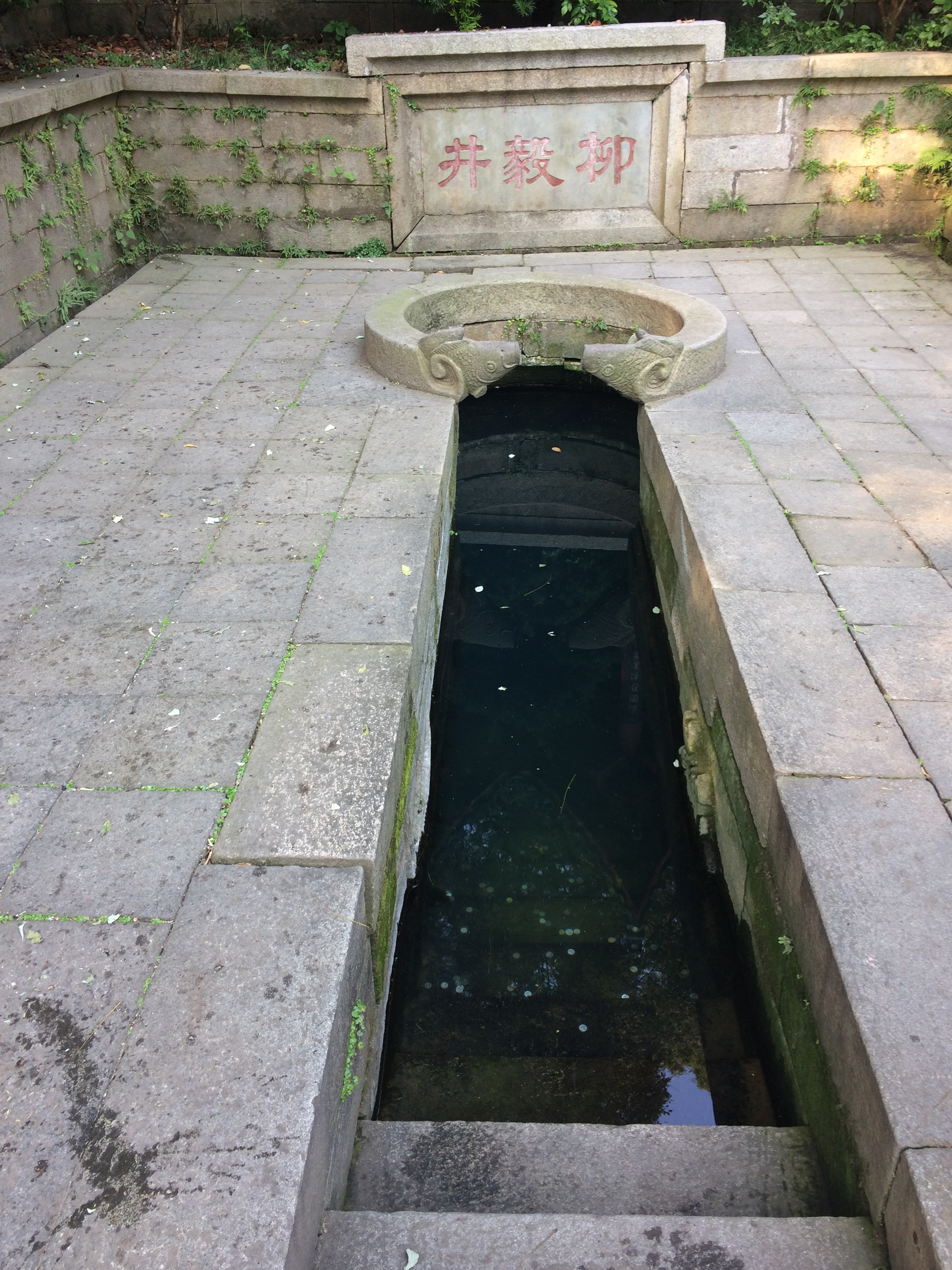
Liu Yi Well, supposedly the site where Liu Yi entered Dongting Lake, a tourist attraction on Junshan Island.

"The Tale of the Supernatural Marriage at Dongting" (Chinese: 洞庭靈姻傳), better known as "The Story of Liu Yi" (Chinese: 柳毅傳), is a Chinese chuanqi (fantasy) short story from the Tang dynasty, written by Li Chaowei (李朝威) in the second half of the 8th century. It is about a young man named Liu Yi who, out of sympathy, agrees to deliver a letter from a distressed dragon to her father, the Dragon King of Lake Dongting; following her rescue and the death of her abusive husband, the Dragon Girl transforms into a beautiful woman and marries Liu Yi.

== Translations ==
English translations include:

- "Story of the Daughter of the Dragon-king of Tung-t'ing Lake" (tr. E.D. Edwards) in Chinese Prose Literature of the T'ang Period (A.D. 618–906), Volume 2 (Arthur Probsthain, 1938)
- "The Dragon's Daughter" (tr. Wang Chi-chen) in Traditional Chinese Tales (Columbia University Press, 1944)
- "The Dragon King's Daughter" (tr. Yang Hsien-yi and Gladys Yang) in The Dragon King's Daughter: Ten Tang Dynasty Stories (Foreign Languages Press, 1954)
- "The Legendary Marriage at Tung-t'ing" (tr. Russel E. McLeod) in Traditional Chinese Stories: Themes and Variations (Cheng & Tsui Company, 1986)
- "Liu Yi; or, Tale of the Transcendent Marriage of Tung-t'ing Lake" (tr. Glen Dudbridge) in The Columbia Anthology of Traditional Chinese Literature (Columbia University Press, 1994)
- "The Dragon King's Daughter" (tr. John Minford) in Classical Chinese Literature: An Anthology of Translations, Volume 1: From Antiquity to the Tang Dynasty (Columbia University Press, 2000)
- "The Tale of the Supernatural Marriage at Dongting" (tr. Meghan Cai) in Tang Dynasty Tales: A Guided Reader, Volume 2 (World Scientific, 2016)

== Adaptations ==
In the 13th century, Shang Zhongxian (尚仲賢) adapted the story into a zaju titled Liu Yi Delivers a Letter to Dongting Lake (洞庭湖柳毅傳書, English version: Liu Yi and the Dragon Princess translated by David Hawkes, The Chinese University of Hong Kong Press, 2003). In the 17th century, Li Yu created a chuanqi play titled Tower in the Mirage (蜃中樓) by combining Shang's play with that of another play featuring a Dragon Girl, Scholar Zhang Boils the Sea at Shamen Island (沙門島張生煮海).

The Qing dynasty novel Steep Cloud Tower (躋雲樓) is also based on Liu Yi's story.
