= Du Zichun =

Classical Chinese short story

"Du Zichun" (Chinese: 杜子春; pinyin: Dù Zichūn) is a short story first published in the Tang dynasty. It revolves around the eponymous protagonist and a Taoist priest, who enlists his help in producing the elixir of life.

== Plot ==
After spending all of his inheritance, Du Zichun (杜子春) encounters an elderly stranger who hands him an enormous amount of money. Du spends all of that, only to meet the old man for a second time, who passes him an even greater amount of money. Despite resolving to be more disciplined, Du finds himself penniless again. For yet another time, the old man bails Du out. This time, he uses the money to help both the needy and his family members. Upon reconvening with the old man, Du learns that he is a Taoist priest. The priest brings Du to Mount Hua, where he is making the elixir of life. Du is tasked with smelting the elixir; the priest enjoins him to remain silent no matter what happens.

Du begins to experience a series of intense hallucinations involving an army, terrifying animals, and violent weather. He is unfazed, even as he meets a legion of demons who boil and dismember his wife, before fatally torturing Du himself. Reborn as the daughter of a local magistrate in Shanfu County, Songzhou, Du-as-woman remains silent for several years and is assumed to be mute, although she is also reputed for her beauty. She marries a scholar and gives birth to a boy. Two years pass, and not a single word has been exchanged between husband and wife. Exasperated at Du-as-woman's silence, the scholar takes their child and dashes him against the rocks. Du lets out a cry of anguish and instantly finds himself back at Mount Hua. The elixir is destroyed and the temple is engulfed by purple flames. The priest tells Du that although he has renounced feelings of joy, anger, sadness, and fear, he has not let go of love. Disappointed in himself, Du returns home. He later attempts to retrace his steps at Mount Hua but the old man is nowhere to be seen.

== Authorship and publication history ==
"Du Zichun" was first published in the Tang dynasty and began circulating as a popular story in the 800s. It is the first entry of the Xuanguai lu (玄怪錄; Records of the Mysterious and Strange) by Niu Sengru, dated between 805 and 826. The story is also collected in the Xu Xuanguai lu (續玄怪錄; Sequel to the Record of Dark Mysteries) by Li Fuyan (李復言), as well as the Taiping Guangji, which attributes authorship to Li. However, according to Sing-chen Lydia Chiang, "the consensus of several contemporary scholars points to Niu Sengru as the real author of the story." An English translation of the story by James R. Hightower, titled "The Alchemist", was published in 2000.

== Analysis and reception ==
According to Carrie Reed, the story is an example of chuanqi (tales of the strange). Whereas the story has a Taoist setting, Sheng-Tai Chang argues that its themes are "clearly Buddhist". John Minford and Joseph Lau write that the story pertains to the "illusory nature of human existence" and the "reality that lies beyond the illusion of the emotions." Lau adds that "Du Zichun" is a "moral commentary on the paradoxical nature of immortality", while David Shulman describes the story as a "powerful illustration of the pathos and paradox of ultimate detachment." William Nienhauser writes that the story is "an exploration of the limits of the self and transformation".

Qian Xiyan (钱希言), a literary critic active in the late Ming dynasty, found that the story justified his "overwhelming grief at the death of his young son".

== Inspiration ==
"Du Zichun" has many significant parallels with "Lieshi chi" (烈士池; "Pool of the Hero"), a seventh-century parable collected in the seventh volume of the Great Tang Records on the Western Regions by Xuanzang. In "Lieshi chi", a Taoist priest similarly rescues a man from poverty and tasks him with helping to cultivate the elixir of life. The man remains silent throughout a perceived sixty-five years of reincarnation, only to forget his vow after being reborn as a woman whose husband is threatening to kill their child unless she speaks. Ninth-century stories like "Wei Zidong" (韋自東) and "Xiao Dongxuan" (蕭洞玄), written around the same time as "Du Xichun", also share many important plot points with "Lieshi chi".

== Adaptations ==
The story has been adapted by many other writers, often with modifications to the ending. "Du Zichun san ru Chang'an" (杜子春三入長安; "Du Zichun enters Chang'an three times") by Feng Menglong retains much of the original plot in "Du Zichun", but allows its protagonist to successfully continue pursuing immortality after his initial setback. The Qing dynasty short story "Yangzhou meng" (揚州夢; "Dreams in Yangzhou") by Yue Duan (岳端) likewise retells "Du Zichun" but with a happy ending. In the Japanese short story "Toshishun" (1920) by Ryūnosuke Akutagawa, the protagonist fails the test but as a son grieving for his mother, who has been reborn as a horse. Moreover, both he and the Taoist priest remain optimistic about the future.
