= In Search of the Supernatural =

4th-century CE Chinese compilation of legends and stories

Cover of a 1937 printed edition of In Search of the Supernatural (volume one)

Pages from a Ming dynasty Wanli period printed edition of In Search of the Supernatural

In Search of the Supernatural (traditional Chinese: 搜神記; simplified Chinese: 搜神记; pinyin: Sōushén Jì; Wade–Giles: Sou-shên Chi; Jyutping: sau2 san4 gei3; lit. 'Record(s) of Searching for the Spirits') is a 4th-century Chinese compilation of legends, short stories, and hearsay concerning Chinese gods, ghosts, and other supernatural phenomena in the zhiguai and chuanqi styles. Although the authorship of the book is not made explicit in the text, it is believed to have been written and compiled by Gan Bao, a historian at the court of Emperor Yuan of the Jin dynasty around AD 350. It was reissued in numerous editions, including in 1593. The book usually consists of 464 stories.

The English translation by Kenneth J. DeWoskin and J. I. Crump Jr. was published in 1996. The book is also known as In Search of the Sacred and Anecdotes about Spirits and Immortals.

== Stories ==
Notable stories include:

- "Gan Jiang Mo Xie"〈干將莫邪〉
- "Wu Wang Xiao Nü"〈吳王小女〉
- "Li Ji Zhan She"〈李寄斬蛇〉a legend about serpent-slaying: Li Ji Slays the Giant Serpent (Li Chi Slays the Serpent), similar to the legend of Chen Jinggu.
- "Han Bing Fufu"〈韓憑夫婦〉

The collection also contains a variant of the story of a Swan Maiden (or Heavenly/Celestial Bride) who marries a mortal man.

== Legacy ==
Pu Songling self-deprecatingly cites Gan Bao's work as a far greater work than his own, the now famous Strange Tales from a Chinese Studio. Pu also mentioned another ancient masterwork, Liu Yiqing's You Ming Lu in his 1679 preface of Strange Tales.
