= Lieyi Zhuan =

The Lieyi Zhuan (Chinese: 列異傳, lit. "Arrayed Marvels"), dating from the late 2nd century or early 3rd century, is a collection of zhiguai, a Chinese literary genre that deals with strange (mostly supernatural) events and stories. It is attributed to Cao Pi (187-226 CE). (Note: The Book of Sui recorded that Lieyi Zhuan was written by Cao Pi. However, the collection recorded events which supposedly occurred during the Zhengshi and Ganlu eras (of Cao Fang's and Cao Mao's reigns respectively). Both Books of Tang recorded that the author was Zhang Hua instead. Qing-era scholar Yao Zhenzong (姚振宗) theorized that the collection was started by Cao Pi and then later continued/completed by Zhang Hua, but offered no evidence to support his claim.)

The work was mostly lost around the Song dynasty, with its contents scattered among collections such as Yiwen Leiju, Taiping Yulan and Taiping Guangji, etc. Pei Songzhi and Li Daoyuan also cited the work in their annotations to Records of the Three Kingdoms and Water Classic respectively.
