= This Transformation =

- Short story by Pu Songling
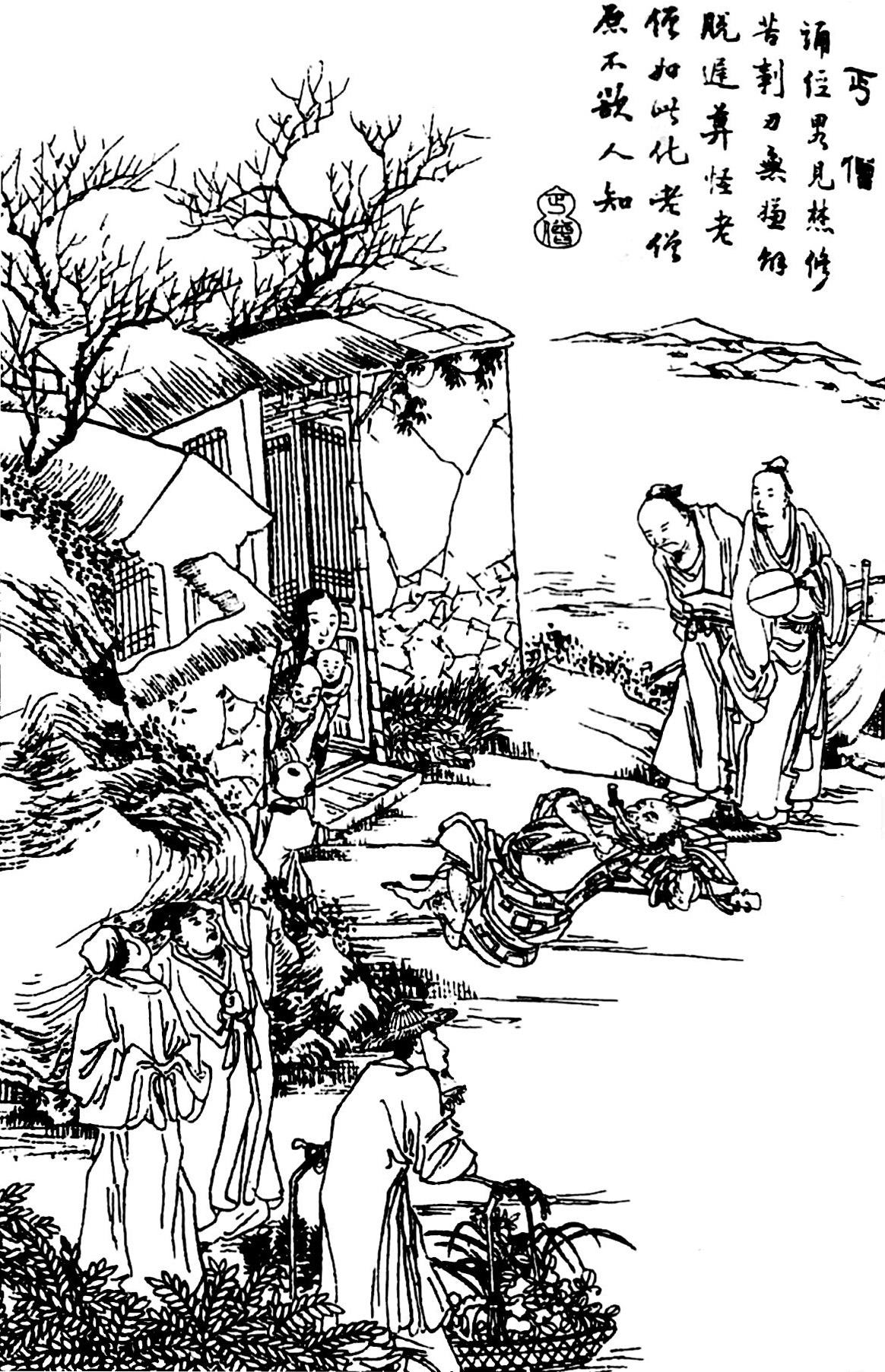
- 19th-century illustration from Xiangzhu liaozhai zhiyi tuyong (Liaozhai Zhiyi with commentary and illustrations; 1886)
- Original title: 丐僧 (Gaiseng)
- Translator: John Minford
- Country: China
- Language: Chinese
- Genre: Zhiguai

Publication
- Published in: Strange Stories from a Chinese Studio
- Publication type: Anthology
- Publication date: c. 1740
- Published in English: 2006

Chronology
胡氏	伏狐

"This Transformation", also known as "The Begging Monk", (Chinese: 丐僧; pinyin: Gaì Sēng) is a short story by Pu Songling collected in Strange Stories from a Chinese Studio (1740). The tale revolves around a monk who begs for nothing in particular and is treated like an outcast. It was first fully translated into English by John Minford in 2006, followed by Sidney L. Sondergard in 2008.

== Plot ==
A reclusive and shabby-looking monk skulks the streets of Jinan, reciting aloud sutras and begging for alms; however, he rejects everything people offer to him, be it food or water. Enquiries on the reason for such, as well as suggestions to relocate to a less-populated area, are ignored, until one day the monk angrily stresses that: "This is the transformation I'm seeking." (Note: In Chinese: "要如此化！" Sondergard offers a significantly different translation from Minford's: "I want to collect in this way!") Some time afterwards, the monk is spotted lying near the southern border, motionless to the extent of being corpse-like. The locals try to get a reaction from him, with some criticising the monk; enraged, he gets up and disembowels himself with a short knife. He is quickly buried but when his coffin is unearthed, the corpse is nowhere to be found.

== Reception ==
Sidney L. Sondergard, who included the story in the second volume of his translation of the 494 entries in Strange Tales from a Chinese Studio, suggests that it is criticizing people who are not receptive towards the feelings of others, in this case the titular "begging monk"; in real life, Pu Songling was reportedly misunderstood by many. Zhang Zhongliang concurs with this view, writing that "This Transformation" highlights the social othering suffered by beggars. A writer for Wenshi Zhishi (文史知识), a Chinese literature-based circular, compares the begging monk to a Buddhist character in Dream of the Red Chamber.
