= Tiandi yinyang jiaohuan dalefu =

Tang dynasty poem

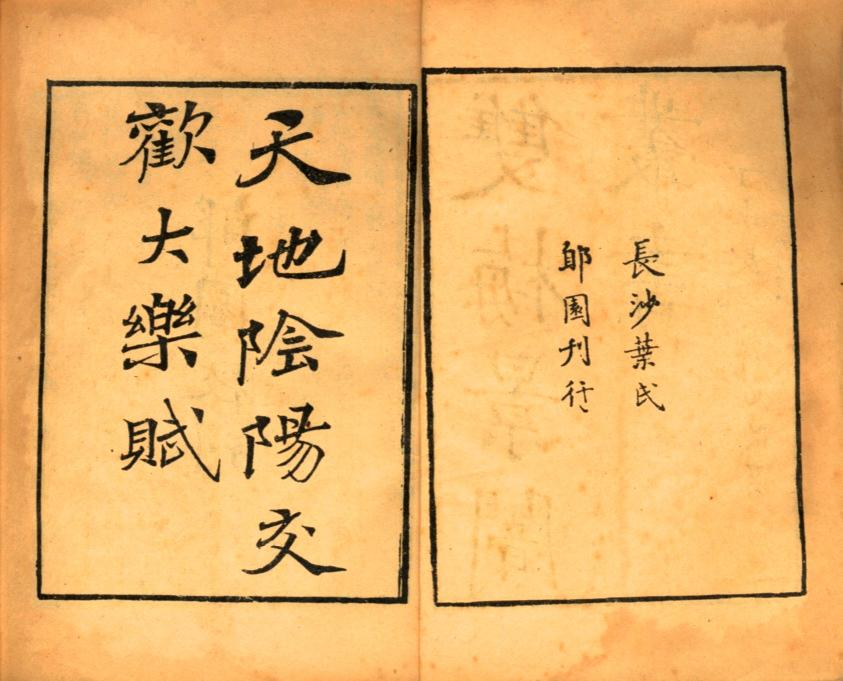
"Tiandi yinyang jiaohuan dale fu"

"Tiandi yinyang jiaohuan dalefu" (Chinese: 天地陰陽交歡大樂賦; pinyin: Tiāndì yīnyáng jiāohuān dàlèfù) (Note: Translated into English as "Poetic Essay of the Great Bliss of the Sexual Union of Heaven and Earth and Yin and Yang" or "The Heaven and Earth, Yin and Yang Songs of Great Satisfaction in Sexual Pleasure".) is a Chinese rhymed prose poem (fu) on sexual intercourse attributed to Tang poet Bai Xingjian (776–826). Although it is considered a lost work, fragments of the poem were discovered as part of the Dunhuang manuscripts by Paul Pelliot in 1908 and first published by Ye Dehui in 1914.

== Poetic structure and contents ==
They read the Canon of the Plain Girl and look at the erotic pictures on the folding screen.
Setting the folding screens around them, they lie down, reclining on the pillows.
The beautiful lady takes off her silk skirt and stitched trousers.
Her cheeks are just like a bunch of flowers,
and her waist is just like a bunch of white silk strings.

— Translation by Sumiyo Umekawa.

The poem is an example of fu, translated into English as "songs" or "description", which were often intended to be recited, rather than sung. Specifically, it is a sufu (俗賦) or "vulgar fu", the likes of which were inspired by the oral traditions of Buddhism and Taoism during the Tang dynasty. The poet writes in the preamble: "Although it takes the form of obscene talk, the idea of the song will proclaim the delightful part of human life. As joy granted to human beings, there is nothing greater than this."

The rest of the extant poem comprises 240 lines and describes fourteen forms of sexual intercourse, including coitus reservatus. It promotes heterosexual sex as the "ultimate human pleasure", while also affirming homosexual behaviour. According to Robert van Gulik, the line "they read the Canon of the Plain Girl and look at the erotic pictures ..." is evidence that illustrated sex manuals existed from the Tang dynasty at least.

== Publication history ==
The poem is attributed to poet Bai Xingjian, who was active during the Tang dynasty. It is now considered a lost literary work; Ping Yao speculates that it "must have astounded post-Tang readers so much that the text disappeared after the Tang." It remained in obscurity for centuries, until fragments of the poem were discovered as part of the Dunhuang manuscripts by Paul Pelliot in 1908 and first published by Ye Dehui in 1914.

== See also ==
- List of poems in Chinese or by Chinese poets
