= You Ming Lu =

Collection of tales

You Ming Lu (幽明录, yōu míng lù, also known as 幽冥录 and 幽冥记) is a collection of tales of the supernatural from 5th-century China, traditionally attributed to Liu Yiqing. An example of "zhiguai" ("accounts of anomalies"), these tales deal with such topics as immortals, ghosts, the afterlife, as well as Buddhist themes such as karmic retribution. The text, originally in either 20 or 30 juan (卷) according to ancient bibliographies, was lost at some point before the Northern Song dynasty of 960 to 1127, but reconstructed from citations from later works. A Qing dynasty recompilation included 158 stories, which was expanded by Lu Xun to bring the total to 265 stories.

You Ming Lu is noteworthy for being one of the earliest known works to display Buddhist influences, and as such had a strong influence on subsequent literature. Like most zhiguai collections, it includes works that had appeared in previous collections, taking 11 stories from Soushen Ji (搜神记), 4 from Lieyi Zhuan (列异传), and one or two stories from a variety of other works. A total of about 35 stories have been traced to previous works, leaving the majority of the stories in this collection as either original or of unknown provenance.

== Authorship ==
Liu Yiqing was born in Pengcheng, today's Xuzhou, during the Jin dynasty, the son of Liu Daolian (刘道憐, 368–422), Prince Jing of Changsha. He is better known as the compiler of the collection Shi Shuo Xin Yu (世说新语, A New Account of the Tales of the World), which is a quintessential work of the 志人 genre ("accounts of men"). His uncle was Liu Yu, the founding emperor of the Liu Song dynasty who reigned from 420 to 422.

Various documents liste Liu Yiqing as the author of the You Ming Lu, the first being the Book of Sui, completed in 636. However in the earlier biography of Liu in the Book of Song, completed by Shen Yue, there is no mention of his authorship of the You Ming Lu. The later work, the History of the Southern Dynasties by Li Yanshou, also contains no mention of this work by Li Yiqing. Shen Yue also noted that Liu Yiqing had "neither much talent nor many words", and modern writer Lu Xun argued that Li Yiqing was not the author of the book so much as its compiler.
