= Tatsuhiko Seo =

Japanese historian and professor (born 1952)

- Born: Missing required parameter 1=month! , 1952; Japan Hiroshima
- Other name: 妹尾 達彦
- Occupation: Chinese History

Tatsuhiko Seo (妹尾 達彦, Seo Tatsuhiko) is a Japanese historian. As of 2008 he is a professor of Chuo University's Faculty of Literature.

== Biography ==
Tatsuhiko Seo was born in 1952 in Hiroshima Prefecture. He was raised in West Tokyo. He studied at Ritsumeikan University and measured oriental studies. According to his essay, he was interested in cities when he traveled from Bangkok to London as a backpacker. He graduated in 1977, and entered the graduate school of Osaka University. When he was a student, he also studied at Shaanxi Normal University and received guidance under Shi Nianhai(史念海). In 1979 he received a master's degree from Osaka University Graduate School of Letters. In 1983, he got a qualification for submitting a dissertation at the same university.

After graduation, he became an associate professor at the Hokkaido University of Education (1983–1989). From 1989 to 2000, he was a professor at University of Tsukuba (Department for History and Anthropology). After he retired from the University of Tsukuba, he was a professor at Chuo University. Now he is a researcher at the Tōyō Bunko, Tokyo.

== Works ==
His lifework is a mechanism of two different worlds: agricultural world and Nomadic world.

Seo was the author of many books, including "The Urban Social Structure of Chang'an, 583-904"(『長安の都市計画』), in 1983.
