= Qu You =

Chinese novelist

Qu You (Chinese: 瞿佑; pinyin: Qú Yòu; Wade–Giles: Ch'ü Yu, 1341–1427), courtesy name Zongji (宗吉) and self-nicknamed Cunzhai (存齋, "Reading Studio of Existence"), was a Chinese novelist who lived in the Ming dynasty, and whose works inspired a new genre fantasy works with political subtext of the Qing dynasty.

Born in Qiantang (錢塘, now Hangzhou), Qu You was famous as an adolescent poet. He became a teacher-official (教諭) in Lin'an (臨安), then promoted to be the Head of Secretary (長史) of the Zhou (周) Kingdom. But at the height of his career, he became implicated in a dispute between the Hongwu Emperor and Zhu Su and was jailed in 1408.

After his release in 1425, he worked as a tutor in the household of Lord of Ying State (英國公). He was reinstated as an official, but he resigned shortly, never returning to the world of politics again, in action. His works, though entertaining, have undertone that expresses concerns and discontent that he had with the Zhu family and politics of the Ming dynasty.

== Works ==
- Records by the Trimmed Lamp (剪燈錄, Jiandeng Lu): 40 volumes
- New Stories to Trim the Lamp By (剪燈新話, Jiandeng Xinhua): 4 volumes
