= Taiping Guangji =

9th-century Chinese collection of writings

- Traditional Chinese: 太平廣記
- Simplified Chinese: 太平广记
- Literal meaning: Taiping ("great peace") extensive records
Transcriptions
Standard Mandarin
- Hanyu Pinyin: Tàipíng guǎngjì
- IPA: [tʰâɪ.pʰǐŋ kwàŋ.tɕî]

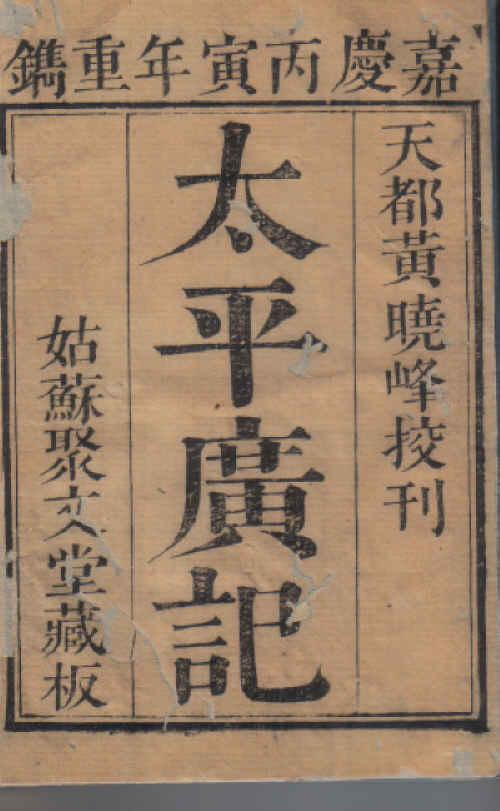
Cover of a 1566 edition of Taiping Guangji

The Taiping Guangji (Note: not to be confused with the Taiping Huanyu Ji or Taiping Yulan, which were compiled around the same era) (Chinese: 太平廣記), sometimes translated as the Extensive Records of the Taiping Era or Extensive Records of the Taiping Xingguo Period, is a collection of stories compiled under the second emperor of the Song dynasty, Taizong. The work was completed in 978, and printing blocks were cut, but it was prevented from official publication on the grounds that it contained only xiaoshuo (Note: 小说; fiction or "insignificant tellings") and thus "was of no use to students." It circulated in various manuscript copies until it was published in the Ming dynasty. It is considered one of the Four Great Books of Song (宋四大書). The title refers to the Taiping Xingguo era (Note: 太平興國; "great-peace rejuvenate-nation"; 976–984 AD), the first years of Taizong's reign.

The collection is divided into 500 volumes (卷; Juǎn) and consists of about 3 million Chinese characters. It includes 7,021 stories selected from over three hundred books and novels from the Han dynasty to the early Song dynasty, many of which have been lost. Some stories are historical or naturalistic anecdotes, each is replete with historical elements, and was not regarded by their authors as fiction, but the topics are mostly supernatural, delving into tales about Buddhist and Taoist priests, immortals, ghosts, and various deities. They include a number of Tang dynasty stories, especially chuanqi (tales of wonder), that are famous works of literature in their own right, while also being the inspiration for later works.

In the 17th century, the vernacular novelist and short story writer Feng Menglong produced an abridged edition, Taiping Guangji Chao (太平廣記鈔), reducing the number of stories to 2,500 in 80 volumes.

Pu Songling was said to have been inspired by Taiping Guangji; the short story "A Sequel to the Yellow Millet Dream" parallels one of Taiping's stories.

== Contents ==
The Taiping Guangji was compiled by Wang Kezhen (王克贞), Song Bai (宋白), Hu Meng (扈蒙), Xu Xuan (徐铉), Zhao Lingji (赵邻几), Lü Wenzhong (吕文仲), Li Fang (李昉), Li Mu (李穆), and others.

=== Translations ===
- Into the Porcelain Pillow: 101 Tales from Records of the Taiping Era, translated by Zhang Guangqian (Foreign Languages Press, 1998)
- Tales from Tang Dynasty China: Selections from the Taiping Guangji, translated by Alexei Ditter, Jessey Choo and Sarah Allen (Hackett Publishing Company, 2017).
- The Tale of Li Wa by Bai Xingjian, translated as The Story of Miss Li by Arthur Waley in More Translations from the Chinese (Alfred A. Knopf, 1919)
- The Tale of Liu Yi, translated as The Dragon King's Daughter by Yang Xianyi and Gladys Yang in The Dragon King's Daughter: Ten Tang Dynasty Stories (Foreign Languages Press, 1954)
- Huo Xiaoyu's Story by Jiang Fang, translated by Stephen Owen in An Anthology of Chinese Literature: Beginnings to 1911 (W. W. Norton & Company, 1996)

== Sources ==
- The text in Simplified characters, with translations into Modern Standard Chinese.
- Allen, Sarah M. (2014), Shifting Stories: History, Gossip, and Love in Narratives from Tang Dynasty China. Cambridge: Harvard University Press.
- Charles E. Hammond, "T'ang Legends: History and Hearsay" Tamkang Review 20.4 (summer 1990), pp. 359–82.
- Idema, Wilt and Lloyd Haft (1997). A Guide to Chinese Literature. Ann Arbor: Center for Chinese Studies, The University of Michigan. ISBN 0892641231..
- Cheng, Yizhong, "Taiping Guangji" ("Extensive Records of the Taiping Era "). Encyclopedia of China (Chinese Literature Edition), 1st ed., via archive.org.
- Kurz, Johannes. "The Compilation and Publication of the Taiping yulan and the Cefu yuangui", in Florence Bretelle-Establet and Karine Chemla (eds.), Qu'est-ce qu'écrire une encyclopédie en Chine?. Extreme Orient-Extreme Occident Hors série (2007), 39–76.
