= Zhongxian Ganbu =

Doctoral thesis

Zhongxian Ganbu (Chinese: 中县干部; pinyin: Zhōngxiàn Gànbù; lit. 'cadres in a central county') is a 2010 doctoral thesis of Feng Junqi at the Department of Sociology of Peking University. The 250,000-character Chinese-language thesis describes the political ecology of a county in central China's Henan province, based on the author's interviews with 161 local officials ranked deputy-section-head level or above during 2008–10.

The thesis draws significant public attention to nepotism in local government in China, and is often mentioned or discussed in related debates.

== Title ==
The names of places and people in the thesis are all anonymised technically. The county where the author worked is referred to as Zhongxian (Chinese: 中县; pinyin: Zhōng Xiàn; lit. 'central county') in the thesis, which means both "a county in central China" and "China miniatured in a county," according to the author himself. According to the thesis, the author was appointed temporary positions to work in Zhongxian for two years. He worked as a deputy mayor of Xicheng Township in the first year and as a magistrate assistant in the second year.

The English translation of the title is not standardised. "Cadres in Zhong Xian", "Zhongxian Cadres", "Cadres in a county of China", "Cadres of Zhongxian" are also used to referred to this thesis, in addition to its Pinyin "Zhongxian Ganbu".

== Content ==
The thesis is an anthropological work based on participant observation and critical analyses, which reveals the cadres of Zhongxian from different perspectives, indicating the employee structure, promotion strategies and their intercalations in a county-level government in China. The thesis portrays a sick political ecology where officials of lower ranks bribe those of higher ranks, government positions are for sale, and political families inherit the power generation by generation. The author notices that when a government official fails to be promoted to deputy-division-head level positions before the age of 45, he will have little chance for promotions for the rest of his life. Also, little promotion chance is given to females, who largely rely on familial connections. The formal or informal personal relationships play an important or even decisive role in promotions, where personal secretaries and office directors take advantages and are far more likely to be promoted to higher ranks.

The author believe this description reflects the status quo of all county officials in China, while newspaper China Business View suggests that the phenomena described in the thesis are China in miniature.

== Reception ==
As a doctoral thesis, the paper was highly regarded by the thesis committee. Yu Jianrong, an expert in China's rural development, states that the thesis "tells the truth of Chinese politics in county or town levels." Zheng Yefu, the doctoral advisor of the author, praised the solid, detailed investigations in the thesis.

The thesis draws significant attention to the recruitment of the local government, among both the general public and the academia, with news reports made in mainland China and beyond. Since then, it has been widely discussed and often mentioned, especially when discussing related topics, such as nepotism in China. For example, as Smith (2013) states,

In central and western China, local government is seen as a desirable form of employment, and recruitment is largely based on nepotism, a widely acknowledged fact that, to my knowledge, only one scholar has been indiscreet enough to verify empirically by examining recruitment to different county government agencies and tracing the rise of different political clans within that county (Feng 2010).

Columnist Lei Zhongzhe suggests that the conclusions in the thesis can be corroborative with isolated cases in Chinese politics, which makes a detailed diagnosis for the political system. Shaanxi-based newspaper China Business View also criticises the political families described in the thesis, arguing against the privatisation and monopolisation of the public resources by these family. The newspaper further reasons that the political ecology in the thesis will widen social divide and irritate social conflicts; thus, checks and balances should be made for the political power.

However, Cheng Haihua, a Chinese visiting scholar in the US, wrote against the methodology of the thesis in newspaper Global Times, doubting whether the undercover research can uphold ethical standards in the US and suggesting the urgent need for regulating research ethics in China.

In April 2015, as another 2010 paper by Feng, which describes how Hunan people gradually took control of China's copy industry, went viral on the Internet, the media began to look into the reasons underlying the popularity of the two theses, which is a sharp contrast to the fact that over 82% of the humanities research, including 32% of the sociology research, was never read or cited. News commentaries on different media praise the solid work and plain language used in both papers.
