= The Tale of Huo Xiaoyu =

Pages from a printed edition of Huo Xiaoyu zhuan, collected by the Harvard-Yenching Library, Harvard University

"The Tale of Huo Xiaoyu" (traditional Chinese: 霍小玉傳; simplified Chinese: 霍小玉传; pinyin: Huò Xiǎoyù zhuàn), also translated as "The Story of Huo Xiaoyu", is a chuanqi tale written by Jiang Fang (蔣防; 792–835) during the Tang dynasty.

The protagonist of the story is a Gējì named Huo Xiaoyu, who falls madly in love with a handsome young poet named Li Yi. While Li Yi was indeed a famous poet during Jiang Fang's lifetime, Huo Xiaoyu herself is a fictional character. There is also no evidence that Jiang Fang personally knew of Li Yi, or that the story is based on an actual account. The tale was famously adapted into a play by Ming dynasty playwright Tang Xianzu as Zichai ji (The Story of the Purple Jade Pin or The Purple Hairpin).

== Adaptations ==
=== Tang Xianzu ===
Ming dynasty playwright Tang Xianzu, drawing on the The Tale of Huo Xiaoyu, first adapted the story into the Kunqu drama The Tale of the Purple Flute (紫簫記). He later reworked it into The Legend of Purple Hairpin (Chinese: 紫釵記; Pinyin: Zǐ chāi jì; Jyutping: zi^{2} caai^{1} gei^{3}), revising the original tragic ending so that Li Yi and Huo Xiaoyu are finally reunited as lovers and become husband and wife.

=== Tong Tik‑sang ===
In 1956, Cantonese opera playwright Tong Tik‑sang adapted Tang Xianzu’s Ming‑dynasty drama The Purple Hairpin into a Cantonese opera of the same title, which premiered the following year at Hong Kong’s Lee Theatre.

=== Love In The Purple ===
Love In The Purple (紫釵奇緣) is a 2013 Chinese television drama series that was adapted from Tang Xianzu's The Legend of Purple Hairpin. While the TV series preserves the core premise of a romance sparked by a dropped purple hairpin, it introduces massive structural overhauls, palace politics, and completely alters the character dynamics to fit a modern television format.
