= The Governor of Nanke =

Short story by Li Gongzuo

"The Governor of Nanke" (simplified Chinese: 南柯太守传; traditional Chinese: 南柯太守傳; pinyin: Nánkē Tàishǒu Zhuàn, otherwise translated as "The Governor of the Southern Tributary State", "Governor of the Southern Branch Commandery" and variants) is a Tang dynasty Chinese chuanqi (a form of short story) by Li Gongzuo, set in the year 794. It is the basis for the similar Japanese tale "The Dream of Akinosuke".

== Summary ==
Chunyu Fen (淳于棼) is a previously successful and rich officer in the Huainan army who has offended his general and been dismissed. Disgruntled, he drank himself to sleep under a huge ash tree and was carried back to his house by two friends. While he is resting in a half-asleep state, a pair of messengers enter with an invitation from the king of "Hui An".

Chunyu goes with the messengers in their carriage, which heads towards the ash tree and into the hollow under it. The scenery in the hollow, while consisting of mountains and rivers, looks different from the world above. After about ten miles, they enter a large city though a grand gate over which is written "The Great Kingdom of Ashendon". Chunyu sees an old drinking friend of his at the side of the road, amongst other officers.

Chunyu is informed by the prime minister that the king has invited him here with the hope of him marrying one of his daughters, creating an alliance. When brought before the king, he is told that this is at his father's wish. Chunyu is bemused by this, but since his father was a missing frontier general, it is possible. At a feast that evening, Chunyu is entertained by nymphs and fairies, and meets his groomsmen and Tian Zihua, another old friend who tells him yet another friend, Zhou, is also in the city. Forthwith, he is married to the king's second daughter, a girl of about fifteen.

Chunyu and his wife come to love each other greatly, and his power grows. One day, Chunyu asks the king how his father could have made the request to the king for him to be married, as Chunyu's father has been missing for nearly twenty years. The king replies that he is in frequent contact with Chunyu's father who is still alive, and serving at the northern frontier. The king instructs Chunyu to write to his father, but not to go to see him. A reply is soon received, telling Chunyu of his father's regret that they can't meet then, but that they will meet in three years' time.

At his wife's request, Chunyu takes an official post at Nanke (a prosperous and fertile southern tributary state) where he serves as governor, with Tian Zihua as finance minister and Zhou as chief councillor. After a farewell feast and a several-day-long journey, they arrive at Nanke. Chunyu is a wise governor and the state flourishes. He has five sons, who all take official posts, and two daughters who are married into the royal family.

One day, the neighboring kingdom of "Sandalvine" invades, and Chunyu is commanded to raise an army and fight them, which he does, putting Zhou in charge of 30,000 men. However, Zhou proves a poor commander, and the battle is a rout. Zhou flees back to Nanke under cover of darkness, where Chunyu arrests him, but the king pardons both men for the defeat. The next month Zhou dies from a boil on his neck and Chunyu's wife dies shortly after that. Chunyu's request to travel back to the capital with the hearse is granted, and he is greeted there by the mourning king and queen. After his return Chunyu behaves oddly and gathers so many followers that the king begins to suspect him. Meanwhile, the king is informed of a mysterious portent that the kingdom will be destroyed by an event caused by a foreigner close to the royal family. Accordingly, the king forces Chunyu to retire.

Sensing Chunyu's feelings of despondence, the king informs him that is regretful that his wife has died so young, but now Chunyu must return home. Chunyu argues, saying that this is his home, but the king disagrees, saying that Chunyu came from the world of men. So, Chunyu returns the way he came, but this time in an old and shabby carriage. Entering his home again, he is gripped by sadness, and then is shocked to see himself lying in his bed. Suddenly he awakens, and finds that the day he fell asleep has not yet ended, despite having lived a generation in Ashendon.

He goes out with his friends and uncovers a great ants' nest under the ash tree, with two huge ants attended to by the others, with another nest nearby for Nanke, and a burial mound for his wife. A connected nest is found under a sandalwood tree overgrown with vines, showing where the invaders had come from. Chunyu forbids his friends to damage the nests and covers them again with the vines, but that night a severe storm destroys Ashendon, fulfilling the prophecy of destruction. Chunyu then remembers his friends Zhou and Tian Zihua, and sends a servant for news, to find that they are both recently dead. Realising the emptiness of the material world, Chunyu becomes a Taoist, eschews money and women, and dies three years later.

== Analysis ==
Luo notes that the story fits other tales' pattern of building up to a final "factuality", or justification for the story, in the finding of the ants' nest. Yu says that this story is similar to others such as "The World Inside a Pillow" ("Zhenzhongji") and "Cherry and the Blue Robe Maiden" ("Yingtao qingyi") in that it uses the concept of a dream as a cautionary device. Indeed, this story has led to the Chinese idiom "Nankeyimeng" (南柯一夢) to describe such an illusory dream or fantasy of grandeur, despite the emptiness of materialistic life.

=== Concept in other works ===
Many works have utilized the concept of a lifetime being lived in the space of a single dream, including the Star Trek: The Next Generation episode "The Inner Light", and Adrian Lyne's 1990 movie Jacob's Ladder.
