= Han Hong (poet) =

Chinese poet

- Traditional Chinese: 韓翃
- Simplified Chinese: 韩翃
- Literal meaning: (given name)
Transcriptions
Standard Mandarin
- Hanyu Pinyin: Hán Hóng
- Wade–Giles: Han^{1} Hung^{1}

Alternative Chinese name
- Chinese: 君平
- Literal meaning: (courtesy name)
Transcriptions
Standard Mandarin
- Hanyu Pinyin: Jūnpíng

Han Hong (dates unknown, but fl. 8th century) was a Chinese poet of the mid-Tang period. His courtesy name was Junping.

He hailed from Nanyang, and attained a jinshi degree in the imperial examination in 754, and served in several government positions. His poetry was praised by the emperor. He was included among of the "Ten Talents of the Dali Reign", and three of his poems were included in the Three Hundred Tang Poems. Books 243, 244 and 245 of the Quan Tangshi are devoted to his poetry.

== Biography ==
The year of his birth is not known, but he came from Nanyang (modern-day Xiuwu County, Henan Province). He attained a jinshi degree in the imperial examination in 754, and worked in various government positions including jia bu lang jung zhi zhi gao (simplified Chinese: 驾部郎中知制诰; traditional Chinese: 駕部郎中知制誥; pinyin: jià bù láng zhōng zhī zhì gào) and zhong shu she ren (simplified Chinese: 中书舍人; traditional Chinese: 中書舍人; pinyin: zhōng shū shè rén).

== Poetry ==
He was one of the "Ten Talents of the Dali Reign" (simplified Chinese: 大历十才子; traditional Chinese: 大曆十才子; pinyin: Dàlì Shí Cáizǐ). Three of his poems were included in the Three Hundred Tang Poems. A Ming-era editor compiled an anthology of his poetry called the Han Junping Ji (simplified Chinese: 韩君平集; traditional Chinese: 韓君平集; pinyin: Hán Jūnpíng-jí; lit. 'Han Junping Anthology').

He had a strong linguistic sense and used simple vocabulary to produce highly evocative poetry. One example cited by Ueki et al. is the first part of his poem "Han Shi", which describes the capital during the Cold Food Festival, and was strongly appreciated by Emperor Dezong of Tang:

Traditional	Simplified	Pinyin
春城無處不飛花， 寒食東風禦柳斜。	春城无处不飞花， 寒食东风御柳斜。	chūn chéng wú chǔ bù fēi huā, hán shí dōng fēng yù liǔ xié.

Another good example cited by Ueki et al. is the following passage from a lüshi which he sent to an associate:

Traditional	Simplified	Pinyin
蟬聲驛路秋山裏， 草色河橋落照中。	蝉声驿路秋山里， 草色河桥落照中。	chán shēng lǐ yù qiū shān lǐ, cǎo sè hé qiáo luò zhào zhōng.

This passage was highly praised by later Song dynasty critics as an example of a farewell poem.

== Portrayals in later literature ==
He was featured as the protagonist in Xu Yaozuo's romantic novel Liu-shi Zhuan.

== Works cited ==
- Ueki, Hisayuki; Uno, Naoto; Matsubara, Akira (1999). "Shijin to Shi no Shōgai (Kan Kō)". In Matsuura, Tomohisa (ed.). Kanshi no Jiten 漢詩の事典 (in Japanese). Vol. 1. Tokyo: Taishūkan Shoten. pp. 104, 753. OCLC 41025662.
