= The Tale of Miss Ren =

- Short story by Shen Jiji
- Original title: 任氏傳
- Language: Chinese

Publication
- Publication date: c. 781

"The Tale of Miss Ren" (Chinese: 任氏傳; pinyin: Rén Shì Zhuàn; also translated into English as "The Story of Lady Jen" or "Miss Jen") is a Chinese supernatural tale by Shen Jiji (c. 800). The story tells of the romance between a man and a fox-fairy who takes the form of a beautiful woman.

== Plot ==
Wei Yin and Cheng were friends, and cousins, who were always together and were both fond of wine and beautiful women. Although they spent so much of their lives together, they had very different personalities and views on life which became apparent when Cheng married. In the middle of one summer, Cheng came across a beautiful woman accompanied by 2 handmaidens. The beautiful lady was "dressed in white and of an enchanting beauty". He was captured by her otherworldly looks and offered his donkey for her to ride, saying that a beautiful girl like herself should not have to walk. They became engrossed in conversation for so long that Cheng wound up at a large mansion that night, where the lady, named Miss Ren, lived. Miss Ren asked Cheng to wait a moment while she went inside to prepare something for him. After being invited in, they feasted and drank several goblets of wine and lay together that night.

After leaving the next morning, Cheng could not get the beautiful Miss Ren off his mind. As he was traveling home through a neighboring village he asked about the mansion he has just come from; according to the local proprietor no such mansion existed in that area, only a gate and broken down walls. Cheng could hardly believe this as he had spent the night at this wonderful place and he told the proprietor such. The proprietor suspected that it was the local fox spirit, who liked to beguile men into staying the night with her. After several weeks had passed without his spotting the lady again, Cheng finally stumbled across her in the market place. She knew that Cheng had figured out her secret and was shocked that he would seek her out again. Cheng professed his love for her and proclaimed that he would take care of her and find her a place to live if she would marry him. After some convincing, Miss Ren agreed.

Not long after their marriage, Cheng's cousin Wei Yin met Miss Ren; he didn't believe at first that his cousin had found such a beautiful woman to be his wife. Because of his disbelief, he went to Cheng's house to see his new bride one day after Cheng had left. Stunned by her beauty, Wei Yin tried to make a move on Miss Ren and intended to rape her. Miss Ren fought against him but was too weak to break free of his hold, so instead she asked him to hold off for just a moment and became very sad. When asked why she looked so upset, Miss Ren said it was because she felt bad for Cheng because she was all that he has in life that was nice while Wei Yin was rich and had had many beauties; if Wei Yin were to take her as well, Cheng would be left with nothing. This brought Wei to his senses and he apologized to Miss Ren.

After this misunderstanding, the two became close and often spent time together. Miss Ren also pulled strings to get a nice wife for Wei because of his honorable actions but he was never satisfied. Miss Ren would try to help both men by bribing families to get new women for Wei and to make more money for Cheng. Because of Ren's frequent advice, Cheng was able to secure a nice position in work and get a good deal on a blemished imperial horse. However, although Miss Ren had proven to be insightful and powerful, Cheng was hesitant to take her word on matters whereas Wei Yin never questioned her methods.

Cheng had obtained a lawful wife during this time but wanted to bring Miss Ren to his new post; at first Miss Ren refused and stated that a shamaness had told her that it would be unlucky for her if she were to travel west during that time of year. Cheng wouldn't take no for an answer and Miss Ren was forced to pack up and begin travelling west with Cheng to his new post. Not long after their journey started, the group came across several hunting dogs in the area. Because of this, Miss Ren turned into her true form (a fox) and took off into the fields to try to flee from the dogs. She was unfortunately unsuccessful and was killed by the hounds.

Cheng was greatly upset that Miss Ren had been killed thanks to his foolishness, and so he spent his own money to give her a proper burial and erected a grave marker to her. When he returned home, Wei Yin asked to see Miss Ren only to be informed by Cheng that she had been killed by hunting hounds. Wei Yin couldn't understand how some dogs, even though fierce, were able to kill a human. This is when Cheng revealed Miss Ren's true nature as a fox-fairy to his cousin, who in disbelief travelled to her grave to dig up her body and see for himself that she was indeed a fox.

The story ends there with a brief look into Cheng's future, which turned out to be wealthy and prosperous.

== Legacy ==
Shen JiJi's Renshi zhuan is thought to have invented the 'fox romance' genre, and as such influenced works such as the Liaozhai Zhiyi; it was popular during the Ming Dynasty and Qing Dynasty, and was included several compilations including the Yu Chu zhi (虞初志), and Taiping Guangji (太平廣記).

== Background Information ==
Female fox spirits were a popular narrative in Pre-Modern Chinese literature (and still is to this day). Because ideal women from those times were described as enchantingly beautiful and clever it was easy to combine that with the cunning nature of foxes to create this incredibly enchanting women who were sly and hard to keep. Many of these stories follow the narrative of the fox women seducing men for their needs and lives, the story of Miss Ren if incredibly different. Although Miss Ren (also stylized as Miss Ren) portrayed some of the typical aspects of fox folks (beauty, magic, seduction) she was not dangerous or out to harm anyone. She protected her chastity against her husband's cousin and did her best to use her charms and powers to benefit both her husband and her husband's cousin.

== Analysis ==
This story was beautifully written and had many different aspects from typical supernatural stories from Pre-Modern Chinese literatures. It is because of these differences that make this such a timeless and popular piece. The narrative also leaves room for the audience to interpret different avenues in the story. Why didn't Cheng take his Miss Ren's warning about her impending doom when all he previous advise had come true and benefited him? It may have been that because he knew she was not a mortal, he assumed that no harm would come to her even though he never asked her the true extent of her powers and knowledge. Also, did Wei Yin keep rejecting the women that Ren found for him because he was in love with her? Whereas Cheng treated her as a normal human and gave no thoughts to her powers (even though he knew she was not human) Wei Yin held Ren in high regards and always heeded her words even though he did not know of her true nature while she was live. Would Wei have been a better husband for Ren? Would she have lived longer if she hadn't married Cheng? It's hard to say, but we can interpret our own meanings and intentions from the narrative.
