= Bai Xingjian =

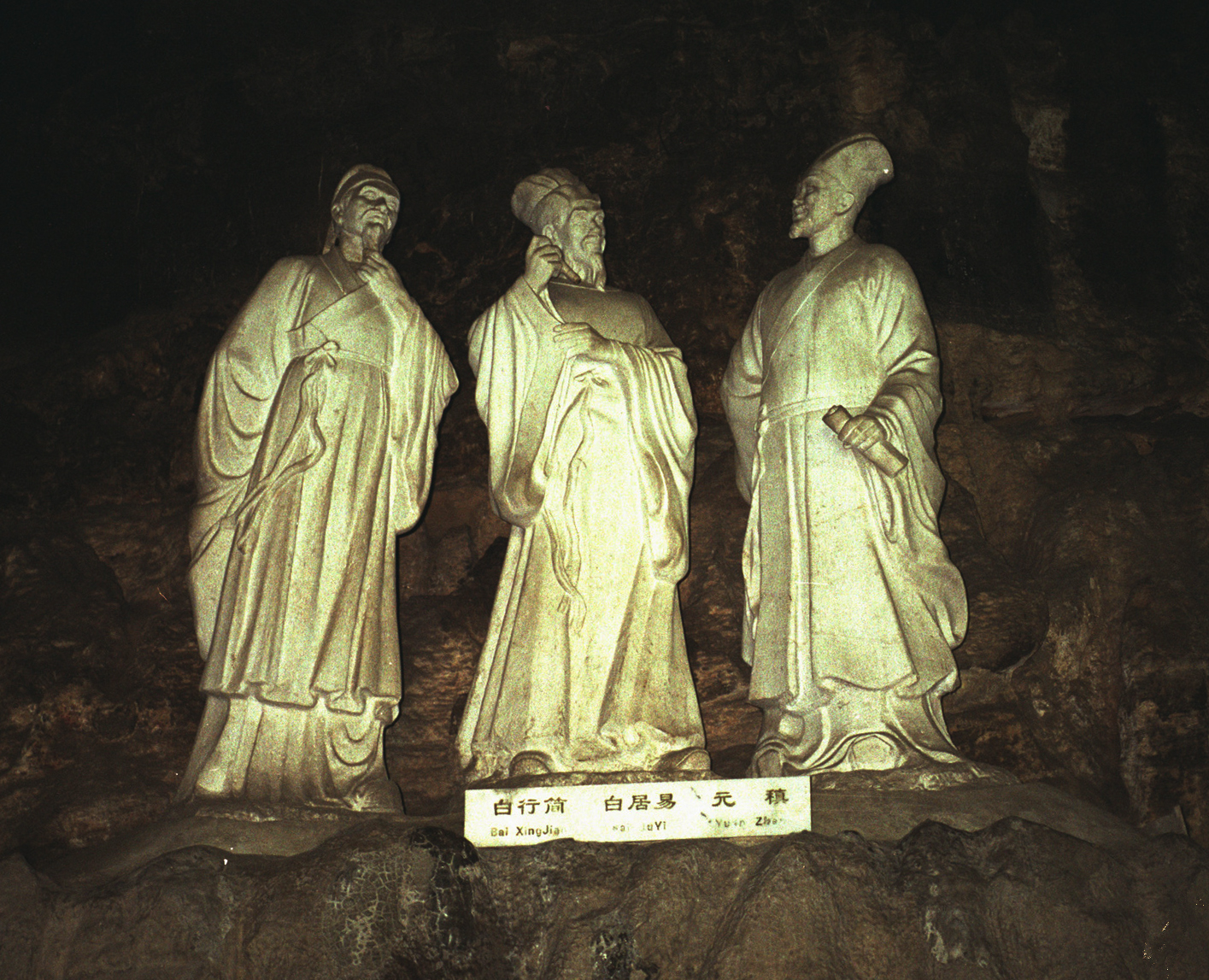
Statues of Bai Xingjian, Bai Juyi and Yuan Zhen in Yichang, Hubei, China.

Bai Xingjian (simplified Chinese: 白行简; traditional Chinese: 白行簡; pinyin: Bái Xíngjiǎn or Bó Xíngjiǎn; Wade–Giles: Pai Hsing-chien or Po Hsing-chien, 776–826) was a Chinese novelist, poet, and short story writer. He was a younger brother of the famed poet Bai Juyi.

One of his most famous works is the novella The Tale of Li Wa. It has been translated into English many times:

- by Arthur Waley in More Translations from the Chinese (1919) — as "The Story of Miss Li".
- by Yang Xianyi and Gladys Yang in The Dragon King's Daughter: Ten T'ang Dynasty Stories (1962) — as "Story of a Singsong Girl".
- by Glen Dudbridge in The Tale of Li Wa: Study and Critical Edition of a Chinese Story from the Ninth Century (1983).

It was also translated into many other languages, for example German by Franz Kuhn and French by André Lévy. He is also believed to have written the poem "Tiandi yinyang jiaohuan dalefu".
