= Li Gongzuo =

Chinese writer

Li Gongzuo (Chinese: 李公佐; pinyin: Lǐ Gōngzuǒ; Wade–Giles: Li Kung-tso, c. 778–848) was a Chinese writer from Lanzhou during the Tang dynasty. He wrote The Governor of Nanke (南柯太守傳).
