= The World Inside a Pillow =

Tang dynasty story by Shen Jiji

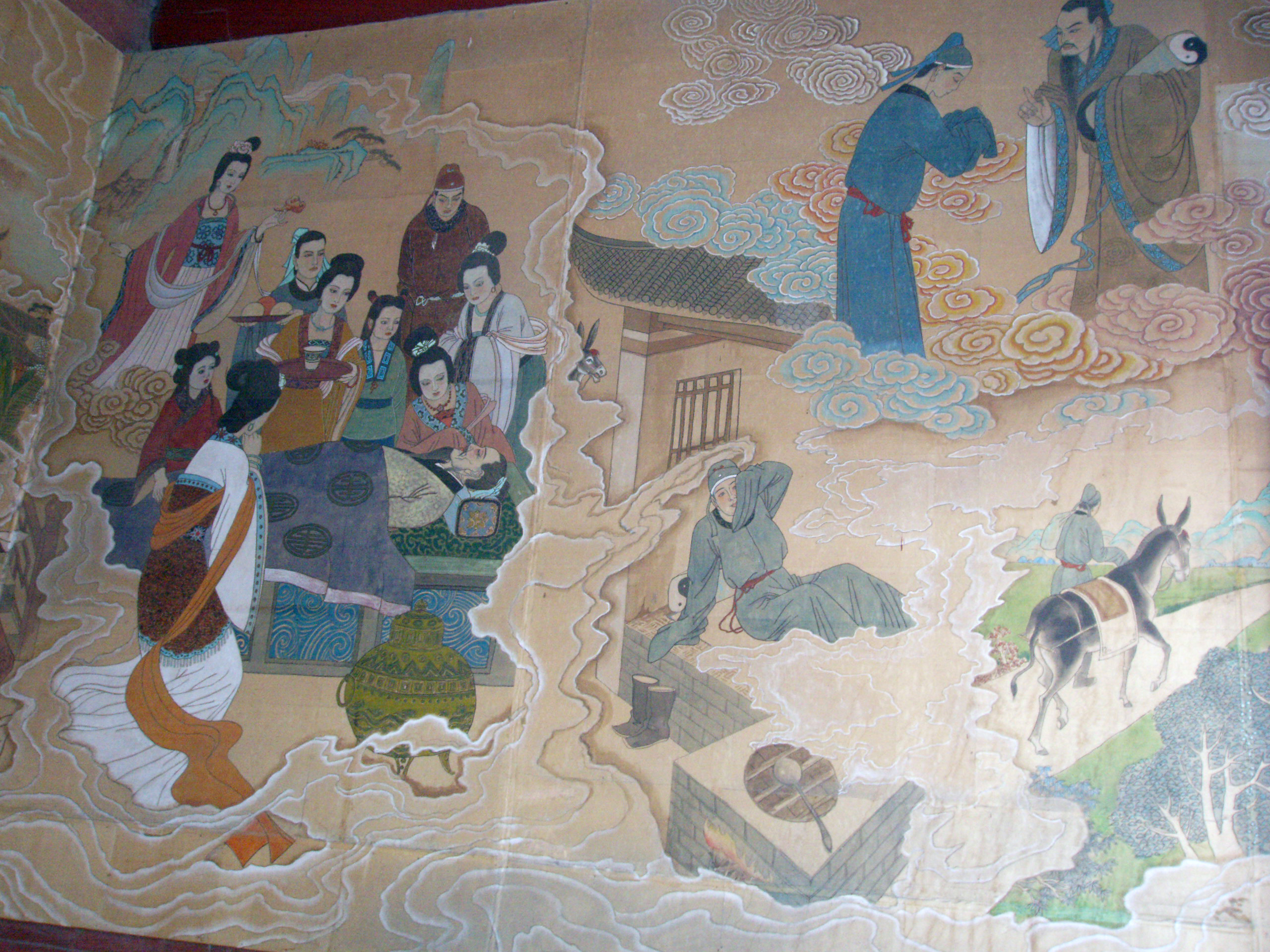

"The World Inside a Pillow" (Chinese Simplified: 枕中记) is a traditional Chinese story by Shen Jiji of the Tang dynasty (A.D. 618–907). The story involves a Daoist monk and is interpreted through the Daoist and Buddhist belief of life as an illusion and the moral of not striving too much in one's life.

== Plot ==
The story begins with a Daoist monk called Lü travelling when he meets a man named Lu at an inn. This man is unhappy with his life and laments that he was a great man born at the wrong time. The monk responds asking him if his life is not happy then whose life could possibly be happy. Lu monologues that a good and happy life ought to have a certain level of prestige, wealth, and glory. The monk offers Lu a blue porcelain pillow on which to sleep. The pillow had an opening on each end. While the owner of the inn begins cooking a meal of yellow millet, Lu falls asleep.

While the man slept he entered the pillow. Inside the pillow the man was married to a beautiful wife from a wealthy family and became quite rich. He was appointed to be chancellor to the emperor during a time of war, as well. But soon afterwards his colleagues became jealous and started spreading rumors that Lu was a traitor; the rumors caused an edict that he should be imprisoned. Upon his capture he told his wife that he had been afflicted to have wanted such a large salary that he should deserve such a fate. He grew old inside the pillow and upon his dying breath wrote a memorandum about his life and divine fate explaining that his strife was in vain.

When he died an old man inside the pillow he then awoke in an inn with the Daoist monk. The meal of yellow millet is not yet ready. Lu proclaims that it may have been a dream and the monk responds that "the happinesses of human life are all like that."

== Themes ==
The Tang dynasty was an open system with many religious influences including Buddhism and Daoism. The Daoists believe in wu wei (inaction) and not striving to gain fortune, wealth, or status. This theme is evident in the moral of The World Inside a Pillow as the man Lu realizes that all of his strife was in vain. This theme also relates to Buddhist concepts of letting go of attachments and ceasing craving, which also has traces in the story. According to John Hawley the story is a formulaic dream tale in which a religious teacher (Buddhist or Daoist) causes a mortal person to become enlightened through some type of dream.

This story gives rise to the idiom of the "yellow millet dream", which is used to describe unrealistic pipe dreams.

== Other related works ==
"The Governor of Nanke" is a work that was regarded by the Chinese literary critic Lu Xun as a superior dream tale to "The World Inside a Pillow". The story was written in a similar time frame (also during the Tang dynasty) and follows a similar story method in which the mortal falls asleep and the lines between dream and reality are blurred.

The episode "Puhoy" of the American animated television series Adventure Time explores a similar story line when the show's main character Finn builds a giant pillow fort. While seemingly fallen asleep in it and dreaming, he ends up in a magical pillow world where he marries a pillow woman, grows old with a family and eventually dies. Unlike in the Chinese story, Finn later doesn't retain any memories of the happy life he experienced.
