= Shang Zhongxian =

Chinese playwright

Shang Zhongxian (simplified Chinese: 尚仲贤; traditional Chinese: 尚仲賢; pinyin: Shàng Zhòngxián; Wade–Giles: Shang Chung-hsien) was a playwright of the Yuan dynasty in the thirteenth century who composed several zaju plays.

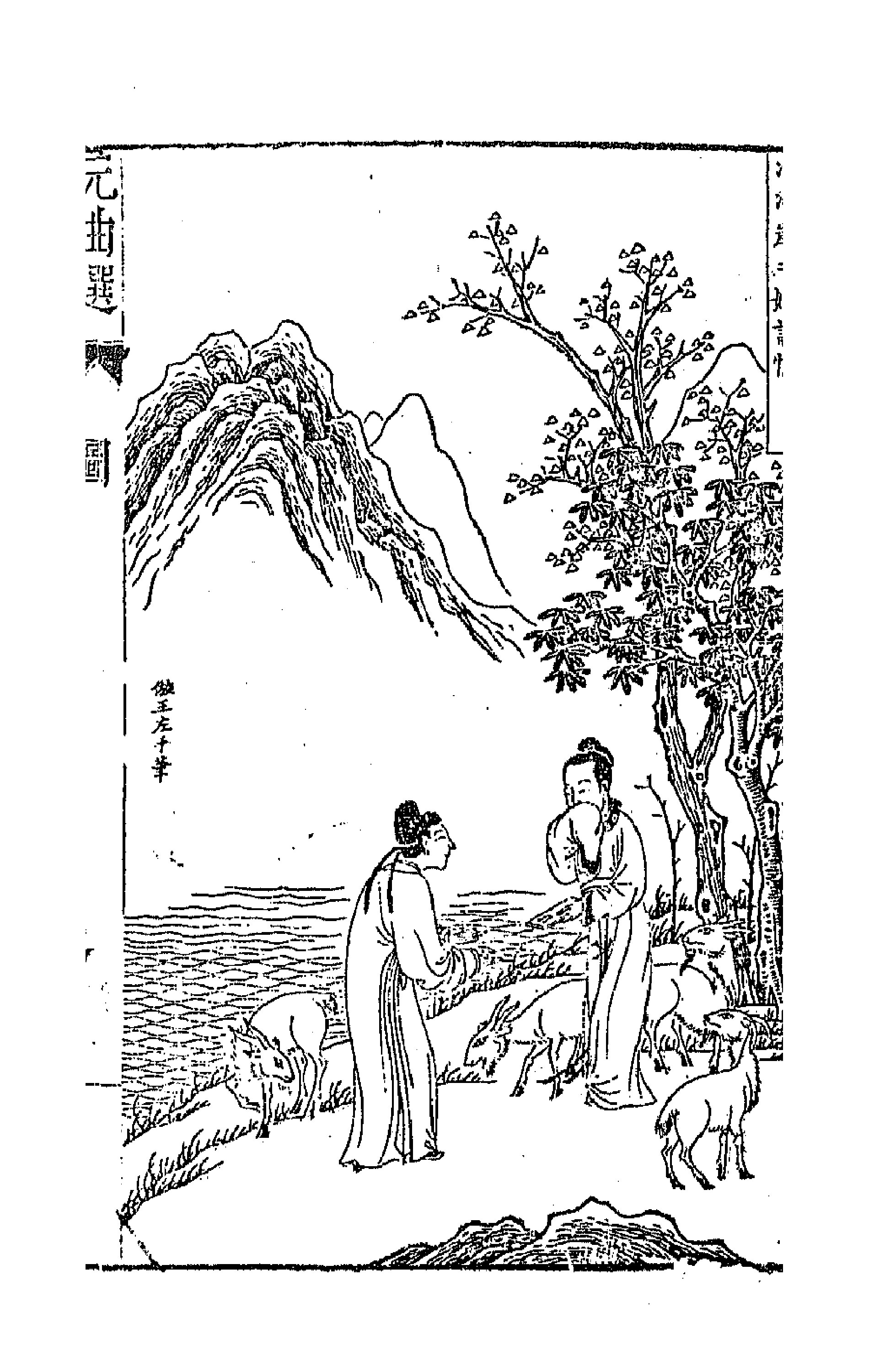
Liu Yi encounters the Dragon Girl on the bank of the Jing River. Illustration from a 1615 anthology of zaju plays which includes Shang Zhongxian's stage adaptation.

== Works ==
Among his surviving works (with their short titles) are Liu Yi chuan shu (柳毅传书), Qi Ying Bu (气英布), and the plays about the general Yuchi Gong, San duoshuo (三夺槊) and Danbian duoshuo (单鞭夺槊).

These plays are included in various collections of Yuan drama, among them Yuanqu xuan (元曲选) and Yuanqu xuan waibian (元曲选外编), which were published by Zhonghua Shuju in the 1950s.

The plays about Yuchi Gong refer to historical events from the time of the Tang general Yuchi Gong 尉迟恭 (585–658), while Liu Yi chuan shu is based on an older legend in which a scholar rescues a dragon princess.

Not much reliable information about Shang Zhongxian's personal life has been preserved.

== Works ==
The Hanyu da zidian f.e. is using the following editions:

- Yuchi Gong san duoshuo (尉迟恭三夺槊 / abb. San duoshuo 三夺槊), in Yuanqu xuan waibian, Zhonghua Shuju 1959
- Dongtinghu Liu Yi chuanshu (洞庭湖柳毅传书 / abb. Liu Yi chuanshu 柳毅传书), in Yuanqu xuan, Zhonghua Shuju 1958
- Han gaohuang zhuozu qi Ying Bu (汉高皇濯足气英布 / abb. Qi Ying Bu 气英布), in Yuanqu xuan, Zhonghua Shuju 1958
- Yuchi Gong danbian duoshuo (尉迟恭单鞭夺槊 / abb. Danbian duoshuo 单鞭夺槊), in Yuanqu xuan, Zhonghua Shuju 1958

== Bibliography ==
- David Hawkes: Liu Yi and the Dragon Princess: A Thirteenth-Century Zaju Play by Shang Zhongxian. 2003
- Alfred Forke: Chinesische Dramen der Yüan-Dynastie : 10 nachgelassene Übersetzungen. Sinologica Coloniensia 6. Martin Gimm (ed.). Wiesbaden: Franz Steiner Verlag, 1978, pp. 1–39 ("Der Zorn des Ying Pu")
