= The Tale of Li Wa =

Short novella by Bai Xingjian

A Ming dynasty Wanli era printed copy of The Tale of Li Wa

The Tale of Li Wa (traditional Chinese: 李娃傳; simplified Chinese: 李娃传; pinyin: Lǐ Wá Zhuàn; Wade–Giles: Li Wa Chuan) is a short novella by Chinese writer Bai Xingjian (or Bo Xingjian) during the Tang dynasty.

Song Geng (C: 宋耕, P: Sòng Gēng) wrote that this was one of three Tang dynasty works that were "particularly influential in the development of the caizi-jiaren model". There is a poem by Yuan Zhen, "The Ballad of Li Wa," that is a companion to the novel.

It was translated into English by Arthur Waley, who used the title The Story of Miss Li and included it on pages 113–36 in the collection More Translations from the Chinese, which was published in 1919 by Alfred A. Knopf. It was also translated into English by Glen Dudbridge, who used the title The Tale of Li Wa: Study and Critical Edition of a Chinese Story from the Ninth Century. This version was published in 1983 by Ithaca Press.

The story was also translated in Wang Chi-chen, Traditional Chinese Tales (New York: Greenwood, 1944, 1976), pp. 61–74.

Linda Rui Feng of the University of Toronto wrote that the novel features the "unpredictability and unintelligibility" of Chang'an and a conflict between "career accomplishment" and "youthful transgressions".

== Development ==
There is a debate over two possibilities of how the story evolved. One group believes that in 795 three friends told the story amongst one another. Another position states that a professional storyteller had performed in front of Bai Xingjian and Bai Juyi, and Yuan Zhen, and that Bai Xingjian obtained the story from the storyteller. One author, Tatsuhiko Seo, believes that the story comes from a storyteller.

== Plot ==
The story involves a tribute student (a provincial examinee), Zheng, trying to get the affections of Li Wa, a famous courtesan or prostitute in Chang'an. The protagonist spends his money on Li Wa and neglects his studying for the imperial examinations. He lives with Li Wa for two years and spends all of his money, which is ultimately exhausted. Li Wa is not the only aspect obstructing Student Zheng from his studies. There are portions of the story that, as written by Feng, are "devoted to a world without her, in fact, takes on an impetus and logic all of its own".

After Zheng can no longer pay the brothel costs, Li Wa abandons him, as does her madam. Student Zheng begins working at a funeral parlor as a dirge singer and at one point is the winner of a singing competition. The student's father discovers him while visiting Chang'an and severely beats him, as he is upset that his son is in this condition. The father leaves the son for dead, disowning him. Later Li Wa encounters the protagonist, who is now a beggar. She helps him recover his health, reconcile with his father, and study for the examinations. The father exclaims that he and his son are "father and son as before" (C: 父子如初, P: fùzǐ rúchū, W: fu-tzu ju-ch'u) when they reconcile. Student Zheng remains devoted to Li Wa and the two marry.

== Characters ==
- Zheng (T: 鄭, S: 郑, P: Zhèng, W: Cheng) – A tribute student (a provincial examinee), Zheng is trying to get the affections of Li Wa. In the original story Student Zheng is only known by his family name and his hometown, Xingyang, Henan. In the related plays the male is given a full name, Zheng Yuanhe (T: 鄭元和, S: 郑元和, W: Cheng Yüan-ho). At the time he arrives in Chang'an he is 20 years old, the age of adulthood.
- Li Wa (C: 李 娃, P: Lǐ Wá, W: Li Wa) is a courtesan or prostitute in Chang'an. She is the title character.
  - In the essay "The Background and Status of Li Wa" Dudbridge argued that she "holds up the standard of morality to those who should be her moral superiors" as she changes into a "maternal authority" from a courtesan, and Nienhauser stated that she "prepares Mr. Zheng for his own transformation". In the same section Dudbridge compares her to youwu (C: 尤物, P: yóuwù, W: yu-wu "extraordinary beautiful women").

== Analysis ==
S-C Kevin Tsai wrote that the critical literature usually reaches "conclusions that do not depart far from the conventional, May-Fourth-derived reading of the story as resistance against oppression" and that "The majority of Chinese literary criticism focusing on gender in the "Tale of Li Wa" generally does not depart far from this conclusion". In Tanren Chuanqi (唐人传奇/唐人傳奇), a book published in Taipei in 1990 by Sanmin shuju, Wu Zhida (吴志达/吳志達) stated that The Tale of Li Wa is "a victory song against the aristocratic marriage institution".

Glen Dudbridge's monograph The Tale of Li Wa, Study and Critical Edition of a Chinese Story from the Ninth Century includes annotations to provide understanding for Western readers. He wrote an article named "A Second Look at Li Wa zhuan" defending his method of providing annotations.

Some scholars who study the culture of the Tang dynasty perceive the story as, in the words of Tsai, "a relatively straightforward storehouse of social data; for instance, some study the tale for the detailed descriptions of capital city life in the tale." Scholars focusing on the philology include Bian Xiaoxuan (卞孝萱), Dai Wangshu, Wang Meng'ou (王梦鸥/王夢鷗), Zhang Zhenglang (张政烺/張政烺), and Zhou Shaoliang (周绍良/周紹良). Nienhauser stated that Wang Meng'ou's Tangren xiaoshuo jiaoshi is the best modern annotation of "Li Wa zhuan"" and that "Dudbridge's resonances are often measured against" Tangren xiaoshuo jiaoshi (唐人小說校釋/唐人小说校释).

Bian Xiaoxuan and Liu Kairong (刘开荣/劉開榮) believe the work is a roman à clef. Accordingly, they attempted to figure out what the allegory and the identity of the basis of Student Zheng were.

== Audiences ==
Nienhauser wrote that "While the exact constituency of [contemporary Tang Dynasty readers] cannot be determined, Bo Xingjian (and other tale writers) clearly targeted those members of the Tang elite who were themselves active in literature, men who obviously could recognize even the most erudite allusion." Nienhauser explained that "the inner audience-perhaps the primary audience" of the story consisted of men taking the Tang dynasty imperial examinations.

As of 2007, modern audiences include Chinese readers and Western sinologists. The latter, according to Nienhauser, are "aided by various databases that may allow (even encourage) over-reading of resonances. " He added that "The modern Chinese audience shares this potential."

== Legacy ==
There have been dramas made based on "The Tale of Li Wa." There is a farce, A Noontime Dream in the Garden Grove, which portrays a dispute between Li Wa and Oriole, the female protagonist of The Story of the Western Wing.
