= Zhiguai xiaoshuo =

Ancient Chinese literary genre

- Traditional Chinese: 志怪小說
- Simplified Chinese: 志怪小说
Transcriptions
Standard Mandarin
- Hanyu Pinyin: zhìguài xiǎoshuō
- IPA: [ʈʂɻ̩̂.kwâɪ ɕjàʊʂwó]

Zhiguai xiaoshuo, translated as "tales of the miraculous", "tales of the strange", or "records of anomalies", is a type of Chinese literature which appeared in the Han dynasty and developed after the fall of the dynasty in 220 CE and in the Tang dynasty in 618 CE. They were among the first examples of Chinese fiction and deal with the existence of the supernatural, rebirth and reincarnation, gods, ghosts, and spirits.

Robert Ford Campany sees the genre loosely characterized in its early examples by relatively brief form, often only a list of narrations or description, written in non-rhyming classical prose with a "clear and primary" focus on things which are anomalous, with a Buddhist or Taoist moral. Campany, however, does not see the stories as "fiction", since the literati authors believed that their accounts were factual. Lydia Sing-Chen Chiang suggests that one function of the stories in this genre was to provide a "context by which the unknown may be ascribed names and meanings and therefore become 'known,' controlled, and used."

== History and examples ==
Zhiguai (records of the strange) began developing at the end of the Han dynasty. The term zhiguai is an allusion to a passage in the inner chapters of the Zhuangzi.

During the Six Dynasties, xian were a common subject of zhiguai stories. They often had "magical" Tao powers including the abilities to "walk...through walls or stand...in light without casting a shadow".

The early 4th century anthology Soushen Ji edited by Gan Bao is the most prominent early source, and contains the earliest versions of a number of Chinese folk legends, among them versions of the ghost princess narrative. Later, tales of Indian origins were included and used for spreading Buddhist concepts, such as reincarnation. Another of the richest early collections is You Ming Lu, edited by Liu Yiqing (Chinese: 劉義慶, 403-444), who also compiled A New Account of the Tales of the World. In the Tang dynasty, distinction between the zhiguai and chuanqi (strange stories) became increasingly blurred, and there is disagreement over the boundary between the two. Many stories of both types were preserved in the 10th century anthology Taiping guangji (Extensive Records of the Taiping Era).

By the late Ming and early Qing dynasties, the collections of zhiguai and chuanqi materials had been widely reprinted and supplemented by contemporary works. Judith Zeitlin suggests that the accounts of the strange "inevitably began to lose their sense of novelty and to seem stereotype..." and such writers as Pu Songling therefore needed to renew the category of "strange". His anomalous collection of short pieces Strange Stories from a Chinese Studio, which amalgamated zhiguai features with other styles, was left unfinished at his death in 1715. Its thematic elements include ghosts, romances, spirits, uncanny dreams, and karma.

In the 21st century, zhiguai stories continue to appear in print and on screen. A recent collection, for example, Zhiguai: Chinese True Tales of the Paranormal and Glitches in the Matrix, edited by Yi Izzy Yu and John Yu Branscum, offers examples of the creative nonfiction stream of zhiguai and connects them to the more-recent genre of glitch-in-the-matrix tales.
