= Wutong =

Wutong may refer to:

== Mythology ==
- Wutong Shen, a group of five sinister deities from southern China
  - The Wutong Spirits, a Strange Tales from a Chinese Studio story based on the Wutong Shen
  - Another Wutong Spirit, another Strange Tales story

== Plants ==
- Firmiana simplex, or the Chinese parasol tree
- Platanus × hispanica, known in China as the French wutong, or simply wutong

== Places ==
- Wutong, Yongzhou (Chinese: 梧桐街道), a subdistrict and the seat of Lengshuitan District in Yongzhou City, China
- Wutong, Tongxiang, a subdistrict and the seat of Tongxiang City in Zhejiang Province, China
- Wutong Mountain (Chinese: 梧桐山), a mountain in Shenzhen, Guangdong Province, China
