= Another Wutong Spirit =

- Short story by Pu Songling
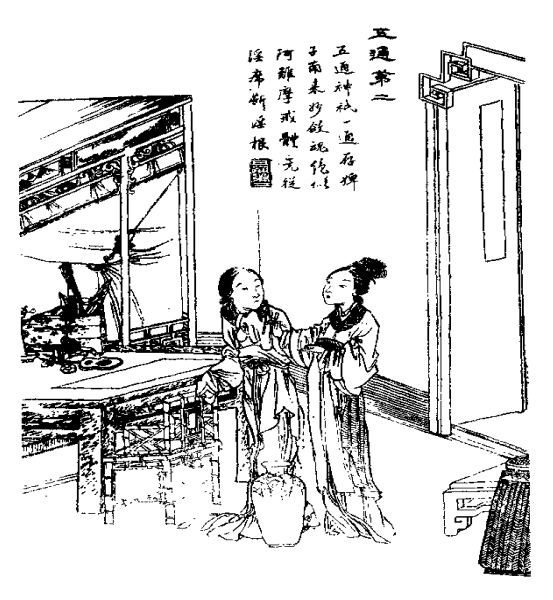
- 19th-century illustration from Xiangzhu liaozhai zhiyi tuyong (Liaozhai Zhiyi with commentary and illustrations; 1886)
- Original title: 又 (You)
- Translator: Sindney Sondergard (2008)
- Country: China
- Language: Chinese
- Genres: Zhiguai; Chuanqi; Short story

Publication
- Published in: Strange Tales from a Chinese Studio
- Media type: Print (Book)
- Publication date: 1740

Chronology
The Wutong Spirits (五通)	Shenshi (申氏)

"Another Wutong Spirit" (Chinese: 又; pinyin: Yòu) is a short story by Pu Songling first published in Strange Tales from a Chinese Studio and whose titular antagonist first appears in another Strange Tales story titled "The Wutong Spirits". In "Another Wutong Spirit", a scholar falls in love with a dragon princess and enlists her help to get rid of a sinister spirit tormenting his niece.

== Plot ==
A Suzhou scholar named Jin (金) is visited one night by a beautiful lady named Xia (霞) and her housemaid. Lady Xia offers to keep Jin company but he declines because he is both fearful that she might be a demon and worried that his reputation would suffer if she were a neighbour's daughter instead. After the housemaid takes her leave of her mistress, Lady Xia cajoles Jin into making love with her. The maid later returns to fetch her and the duo exit into the forest; henceforth, Lady Xia visits Jin nightly. One night, Jin tries to stalk her home, by following the light emitted from her luminescent pearl bracelets, but she manages to shake him off her tail.

While en route to Huaibei on horseback, Jin's horse harness comes loose just as he is approaching the Huai River. A violent wind then knocks him off balance, throwing him into the river where he loses consciousness. He awakens to find himself at the other end of the river and his horse harness as good as new. At night, Jin is rebuked by Lady Xia for insinuating that she had orchestrated the strange incident; he decides to confide in her about his niece, who is married but under the influence of a Wutong spirit.

Lady Xia suggests that the spirit might one of her father's slaves, and promises to intercede on Jin's behalf. The following night, Xia's housemaid tracks the Wutong spirit down and castrates him. Thereafter, Jin does not hear from his lover for close to a year; he decides to close his school near the Huai River and return to his hometown. As he is leaving for good, the lady suddenly returns to bid him a proper farewell. She reveals that her father is the Golden Dragon King (金龙大王); whereas her maid took the fall for castrating the Wutong spirit, Lady Xia is now attended to by an elderly servant and no longer can move about as freely as before. Nonetheless, she tells Jin that they are fated to be together and that they will be reunited in three decades.

Some three decades later, Jin — now a sexagenarian — notices a lady atop a large water lily while out at sea. Recognising her as Lady Xia, he eagerly jumps onto the lily which then floats away until it vanishes from sight. The author notes that both Jin and Zhao Hong lived in the Ming dynasty but it is unknown if Zhao's encounter with the Wutong spirits preceded that of Jin; if so, Lady Xia's maid would have had neutered the sole remaining Wutong spirit, ensuring that he could no longer harm women.

== Publication history ==
Written by Pu Songling and first published in his short story anthology, Strange Tales from a Chinese Studio, the story was originally titled "You" (又; literally "Again") because it appears on the heels of another story concerning the Wutong spirits. While a distinct Strange Tales entry on its own, Pu likely paired the two stories due to their similar natures, as he did "The Frog God" and "Another Frog God Tale". Sidney Sondergard translated into English both Wutong stories which included in the fifth volume of Strange Tales from Liaozhai published in 2008.
