= 田中光 =

田中光 is a human name, may refer to:

- Hikaru Tanaka (born 1972), Japanese gymnast
- Tien Chung-kwang, Taiwanese politician

== See also ==
- Hikaru
- Tanaka (disambiguation)
- Tian (disambiguation)
- Tien (disambiguation)
