= Tian (disambiguation) =

Tian may refer to:

- Tian (天), a Chinese religious concept, often translated as "Heaven"
- Tian (dish), an earthenware vessel of Provence, and the dishes prepared in it
- Tian (given name), a Chinese given name
- Tian, pen name of German poet Karoline von Günderrode
- Tian (surname), a Chinese surname (田)
- Tian, Benin, a village in Benin
- Tian, Iran (disambiguation), 2 places in Lorestan province in Iran

== See also ==
- Tien (disambiguation)
- Takashi, Japanese given name
