= Luochahai City =

2023 single by Dao Lang

Song by Dao Lang

from the album Folk Song Liaozhai
- Released: July 19, 2023
- Genre: Folk; pop; reggae; nonsense
- Length: 5:32
- Songwriter: Dao Lang

"Luochahai City" (Note: Also known as "Luocha Haishi", "Raksha Sea Market" and "Luocha Kingdom") (Chinese: 罗刹海市) is a single by Chinese singer-songwriter Dao Lang, released as part of his album Folk Song Liaozhai (2023). The song is inspired by "The Raksha Country and the Sea Market", an allegorical story written by Chinese author Pu Songling. Standing as a release during Dao's general absence from music, it was seen as a comeback. The song is in 7/4 time and has been described as reggae, folk, pop, and nonsense, incorporating jazz in the overture while using rhythm and blues instruments.

The satirical lyrics have been described as absurd and cryptic, making use of homonyms, metaphors, and visual puns with Chinese compound ideographs. The song drew widespread speculation about the target of the satire. Although it is generally acknowledged that the song lampoons Dao's rivals in the music industry, others interpret the song as Dao's critique of Chinese or international politics and society. The popularity of the song has been attributed to the perceived critique of mainstream pop stars and the speculation about the meaning of the lyrics. Aggregating over 10 billion views within two months of its release, it peaked at number 1 on the China TME UNI Chart and remained on the top 100 for at least 22 weeks.

== Background ==
Dao Lang's debut album, The First Snows of 2002 (2004), was well-received critically and sold nearly six million copies by January 2005, making him the best-selling artist in the entire Mandarin Chinese market. Following his initial success, Dao experimented with folk music and soft rock influenced by Central Asian and Uyghur music, espousing life in western China. He was invited to perform at the premiere of House of Flying Daggers (2004), and appeared alongside Hong Kong singer Alan Tam at a concert.

Despite being received positively by the Taiwanese musical establishment, Dao struggled to gain the same professional recognition in mainland China. For instance, in 2010, singer and jury chairwoman Na Ying vetoed his candidacy for the Top 10 Influential Artists of the Past 10 Years list, stating that he lacked "aesthetic sense". Dao left the music industry in 2013, citing a desire to focus on his family, and returned in 2020, releasing three new albums within the span of six months to little fanfare. According to the South China Morning Post, Dao seemed to be "past his best" by the time he released Folk Song Liaozhai on July 19, 2023.

== Inspiration ==
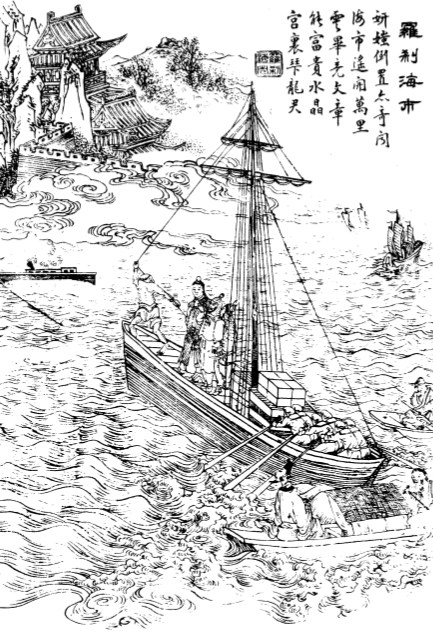
An 1886 illustration of the original short story

"Luochahai City" is based on a Pu Songling story of the same name, keeping with Folk Song Liaozhai's theme. In the original story by Pu, "The Raksha Country and the Sea Market", the handsome merchant Ma Ji is stranded in the eponymous location, where the denizens are ugly to outsiders. The ugliest people (who are beautiful by local standards) have the highest social status. Shunned by society, Ma decides to dirty his face, making career advances as a result. According to Deng Yuwen, Pu wanted to satirize how conformism was rewarded in Chinese society during his era.

== Lyrics, interpretation and instrumentation ==
Dao composed and wrote all the songs on Folk Song Liaozhai, including "Luochahai City".

"Luochahai City"
The China Project described the song as reggae and called the overture "jazzy".

Generally regarded as satirical, the lyrics have been described as "cryptic" and "absurd". In a particularly analyzed verse, Ma Hu, whose name alludes to donkeys, is oblivious to being a donkey, and the 'you' bird, whose name alludes to chickens, is oblivious to being a chicken. What's on Weibo interprets this as a possible metaphor for people who are unaware that they are foolish or weak. Through double entendres, the verse ends by referencing either opera houses or brothels and either fathers-in-law or eunuchs. In the final stanza, Dao mentions philosopher Ludwig Wittgenstein, and ends with the proclamation that "Ma Hu and 'you' bird / are the fundamental question of humanity!" (Note: Translated by Charles A. Laughlin, a professor of East Asian studies at the University of Virginia) Throughout the course of the song, Dao uses several homonyms, metaphors, and visual puns with Chinese characters. For instance, Ma Hu's name is composed of the characters for "horse" (马) and "household" (户), which combine to form the compound ideograph for "donkey" (驴).

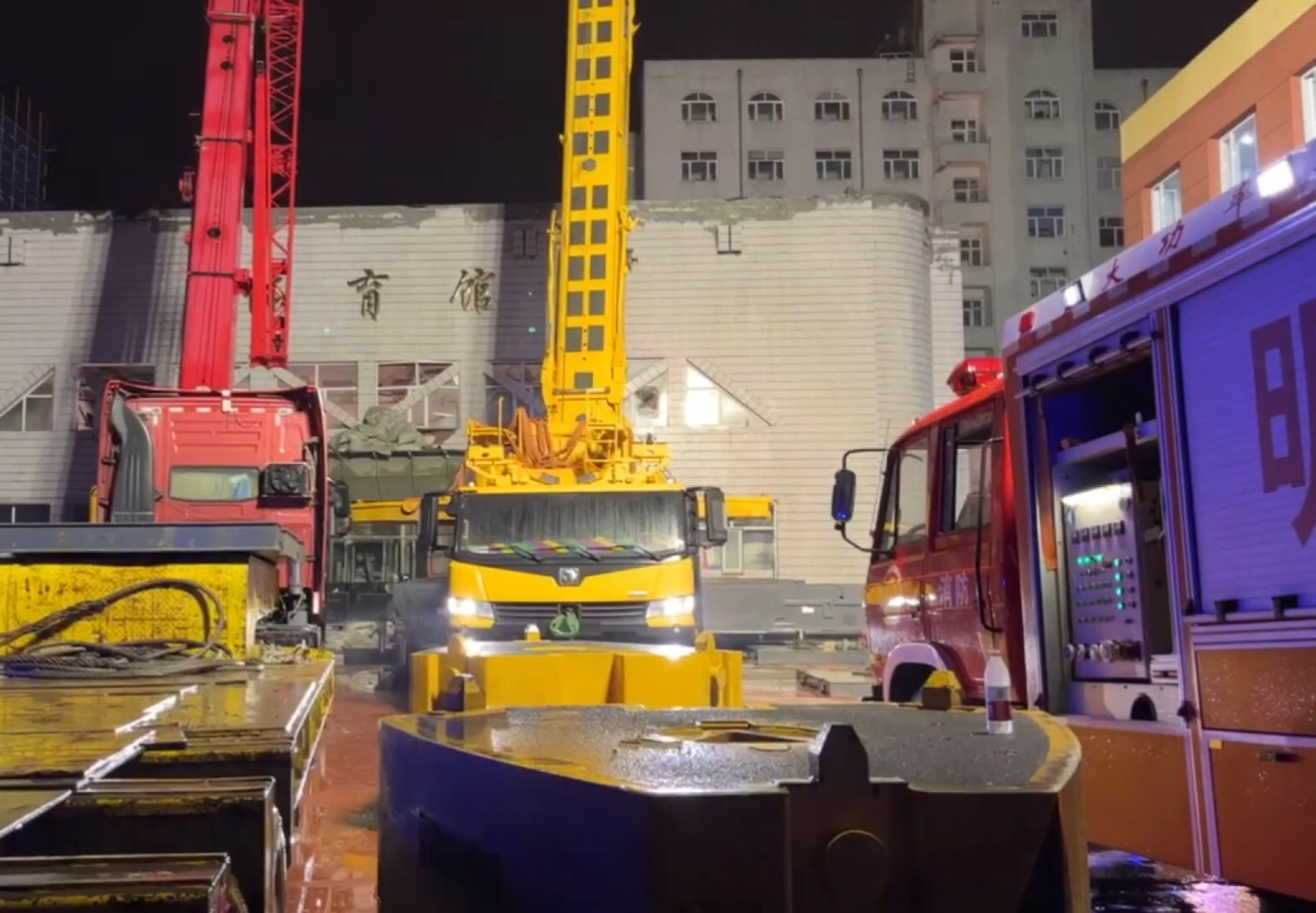
Rescue efforts after the 2023 Qiqihar school gymnasium collapse. The government deployed police to prevent protests from victims' families.

It is generally acknowledged that the song mocks eminent figures in the Chinese music industry, including Na, Gao Xiaosong, Wang Feng, and Yang Kun, for their earlier dismissal of Dao. Another interpretation, endorsed by Deng, posits that the real subjects of the song are authoritarianism, abuse of power, and corruption under the general secretaryship of Xi Jinping since 2012. He cites the deployment of police to prevent potential unrest from the families of the victims of the 2023 Qiqihar school gymnasium collapse as an example of the behaviour being satirized. United Daily News reporter Chen Yanqiao felt that the song's alleged criticism of those in power could also resonate with Taiwan's social climate, noting that several once-respected Taiwanese public figures were disgraced by allegations from the MeToo movement. Other not very recognized readings drew parallels between the eponymous city and the United States, and involve US President Joe Biden, transgender public officials, and the Five Eyes intelligence alliance. Dao himself declined to comment, though a person familiar with him stated that the song was being overinterpreted.

The song is in 7/4 time and does not use the twelve-bar blues structure, with the chords instead arranged to follow the melody. Rhythm and blues instruments such as a bass, guitar, drums and synthesizers are used. A suona solo starts midway through the track and persists until the end. The China Project described the song as "reggae with a jazzy overture", noting that the song drew elements from both Western and Chinese music. The song has also been described as folk, pop, and nonsense.

== Reception ==
The Economist hailed "Luochahai City" as a comeback for Dao, who produced little for a decade. Miles Yu of the Hudson Institute lauded the song for its wit, comparing Dao to Bob Dylan and stating that Dao had become "the powerful expression of a volcanic anti-establishment mentality". Wang, who is possibly lampooned in the lyrics, praised the song's synthesis of Western and Chinese musical styles. Noting its popularity, newswriter Miho Tamura contrasted the oblique satirical lyrics of "Luochahai City" with that of the rap song "New Slave", which directly criticized Shanghai's COVID-19 lockdown and resulted in the song being quickly censored from the Chinese internet.

According to The China Project, the song was released during a Chinese backlash against globalisation, which is often celebrated in popular music, and an increase in interest in traditional Chinese culture. Thus, writer Charles A. Laughlin attributes the song's popularity to the perceived attacks on mainstream pop stars. What's on Weibo speculated that some of the song's listeners did not actually enjoy the music, but were attempting to decipher the lyrics instead.

=== Commercial performance ===
The song has aggregated more than 10 billion views across various social media platforms as of August 2023 (including 6 billion on Douyin). Dao's fans claim that this surpasses the Guinness World Record for most total online impressions held by "Despacito", which has over 5 billion views on YouTube alone as of September 2023. On Weibo, Guinness World Records stated that it was unable to confirm if "Luochahai City" had surpassed "Despacito" because it had not received an application for a new record.

"Luochahai City" peaked at number 1 on the China TME UNI Chart, and up to December 29, 2023, it had stayed on the top 100 for 22 weeks. In June 2024, "Luochahai City" won the award for best lyrics at the 2nd Wave Music Awards, organized by Tencent.

== See also ==
- Diss (music)
