= The Great Sage, Heaven's Equal =

- Short story by Pu Songling
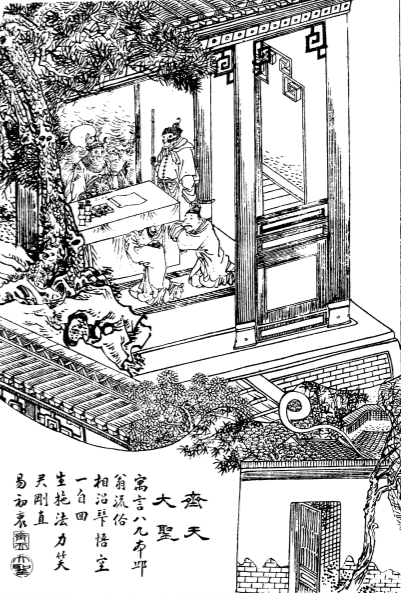
- 19th-century illustration from Xiangzhu liaozhai zhiyi tuyong (Liaozhai Zhiyi with commentary and illustrations; 1886)
- Original title: 齐天大圣 (Qitian dasheng)
- Translator: Sidney L. Sondergard
- Country: China
- Language: Chinese
- Genres: Zhiguai; Fantasy

Publication
- Published in: Strange Stories from a Chinese Studio
- Publication type: Anthology
- Publication date: c. 1740
- Published in English: 2014

Chronology
The Bookworm (书痴)	The Frog God (青蛙神)

"The Great Sage, Heaven's Equal" (simplified Chinese: 齐天大圣; traditional Chinese: 齊天大聖; pinyin: Qí Tiān Dà Shèng) is a short story by Pu Songling first published in Strange Stories from a Chinese Studio (1740). It revolves around Shandong native Xu Sheng, who initially rejects the existence of Sun Wukong but gradually becomes a firm devotee of him after encountering him and experiencing his power. The story acts as social commentary on the worship of mythical characters, in this case Sun Wukong. In 2014, it was translated into English by Sidney L. Sondergard.

== Background ==
Sun Wukong first appeared in the 16th-century Chinese classical novel Journey to the West by Wu Cheng-en. In the novel he is also referred to as "Great Sage, Heaven's Equal" and "Handsome Monkey King". Wu's character was well-received, to the point that some regarded him as a real god. During Pu's time, actual and genuine Sun Wukong shrines were already in existence or emerging, as part of "(t)he cult of this divine monkey". In a larger phenomenon, works of fiction contributed to the public's perception of or belief in deities. Hence, Meir Shahar, in his 1996 chapter on "Vernacular Fiction and the Transmission of Gods' Cults in Late Imperial China", opines that Pu Songling was criticising people's worship of a fictitious character. The translation of the story, titled "The Great Sage, Heaven's Equal" by Sidney L. Sondergard, was released in 2014.

The Martin Bodmer Foundation Library houses a 19th-century Liaozhai manuscript, silk-printed and bound leporello-style, that contains three tales including "The Bookworm", "The Great Sage, Heaven's Equal", and "The Frog God".

== Plot ==
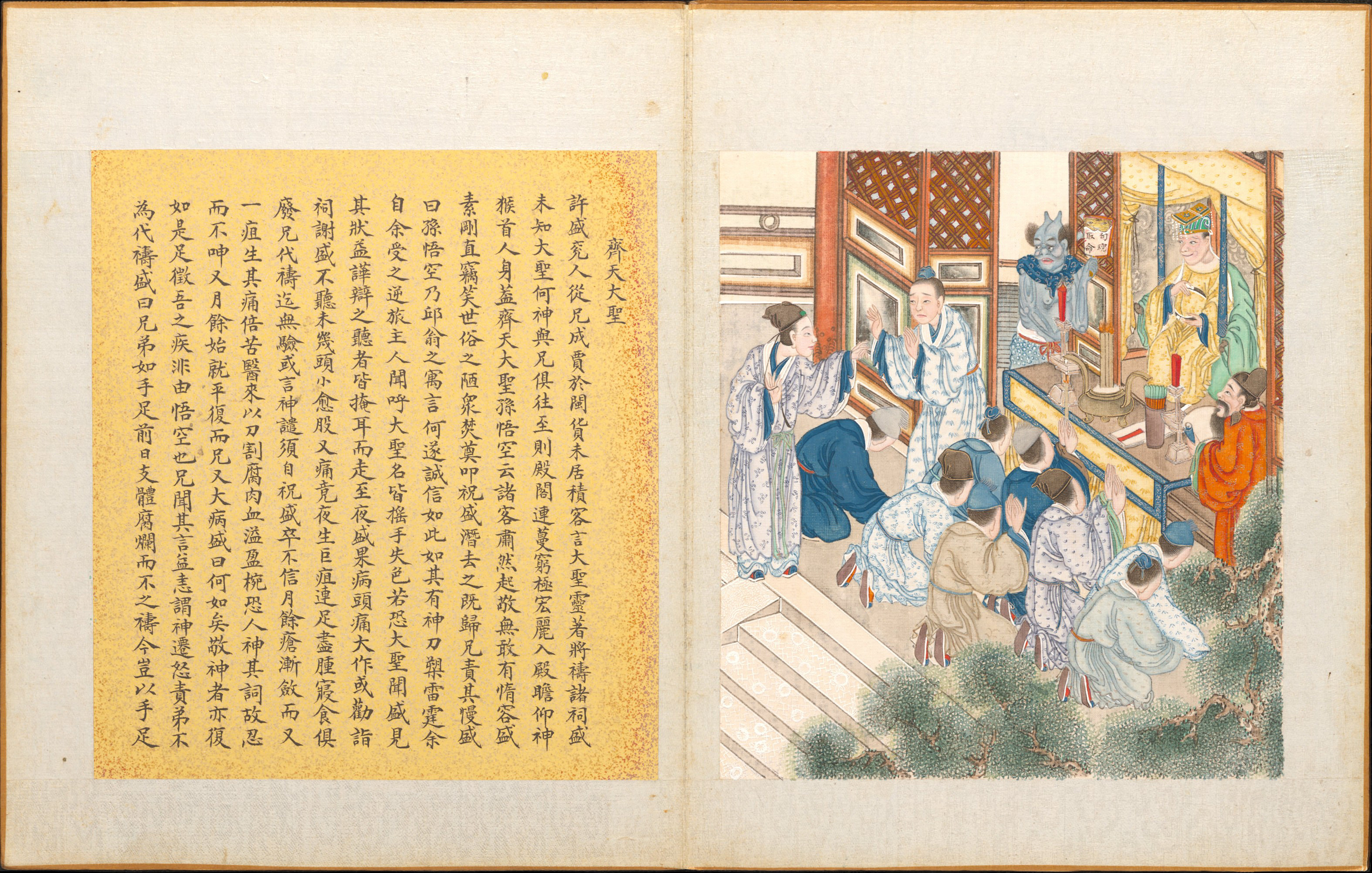
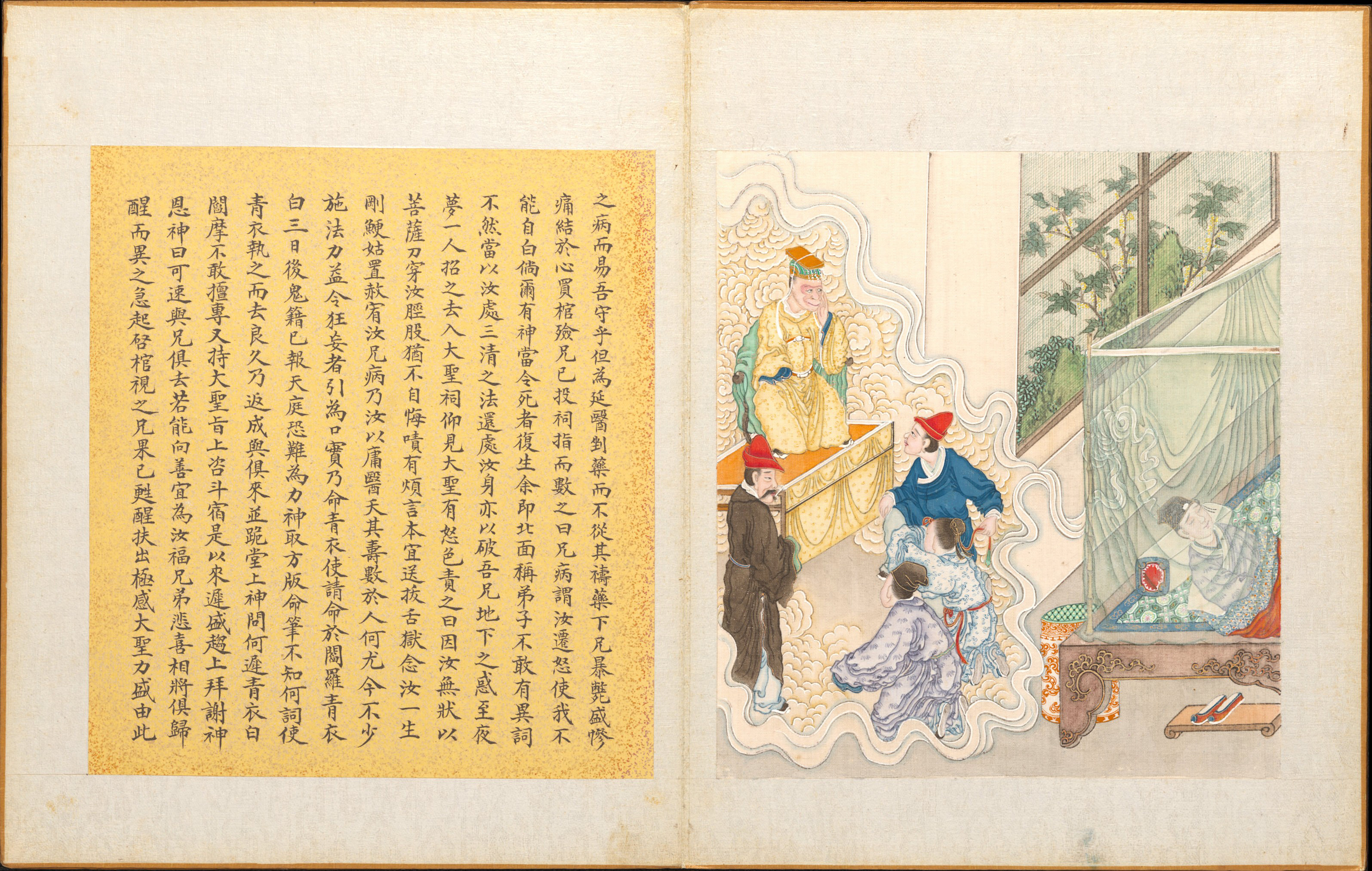
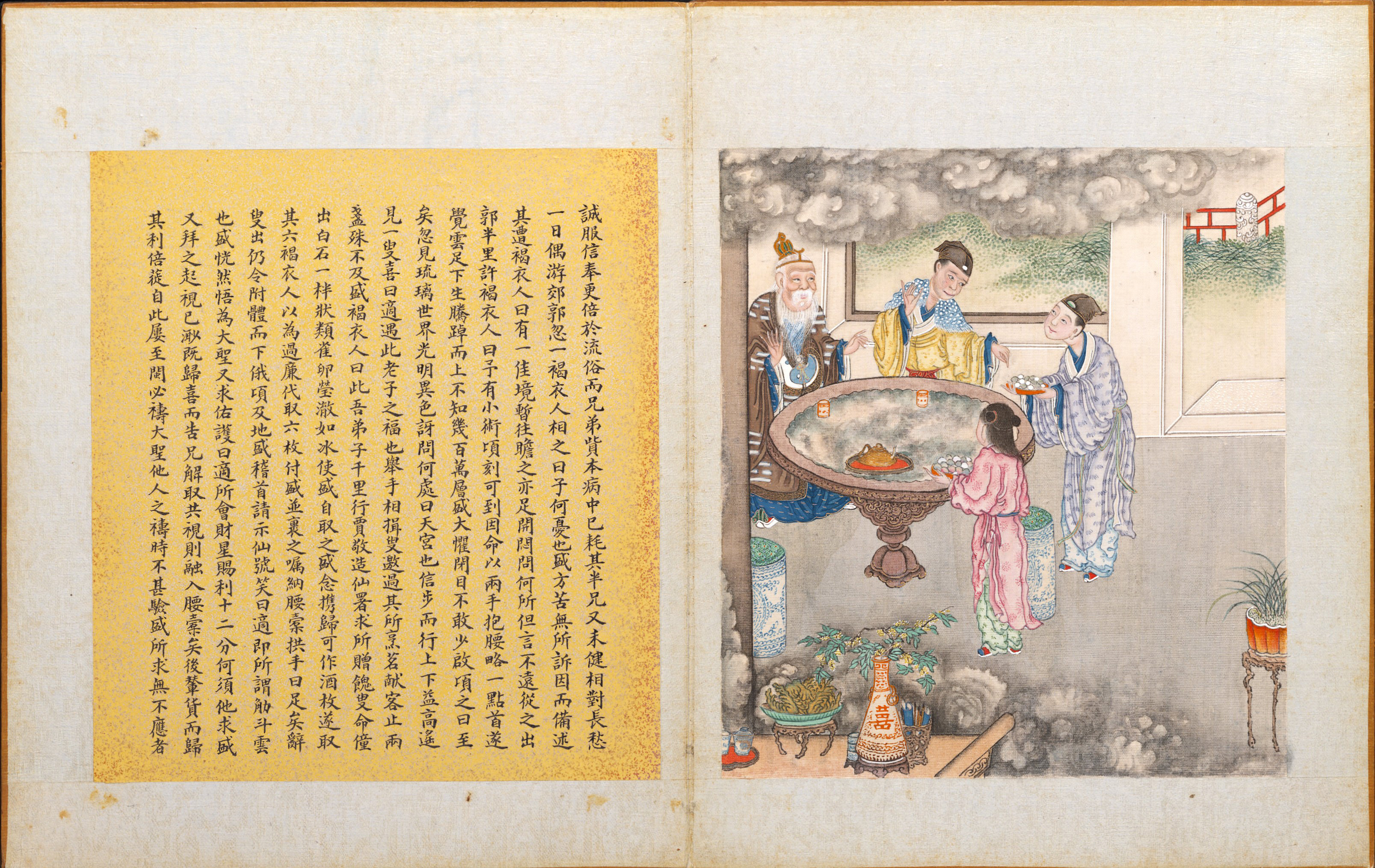
The story as seen in Strange Tales from a Chinese Studio with Illustration (Chinese: 聊齋全圖), published during the Qing dynasty

A struggling merchant, Xu Sheng (许盛), and his elder brother, Xu Cheng (许成), attend a ceremony at a Sun Wukong temple in Fujian, China. Xu Sheng is entirely sceptical of the self-styled "Great Sage, Heaven's Equal" (齐天大圣); in stark contrast, his brother becomes a fervent devotee. Afterwards, much to his brother's shock and chagrin, Xu Sheng remarks, "Sun Wukong is nothing but a parable invented by old Qiu. How can anybody sincerely believe him?" (Note: In Chinese: "孙悟空乃丘翁之寓言,何遂诚信若此?". The authorship of Journey to the West is erroneously attributed to the Taoist sage Qiu Chuji ("Old Qiu").) He then challenges Sun to mete out divine punishment to him if he truly existed. Fujian locals, who live in fear of the monkey god, are equally appalled by Xu Sheng's haughty comments.

Just a while later, Xu Sheng begins to feel unwell. His superstitious brother hurriedly prays to Sun on his behalf but Xu Sheng's physical woes only continue. Xu Sheng is about to believe in the Great Sage's prowess, when he is relieved of further agony after a visit to a physician. Almost instantly, Xu Cheng becomes the ill one and his condition takes a turn for the worse when Xu Sheng refuses to pray to Sun. Before long, Xu Cheng dies; in anger and grief, Xu Sheng storms into the Sun Wukong temple and confronts his effigy, demanding his brother back. At night, Xu Sheng encounters the Monkey King in his dreams, who criticizes him for his rudeness and hiring of an inept practitioner to treat his brother. Nevertheless, Sun also promises to bring Xu Cheng back.

Sure enough, after waking up, Xu Sheng finds Xu Cheng alive in his coffin – it is at this point that he begins to truly believe in Sun Wukong. However, it is a bittersweet occasion for Xu Sheng, given the expenses he had incurred during the trip to Fujian and for his brother's funeral and burial. Furthermore, while revived, his brother still remains relatively weak. Some time afterwards, back in the Yan (now part of Shandong) countryside, Xu Sheng encounters a stranger on the street, to whom he confides his financial troubles, as well as the strange incident in Fujian. The stranger possesses some knowledge of magic, in particular cloud-walking. Together they go to the "temple of heaven", where the stranger procures a few magic stones, said to bring good fortune, for Xu Sheng. At the end of the journey the mystery man reveals himself as Sun Wukong, then vanishes.

The Xu brothers rake in tremendous profits from their business and they make numerous return trips to the Sun Wukong temple. Pu Songling appends a footnote poking fun at Xu Sheng, stressing that "Sheng's mind must have been deluded, for what he saw simply couldn't be true", and concluding that "(w)hen people who share the same beliefs gather together, they will choose some central figure to represent their beliefs".

== Reception ==
Judith T. Zeitlin writes in Historian of the Strange that, apart from his "typical condescension towards popular cults", Pu wished to convey "that spiritual power depends not on the actual existence of a god or a fictional character but on the illusory strength of human belief and desire." She compares Xu Sheng's eventual faith in Sun Wukong with Qian Yi's worship of the Peony Pavilion character Du Liniang; both of them had dreams which turned "a skeptic into a believer".

== See also ==
- List of media adaptations of Journey to the West
