= Liu Qingyun =

Chinese playwright and poet

- Born: c. 1841; Donghai, Jiangsu, China
- Died: c. 1900 (aged 58–59)
- Occupations: Poet; Playwright
- Writing career
- Literary movement: Qing dynasty

- Surname: Liu (刘)
- Given name: Qingyun (清韵)
- Courtesy name: Guxiang (古香)

Liu Qingyun (Chinese: 刘清韵; pinyin: Liú Qīngyùn; c. 1841 – c. 1900), courtesy name Guxiang, was a Chinese playwright and poet. She has been described as "the most prolific woman playwright of the nineteenth century".

== Early life and family ==
Liu Qingyun was born during the Qing dynasty in 1841 or 1842 in Donghai (modern day Lianyungang), Jiangsu. Her father, Liu Yuntang, was a successful businessman and also a "high official", and was around fifty when Qingyun, his first child, was born. Her mother was surnamed Wang. Afterwards, Wang bore two more girls. At a young age, Qingyun already demonstrated exceptional linguistic capabilities, and proved to be talented in painting and writing poetry. Aged eighteen, she wed Qian Meipo, who hailed from an affluent family in Haizhou. The couple had no biological children, although they adopted a girl named Mincai when Liu was around thirty years old.

== Career and death ==
As a playwright, Liu's works were well-received by contemporary critics. Liu was influenced by the works of Pu Songling; at least three of her plays were inspired by stories from Strange Tales from a Chinese Studio. An Unsung Hero (丹青副) is based on "Tian Qilang"; Prelude to the Phoenix from Heaven (天风引) is based on "The Raksha Country and the Sea Market"; and The Whistle of the Flying Rainbow (飞虹啸) is inspired by "Mistress Geng". Liu was also a prolific poet, and wrote more than two hundred poems in her lifetime. These poems were later compiled into two anthologies with the help of her husband and her tutor Wang Yi. Qian also assisted in the compilation of Liu's plays, which numbered twenty-four in total; a copy of Plays from the Pavilion of the Immortals of Xiao Penglai is now housed at the National Taiwan University. A "catastrophic" series of floods in Shuyang in 1897, however, destroyed a sizeable portion of Liu's works. Little is known about Liu Qingyun's death; most sources state that she died "after 1900". According to the Chinese Dictionary of Chinese Literature, Liu died in 1916. Wilt Idema and Beata Grant write in The Red Brush that Liu Qingyun was "by far the most prolific woman playwright of the nineteenth century".

== Select works ==
=== Plays ===
- An Unsung Hero (丹青副)
- The Guidance of the Heavenly Wind (天風引)
- Sighs Gazing at the Ocean (望洋叹)
- The Whistle of the Flying Rainbow (飞虹啸)
