= Tayun =

Tayun (Persian: تيون) may refer to:

- Tayun, Fars
- Tayun, Lorestan (disambiguation)
