= Dao Lang (singer) =

Chinese Musician (born 1971)

Mandarin pop male singer, songwriter, and musician
- 刀郎
- Born: Luo Lin; 22 June 1971 (age 55); Zizhong County, Neijiang, Sichuan, China
- Occupation: Singer-songwriter
- Years active: 2001–present
- Musical career
- Genres: Mandopop

Luo Lin (Chinese: 罗林; pinyin: Luó Lín; born 22 June 1971), known professionally as Dao Lang (Chinese: 刀郎; pinyin: Dāo Láng), is a Chinese singer from Sichuan.

== Biography ==
Dao's CD, The First Snows of 2002 (2002年的第一場雪), released in 2003, made him an instant star in China. He sang with Alan Tam on the debut "Can't Say Goodbye" (說不出的告別) in the Cantonese version and later, bilingual between Mandarin and Cantonese. His other albums include 2001's Songs from the Western Region .

Dao toured the Chinese cities of Chengdu, Chongqing, and Xi'an, as well as the autonomous region of Tibet, for more than four years as a young bar-hopping musician. He has been called the "Wang Luobin of the 21st century" and has performed modern rock adaptations of several of Wang Luobin's Western China-inspired folk songs, such as "Awariguli" (a Xinjiang Uyghur folk love song), "Flowers and Youth" (a Hui Muslim song), and "At a Faraway Place" (a song from western China's Qinghai). He has also performed modern adaptations of such renowned old Chinese folk songs as "The Grapes of Turpan are Ripe" and the famous revolutionary song "Nanniwan".

Dao experienced a surge of popularity in 2023 with the release of his album There Are a Few Folk Songs (山歌寥哉), based on the work of Pu Songling. In particular, his satirical song "Luochahai City" or Luosha Kingdom (罗刹海市) went viral. The song is based from The Raksha Country and the Sea Market.

In 2024, A comeback online concert given by veteran Chinese singer Dao Lang, who had been out of the spotlight for a decade, was watched by 53 million internet users.Fans gave 640 million thumbs-up during the show and many were moved to tears.The concert titled The Place Where the Folk Song is Heard lasted for three and a half hours on August 30 and went viral on the mainland, Xinmin Evening News reported.

== Awards ==
Dao was considered by the Beijing Music Society in 2002 as the "Best Pop Singer" and "Artist of the Year". The only other young artists that had received this honor were Cui Jian in 1987 and Huang Yujie in 2008.

== Discography ==
- 2001：大漠情歌
- 2002：楼兰钟鼓
- 2003：丝路乐韵
- 2003：丝路乐魂
- 2003：西域情歌 (合作：黄灿)
- 2004：2002年的第一场雪
- 2004：北方的天空下
- 2004：喀什噶尔胡杨
- 2006：披着羊皮的狼
- 2006：谢谢你
- 2006：刀郎III
- 2007：与狼共舞(Remix)
- 2008：红色经典
- 2009：西域记事
- 2009：一家人
- 2011：刀郎2011身披彩衣的姑娘
- 2020：弹词话本
- 2020：如是我闻
- 2021：世间的每个人
- 2023：山歌寥哉
