= The Purple Lotus Buddhist =

- Short story by Pu Songling
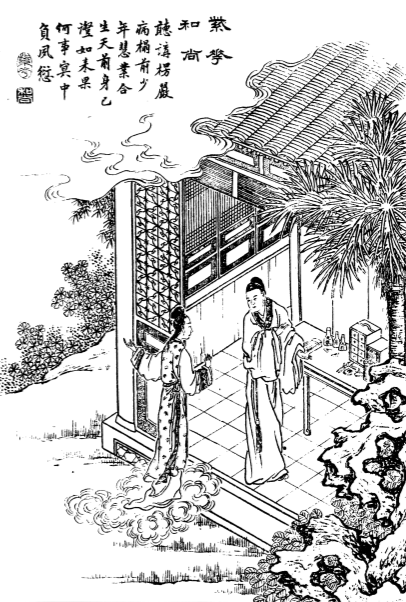
- The maidservant and the scholar; 19th-century illustration from Xiangzhu liaozhai zhiyi tuyong (Liaozhai with commentary and illustrations; 1886)
- Original title: 紫花和尚 (Zihuaheshang)
- Translator: Sidney L. Sondergard
- Country: China
- Language: Chinese
- Genre: Zhiguai

Publication
- Published in: Strange Stories from a Chinese Studio
- Publication type: Anthology
- Publication date: c. 1740
- Published in English: 2010

Chronology
The Raksha Country and the Sea Market (罗刹海市)	Ju Le (鞠乐如)

"The Purple Lotus Buddhist" (Chinese: 紫花和尚; pinyin: Zǐhuā Héshàng) is a short story by Pu Songling collected in Strange Stories from a Chinese Studio or Liaozhai Zhiyi (1740). It revolves around a Chinese man battling a life-threatening illness. The tale was included in the fourth volume of Sidney Sondergard's translation of Liaozhai published in 2010.

== Plot ==
Ding Xiucai (丁秀才), the grandson of Ding Yehe (丁野鹤) and a resident of Zhucheng County, succumbs to a prolonged illness. A night after his demise, he miraculously comes back to life exclaiming, "I am enlightened!". Ding then invites a famous monk, known for being well-versed in Buddhist theology, to explain the Śūraṅgama Sūtra; yet, he continuously interrupts the monk, claiming that his interpretation of the sutra is inaccurate. Ding comments, "If my illness were to be cured, what would be understanding the sutra? However, I only know of one person who can cure my illness; I must invite him over." The person Ding has in mind is a scholar with an abundance of medical knowledge but he does not professionally practise medicine. Ding finally convinces the scholar to help him out after three tries, and his prescription works like a charm.

On his way back home, the scholar encounters a woman who introduces herself as a maidservant of the Dong Shangshu household. She chastises the scholar for treating Ding Xiucai, and tells him, "The Purple Lotus Buddhist and us have bad blood. He has gotten his just deserts – why are you attempting to save his life?" With that, she vanishes. Some time later, Ding suffers a relapse but the scholar, terrified of the woman, rejects his pleas for help. Ding eventually cajoles him into explaining his refusal to help him, after which he resignedly says, "Karma is a result of one's actions in his or her past lives. Should I die today, it is what I deserve." No sooner had he finished his monologue than he died.

Pu writes that there was indeed a Purple Lotus Buddhist, who was a very pious monk. Dong Shangshu once hosted the monk at his residence, but nobody knows what transpired between them.

== Background ==
Written by Pu Songling and originally titled "Zihuaheshang" (紫花和尚), "The Purple Lotus Buddhist" was first collected in the 1740 publication Strange Tales from a Chinese Studio (Liaozhai), and fully translated into English by Sidney L. Sondergard in 2010.

== Reception ==
Zhan Dan argues that "The Purple Lotus Buddhist" predominantly serves as a narrative on morality, and how monastic life is bound by many rules, especially with regard to love and lust. Thus the titular Purple Lotus Buddhist, having ostensibly sinned in his past life, is made to atone for it when reincarnated as a famous young man.
