= Dao Lang =

Dao Lang (刀郎) may refer to:

- Dolan people or Dao Lang (in Chinese), name of a people or region of what is now Xinjiang Province, China
- Dao Lang (singer), pseudonym for Luo Lin (罗林), a Chinese singer
