= Tianshan Snow Lotus Group =

Tianshan Snow Lotus Group 天山雪莲·古丽组合 Tiānshān Xuělián Gǔ Lì Zǔhé
- Origin: Xinjiang
- Years active: 1997–present

Tianshan Snow Lotus Group (Chinese: 天山雪莲·古丽组合; pinyin: Tiānshān Xuělián Gǔ Lì Zǔhé) is a Uyghur music group specializing in a fusion of music styles that integrates traditional Uyghur classical, Latin, Arabic, Turkish, European and pop music. They are particularly noted for their unique music style, brisk pace, dance on stage and charismatic performances.

The all-female music group is composed of five girls from Xinjiang; their group is named for the snow lotus that grows in the Tian Shan mountain range in Xinjiang. The music group members are all graduates of local music conservatories and can sing as well as play traditional Uyghur musical instruments.

== Career ==
The music group has been active since 1997 when they gained notoriety and rose to national prominence. They performed for major concert tours in 1997, 1998, 1999 and 2002. Since then they have also prominently featured in major national televised events and concerts in China.

In 2004 they were invited along with Uyghur pop singer and flamenco guitarist Erkin Abdulla to sing for the CCTV Spring Festival Gala the traditional Uyghur folk song Alamuhan, in Mandarin Chinese, representing Xinjiang among various ethnic groups of China. The following year they were again invited to sing with Arken Abdulla at the 2005 CCTV Spring Festival Gala the traditional Uyghur folksong Lift Your Veil, this time in Uyghur as well as in Mandarin Chinese, again representing Xinjiang among various ethnic groups of China. In 2006 they were invited to perform for the Ministry of Culture Spring Festival Gala.

In 2007, they held a special concert to celebrate the tenth anniversary of the group's formation. On August 8, 2007, they also performed for the national concert celebrating the countdown to the 2008 Summer Olympics to be held in Beijing, singing the song First Anniversary. In 2008 they performed in the CCTV Spring Festival Evening program. They also performed at the 2008 Summer Olympics closing ceremony.
