= Wang Luobin =

Chinese songwriter

- Born: December 28, 1913; Beijing, China
- Died: March 14, 1996 (aged 82); Xinjiang, China
- Occupation: Songwriter
- Spouse: Huang Yulan
- Children: Wang Haiyan, Wang Haixing, Wang Haicheng
- Awards: UNESCO Outstanding Contributions to the Exchange of Western and Eastern Cultures

Chinese name
- Traditional Chinese: 王洛賓
- Simplified Chinese: 王洛宾
Transcriptions
- Musical career
- Origin: People's Republic of China (China)
- Genres: Chinese folk music

Wang Luobin (Chinese: 王洛宾; 28 December 1913 – 14 March 1996) was a Chinese songwriter. He specialized in publishing Mandarin-language songs based on the music of various ethnic minorities in western China.

Wang was born in Beijing on 28 December 1913. As a child, he and his father were jailed by the Kuomintang-led North Route Army for "disturbing the peace" after they had sung an aria outside following an opera performance. This would turn out to be one of several times that he would be detained, and was quoted in his later life as stating "I have been fated to meet with two things in my life: one is music and the other is prison". He graduated from the Music Department of Beijing Normal University in 1934 and actively participated in the Second Sino-Japanese War on China's behalf beginning in 1937 in Shanxi Province. In 1938, in Lanzhou in Gansu Province, Wang published his first Xinjiang-inspired song, "The Girl from Dabancheng". He took up residence in northwestern China for more than 50 years since then, and devoted his time there to transcribing, adapting, collecting and revising western Chinese folk songs. In all, Wang wrote seven operas and edited six songbooks, and published some 700 Xinjiang-style songs, the most famous of which include "Alamuhan" (阿拉木汗, inspired by a Uyghur song), "Awariguli" (also supposedly a Uyghur song), "Flowers and Youth" (pinyin: Hua'er Yu Shaonian, a Hui Muslim folk song), "In that place wholly faraway" (a song from Qinghai Province), "Lift Your Veil" (掀起你的盖头来), "Duldal and Maria" (a Kazakh folk song), "Mayila", and "The Crescent Moon Rises" (半个月亮爬上来; pinyin: Ban Ge Yueliang Pa Shang Lai). A common theme in Wang's work was the portrayal of local women as "beauties" for a male Han narrator to fall in love with, which corresponded with broader stereotypes of feminized ethnic minorities among the Han majority in China.

Wang began to win accolades for his work towards the end of his life. In 1993, "At a Faraway Place" and "The Crescent Moon Rises" were selected as the Chinese music classics of the 20th century. A year later, in July 1994, Wang received the Award for Outstanding Contributions to the Exchange of Western and Eastern Cultures from UNESCO. Wang was made the honorary town head of Dabancheng in the Xinjiang Uyghur Autonomous Region by the local government in December of that year. He became known as the "Song King of the West" (西部歌王; Xībù gē wáng).

When Wang tried to copyright "Xinjiang-style" songs he had published, a controversy evolved about whether he had stolen these folk songs from minority peoples' traditions, i.e. whether he had actually "composed" (chuàngzuò 创作) them, or just "transcribed" (jìlù 记录) and "added [Chinese] lyrics" (yìpèi 译配) to traditional songs. In 1994, activist Sidiⱪ Haji Rozi, who since had to flee and seek asylum the United States, published an article in the newspaper Ürümqi keqilik geziti (Wūlǔmùqí wǎnbào 《乌鲁木齐晚报》) in China titled "Song Thief Wang Luobin, Stop Stealing!". This was an example of criticism in the 1990s by Uyghur artists, as well as some prominent Han musicologists, about Wang's use of folk songs and his portrayal of minority groups, with his translations being considered a misrepresentation and "degradation" of Turkic culture.

Wang married Huang Yulan in Lanzhou in 1945 and had three sons, Wang Haiyan, Wang Haixing and Wang Haicheng. Huang died in 1951 as a result of tuberculosis. Wang had lived in Australia for a period of time with his son Haiyan who immigrated in 1981, and stated that some of his later work was inspired by the Australian landscape and natural flora and fauna.

Wang died of cancer on 14 March 1996 at the age of 82. His songs continue to be popular today, and modern adaptations of them have been recorded by the Beijing Angelic Choir, a Chinese children's choir that has earned recognition both at home and abroad; by China's popular Twelve Girls Band; and by the famous Chinese rock singer Dao Lang, who is known for his western China-themed pop music and has been deemed "the Wang Luobin of the 21st century".

== Sources ==
- Baranovitch, Nimrod (September 2003). "From the Margins to the Centre: The Uyghur Challenge in Beijing" (PDF). The China Quarterly. 175: 726–750. doi:10.1017/S0305741003000420. ISSN 0305-7410.
- Harris, Rachel (July 2005). "Wang Luobin: Folk Song King of the Northwest or Song Thief?: Copyright, Representation, and Chinese Folk Songs". Modern China. 31 (3): 381–408. doi:10.1177/0097700405276354. ISSN 0097-7004. S2CID 145245577.
- Smith Finley, Joanne (2015). "4. Whose Xinjiang? Whose Xinjiang? Space, place and power in the rock fusion of Xin Xinjiangren, Dao Lang". In Hayes, Anna; Clarke, Michael (eds.). Inside Xinjiang: Space, Place and Power in China's Muslim Far Northwest. Routledge. ISBN 978-1-317-67250-0.
