= The Raksha Country and the Sea Market =

Short story by Pu Songling

- Short story by Pu Songling
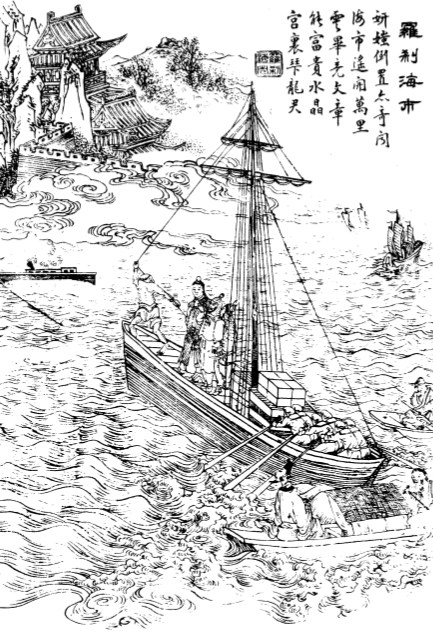
- Illustration from Xiangzhu liaozhai zhiyi tuyong (Liaozhai Zhiyi with commentary and illustrations; 1886)
- Original title: 羅剎海市 (Luosha Haishi)
- Translator: Herbert Giles (1877)
- Country: China
- Language: Chinese
- Genres: Zhiguai; Chuanqi; Short story

Publication
- Published in: Strange Tales from a Chinese Studio
- Media type: Print (Book)
- Publication date: 1740
- Published in English: 1877

Chronology
Qingmei (青梅)	The Purple Lotus Buddhist (紫花和尚)

"The Raksha Country and the Sea Market" (simplified Chinese: 罗刹海市; traditional Chinese: 羅剎海市; pinyin: Luōchà Hǎishì) is a short story by Pu Songling first published in Strange Tales from a Chinese Studio. Told in two parts, the story follows the adventures of scholar-merchant Ma Ji, and is one of the first Strange Tales entries to be translated into English. Some critics have argued that "The Raksha Country" serves as social commentary on topics including hypocrisy, conventional standards of beauty, and nationalism. The story was likely inspired by both ancient Hindu mythology and early Chinese literature; it has been adapted for the stage.

== Plot ==
Ma Ji (Note: Given as "Ma Jun" or "Ma Chün" (馬駿) in the 1766 "Qingke Pavilion" edition of Liaozhai.) (马骥), courtesy name Longmei (龙媒), is a handsome scholar who graduates at fourteen while "(acquiring) the sobriquet of the Beauty" with his fine manners and appreciation of the arts. However, his ageing father dissuades him from continuing his current lifestyle, and advises him to be a trader instead. Out at sea, the junior Ma encounters a typhoon and is shipwrecked on an island inhabited by grotesque and impoverished creatures. Initially treated as a pariah, most of the creatures slowly warm up to Ma when they realise that their fears of his being a "man-eater" (噬人者) are unfounded.

Ma learns from the villagers that they had long regarded China as a mythical country; he also finds out that social hierarchy in their country – Raksha – is determined by beauty standards that are antithetical to those of the surface world. Ma is accompanied by the villagers to the capital of Raksha, whose walls are described as ink-black and whose gatehouses are 100 chi (百尺) high. They spot the Prime Minister, who has three nostrils and eyelashes "like bamboo screens hanging in front of his eyes" and is flanked by less ugly officials. Shunned by virtually all the city folk, Ma is introduced to a former Raksha diplomat, who is now a supercentenarian. The old man agrees to take Ma to the palace but his memorial to the throne is rejected by the king's ministers on the grounds that Ma's "appearance was so hideous it might frighten His Majesty".

Ma is disappointed by the news and has a few drinks with his aged host; while inebriated, Ma paints his face black and impersonates Zhang Fei. The former diplomat persuades Ma to reproduce the act for the officials who are quickly enraptured by his "beautiful" makeup and "bewitching" singing. Ma wins the king's favour and is appointed to the privy council. However, he becomes increasingly ostracised by the other officials who eventually surmise that he is only disguising himself. Under the pretext of sickness, Ma returns to the village and gifts the villagers with gold and precious stones. To reciprocate, they offer to fetch rare pearls from the "sea market" – a trading hub that also houses the mermaids' treasures – but warn Ma against accompanying them. Ma nonchalantly decides to board a ship bound for the sea market.

The vessel reaches the sea market in three days and its passengers are greeted by walls "as long as a man's body" and buildings extending to the Milky Way. The third Prince of the Dragon Palace soon makes his entrance, whereupon he jubilantly welcomes Ma and takes him to the Dragon King. The king demands that the Chinese scholar write some poetry for him; Ma "immediately (throws) off some thousand odd verses". Assuming that Ma is a bachelor, the king allows him to marry his daughter. The following three years are blissful ones for Ma, and he is well-received both as the Dragon King's son-in-law and a palace official.

However, he becomes homesick and beckons his wife to return to his hometown with him. The princess replies that she cannot do so, but approves of his desire to return to his parents. The king makes the necessary arrangements. As they are preparing to bid farewell to each other, the princess reveals that she is pregnant; Ma tells her to name the child Longgong (龙宫) if a daughter and Fuhai (福海) if a son. He also hands her a pair of jade lilies as a memento. She informs him that in three years from their separation, she will hand him the baby on the eighth day of the fourth month. (Note: Per the lunar calendar.)

Ma Ji is reunited with his parents, and discovers that his former wife has since remarried another man. He decides to honour his marital vows with the dragon princess and only takes a concubine. Three years later, he returns to the site of the sea market where he is greeted by twins – a boy and a girl – and a letter from the princess in which she bemoans their separation by referencing the stories of Chang'e and The Cowherd and the Weaver Girl. The children ask Ma to take them back home, to which he wistfully replies, "Where is your home?" (Note: In Chinese: "儿知家在何许?") Back home, Ma's ailing mother passes on; the princess briefly attends her mother-in-law's funeral and in a strange series of events, Ma's mother's coffin vanishes. Thereafter, Fuhai goes in search of his mother but Longgong, being a female, cannot accompany him. However, the princess travels to Earth to pay both her children a visit and gifts them with camphor, pearls, and a coral tree, among other precious items. Ma rushes to greet his lover but she disappears in a clap of thunder.

== Publication history ==
Originally titled "Luocha Haishi" (羅剎海市; literally "Raksha Sea Market"), the story was first published in Pu Songling's anthology of close to five hundred short stories, Strange Tales from a Chinese Studio or Liaozhai zhiyi. Prior to the publication of Strange Stories from a Chinese Studio (1880), which is widely regarded as the first substantial translation of Liaozhai, British sinologist Herbert Giles had already translated two Liaozhai entries into English – "The Lo-Ch'a Country and the Sea Market" and "Dr. Tsêng's Dream" – in 1877.

== Themes and analysis ==
The story is one of the few Liaozhai entries pertaining to overseas travel, recalling "The Kingdom of Raksha" (also about a Chinese merchant and the Rakshas) and "The Foreigners", which follows Filipino fishermen shipwrecked on an unknown island, among other stories. According to Qing dynasty critic Feng Zhenluan (冯镇峦), "The Raksha Country and the Sea Market" comprises "two disconnected episodes". In the first, zhiguai-like episode, the protagonist Ma Ji encounters the monsters of the Raksha Country; the second, written in the chuanqi fashion, concerns Ma's voyage to the sea market, his subsequent romance with a dragon princess and their eventual parting of ways.

Several commentators have suggested that the titular "sea market" is imaginary. Giles notes that it "is generally understood in the sense of mirage, or some similar phenomenon". Liana Chen elaborates that Pu's "deliberate materialisation of the familiar trope signifying the invisible and the actual reality" suggests that "the world Ma Ji enters ... is surreal and does not exist". Pu's reference to "the castle in the clouds and the mirage of the sea" is thus seen as ironic; the "deliberately" tragic conclusion of the story reminds the reader that a magical dreamland that absolves one of all his problems cannot exist.

Shengyu Wang comments that the zhiguai style of the prose in the first half of the story is reminiscent to Ming dynasty text Illustrated Account of Foreign Lands or Yiyu tuzhi (異域圖志); like the various anecdotes of "barbaric" (夷) foreigners found in Yiyu tuzhi, "The Raksha Country" also deals with the concept of the "foreign devil" insofar as the Rakshas treat Ma as a "devil" (妖) per Herbert Giles' translation. In a similar theme, Karl Kao describes the story as being about "the assimilation of the self into the other" given that Ma has to "introject alien values". Giles himself understood the story to be "about the mystery of the Other".

Judith Zeitlin argues that Pu is "mocking these proverbial cramped up scholars who refuse to believe anything that they have not seen with their own eyes". On the other hand, Chen calls the story "a shrewd social allegory that satirize (sic) the Chinese court culture". She posits that Pu is "(critiquing) insincerity and hypocrisy in his own society and thereby questions the existence of a spiritual Utopia, or refuge, for the literati" through the contrast of two worlds – the "hideous" Raksha Country and the "desirable yet surreal" Dragon Palace. For instance, Ma's painting of his face black so as to be "handsome" by Raksha standards, and thus curry favour with the king, mirrors the real-life practice of being two-faced.

Chun-shu Chang and Shelley Chang contend that "The Raksha Country" contains anti-Manchu sentiments which are "expressed by Pu in a subtle and indirect style" – the Rakshas represent the Manchus, whereas Ma's being made to conform to Raksha standards recalls the Manchus forcing all Chinese men to shave their heads. While writing "The Raksha Country" and other Liaozhai stories in Shandong, Pu would likely have witnessed the many anti-Manchu riots that took place in the vicinity.

Pu challenges the conventional standards of beauty in "The Raksha Country". Suggesting that the ideas of the "strange" and "normal" are relative, Giles writes that the first episode of "The Raksha Country" is a "clever amplification" of Robert Burns' 1786 Scots language poem "To a Louse" which is written from the perspective of a louse; what is grotesque to Ma is regarded as beautiful by the Rakshas. Similarly, Glen Dudbridge points out Pu's reversal of "conventional expectations for ironic effect", in that "normal standards of beauty and ugliness are turned upside down, and a handsome man is viewed as an ogre."

== Inspiration ==
The Rakshas are not unique to Pu's work and in fact originate from ancient Hindu mythology, with multiple epics detailing the inhabitants of Rakshasa Kingdom as "hideous-looking, bloodthirsty evil spirits" that were a bane to mankind. Such mythology, and by extension stories of the Rakshas, were likely disseminated to the Chinese in either the Sui or Tang dynasty via translated Buddhist scriptures from India. A parable on the Rakshasas from the Abhiniṣkramaṇa Sūtra has many parallels with Pu's story, which suggests that he borrowed heavily from the translated texts. However, he also made his own modifications, for example omitting the Buddhist call to live a more ascetic and less materialistic lifestyle. Stories concerning the Dragon Palace likewise predate Liaozhai. Specifically, there exist at least three stories from the Tang dynasty that revolve around a romance between a Chinese scholar and a dragon princess, and more plays adapted from these stories, like "Liu Yi and the Dragon Princess of Dongting" (柳毅洞庭龙女）and "A Tower of Mirage" (蜃中楼).

== Literary significance and reception ==
Pu's contemporary, Tang Menglai, suggests that "The Raksha Country" allows for the "satiric demystification of the strange", musing in the second-to-earliest preface of Liaozhai that "strangeness" is both relative as well as most pertinent to human ethics:

I consider that regardless of whether something is normal or abnormal, only things that are harmful to human beings are monstrous. Thus ... (o)nly military and civil conscription out of season or rebellious sons and ministers are monstrous and strange.

— Tang (1682) as translated by Zeitlin (1997)

In his 1877 translation of "The Lo-Ch'a Country and the Sea Market", Giles states his preference for the first half of the story, while noting that the second half is "far more highly prized" by the Chinese readership. Allan Barr argues that "The Raksha Country" and related Liaozhai entries like "The Island of Immortals" and "Gongsun Jiuniang" – which have their foils in stories including "The Fox in the Bottle" and "Wu Tong" – support the view that "whereas a union between a human male and an alien woman can be seen in a positive light, the reverse is viewed as intolerable".

== Adaptations ==
"The Raksha Country and the Sea Market" has been adapted into several theatrical productions. Two early examples include The Guidance of the Heavenly Wind (天風引), written by Liu Qingyun and published in 1900, though probably never publicly staged, and The Realm of Ultimate Bliss (極樂世界), written by the enigmatic "Theatregoing Daoist Priest" (觀劇道人) in 1840 during the First Opium War but only published some forty-one years later. Liu Qingyun's adaptation consists of ten scenes, but unlike Pu's story, it has a comic ending – Ma's parents are allowed to relocate to the Dragon Kingdom thus he is able to exercise his filial responsibilities while remaining with his dragon lover. On the other hand, The Realm of Ultimate Bliss has 82 scenes and is staged in the pihuang (皮黃) style; (Note: A predecessor to Beijing opera.) the "Theatregoing Daoist Priest" intended for his play to "(offset) the vulgar ones performed nowadays in the theatre".

== See also ==
- Luochahai City, a 2023 single by Dao Lang based on this story
