= Study Times =

Chinese Communist Party newspaper

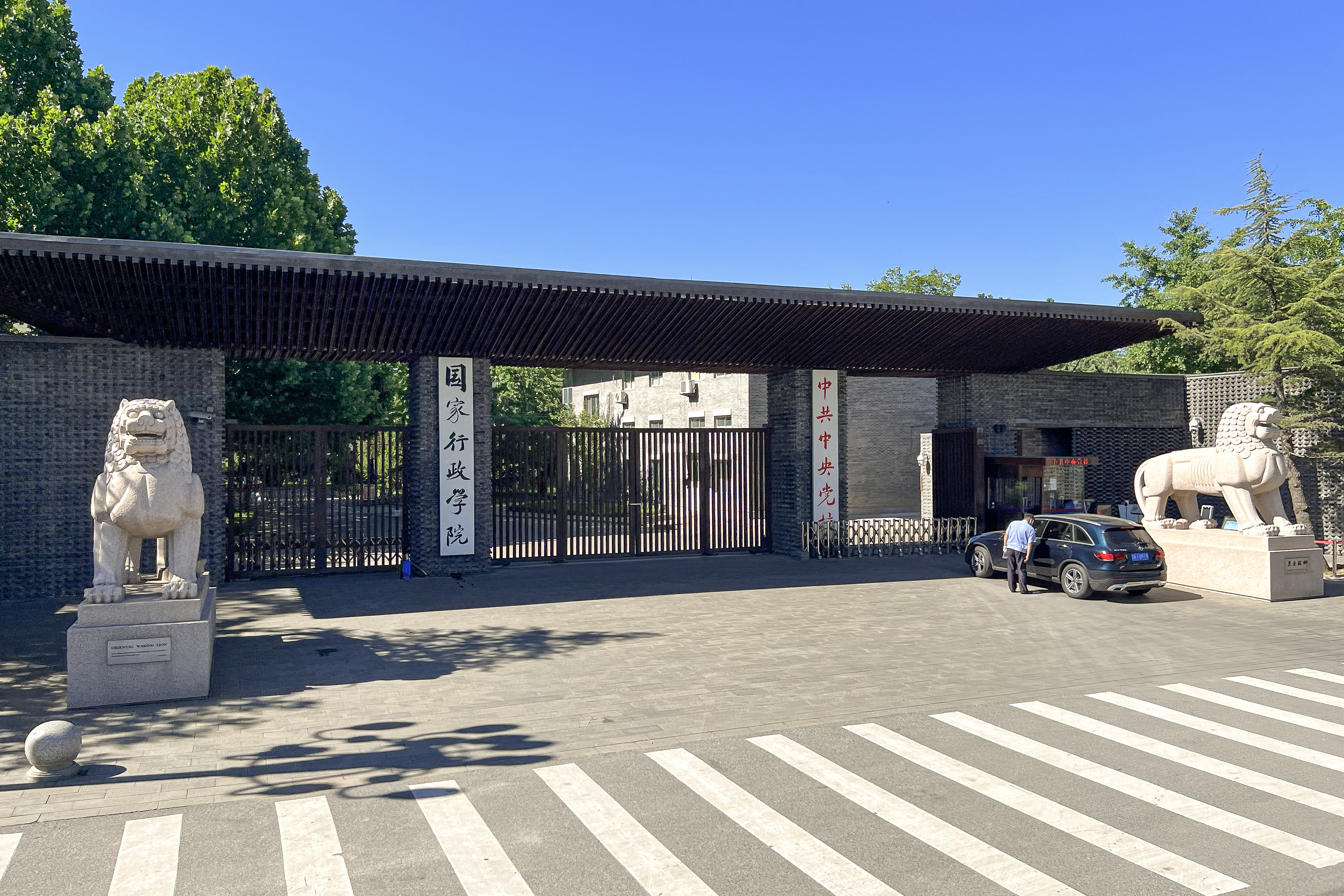
- Headquarters
- Type: Published every Monday, Wednesday and Friday
- Owner: Central Party School
- Publisher: Study Times Press
- Founded: September 1999; 27 years ago
- Language: Simplified Chinese
- Headquarters: No. 100, Dayouzhuang, Haidian District, Beijing
- Country: China
- Website: www.studytimes.cn

Chinese name
- Simplified Chinese: 学习时报
- Traditional Chinese: 學習時報
Transcriptions
Standard Mandarin
- Hanyu Pinyin: Xuéxí Shíbào

The Study Times is the official newspaper of the Central Party School of the Chinese Communist Party (CCP). It is published by Study Times Press, a subsidiary of the Central Party School. The first issue was published in 1999, and the title of the newspaper was written by CCP General Secretary Jiang Zemin.

== History ==
Since its launch on 17 September 1999, the newspaper has attached great importance to the study of party issues, social and urban issues, put forward the concept of "learning society", and explored ways to improve the effectiveness of the CCP's newspapers and periodicals and increase their readership.

Study Times was once known for its open-mindedness and boldness. But after the leadership change in 2010, its style became increasingly conservative. Deng Yuwen was fired from the Study Times after he published an article China Should Abandon North Korea in Financial Times. Since then, he criticized that after Xi Jinping became the General Secretary, the newspaper promoted Xi's personality cult and published a large number of reports praising Xi.

== See also ==
- Newspapers and journals of the Chinese Communist Party
