= The Frog God =

- Short story by Pu Songling
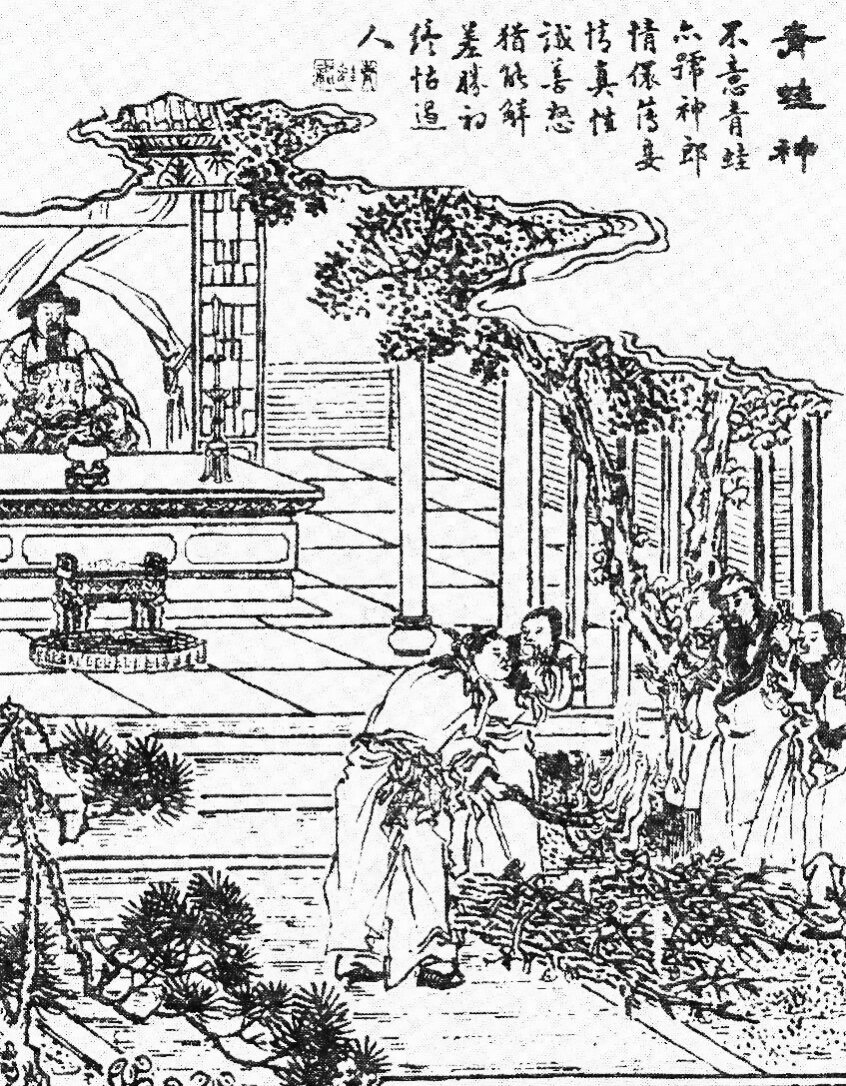
- Xue Kunsheng burning the Frog God Temple, in a 19th-century illustration from Xiangzhu liaozhai zhiyi tuyong (Liaozhai with commentary and illustrations; 1886)
- Original title: 青蛙神 (Qingwashen)
- Translator: Sidney L. Sondergard
- Country: China
- Language: Chinese
- Genres: Zhiguai; Romance

Publication
- Published in: Strange Stories from a Chinese Studio
- Publication type: Anthology
- Publication date: c. 1740
- Published in English: 2014

Chronology
The Great Sage, Heaven's Equal (齐天大圣)	Another Frog God Tale (又)

"The Frog God" (Chinese: 青蛙神; pinyin: Qīngwā Shén) is a short story by Pu Songling collected in Strange Stories from a Chinese Studio (1740). It revolves around a Chinese bachelor who encounters the locally revered frog god and his subsequent romance with its daughter. The titular frog deity makes an immediate reappearance in the following story, a semi-sequel simply titled "You" (Chinese: 又; lit. 'Again') in Chinese or "Another Frog God Tale" in the 2014 English translation by Sidney L. Sondergard.

== Plot ==
The pious people who reside in the Han river region in Hubei, China, live in fear of the almighty Frog God, who is worshipped at a frog-filled temple specially dedicated to him. The Frog God possesses divine powers and can communicate with others in their dreams. Xue Kunsheng (薛昆生), a young bachelor, is selected by the Frog God to be his daughter's future spouse; the Xue family disregards this and some time later arrange for Kunsheng to take the Jiang family's daughter as his wife. The Frog God is infuriated and the Jiang family, fearful of retribution, cancel the wedding plans.

After making an offering at the Frog God temple, Xue is summoned to meet the Frog God, who takes on the form of an old man. At that point he is introduced to his daughter, Shiniang (十娘), a frog spirit in the form of a beautiful girl who Xue instantly falls in love with. Xue's parents disapprove of the arrangement initially, but there is no conflict on the day of marriage. Xue's parents-in-law occasionally visit the household afterwards and their attire is indicative of what prosperity the Xue family is to reap – red for "happy events" and white for greater wealth. Many of Shiniang's frog relatives, in their original form, now frequent the Xue residence too.

The peace enjoyed in the family fizzles out one day, however, when Xue, in a bout of bad temper, kills a handful of frogs and criticises the Frog God for imposing a reign of terror on the Hubei people. Shiniang chastises her husband for being insensitive and ungrateful, then storms off. She returns after Xue atones for his mistakes but soon afterwards leaves again – this time after being chased away by Xue, who regards Shiniang as an unfilial wife. He protests this to the Frog God and threatens to commit arson to his temple. The Frog God, in return, offers to build a house for Xue and Shiniang reunites with him.

Yet Xue Kunsheng succeeds at driving his wife away for the third time after using snakes, traditional predators of frogs, to play a prank on her. This time she does not return, despite the Xue family's best efforts at winning her back. A year goes by and Xue receives information that Shiniang is being betrothed to the Yuan family. He is grief-stricken and becomes emaciated, until he realises Shiniang is standing by his side; she explains that she had already rejected the Yuans' dowry and gifts and had longed yearned to be back with him, against the wishes of her father, the Frog God. They reflect on their personal growth during the course of their marriage, and Shiniang reaffirms her wedding vows to Xue. The villagers start to venerate Xue, Shiniang gives birth to twin sons, and the human-amphibious lineage thrives.

== Background ==
Written by Pu Songling and originally titled "Qingwashen" (青蛙神), "The Frog God" was first collected in the 1740 publication Strange Tales from a Chinese Studio (Liaozhai), and fully translated into English by Sidney L. Sondergard in 2014. "The Frog God" is followed by "Another Frog God Tale", a separate encounter featuring the same Frog God. In the original version of Liaozhai, it has the nondescript title of "You" (Chinese: 又; lit. 'Again') which indicates a continuation, to some extent, of the previous story. The Martin Bodmer Foundation Library houses a 19th-century Liaozhai manuscript, silk-printed and bound leporello-style, that contains three tales including "The Bookworm", "The Great Sage, Heaven's Equal", and "The Frog God".

== Reception ==
The story, described as a piece of "sacred-profane love fiction", was discussed alongside "Zhu-qing", another entry in Strange Tales from a Chinese Studio, at the 5th Hawaii International Conference on Arts and Humanities in 2007; Grace Lau Yinping posits that "The Frog God" is a reflection of "realistic ... (and) different marital problems such as without posterity, marital disharmony and difficult paths of personal development." Yinde Zhang suggests that Mo Yan's Frog (2009) is "closely connected" to "The Frog God", adding that Mo "practically worshipped" Pu.
