= The Girl from Dabancheng =

Song

The Girl from Dabancheng (Chinese: 达坂城的姑娘; pinyin: Dá bǎnchéng de gūniáng), also known as "Qemberxan" (Uyghur: قەمبەرخان), is a popular Uyghur folk song about the Uyghur youth's yearning for a beautiful woman named Qemberxan.

In 1938, it was adapted into Mandarin Chinese by Wang Luobin and was sung in Lanzhou under the title "Song of the Coachman" (Chinese: 馬車夫之歌; pinyin: Mǎchē fū zhī gē). It became the first Uyghur folk song translated into Chinese in modern China. Later, Wang Luobin's lyrics were modified and the work was renamed "The Girl from Dabancheng"; some had renamed it to "The Girl from Hangzhou" with the scenery in the south of the Yangtze River. The song was later adapted in various forms. One performance of the song won an award in Pyongyang, North Korea in 2001.

One of the early recordings of the song was done by a German ethnomusicologist on the singing of a Turpan Taranchi farmer's 16-year-old daughter. The song was most likely composed by a Uyghur soldier back in the time of Yaqub Beg, when the soldier was posted from southern Xinjiang to the north (Ili) or east (Turpan). Indeed, there are many songs dated back to that time associated with a soldier's courtship, such as Havagul (mispronounced and adapted by Wang Luobin as Avargul), which talks about a girl in Ili. However, "Qemberxan" talks about a girl in Dabancheng (or Davanching in the Uyghur language) which lies between Turpan and Urumqi, and is a district of Urumqi. This district is well known as an entrepot on inter-oasis travel. The reputation of the beauty of local girls is partly due to the mixing among the different populations that traveled through it.

== Lyrics ==
=== Uyghur original ===
Uyghur Arabic alphabet

داۋانچىڭنىڭ يېرى قاتتىق تاۋۇزى تاتلىق
داۋانچىڭدا بىر يارىم بار قەمبەرخان ئاتلىق

قەمبەرخاننىغى ساچى ئۇزۇن يېرگې تېگېمدۇ
قەمبەرخاندىن سوراپ بەقىڭ ئېرگې تېگېمدۇ

ئۇششاققىنا ئۈنچىلىرىم چېچىلىپ كېتتى تېرىپ بەرسەڭچۇ
سويېي دىسېم بويۇم يېتمېش ئېگىلىپ بەرسەڭچۇ

ئاتلارىڭنى خايدايدىكېن مۇز داۋان بىلېن
بىر ياخشىنى قىينايديكېن بىر يامان بىلېن

قارىسام گۆرېنمېيدۇ داۋانچىڭدىغى قورغان
ئېجېپ بىر يامان ئىكېن قەمبەرخاندىن ئايرىلغان

Uyghur Latin alphabet

Dawanchingnighi yëri qattiq tawuzi tatliq
Dawanchingda bir yarim bar Qemberxan atliq

Qemberxannighi sachi uzun yërgë tëgëmdu
Qemberxandin sorap beqing ërgë tëgëmdu

Ushshaqqina ünchilirim chëchilip këtti tërip bersengchu
Soyëy disëm boyum yëtmës ëgilip bersengchu

Atlaringni xaydaydikën muz dawan bilën
Bir yaxshini qiynaydikën bir yaman bilën

Qarisam görënmëydu Dawanchingdighi qorghan
Ëjëp bir yaman ikën Qemberxandin ayrilghan

Uyghur Cyrillic alphabet

Даванчиңниғи ери қаттиқ тавузи татлиқ
Даванчиңда бир ярим бар Қәмбәрхан атлиқ

Қәмбәрханниғи сачи узун ерге тегеиду
Қәмбәрхандин сорап бәқиң эрге тегемду

Ушшаққина үнчилирим чечилип кетти терип бәрсәңчу
Соей дисем боюм етмес эгилип бәрсәңчу

Атлари хайдайдикен муз даван билен
Бир яхшини қийнайдикен бир яман билен

Қарисам гөренмейду Даванчиңдиғи қорған
Эҗеп бир яман икен Қәмбәрхандин айрилған

=== Lyrics by Wang Luobin ===
达坂城的石路硬又平啦 西瓜大又甜啦
那里住的的姑娘辫子长啊 两个眼睛真漂亮
你要是嫁人不要嫁给别人一定要你嫁给我
带上你的钱财连着你的妹妹赶上那马车来

=== English Translation ===
The soil of the Davanching is hard
But the water melon is sweet
My darling is in Davanching
Qambarhan is so sweet.
Qambarhan’s hair is so long

It touches the ground
Please ask darling Qambarhan
Does she want to get a husband.
My tiny pearls spilled on the ground
Please help me to pick them up

I’d like to kiss you, but can’t reach
Please bow your head down.
One can ride a horse
Around icy mountains.
One tortures a good soul

By an evil man
It is hard to see
No matter how hard I look.
The separation with Qambarhan.
Is extremely hard to endure
