= 2023 Qiqihar school gymnasium collapse =

Building collapse in Qiqihar, China

2023 Qiqihar school gym collapse
- 2023 Qiqihar school gymnasium collapse (Heilongjiang) Location of the collapse
- Date: 23 July 2023; 3 years ago
- Time: 14:56 (CST, UTC+8)
- Location: 175 Yong'an Avenue, Longsha District, Qiqihar, Heilongjiang; 47°20′9.66″N 123°56′13.04″E
- Cause: Overloading
- Deaths: 11
- Injuries: 4
- Escaped: 4

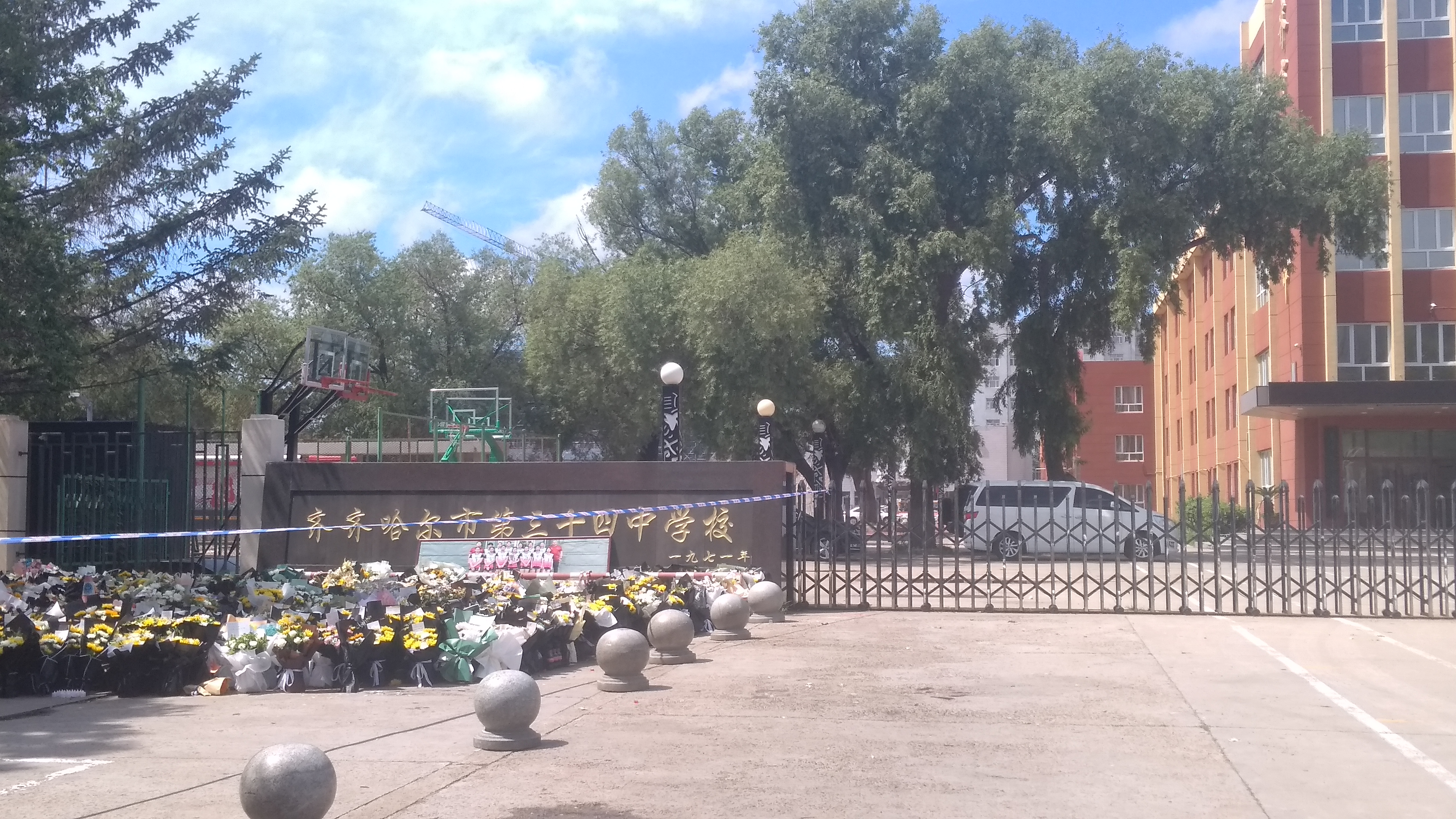
Flowers of condolence were laid at the gate of Qiqihar No 34 Middle School.

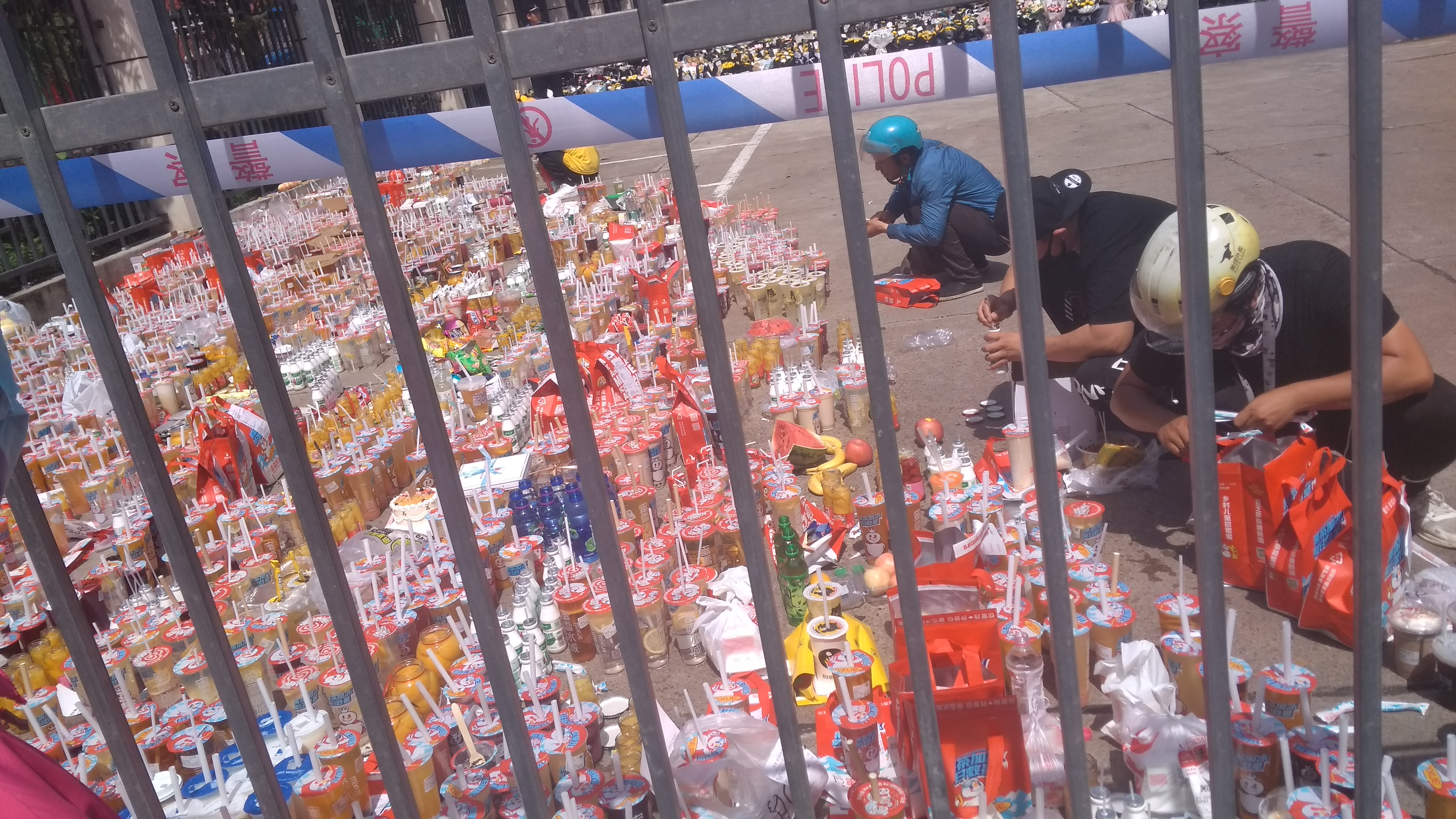
Drinks and canned yellow peaches were laid at the school gate, with flowers of condolence visible afar.

The roof of the school gymnasium of the No 34 Middle School of Qiqihar, Heilongjiang, China collapsed on 23 July 2023 at 14:56 local time, killing 11 people with another four injured.

== Background ==
The No 34 Middle School of Qiqihar is a public secondary school located in the city’s Longsha District and offers lower secondary education (Level 2). Qiqihar is a prefecture-level city with a population of about 5 million, the second-largest in the northernmost and easternmost province of China, Heilongjiang. The school’s gym that collapsed in this incident is reported to be built in 1997 with an area of 1,200 square metres.

== The collapse ==
The collapse happened on 23 July 2023 at 14:56 local time, according to the provincial fire and rescue department, reported by the Xinhua News Agency. The collapse resulted in the whole roof of the gym and the building materials made of perlite that were wrongly placed on it falling to the ground entirely. 19 people were inside the gym when the accident occurred; four managed to escape, with the rest 15 trapped; most were school children. The children are believed to be primarily students of a girls’ volleyball team of the very school or from nearby schools. Reports claim they were training at the time of the collapse, and the team practising that day had reportedly just won second place in the provincial championship. Among the 15 trapped, two were coaches, and the rest 13 were children.

== Rescue ==
39 fire trucks and 159 rescuers were sent to the scene. Eight were discovered by 17:30 local time, with six more by dawn and the last by around 10:00 the next day. Among the trapped, five were found dead upon discovery, six died despite receiving medical treatment, and the remaining four were rescued with injuries. One trapped coach was among the rescued and the other was confirmed to be dead.

== Causes of the accident and investigation ==
Upon preliminary investigation, the direct cause of the accident was believed to be improperly placed building materials on the gymnasium's roof. There was a construction project nearby, and the workers had stacked perlite on the top of the gym for the sake of convenience. A 30 mm precipitation was reported that day, which might have led to the perlite absorbing a large amount of water and resulting in the roof's overloading and collapse. The Beijing News carried an editorial to condemn the accident, criticising the lack of supervision on the construction site. Wuhan’s official newspaper, the Changjiang Daily, on the other hand, urged the local authorities in Qiqihar to investigate whether the collapsed building was a ‘tofu-dreg project’ in the first place.

It is reported that the local police have detained those involved in the adjacent construction project for further investigation. Managers of the involved construction firm are said to face criminal charges.

== Controversies ==
Sources of social media in mainland China claimed that a large number of police officers were deployed to gather the parents of the victims and kept them under watch while sharing little to no information with them. A video circulated on the internet has shown a devastated father claiming they were not updated with information for the first five to six hours, and they were not allowed to identify their children’s bodies. The claim was echoed by other parents in the video, as well as users of social platforms, criticising the lack of proper communication from the police officers, the local officials, the school, and the hospital. Online users also censured the official announcement for its over-highlighting how much effort has been made by the authorities while de-emphasising casualties.

== Reactions ==
Flowers, canned yellow peaches (Note: It is a local custom representing wellwishes.), candles, and drinks were laid at the front gate of the school starting the next day to convey people’s condolences; some were brought by the locals, while some were laid by couriers on behalf of remote mourners.

Officials of Qiqihar apologised to the public over the accident.

== See also ==
- Collapse of Xinjia Express Hotel
- Tofu-dreg project
