= Wutong Shen =

Group of five evil Chinese gods

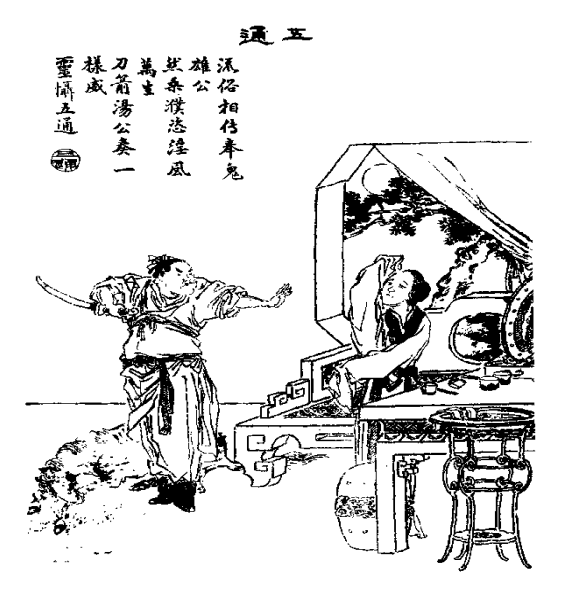
19th-century illustration of a scene from the short story "The Wutong Spirits" collected in Strange Tales from a Chinese Studio (1740)

Wutong Shen (五通神) or Wulang Shen (五郎神) are a group of five sinister deities from the southern region of China. Their cult began in the Tang dynasty and are usually depicted as one-legged demons. By nature wanton and lascivious, the Wutong often disguised themselves as handsome gentlemen to seduce unsuspecting and vulnerable women. Women who were ravished or possessed by these creatures lost consciousness and endured painful fits and convulsions lasting for days, even weeks, which often brought them to the brink of death.

== As a controversial deity ==
Wutong are gods of sudden, undeserved wealth who grant money to husbands in exchange for their wives’ favors. However, the slightest offense would cause the spirits to repossess whatever largesse they had granted.

In 1685, Tang Bin 湯斌 (1627–1687), the governor of the province of Jiangsu, undertook the destruction of the Wutong temples at Suzhou, the provincial capital, and then throughout the entire province, with the aim of reforming local customs and practices. The fact that women participated voluntarily or involuntarily (through possession) in these cults was a determining factor in these campaigns.

Aside from their diabolical nature, some regions in China worshiped them as benevolent deities who brought relief from the scourge of plagues.

== Legends ==
Based on an episode recorded in Tales of the Listener (Yijian Zhi), there was a certain gentleman surnamed Wu, a former sandal-maker who struck it rich as a vegetable oil dealer, raising the suspicions of his neighbors. When thieves looted the houses of several local notables, people accused Wu of the crimes. Under torture, Wu confessed that he had been visited by a one-legged spirit who offered him munificent rewards in exchange for sacrifices. After being released, Wu renovated a defunct one-legged Wutong shrine, where he held nocturnal rites involving extravagant “bloody sacrifices”, during which his entire family sat, “heedless of rank”, naked in the dark. Such indecency, according to local lore, enabled the Wutong spirit to have his pleasure with Wu's wife, who bore the deity's offspring. Many years later, Wu's eldest son married an official's daughter, but the well-bred wife refused to participate in these rites. Denied this sexual conquest, the god angrily visited pestilence upon the Wu household. Only after Wu and his wife, along with the resolute daughter-in-law, fall ill and die and their hoard of cash is scattered by violent winds, does the Wu family regret their blasphemous idolatry and halt their sacrifices to Wutong.

Other stories of Wutong were also included in Liaozhai Zhiyi (Strange Tales from a Chinese Studio) by Pu Songling (1679), specifically in the short story "The Wutong Spirits". According to chapter 408, the sinister Wutong (identified here as the fourth of the five spirits) forcibly imposes himself on the women, raping one and demanding the other in marriage in exchange for one hundred taels of silver. Finally the Wutong spirit is driven off by Wan the demon slayer, who cuts off one of his legs, leaving the spirit to hobble off encumbered by his trademark handicap.

Based on chapter eight of Zibuyu (What The Master Would Not Discuss), a local man, disgusted by the fact that a statue of Wutong in a Buddhist monastery in Nanjing stood in a position superior to that of Guandi (Guan Yu), took the liberty of moving the statues to reverse their hierarchical order. That night the man was visited by an enraged spirit who identified himself as the “Great King Wutong.” The spirit said that although he was powerless against exalted and righteous officials like Tang Bin and Yin Jishan, he would not forgive this “petty town dweller” (shijing xiaoren) for his insolent act of desecration. The man collapsed, raving, and despite the efforts of his family members to appease the god with sacrifices, he died shortly afterward.

== In popular culture ==
Wu Tong became the main antagonist in the 1991 Hong Kong movie Liaozhai yantan xu ji zhi Wutong shen (Erotic Ghost Story 2).
