= Zai Na Yaoyuan De Difang =

Song
- Language: Chinese
- Songwriter: Wang Luobin

"Zai Na Yaoyuan De Difang" (simplified Chinese: 在那遥远的地方; traditional Chinese: 在那遙遠的地方) is the title and first line of a Chinese song written by Wang Luobin, a Chinese songwriter and ethnic music researcher.

== History ==
Wang Luobin wrote the song in 1939 in Qinghai while shooting a film near Qinghai Lake. He met a young Tibetan girl, and wrote a song about the beautiful impression that she left upon him and all those around her. The song is set to the tune of "Qayran Jalğan" (Қайран жалған), a Kazakh folk song that Wang had collected in the area.

It became one of the most popular songs in China and one of the best known Chinese songs in many countries. Wang Luobin first named this song as "The Grassland Love Song" (草原情歌), but the song has later become better known by its first line of the lyrics, "Zai Na Yaoyuan De Difang". The song is extremely popular in Japan where it is called "Love Song of the Steppe" (草原情歌, Sōgen jōka).

Various English-language sources use different translations of the song's title. China Daily, Ministry of Culture of China, China Central Television, and China Radio International translated the name into "In That Place Wholly Faraway". Beijing Review and a Newcastle University academic Joanna Smith Finley translated it into "In That Faraway Place". Xinhua News Agency translated it into "In a Faraway Fairyland". WaterFire, University of Queensland, and Scotland-China Association translated it into "In That Distant Place". Su Xiaokang translated it into "In a Land Far Far Away". A University of Toronto academic Joshua D. Pilzer translated it into "In That Far-Off Land". An Indian historian Sarvepalli Gopal translated it into "In That Remote Place".
