= Tian, Iran =

Tian (Persian: تيان), also rendered as Tayun, may refer to:

- Tian, Azna, Lorestan Province
- Tian, Khorramabad, Lorestan Province
