= Lift Your Veil =

"Lift Your Veil" (Chinese: 掀起你的蓋頭來; pinyin: xiān qǐ le nǐ de gài tou lái), also called "Lift Up Your Veil and Let Me See Your Face", is a traditional Uyghur folk song from the Xinjiang province of China. It was originally written in the Uyghur language. Its words were translated into the Chinese language and popularized in China by the Han Chinese songwriter Wang Luobin. The song was used by Chinese artistic gymnast Jiang Yuyuan for her floor exercise routines in a number of elite international competitions, including the 2008 Summer Olympics, at which her national team won the all-around gold medal. It was also sung by Uyghur singer Erkin Abdulla at the 2005 CCTV Spring Festival Celebration in collaboration with another music group.
