= The Wutong Spirits =

18th century short story by Pu Songling

- Short story by Pu Songling
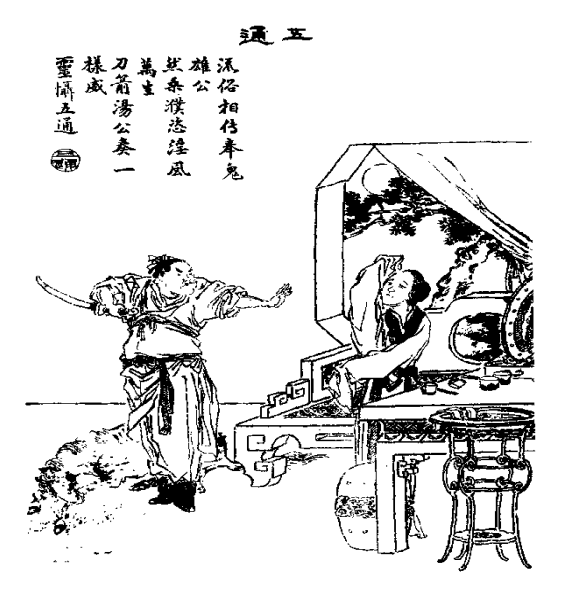
- 19th-century illustration from Xiangzhu liaozhai zhiyi tuyong (Liaozhai Zhiyi with commentary and illustrations; 1886)
- Original title: 五通 (Wutong)
- Translator: John Minford (2006)
- Country: China
- Language: Chinese
- Genres: Zhiguai; Chuanqi; Short story

Publication
- Published in: Strange Tales from a Chinese Studio
- Media type: Print (Book)
- Publication date: 1740

Chronology
Coral (珊瑚)	Another Wutong Spirit (又)

"The Wutong Spirits" (Chinese: 五通; pinyin: Wǔ tōng) is a short story by Pu Songling first published in Strange Tales from a Chinese Studio. It follows locals in Southern China who are terrorised by one of the Wutong Shen, a group of five malevolent spirits. The antagonist reappears in the following Strange Tales story titled "Another Wutong Spirit".

== Plot ==
The Wutong that roams regions as Jiangsu and Zhejiang is the southern counterpart of the northern fox spirit. Unlike the fox, however, the Wutong is far less easy to exorcise. This allows him to forcibly impose himself upon women, with their parents and husbands unable to defend them. One night, Yan (阎), the wife of Wu pawnbroker Zhao Hong (赵弘), is raped by a Wutong spirit named "Fourth Master" (四郎), who tells her that he will return in five days.

Zhao learns of his wife's ordeal, after returning home from work, but is both too afraid and ashamed to do anything. Fourth Master returns on the fifth day, this time with two of his brothers. Yan is coerced into drinking with the Wutong spirits; thereafter Fourth Master rapes her till she loses consciousness. After he leaves, Yan repeatedly tries to commit suicides by hanging but the rope keeps breaking.

This goes on for some two or three months, putting a strain on Yan's marriage. One night, Zhao's brother Wan (万) decides to pay Zhao a visit, only to find a stranger in his sister-in-law's room. He immediately kills the stranger with a knife and discovers that he was a small horse spirit. The remaining four Wutong spirits soon arrive at the scene and being a skilled archer, Wan fatally shoots one of them, who is revealed to be a boar spirit. He then knifes to death a third spirit, also a boar, before informing Zhao. They enjoy a meal of horse meat and pork; the last two Wutong spirits fall off the grid for the following month.

Having earned the reputation of Wutong slayer, Wan is hired by a Suzhou wood merchant to get rid of a Wutong spirit who has demanded to marry his daughter in exchange for a dowry of one thousand silver taels. Wan promptly confronts the spirit and hacks off one of his legs. The spirit flees to the river, and Wan later marries the merchant's daughter. The fifth Wutong spirit permanently goes into hiding. In his postscript, Pu Songling praises the heroism of Wan.

== Publication history ==
Echoing the Song dynasty writer Hong Mai, Pu Songling wrote of the parallel between fox spirits and the Wutong: "There are Wutong spirits in the south, just like there are foxes in the north." It was common sentiment in Pu's era that the Wutong and the fox were "interchangeable identities". Originally titled "Wutong" (五通), the story was first published in Pu's anthology Strange Tales from a Chinese Studio. The French translation of "Wutong" was first included in the thirteenth volume of Bulletin des Etudes Indochinoises and subsequently in a 1940 Saigon publication titled Cinquantes contes chinois extraits du Leao-tchai Tche-yi. The story was later translated into English as "The Southern-Wutong Spirit" by John Minford and published in his translation of Strange Tales in 2006. Sidney Sondergard subsequently translated it as "The Wutong Spirits" along with the accompanying "Another Wutong Spirit", both of which were included in the fifth volume of Strange Tales from Liaozhai.
