= Deng Yuwen =

Chinese journalist, writer and commentator

- 邓聿文
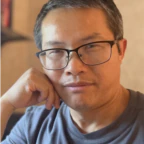
- Born: March 16, 1968 (age 58); Xinyu, Jiangxi, China
- Occupations: Journalist, writer, commentator
- Writing career
- Language: Chinese
- Notable works: The Right to be Happy; China Must Win; China's Economic Breakthrough

Chinese name
- Traditional Chinese: 鄧聿文
- Simplified Chinese: 邓聿文
Transcriptions
Standard Mandarin
- Hanyu Pinyin: Dèng Yùwén

Deng Yuwen (Chinese: 邓聿文; born 16 March 1968) is a Chinese journalist, writer and commentator on current events. He was an editor of the Study Times. He is a visiting scholar at the Institute of China Policy at the University of Nottingham.

== Biography ==
Deng was born in Xinyu, Jiangxi on March 16, 1968. In 2012, he wrote The Political Legacy of Hu Jintao and Wen Jiabao, criticizing the government's policies. In March 2013, he published an article China Should Abandon North Korea in Financial Times, which caused him to lose his job in the Study Times.

== Works ==
- The Right to be Happy (幸福的权利)
- China Must Win (中国必须赢)
- China's Economic Breakthrough (中国经济大突围)
- The Last Totalitarian (最后的极权）
