= Longsha District =

Longsha District 龙沙区
- District
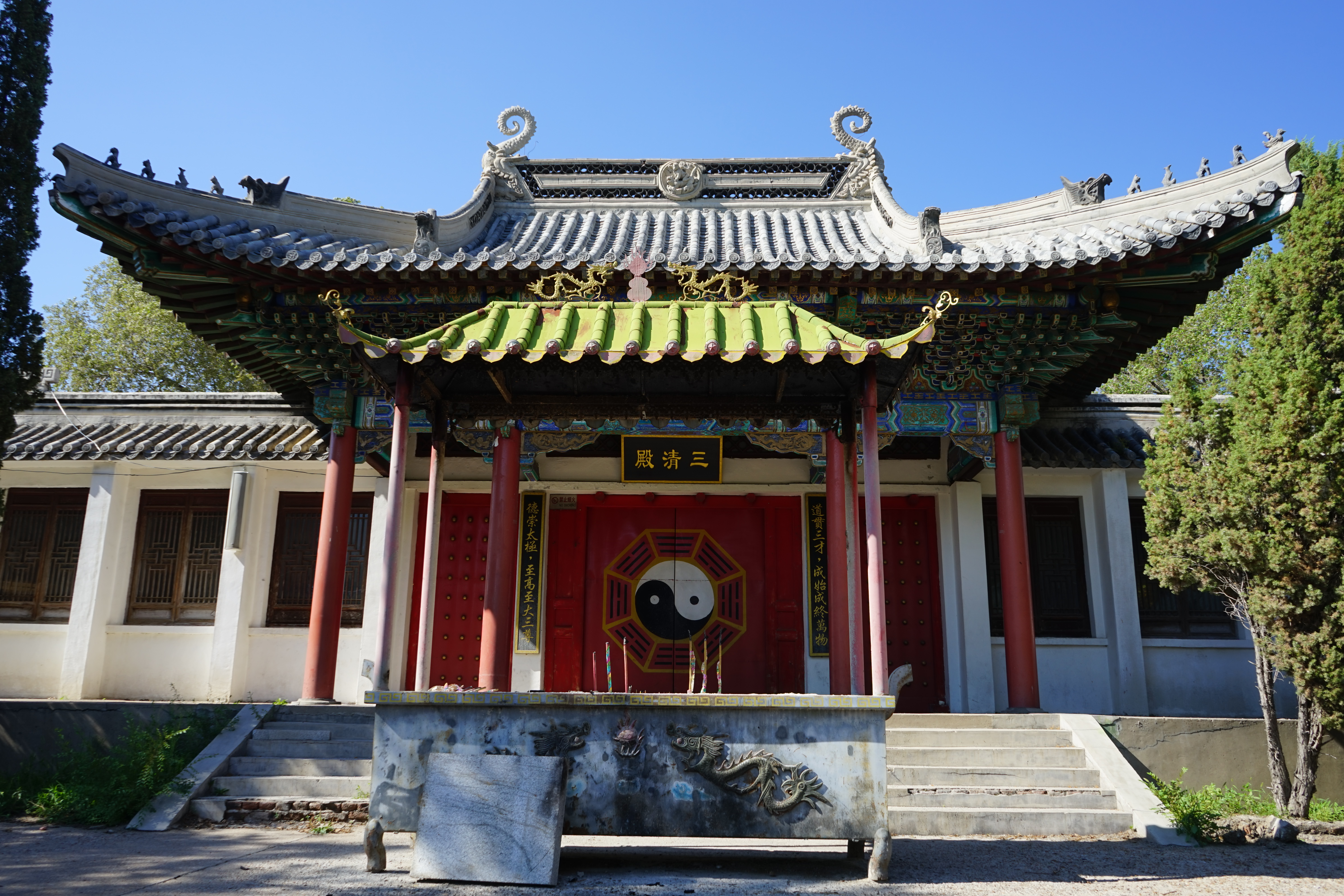
- Sanqing palace in the temple of Guanyu, Longsha Park

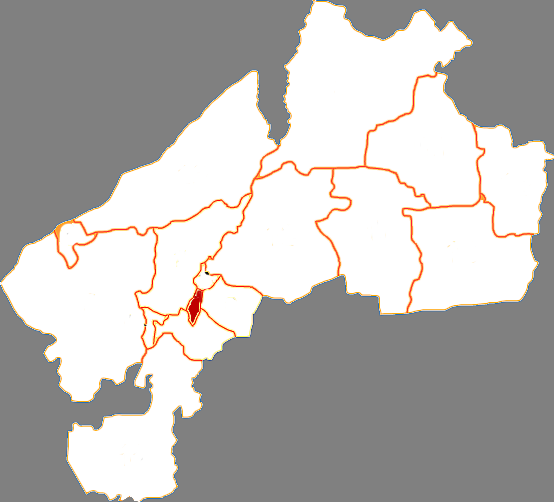
- Location of Longsha District in Qiqihar

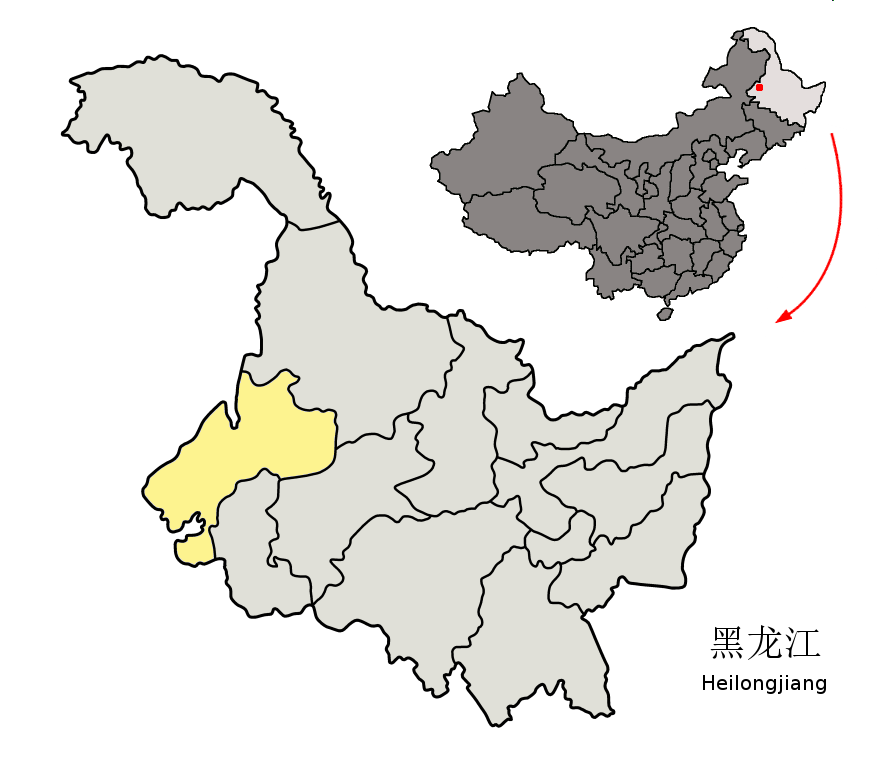
- Qiqihar in Heilongjiang
- Coordinates: 47°19′03″N 123°57′27″E
- Country: China
- Province: Heilongjiang
- Prefecture-level city: Qiqihar
- District seat: Nanhang Subdistrict

Area
  - Total: 283 km^{2} (109 sq mi)

Population (2020 census)
  - Total: 355,849
  - Density: 1,260/km^{2} (3,260/sq mi)
- Time zone: UTC+8 (China Standard)
- Postal code: 161005
- Website: www.qqhrlsq.gov.cn

Longsha District (simplified Chinese: 龙沙区; traditional Chinese: 龍沙區; pinyin: Lóngshā Qū) is a district of the city of Qiqihar, Heilongjiang, China.

== Administrative subdivisions ==
Longsha District is divided into 7 subdistricts.

- Wulong Subdistrict (五龙街道)
- Hubin Subdistrict (湖滨街道)
- Jiang'an Subdistrict (江安街道)
- Zhengyang Subdistrict (正阳街道)
- Caihong Subdistrict (彩虹街道)
- Nanhang Subdistrict (南航街道)
- Damin Subdistrict (大民街道)
