= Tian (surname) =

- Stroke order of the character Tian (田)

Other names
- Variant form: Jeon

Tián (田), or T'ien in Wade-Giles is a Chinese surname. An alternative transliteration of "田" from Cantonese is Tin, from Hokkien is Thinn. It appeared in the Hundred Family Surnames text from the early Song dynasty. It also means "field". In 2019 it was the 34th most common surname in mainland China.

The same character is Jeon in Korean hanja.

== Origins ==
- perhaps from a fief called Tian (田), which in Old Chinese is pronounced similar to (陳) in Qi state. Assuming pronunciation of Tian in Old Chinese remains identical to today, the closest pronunciation of 陳 should be 'Tan', the Hokkien form. This surname was granted to Chen Wan (陳完), a prince in the State of Chen, who fled to Qi to escape persecution. The Qi clan also went on to rule Qi for many generations.
- possibly dates even further back to the post name of an official in charge of the management of farmlands who served the Shang dynasty.
- adopted in place of the Chinese surname Huang (黃) by the son of the official Huang Zicheng during the Ming dynasty, in order to avoid persecution.

== Notable people ==
- Tian Bingyi (born 1963), Chinese men's badminton player and 1992 Olympic medallist
- Tian Bu (785–822), military general of the Chinese Tang dynasty
- Tian Chengping (born 1945), Chinese communist politician
- Tian Chengsi (705–779), military general of the Chinese rebel state Yan
- Tien Chung-kwang, Deputy Minister of Foreign Affairs of the Republic of China (2020-)
- Tian Dan (fl. 300 BC), military general during ancient China's Warring States period
- Tian Feng (died 200), advisor to Yuan Shao during the late Han dynasty
- Tian Fengshan (born 1940), Chinese communist official
- Gang Tian (born 1958), Chinese-American mathematician
- Tian Han (1898–1968), Chinese revolutionary lyricist and playwright
- Tian Hongzheng (764–821), military general during the Chinese Tang dynasty
- Tian Houwei (born 1992), Chinese men's badminton player
- Hebe Tien (born 1983), Taiwanese Mando-pop singer
- Tian Huaijian (fl. 800), military general during the Chinese Tang dynasty
- Tian Ji (fl. 300 BC), military general of the Qi state during the early Warring States period
- Tian Jia (born 1981), Chinese female beach volleyball player
- Tian Ji'an (781 or 782–812), military general during the Chinese Tang dynasty
- Tin Ka Ping or Tian Jiabing (1919–2018), Hong Kong entrepreneur and philanthropist
- Tian Jianxia (born 1986), Chinese men's handball player
- Tian Jiyun (born 1929), Chinese communist politician
- Tian Jun (858–903), warlord during the late Chinese Tang dynasty
- Tian Jun (rower) (born 1982), Chinese male rower
- Tian Kai (died 199), Chinese official in Qing Province during the Chinese Tang dynasty
- Tian Kehan, honorific name used to refer to various Chinese leaders
- Tian Liang (rower) (born 1986), Chinese female Olympic rower
- Tian Liang (born 1979), Chinese male diver and two-time Olympic champion
- Tian Lingzi (died 893), eunuch during the reign of Emperor Xizong of Tang
- Tian Mingjian (1964–1994), Chinese First Lieutenant and spree killer
- Tian Pengfei (born 1987), Chinese male snooker player
- Tian Qing (born 1986), Chinese women's badminton player
- Tian Songyao (1888–1975), Chinese warlord of the Sichuan clique and later Kuomintang general
- Tian Tian (chess player) (born 1983), Chinese female chess grandmaster
- Tian Wang, honorific name used to refer to various Chinese leaders
- Tian Xiusi (born 1950), Chinese communist politician and military general
- Tian Xiwei (born 1997), Chinese actress
- Tian Xu, military general during the late Chinese Han dynasty
- Tian Xu (Tang dynasty) (764–796), military general during the Chinese Tang dynasty
- Tian Ye (born 1972), Chinese former football goalkeeper
- Tian Ye (born 1982), male Chinese cross-country skier and biathlete
- Tian Yi (1534–1605), Ming dynasty court eunuch
- Tian Yu (171–252), military general of the state of Cao Wei
- Tian Yue (751–784), military general during the Chinese Tang dynasty
- Tian Yunzhang (born 1945), Chinese calligrapher and academic
- Tian Yuan (singer) (born 1985), Chinese musician and actress
- Tian Yuan (table tennis) (born 1975), Chinese-Croatian table tennis player
- Tian Yuan (weightlifter) (born 1993), Chinese female weightlifter
- Tian Yumei (born 1965), Chinese former sprint athlete
- Tian Zhen (born 1966), Chinese rock singer
- Zhiting Tian, Chinese-American mechanical engineer
- Tian Zhuangzhuang (born 1952), Chinese film director and producer
- Chang-Lin Tien or Tian Changlin (1935–2002), Chancellor of the University of California, Berkeley (1990–97)
- James Tien (actor), Chinese actor
- James Tien (politician) (born 1947), Hong Kong businessman and politician, current Chairman of the Liberal Party
- Michael Tien, brother of James Tien (politician)
- John Tien, American military and government official

== Fictional characters ==
- Tian Hu, antagonist in the Water Margin
- Tian Qilang, protagonist of a short story with the same name in Strange Tales from a Chinese Studio

== See also ==
- Tian (given name)
- Rulers of Zhou Feudal State of Qi
- Tian (disambiguation)
