= Tian, Khorramabad =

Tian طيان
- Village
- Location within Iran
- Coordinates: 33°13′27″N 48°35′09″E
- Country: Iran
- Province: Lorestan
- County: Khorramabad
- Bakhsh: Papi
- Rural District: Keshvar

Population (2006)
  - Total: 27
- Time zone: UTC+3:30 (IRST)
  - Summer (DST): UTC+4:30 (IRDT)

Tian (Persian: طيان, also Romanized as Ţīān) is a village in Keshvar Rural District, Papi District, Khorramabad County, Lorestan Province, Iran. As of the 2006 census, its population was 27 with there being 5 families.
