= Tian (given name) =

Tian is a male given name of South African and Chinese origin. Notable people with the name include:

== Real people ==
- Jing Tian (born 1988), Chinese actress
- Xie Tian (1914–2003), Chinese actor and director
- Tian Meyer (born 1988), South African rugby union footballer
- Tian Viljoen (born 1961), South African former tennis player

== Fictional characters ==
- Jing Tian (景天), a character in the video game by Softstar Entertainment Chinese Paladin 3 and the same title television series

== See also ==
- Tian (surname), a common Chinese language surname
