= Tien =

Tien may refer to:

- Tian, also known as Tien or T'ien, the Chinese religious idea of God or heaven
- Tian (surname), also romanized as Tien
- Tien (TV channel), a Dutch television channel
- Tiền, currency used in Vietnam during the 19th and 20th centuries
- Tiền River, branch of the Mekong through Vietnam
- Tien Shinhan or Tien, a fictional character in the Dragon Ball manga series

== See also ==
- Ten (disambiguation)
- Tiens Biotech Group
