= Pu Songling =

Chinese writer (1640–1715)

- Born: 5 June 1640; Zibo, Shandong, Ming China
- Died: 25 February 1715 (aged 74)
- Occupation: Writer
- Writing career
- Language: Classical Chinese
- Period: Qing dynasty
- Subject: Chinese literature
- Notable work: Strange Tales from a Chinese Studio (Liaozhai zhiyi)

Pu Songling
- Traditional Chinese: 蒲松齡
- Simplified Chinese: 蒲松龄
Transcriptions
Standard Mandarin
- Hanyu Pinyin: Pú Sōnglíng
- Wade–Giles: P'u^{2} Sung^{1}-ling^{2}
- IPA: [pʰǔ sʊ́ŋ.lǐŋ]

Pu Songling (Chinese: 蒲松齡, 5 June 1640 – 25 February 1715) was a Chinese writer during the Qing dynasty, best known as the author of Strange Tales from a Chinese Studio (Liaozhai zhiyi).

== Biography ==
A 1935 publication of Pu Songling's non-fiction prose works and essays

A comprehensive collected edition of Pu Songling's non-fiction and alternative writings, poetry, and notes

Pu was born into a poor merchant family from Zichuan (淄川, in Zibo, Shandong). At the age of 18, he received the Xiucai degree in the Imperial examination. It was not until he was 71 that he was awarded the Gongsheng ("tribute student") degree for his achievement in literature rather than for passing the Imperial exam.

He spent most of his life working as a private tutor, collecting stories that were later published in Strange Tales from a Chinese Studio in 1740. Some critics attribute the Vernacular Chinese novel Xingshi Yinyuan Zhuan (Marriage Destinies to Awaken the World) to him.

== Translations of his work ==
- Strange Tales from Liaozhai, 6 volumes (tr. Sidney L. Sondergard). Jain Pub Co., 2008-2014. ISBN 978-0-89581-001-4.
- Strange Tales from a Chinese Studio (tr. John Minford). London: Penguin, 2006. 562 pages. ISBN 0-14-044740-7.
- Strange Tales from the Liaozhai Studio (Zhang Qingnian, Zhang Ciyun and Yang Yi). Beijing: People's China Publishing, 1997. ISBN 7-80065-599-7.
- Strange Tales from Make-do Studio (Denis C. & Victor H. Mair). Beijing: Foreign Languages Press, 1989.
- Strange Tales of Liaozhai (Lu Yunzhong, Chen Tifang, Yang Liyi, and Yang Zhihong). Hong Kong: Commercial Press, 1982.
- Strange Stories from the Lodge of Leisures (George Soulié). London: Constable, 1913.
- Strange Stories from a Chinese Studio (tr. Herbert A. Giles). London: T. De La Rue, 1880. ISBN 1-4212-4855-7.
- The Emperor of China in a House of Ill Repute: Songs of the Imperial Visit to Datong (tr. Wilt L. Idema). Oxford University Press, 2023.

== In popular culture ==
- In The Knight of Shadows: Between Yin and Yang (2019), Jackie Chan portrays Pu Songling.
- Dao Lang has released an album based on his folk stories, called "There are Few Folk Songs" (山歌寥哉). The tracklist includes "Luosha Haishi" (罗刹海市), a song based on The Raksha Country and the Sea Market, which is compared to "Gangnam Style" for its virality and watching records.

== Sources ==
- Encyclopædia Britannica 2005 Ultimate Reference Suite DVD, Pu Sung-ling
- Death of Woman Wang 1978, Johnathon D Spence
