= List of Journey to the West characters =

The following is a list of characters in the Chinese classical 16th century novel Journey to the West, including those mentioned by name only.

== Main characters ==
- Sun Wukong (孫悟空), better known as the Monkey King in translations, is a monkey born from a stone on Mount Huaguo who acquires magic powers by learning from Master Bodhi. After starting a rebellion against Heaven, he is subdued and imprisoned under a mountain by the Buddha for 500 years. After his release, he agrees to become a disciple of the monk Tang Sanzang and protect the latter on his quest to obtain sutras from Tianzhu and bring them back to the Tang Empire.
- Tang Sanzang (唐三藏), based on the historical figure Xuanzang (玄奘), is a Buddhist monk who is the reincarnation of Golden Cicada (金蟬子), a disciple of the Buddha. After taking an oath of brotherhood with Emperor Taizong of the Tang Empire, he is sent by the emperor on a quest to Tianzhu to bring Buddhist sutras back to the Tang Empire.
- Zhu Bajie (豬八戒), also known by his Buddhist name Zhu Wuneng (豬悟能), is originally the Marshal of the Heavenly Canopy (天蓬元帥) who was banished from Heaven for attempting to seduce Chang'e and reincarnated as a humanoid monster with a pig's head. He becomes Tang Sanzang's second disciple and accompanies the monk on his quest for the sutras as a means of atoning for his past sins.
- Sha Wujing (沙悟淨), is originally a Curtain-Lifting General (捲簾大將) who was banished from Heaven for breaking a goblet or vase during a festival and reincarnated as a hideous-looking humanoid monster living in Flowing Sand River (流沙河). Later, he is told by Guanyin that he has a chance to redeem himself by protecting Tang Sanzang on his quest for the sutras. He initially fights with Sun Wukong and Zhu Bajie when they arrive, but after learning that they are Tang Sanzang's disciples, he asks them to bring him to their master and becomes Tang Sanzang's third disciple.
- The White Dragon Horse (白龍馬) is the third son of Ao Run, the Dragon King of the West Sea. He was originally supposed to be executed for accidentally destroying a pearl gifted by the Jade Emperor, but Guanyin saved him and brought him to Yingchou Stream (鷹愁澗) in Shepan Mountain (蛇盤山). When Tang Sanzang and Sun Wukong pass by the stream, the Dragon devours Tang Sanzang's horse and retreats after realising he is no match for Sun Wukong. Later, the Dragon transforms into the White Dragon Horse to serve as Tang Sanzang's steed for the rest of his journey.

== Buddhist pantheon ==
- The Buddha, referred to as Tathāgata Buddha (如來佛祖) in the novel, is based in Leiyin Temple (雷音寺; 'Thunder Sound Temple') on Vulture Peak in the Western Pure Land. When Sun Wukong is wreaking havoc in Heaven, the Buddha shows up to subdue him and imprison him under a mountain for 500 years. During their journey to Leiyin Temple, the protagonists have to occasionally seek help from the Buddha to deal with certain yaoguai along the way. At the end of their quest, the protagonists obtain the scriptures from the Buddha.
  - Ananda (阿難) and Mahākāśyapa (伽葉) are the Buddha's disciples who have been instructed to pass the scriptures to the protagonists. When they ask for offerings in return for the scriptures, Tang Sanzang has nothing to offer them so they give him blank copies of the scriptures instead.
  - Mahamayuri (孔雀明王) is the Golden Winged Great Peng's sister and the Buddha's godmother. Both of them were born to the Fenghuang.
  - The Eight Wisdom Kings (八大金剛) and the Four Heavenly Kings (四大天王) stand guard at Leiyin Temple.
    - The Eight Wisdom Kings:
      - Kuṇḍali (军荼利明王)
      - Padanakṣipa (步擲明王)
      - Acala (不动明王)
      - Yamāntaka (大威德金剛)
      - Trailokyavijaya (降三世明王)
      - Aparājita (無能勝明王)
      - Mahācakra (大輪明王)
      - Hayagrīva (馬頭觀音)
    - The Four Heavenly Kings:
      - Vaiśravaṇa (多聞天王)
      - Virūḍhaka (增長天王)
      - Dhṛtarāṣṭra (持國天王)
      - Virūpākṣa (廣目天王)
  - The Eighteen Arhats (十八羅漢)
    - The Arhat Who Rides a Deer (騎鹿羅漢)
    - The Joyous Arhat (喜慶羅漢)
    - The Arhat Raising an Alms Bowl (舉鉢羅漢)
    - The Arhat Who Holds a Pagoda (托塔羅漢)
    - The Arhat Who Meditates (靜坐羅漢)
    - The Arhat Who Crossed Rivers (過江羅漢)
    - The Arhat Astride an Elephant (騎象羅漢)
    - The Arhat Who Plays With a Lion (笑獅羅漢)
    - The Arhat Who Reveals His Heart (開心羅漢)
    - The Long-Armed Arhat (長手羅漢)
    - The Arhat Deep in Thought (沈思羅漢)
    - The Arhat Who Cleans His Ears (挖耳羅漢)
    - The Cloth Bag Arhat (布袋羅漢)
    - The Banana Arhat (芭蕉羅漢)
    - The Arhat With Long Eyebrows (長眉羅漢)
    - The Gatekeeper Arhat (看門羅漢)
    - The Arhat Who Mastered a Dragon (降龍羅漢)
    - The Arhat Who Tamed a Tiger (伏虎羅漢)
  - The Guardians of the Five Positions (五方揭諦)
    - Vairocana (大日如來)
    - Akṣobhya (阿閦佛)
    - Ratnasambhava (寶生如來)
    - Amitābha (阿彌陀佛)
    - Amoghasiddhi (不空成就佛)
  - The Twenty-Four Protective Deities (二十四諸天)
    - Maheśvara (大自在天)
    - Chandra (月宮天子)
    - Guhyapāda (密跡金剛)
    - Pañcika (散脂大將)
    - Skanda (韋馱菩薩)
    - Pṛthvī (堅牢地天)
    - Spirit of the Bodhi Tree (菩提樹神)
    - Hārītī (鬼子母)
    - Mārīcī (摩利支天)
    - Sāgara (娑竭羅龍王)
    - Yama (閻羅王)
    - Kinnara King (緊那羅王)
    - Emperor Zi Wei (紫微大帝)
    - Emperor Dongyue (東嶽大帝)
    - The Thunder God (雷公)
  - The Eighteen Sangharama (一十八位護教伽藍)
- Avalokiteśvara Bodhisattva (觀世音菩薩), better known as Guanyin Bodhisattva (觀音菩薩) or simply Guanyin (觀音) in the novel, is based on Mount Potalaka. During their quest, the protagonists seek help from Guanyin from time to time to deal with yaoguai that they cannot overcome, such as Great King of Numinous Power and Sai Tai Sui.
- Lingji Bodhisattva (靈吉菩薩), who might be based on Mahasthamaprapta, shows up to help the protagonists deal with the Yellow Wind Demon.
- Manjusri Bodhisattva (文殊菩薩) shows up to help the protagonists deal with the Lion-Lynx Demon and Azure Lion, which are actually the Azure Lion he rides on.
- Maitreya Buddha (彌勒佛) shows up to help the protagonists deal with the Yellow Brows Great King.
- Ksitigarbha Bodhisattva (地藏菩薩) offers his steed, the Diting (諦聽), to help in distinguishing between Sun Wukong and the Six-Eared Macaque when the latter pretends to be Sun Wukong.
  - Ox-Head and Horse-Face (牛頭馬臉)
- Pilanpo Bodhisattva (毗藍婆菩薩), who might be based on Ākāśagarbha, shows up to help the protagonists deal with the Hundred-Eyed Demon Lord. She is also the mother of the Sun Rooster of Hairy Head, one of the 28 Mansions.
- Samantabhadra Bodhisattva (普賢菩薩) shows up to help the protagonists deal with the Yellow Toothed Elephant, which is actually the White Elephant he rides on.
- Zen Master Wuchao (烏巢禪師), who might be based on Niaoke Daolin, teaches Tang Sanzang the Heart Sutra.
- Dipankara Buddha (燃燈古佛) sends his disciple Baixiong Zunzhe (白雄尊者) to inform the protagonists that Ananda and Mahākāśyapa had given them blank copies of the scriptures.
- Guoshiwang Bodhisattva (國師王菩薩), who might be based on Sangha, subdued the Shuimu a long time ago when it was causing trouble in Si Prefecture.
  - Little Crown Prince Zhang (小張太子) is Guoshiwang Bodhisattva's disciple. Under his command are the Four Great Divine Generals (四大神將).

== Taoist pantheon ==
- The Jade Emperor (玉皇大帝), who is based in the celestial palace in Heaven, is the supreme ruler of the Three Realms.
- The Lishan Laomu (驪山老母), in the novel, is the matriarch deity in the Taoist pantheon. She disguised herself as a grieving widow and helped Sun Wukong seek the help of Pilanpo, in order to defeat the Hundred-Eyed Demon Lord.
- The Queen Mother of the West (西王母), also referred to as Lady Queen Mother (王母娘娘) in the novel, is the matriarch deity in the Taoist pantheon. She reports Sun Wukong to the Jade Emperor for stealing the peaches meant for a feast she is hosting.
- The Three Pure Ones (三清) are the three highest ranked deities in the Taoist pantheon:
  - Yuanshi Tianzun (元始天尊)
  - Lingbao Tianzun (靈寶天尊)
  - Daode Tianzun (道德天尊), often referred to as Taishang Laojun (太上老君) in the novel, manages to subdue Sun Wukong when he is wreaking havoc in Heaven. Sun Wukong is then trapped in Taishang Laojun's bagua furnace for 49 days to be destroyed, but he survives and acquires the "Fiery Golden Eye" ability instead. Later, when the protagonists are on their quest, Taishang Laojun occasionally shows up to help them deal with some yaoguai they encounter along the way.
- Xuanwu (玄武), also known as Zhenwu Great Emperor (真武大帝)
  - The Turtle and Snake Generals (龜蛇二將) serve under Xuanwu
    - Taixuan Shuijing Heiling Zunshen (太玄水精黑靈尊神)
    - Taixuan Huojing Chiling Zunshen (太玄火精赤靈尊神)
- The Six Ding and Six Jia (Chinese: 六丁六甲)
  - The Six Ding (六丁)
    - Jade Maiden of Yin (陰神玉女)
    - Sima Qing of Dingmao (丁卯神司馬卿)
    - Cui Juqing of Dingyi (丁已神崔巨卿)
    - Shi Shutong of Dingwei (丁未神石叔通)
    - Zang Wengong of Dingyou (丁酉神臧文公)
    - Zhang Wentong of Dinghai (丁亥神張文通)
    - Zhao Ziyu of Dingchou (丁丑神趙子玉)
  - The Six Jia (六甲)
    - Jade Man of Yang (陽神玉男)
    - Wang Wenqing of Jiazi (甲子神王文卿)
    - Zhan Zijiang of Jiaxu (甲戌神展子江)
    - Hu Wenchang of Jiashen (甲申神扈文長)
    - Wei Yuqing of Jiawu (甲午神衛玉卿)
    - Meng Feiqing of Jiachen (甲辰神孟非卿)
    - Ming Wenzhang of Jiayin (甲寅神明文章)
- Li Jing, the Pagoda Bearing Heavenly King (托塔天王李靖), is a warrior deity carrying a miniature pagoda which can trap any spirit, deity or yaoguai. When Sun Wukong rebels against Heaven, Li Jing is ordered to lead a celestial army to attack the monkey at Mount Huaguo.
  - Jinzha (金吒) is Li Jing's eldest son.
  - Muzha (木吒) is Li Jing's second son and a disciple of Samantabhadra and Guanyin.
  - Nezha, the Third Lotus Prince (蓮花三太子哪吒), is Li Jing's third son and a warrior deity. He fights with Sun Wukong when the latter rebels against Heaven but loses to the monkey's trickery.
  - Juling Shen (巨靈神) leads the vanguard to attack Sun Wukong.
- Erlang Shen (二郎神) is a maternal nephew of the Jade Emperor and a warrior deity. Among all the warrior deities in the Taoist pantheon, he is the only one who manages to defeat and capture Sun Wukong when the latter rebels against Heaven.
  - The Howling Celestial Hound (哮天犬) and the Six Brothers of Mount Mei (梅山六兄弟) serve under Erlang Shen
- The Five Elders of the Five Positions (五位长老)
  - Guanyin of the South (南極觀音)
  - Chong'en Holy Emperor of the East (東方崇恩聖帝、十洲三島仙翁)
  - Baidi White Emperor of the West (西域白帝白帝)
  - Xuanling Doumu Yuanjun of the North (北方北極玄靈鬥姆元君)
  - Yellow Horn Immortal of the Central (中央黃極黃角大仙)
- The Lords of the Five Elements (五炁真君)
  - Wood Lord of the East (東方歲星木德真君)
  - Fire Lord of the South (南方熒惑火德真君)
  - Metal Lord of the West (西方太白金德真君), often referred to as Taibai Jinxing (太白金星; 'Great White Golden Star') in the novel, shows up occasionally to help the protagonists deal with yaoguai.
  - Water Lord of the North (北方辰星水德真君)
  - Earth Lord of the Central (中央鎮星土德真君)
- The Ten Yama Kings (十代冥王)
  - Qinguangwang (秦广王)
  - Chujiangwang (楚江王)
  - Songdiwang (宋帝王)
  - Wuguanwang (五官王)
  - Bianchengwang (卞城王)
  - Taishanwang (泰山王)
  - Pingdengwang (平等王)
  - Dushiwang (都市王)
  - Zhuanlunwang (转轮王)
- Weather deities:
  - The Duke of Thunder (雷公)
  - The Mother of Lightning (電母)
  - The Marquis of Wind (風伯)
  - The Master of Rain (雨師)
- Taiyi Leisheng Yinghua Tianzun (太乙雷聲應化天尊)
- Taiyi Jiuku Tianzun (太乙救苦天尊), better known as Taiyi Zhenren (太乙真人) in the novel, shows up to help the protagonists deal with the Grand Saint of Nine Spirits.
- Emperor Wenchang (文昌帝君)
- The Deity of the Moon (太陰星君), also known by her incarnation Chang'e (嫦娥)
- The Deity of the Sun (太陽星君)
- Marshals:
  - Marshal of the Heavenly Canopy (天蓬元帥)
  - Marshal of Heavenly Blessing (天佑元帥)
- Patrol deities:
  - The Day Patrol Deity (日遊神)
  - The Night Patrol Deity (夜遊神)
- Watcher deities:
  - Gao Ming, the Thousand Li Eye (千里眼高明)
  - Gao Jue, the Wind Following Ear (順風耳高覺)
- The Twelve Earthly Branches (十二元辰)
  - Zi (子)
  - Chou (丑)
  - Yin (寅)
  - Mao (卯)
  - Chen (辰)
  - Si (巳)
  - Wu (午)
  - Wei (未)
  - Shen (申)
  - You (酉)
  - Xu (戌)
  - Hai (亥)
- The 28 Mansions (二十八宿)
  - The Azure Dragon of the East (東方青龍)
    - The Wood Jiaolong of Horn (角木蛟)
    - The Golden Dragon of Neck (亢金龍)
    - The Earth Tanuki of Root (氐土貉)
    - The Sun Rabbit of Room (房日兔)
    - The Moon Fox of Heart (心月狐)
    - The Fire Tiger of Tail (尾火虎)
    - The Water Leopard of Winnowing Basket (箕水豹)
  - The Black Tortoise of the North (北方玄武)
    - The Wood Xiezhi of Dipper (斗木獬)
    - The Golden Ox of Ox (牛金牛)
    - The Earth Bat of Girl (女土蝠)
    - The Sun Rat of Emptiness (虛日鼠)
    - The Moon Swallow of Rooftop (危月燕)
    - The Fire Pig of Encampment (室火豬)
    - The Water Ya Yu (猰貐) of Wall (壁水貐)
  - The White Tiger of the West (西方白虎)
    - The Wood Wolf of Legs (奎木狼)
    - The Golden Dog of Bond (婁金狗)
    - The Earth Pheasant of Stomach (胃土雉)
    - The Sun Rooster of Hairy Head (昴日雞)
    - The Moon Bird of Net (畢月烏)
    - The Fire Monkey of Turtle Beak (觜火猴)
    - The Water Ape of Three Stars (參水猿)
  - The Vermilion Bird of the South (南方朱雀)
    - The Wood Bi An (狴犴) of Well (井木犴)
    - The Golden Sheep of Ghost (鬼金羊)
    - The Earth Water Deer of Willow (柳土獐)
    - The Sun Horse of Star (星日馬)
    - The Moon Deer of Extended Net (張月鹿)
    - The Fire Snake of Wings (翼火蛇)
    - The Water Earthworm of Chariot (軫水蚓)
- The Dragon Kings of the Four Seas (四海龍王)
  - Ao Guang, Dragon King of the East Sea (東海龍王敖廣)
  - Ao Qin, Dragon King of the South Sea (南海龍王敖欽)
  - Ao Shun, Dragon King of the North Sea (北海龍王敖順)
  - Ao Run, Dragon King of the West Sea (西海龍王敖閏)
- The Four Time Guardians (Chinese: 四值功曹)
  - Li Bing, Guardian of Years (值年神李丙)
  - Huang Chengyi, Guardian of Months (值月神黃承乙)
  - Zhou Deng, Guardian of Days (值日神周登)
  - Liu Hong, Guardian of Hours (值時神劉洪)
- The Five Gates (五方揭諦)
  - Golden Light Gate (金光揭諦)
  - Silver Headed Gate (銀頭揭諦)
  - Pāragate (波羅揭諦)
  - Pārasaṃgate (波羅僧揭諦)
  - Mahagate (摩訶揭諦)
- The Nine Stars (九曜星)
  - Gold Star (金星)
  - Wood Star (木星)
  - Water Star (水星)
  - Fire Star (火星)
  - Earth Star (土星)
  - Erode Star (蝕星)
  - Jidu Star (計都星)
  - Ziqi Star (紫炁星)
  - Yuebo Star (月孛星)
- The Seven Stars of the North Formation (北斗七星)
  - Greedy Wolf Star of Sunlight (陽明貪狼星君), based on the Dubhe.
  - Giant Gate Star of Dark Essence (陰精巨門星君), based on the Merak.
  - Lasting Prosperity Star of True Man (真人祿存星君), based on the Phecda.
  - Civil Star of Mystery and Darkness (玄冥文曲星君), based on the Megrez.
  - Danyuan Star of Honesty and Chasity (丹元廉貞星君), based on the Alioth.
  - Military Star of the North Pole (北極武曲星君), based on the Mizar.
  - Army Defeating Star of Heaven's Gate (天關破軍星君), based on the Alkaid.
- The Six Stars of the South Formation (南斗六星)
  - Star of Life (司命星君)
  - Star of Prosperity (司祿星君)
  - Star of Longevity (延壽星君)
  - Star of Benefit (益算星君)
  - Star of Adversity (度厄星君)
  - Star of Birth (上生星君)
- The Stars of Luck, Prosperity and Longevity (福祿壽三星)
  - Star of Luck (福星)
  - Star of Prosperity (祿星)
  - Star of Longevity (壽星)
- The Five Sacred Dragons (五大神龍)
  - Yellow Deity (黄帝)
  - Bluegreen Deity (蒼帝)
  - Black Deity (黑帝)
  - Red Deity (赤帝)
  - White Deity (白帝)
- The Devil King of Great Strength (大力鬼王)
- Wang Shan, the Keeper of Spirits (靈官王善)
- Lu Ban (魯班) is the deity of carpentry and building, and was the one who crafted Sha Wujing's weapon.
- The Four Heavenly Masters (四大天師)
  - Zhang Daoling (張道陵)
  - Xu Xun (許遜), also known as Xu Jingzhi (許敬之) or Xu Jingyang (許旌陽).
  - Qiu Hongji (邱弘濟)
  - Ge Hong (葛洪)
- The Barefoot Immortal (赤腳大仙)
- The City Gods (城隍)
- The Earth Gods (土地公)
- The Mountain Gods (山神)

== Historical figures ==
- Li Shimin, Emperor Taizong of Tang (唐太宗李世民)
- Wei Zheng (魏徵)
- Xu Maogong (徐懋功)
- Yuchi Gong (尉遲恭)
- Qin Qiong (秦瓊)
- Xiao Yu (蕭瑀)
- Fu Yi (傅奕)
- Yin Kaishan (殷開山)
- Yuan Tiangang (袁天罡)
- Li Chunfeng (李淳風)
- Li Yuan, Emperor Gaozu of Tang (唐高祖李淵)
- Li Jiancheng (李建成)
- Li Yuanji (李元吉)
- Xu Jingzong (許敬宗)
- Wang Gui (王珪)
- Xue Rengui (薛仁貴)
- Liu Hongji (劉弘基)
- Duan Zhixian (段志賢)
- Ma Sanbao (馬三寶)
- Cheng Yaojin (程咬金)
- Gao Shilian (高士廉)
- Zhang Gongjin (張公謹)
- Fang Xuanling (房玄齡)
- Du Ruhui (杜如晦)

== Antagonists ==
- The Demon King of Confusion (混世魔王) is a yaoguai who led his minions to seize control of the Water Curtain Cave (水簾洞) and drive away the primates shortly after Sun Wukong left to study under Master Bodhi. Many years later, Sun Wukong returns, defeats the yaoguai and takes back control of the cave.
- General Yin (寅將軍), Xiong Shanjun (熊山君), and Techushi (特處士) are three yaoguai whose true forms are a dark yellow tiger, a black bear, and a yellow buffalo respectively. They ambush Tang Sanzang and his two escorts at Double-Forked Ridge (雙叉嶺) and capture them. The escorts are killed and eaten by the yaoguai while Tang Sanzang is rescued by Taibai Jinxing.
- Elder Jinchi (金池長老) is the greedy abbot of the Guanyin Monastery (觀音禪院), who intends to kill Tang Sanzang and Sun Wukong to take Sanzang's cassock for himself, having been so impressed by it. He is also later revealed to be a long-time friend of the Black Wind Demon, who taught him magic that allowed him to achieve longevity, thus he has lived for 270 years.
  - Guangzhi (廣智) and Guangmou (廣謀) are Elder Jinchi's disciples. Guangmou is the one who gives Jinchi the idea to murder Tang Sanzang and steal his cassock.
- The Black Wind Demon (黑風怪) is a black bear yaoguai based in the Black Wind Cave (黑風洞) on Black Wind Mountain (黑風山). Appearing as a dark-complexioned man armed with a spear with a black tassel, he steals Tang Sanzang's cassock during the fire at a nearby monastery. The fire is set by the monastery's abbot, Elder Jinchi in an attempt to murder Tang Sanzang so that he can take the cassock for himself. Sun Wukong confronts the yaoguai later to retrieve his master's cassock, but the yaoguai manages to evade him every time. The yaoguai ultimately surrenders to Guanyin and serves as the mountain's guardian deity.
  - Baiyi Xiushi (白衣秀士; 'Scholar in a White Robe') and Lingxuzi (凌虛子), whose true forms are a white floral-patterned serpent and a grey wolf respectively, are the Black Wind Demon's yaoguai friends. They are both killed by Sun Wukong.
- The Yellow Wind Demon (黃風怪), is a yaoguai based in Yellow Wind Cave (黃風洞) at Yellow Wind Ridge (黃風嶺). After Tang Sanzang is captured by the yaoguai, Sun Wukong attempts to save his master but is held back by the yaoguai, who can blow great blasts of the "True Wind of Samadhi" (三昧真風; Sānmèi Zhēnfēng). Sun Wukong then seeks help from Lingji Bodhisattva, who subdues the yaoguai and reveals that the yaoguai is actually a yellow marten spirit from Vulture Peak.
  - The Tiger Vanguard (虎先鋒) is a minion of the Yellow Wind Demon who captures Tang Sanzang while Sun Wukong and Zhu Bajie are distracted. He is killed by Zhu Bajie.
- Immortal Zhenyuan (鎮元大仙), the patriarch of all earthbound immortals, is based in Wuzhuang Temple (五莊觀) on Longevity Mountain (萬壽山) in West Continent (西牛賀洲). In his temple, there is a special ginseng tree that produces only 30 fruits every 10,000 years. The fruit is shaped like an infant less than three days old; anyone who smells the fruit can extend their lifespan by 365 years, and anyone who consumes the fruit can live for another 48,000 years. Zhenyuan was away when the protagonists arrive at his temple on their journey. Earlier on, he had instructed his servants to serve two fruits to Tang Sanzang. When Tang Sanzang sees the fruit, he is disgusted by its appearance and refuses to eat it. The servants then secretly eat the fruits, but are seen by Zhu Bajie, who tells Sun Wukong about it. Sun Wukong then steals more fruits for himself and his juniors. When the servants realise some fruits are missing, they accuse Sun Wukong of theft and Sun Wukong destroys the tree in anger before escaping with his companions. When Zhenyuan returns to his temple, he turns furious after hearing about what happened and confronts the protagonists. The conflict is eventually resolved when Sun Wukong gets the Star of Longevity to restore the tree to life. Zhenyuan is so pleased that he becomes sworn brothers with Sun Wukong and treats all of them to a fruit feast before sending them off on their journey.
- The White Bone Demoness (白骨精), sometimes translated as Lady White Bone, is a shapeshifting skeleton yaoguai. She disguises herself as a young woman, pretending to offer poisoned fruits to Tang Sanzang. Sun Wukong sees through her ruse and apparently kills the young woman, but the yaoguai escapes and returns later in disguise as the young woman's mother. Sun Wukong sees through her disguise again and apparently kills the older woman. The yaoguai flees yet again and returns in disguise as a man claiming to be the older woman's husband and younger woman's father. Sun Wukong sees through the yaoguai's third disguise and finally destroys her. However, Tang Sanzang has been misled into believing that Sun Wukong has just murdered three innocent people, so he banishes Sun Wukong after the third time.
- The Yellow Robe Demon (黃袍怪) is a yaoguai based in Moon Waves Cave (波月洞) on Bowl Mountain (碗子山) in the Kingdom of Baoxiang (寶象國). When Tang Sanzang is captured by the yaoguai, Zhu Bajie and Sha Wujing attempt to save their master but are no match for the yaoguai, so Zhu Bajie reluctantly goes to bring back Sun Wukong, who was previously banished by their master for killing the White Bone Demoness. With the help of celestial forces, Sun Wukong uncovers the yaoguai's true identity: the Wood Wolf of Legs, one of the 28 Mansions. The Kuimulang had fallen in love with a Jade Maiden and wanted to elope with her, but they were caught and punished as romantic feelings were forbidden among celestials. After she is reincarnated as Baihuaxiu (百花羞), the third princess of the Kingdom of Baoxiang, the Kuimulang kidnaps her, marries her for 13 years and has two children with her. The Jade Emperor orders the remaining 27 Mansions to assist Sun Wukong in subduing their wayward fellow member and take him back to Heaven.
- The Golden Horned King (金角大王, Jīnjiǎo dàwáng) and Silver Horned King (銀角大王, Yínjiǎo dàwáng) are a pair of yaoguai brothers based in Lotus Cave (蓮花洞) on Flat Peak Mountain (平頂山). They use disguises to capture Tang Sanzang, and manage to pin down Sun Wukong under three mountains. With help from the local deities, Sun Wukong frees himself and uses trickery to save his master and rob the yaoguai of their five magic weapons, trapping them in their own magic gourd. Just then, Taishang Laojun appears and explains that the two yaoguai are actually his servants who had stolen their master's weapons and escaped to cause trouble. Then, he takes back his weapons and brings his servants back with him to Heaven.
  - The Dragon Suppressing Great Immortal (壓龍大仙), based in Dragon Suppressing Cave (壓龍洞), is a nine-tailed vixen. Taking the form of an elderly woman, she is actually the mother of the Golden and Silver Horned Kings. She is killed by Sun Wukong when her sons send their minions to fetch her to their mountain.
  - Hu'aqi (狐阿七), whose true form is a fox, is the nine-tailed vixen's brother. He is killed by Zhu Bajie.
- The Lion-Lynx Demon (獅猁怪) is a yaoguai who drowns the king of the Kingdom of Wuji (烏雞國) in a well, and impersonates the king for three years. After the ghost of the dead king appears to Tang Sanzang in a dream and begs him for help, Tang Sanzang sends his disciples to retrieve the king's body and use a Pill of Immortality to restore him to life. When they confront the yaoguai and expose him as an imposter, the yaoguai transforms into Tang Sanzang to confuse Sun Wukong. However, his cover is blown when he fails to recite the Ring-Tightening Mantra that gives Sun Wukong a headache. Just as Sun Wukong is about to destroy the yaoguai, Manjusri shows up and reveals that the yaoguai is actually the Azure Lion (青毛狮子) he rides on, and that he was acting on the Buddha's instruction to allow his steed to serve as an obstacle to the protagonists to test their resolve to complete their quest. Once he is done, Manjusri takes back the Azure Lion.
- Red Boy (紅孩兒), also known as Divine Infant Great King (圣婴大王), is a yaoguai who is Bull Demon King and Princess Iron Fan's son. A formidable opponent to Sun Wukong, he is capable of breathing samadhi fire, which drives back Sun Wukong. After Sun Wukong seeks help from Guanyin, Red Boy later finds Guanyin's lotus throne by chance and disrespectfully sits on it, but ends up being trapped and subdued. Red Boy eventually agrees to give up his evil ways and serve as an attendant to the bodhisattva.
- The Water Lizard Dragon (鼉龍), is a yaoguai armed with a Bamboo-Linked Bronze Club and based in Black River (黑水河) in Hengyang Valley (衡陽峪). He disguises himself as a boatman, pretends to ferry the protagonists across the river, and captures Tang Sanzang when they are unaware. Sun Wukong later learns that the yaoguai is actually the ninth son of the Dragon King of the Jing River, and had been placed there by Guanyin to serve as an obstacle to the protagonists. The Water Lizard Dragon is eventually subdued and taken away by his cousin, Crown Prince Mo'ang.
- The Immortal of Tiger Power (虎力大仙), Immortal of Elk Power (鹿力大仙), and Immortal of Antelope Power (羊力大仙) are three yaoguai who disguise themselves as magicians to deceive the ruler of the Kingdom of Chechi (車遲國) and become the king's advisers. As their names suggest, their true forms are a tiger, an elk, and an antelope respectively. Sun Wukong competes with them in a contest of magic powers and lures them into meeting their respective ends: Tiger is beheaded; Elk is disemboweled; Antelope is fried in boiling oil.
- The Great King of Numinous Power (靈感大王), armed with a bronze hammer, is a yaoguai based in Heaven-Reaching River (通天河). He terrorises the people living near the river and demands that they sacrifice a boy and a girl to him every year, or else he will cause flooding. After Sun Wukong defeats him, he retreats to his underwater lair. Later, Sun Wukong learns from Guanyin that the yaoguai is actually a goldfish from a lotus pond at Mount Putuo who had obtained his powers after listening to the bodhisattva recite Buddhist scriptures every day. Guanyin uses a fish basket to trap the goldfish and take him back to the pond.
- The Great White Turtle (大白龜) is a giant turtle based in Heaven-Reaching River (通天河) who was forced out of his underwater residence by the Great King of Numinous Power. After the yaoguai was subdued and taken away, the turtle feels so grateful to the protagonists that he ferries them across the river on his back. Before continuing on his journey, Tang Sanzang promises to help the turtle ask the Buddha when the turtle will be able to assume human form. However, Tang Sanzang forgets his promise when he and his disciples reach their final destination at Vulture Peak and meet the Buddha. On their way back to Chang'an, the protagonists are abruptly dropped off at Heaven-Reaching River, where they meet the turtle again. While ferrying them across the river on his back again, the turtle asks Tang Sanzang about his promise, and Tang Sanzang apologises for forgetting. The unhappy turtle throws them off his back into the water, forcing them to swim across the river. This incident fulfils the last of the 81 tribulations that Tang Sanzang is destined to face on his journey to obtain the scriptures.
- The Single Horned Rhinoceros King (獨角兕大王), armed with a bronze spear, is a yaoguai based in Golden Pouch Cave (金兜洞) on Golden Pouch Mountain (金兜山) who captures Tang Sanzang, Zhu Bajie and Sha Wujing. While fighting the yaoguai, Sun Wukong loses his Ruyi Jingu Bang after the yaoguai uses a giant magic ring to suck it away from him. Sun Wukong then seeks help from various celestial forces, including Li Jing, Nezha, the fire deities, and the Eighteen Arhats, but all of them also lose their weapons. The yaoguai is eventually revealed to be Taishang Laojun's steed, the Azure Bull, who had stolen his master's magic ring and used it to cause trouble. Taishang Laojun shows up to subdue the Azure Bull and take back his magic ring.
- The Ruler of Women's Country (女兒國國王) is the ruler of a country in Western Xiliang with an all-female population — reminiscent of Amazons. When the protagonists arrive in her country, she falls in love with Tang Sanzang and wants to marry him. On Sun Wukong's suggestion, Tang Sanzang pretends to marry the ruler and lies that his three disciples will go to fetch the scriptures in his place. Just as the protagonists are about to leave the country and continue on their quest, the Scorpion Demoness shows up and captures Tang Sanzang.
- Immortal Ruyi (如意真仙) is a yaoguai who is Bull Demon King's brother. He is based in Immortal Gathering Temple (聚仙庵) on Mount Jieyang (解陽山) in Women's Country. While they are in Women's Country, Tang Sanzang and Zhu Bajie unsuspectingly drink from the Spring of Pregnancy and become pregnant. The only cure is to drink from the Spring of Abortion, which is under Ruyi's control. When the women in Women's Country want to drink from the spring, they need to present gifts to Ruyi first. Ruyi holds a grudge against Sun Wukong because of the fate of his nephew, Red Boy, and he behaves in a hostile manner when Sun Wukong comes to seek water from the spring. Ruyi is eventually outwitted and defeated by Sun Wukong.
- The Scorpion Demoness (蠍子精), whose true form is a pipa-sized giant scorpion, is a yaoguai based in Pipa Cave (琵琶洞) on Venom Mountain (毒敵山). Shortly after leaving Women's Country, Tang Sanzang is abducted by the yaoguai and taken to her lair, where she tries to seduce him to marry her. Sun Wukong and Zhu Bajie fight the yaoguai to save their master but are held back by her venomous sting. Eventually, they seek help from the Sun Rooster of Hairy Head, one of the 28 Mansions, who transforms into a giant rooster and kills the scorpion.
- The Six-Eared Macaque (六耳獼猴) is a spiritual primate on par with Sun Wukong in terms of their powers and abilities. Hoping to prove that he is better than Sun Wukong, the Macaque first appears in Western Liang in disguise as Sun Wukong, knocks Tang Sanzang unconscious, and steals the baggage and paperwork. Later, when he fights with Sun Wukong, neither of them is able to overcome his opponent. No one is able to identify who the real Sun Wukong is until they show up before the Buddha, who tells them about the spiritual primates. The Macaque attempts to flee when he realises his identity is revealed, but the Buddha traps him under a giant alms bowl, and he is then killed by Sun Wukong.
- The Bull Demon King (牛魔王), whose true form is a giant white bull, is a yaoguai based in Sky-Scraping Cave (摩雲洞) on Thunder-Accumulating Mountain (積雷山). Early in the novel, he becomes sworn brothers with Sun Wukong and five other yaoguai and is ranked the most senior of the seven. Later on, when the protagonists arrive at the Flaming Mountains on their journey, they get into conflict with Bull Demon King and Princess Iron Fan, especially since Sun Wukong had caused the downfall of their son, Red Boy. Bull Demon King is ultimately subdued by celestial forces and taken to Heaven for the Jade Emperor to decide his fate.
  - The Water Repelling Golden Crystal Beast (避水金晶獸) is Bull Demon King's steed.
  - The Jade-Faced Princess (玉面公主), whose true form is a vixen, is Bull Demon King's concubine. She is killed by Zhu Bajie.
- Princess Iron Fan (鐵扇公主) is a rakshasa who is Bull Demon King's estranged wife and Red Boy's mother. Her secret weapon is a banana leaf fan, which can create strong winds. When Sun Wukong tries to borrow her fan to put out the fires at the Flaming Mountains, she is extremely hostile towards him because of his role in her son's downfall. Sun Wukong then uses trickery to steal the fan from her.
- The Wansheng Dragon King (萬聖龍王) is a yaoguai based in Emerald Waves Lake (碧波潭) at Rocky Mountain (亂石山) in the Kingdom of Jisai (祭賽國). He plots with his son-in-law, the Nine-Headed Beast, to steal a śarīra from the pagoda in Golden Ray Monastery (金光寺) and release a rain of blood in the kingdom. Without the śarīra, the pagoda loses its magical glow. The king blames the calamity on the monks, accusing them of stealing the śarīra and persecuting them. When Sun Wukong and his companions arrive in Jisai, they uncover the truth and confront and kill the dragon king and his family. The lost śarīra is found and returned to the pagoda.
  - The Wansheng Princess (萬聖公主) is Wansheng Dragon King's daughter and the Nine-Headed Beast's wife who had stolen the Nine Leaves Lingzhi Herb from the Queen Mother of the West. She is slain by Zhu Bajie.
  - The Nine-Headed Beast (九頭蟲), also known as the Nine-Headed Prince Consort (九頭駙馬), is Wansheng Dragon King's son-in-law who is armed with a monk's spade. He collaborates with his father-in-law to steal the śarīra from the pagoda. Sun Wukong enlists the help of celestial forces to deal with the demons. The Nine-Headed Beast has one of his heads bitten off by Erlang Shen's hound but manages to escape.
  - Benbo'erba (奔波兒灞) and Babo'erben (灞波兒奔) are two minions of the Nine-Headed Beast whose respective forms are a sheatfish and a blackfish. Sun Wukong encounters them at the pagoda and captures and interrogates them, finding out the truth behind the theft of the śarīra.
- A group of tree yaoguai are based in Wood Immortal Temple (木仙庵) at Bramble Ridge (荊棘嶺). The four most senior are Jinjie Shiba Gong (勁節十八公), Guzhi Gong (孤直公), Lingkongzi (凌空子) and Fuyun Sou (拂雲叟), who appear in human form as four old men. Their true forms are a pine tree, a cedar tree, a juniper tree, and a bamboo tree respectively. Tang Sanzang encounters them in the temple and discusses poetry with them. Other yaoguai include the Naked Demon (赤身鬼) and the Apricot Immortal (杏仙), whose true forms are a maple tree and an apricot tree respectively, while their servants are flowers. Sun Wukong sees through their disguise and tells Zhu Bajie when the latter asks him if he detects any yaoguai in the vicinity. Zhu Bajie then destroys all the yaoguai on his own initiative. Tang Sanzang reprimands Zhu Bajie for killing the yaoguai because they never harmed him, but Sun Wukong explains that it is better to destroy them in case they turn evil in the future.
- The Yellow Brows Great King (黃眉大王) is a yaoguai who creates a replica of the Leiyin Temple at Vulture Peak and impersonates the Buddha while his followers disguise themselves as the Buddha's followers. Tang Sanzang, Zhu Bajie and Sha Wujing fall for the ruse, mistakenly believing that they have reached Leiyin Temple, and end up being captured by the yaoguai. Sun Wukong, unable to overcome the yaoguai, seeks help from various celestial forces but they all get trapped by the yaoguai in a magic sack. Just then, Maitreya shows up and reveals that the yaoguai is actually his attendant who had escaped to cause trouble. At Maitreya's suggestion, Sun Wukong transforms into a watermelon, allowing the unsuspecting yaoguai to eat him and enter his stomach. Sun Wukong causes great agony to the yaoguai in his stomach, forcing him to surrender and return to Maitreya.
- The Python Demon (蟒蛇精) is a yaoguai based in Tuoluo Manor (駝羅庄) on Qijue Mountain (七絕山). Armed with a pair of spears, which are actually the tips of his forked tongue, his true form is a giant python with red scales and glowing eyes. He has eaten many people and animals living in the surroundings. He is killed when Sun Wukong enters his body in disguise as a fly and breaks out of his stomach.
- Sai Tai Sui (賽太歲; 'Equivalent to Tai Sui') is a yaoguai based on Qilin Mountain (麒麟山) in the Kingdom of Zhuzi (朱紫國). Armed with a broad axe, he also has a set of Purple-Gold Bells, which can conjure fire, smoke and dust storms. He kidnaps one of the king's concubines and tries to force her to marry him. Unknown to him, the Immortal Ziyang (紫陽真人) has secretly cast a protective charm on the lady such that anyone who touches her will feel like being pricked by thorns. Sun Wukong uses tricks to steal the bells from Sai Tai Sui and then uses them against the yaoguai. Eventually, the yaoguai is revealed to be the Golden-Haired Hou (金毛犼), a large canine beast which Guanyin rides on. The bodhisattva shows up to subdue the Hou and take him back.

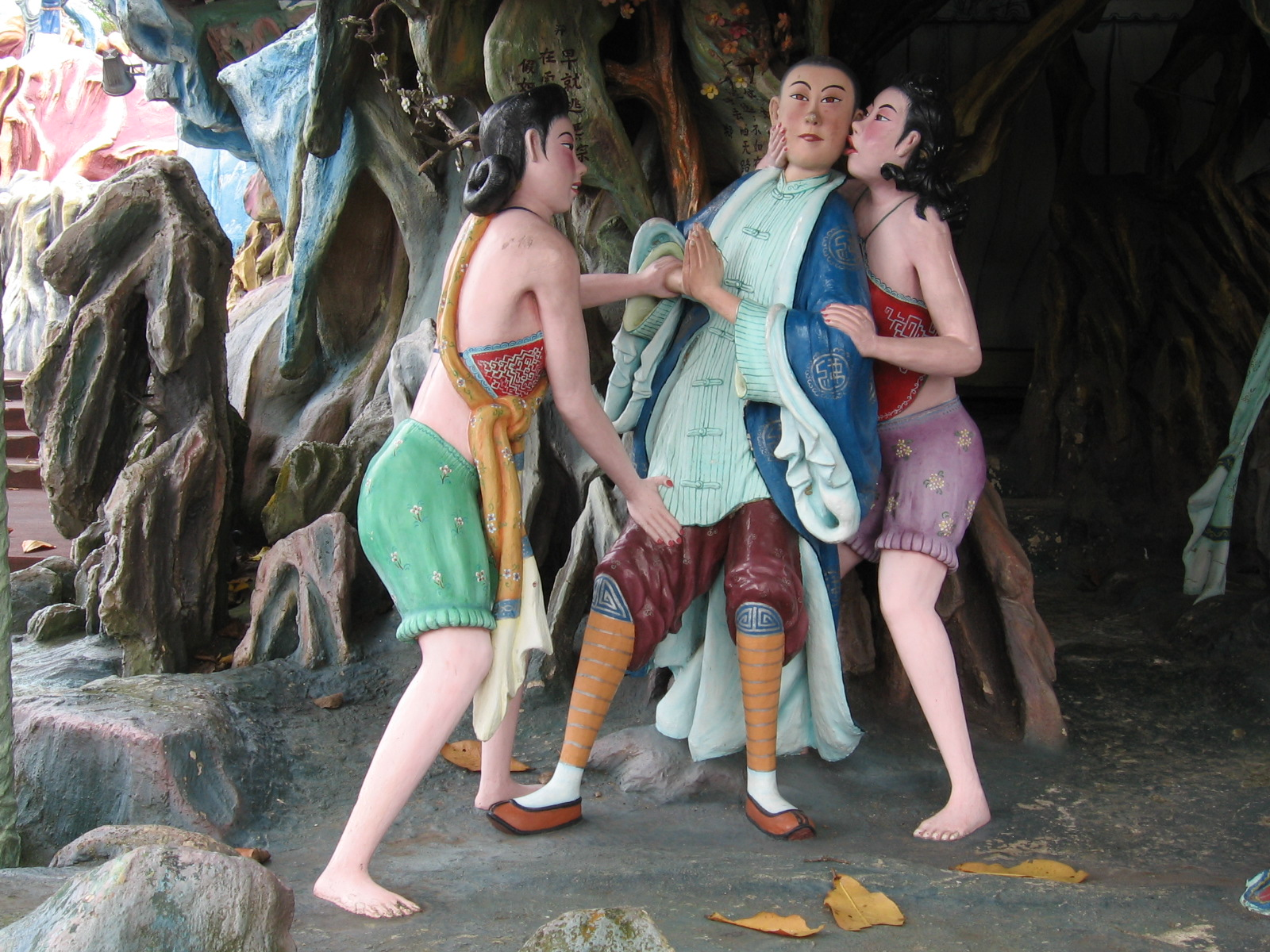
Diorama at Haw Par Villa, Singapore, depicting two of the Spider Demonesses trying to seduce Tang Sanzang.

- The Spider Demonesses (蜘蛛精) are seven spider yaoguai sisters based in Silk Cave (盤絲洞) at Silk Ridge (盤絲嶺). Tang Sanzang stumbles upon their thatched hut while begging for alms and tries to leave after suspecting that they are yaoguai. However, it is too late as the yaoguai emit spider silk from their navels and spin a web to trap Tang Sanzang. They are defeated by Sun Wukong later and have no choice but to release Tang Sanzang. They are ultimately killed by Sun Wukong.
- The Hundred-Eyed Demon Lord (百眼魔君), also known as the Multiple-Eyed Creature (多目怪), is a giant centipede yaoguai based in Yellow Flower Temple (黃花觀) who has a thousand eyes radiating brilliant golden light to confuse enemies and victims. He is a friend of the seven spider sisters, who approach him for help in taking revenge after Sun Wukong defeats them. When the protagonists stop at his temple for a break, he pretends to offer them drinks, which have been poisoned. After Sun Wukong sees through his ruse, he holds Tang Sanzang hostage while Sun Wukong then captures the seven spiders. When he refuses to exchange Tang Sanzang for the spiders, Sun Wukong kills the spiders in anger. The centipede is eventually subdued by Pilanpo Bodhisattva and sent to guard the Thousand Flowers Cave (千花洞) at Purple Clouds Mountain (紫雲山).
- The three yaoguai based in Lion Camel Cave (獅駝洞) at Lion Camel Ridge (獅駝嶺):
  - The Azure Lion (青毛獅子) is armed with a bronze sword and capable of transforming himself into several times bigger or smaller than his usual size. While he is fighting Sun Wukong, he swallows the latter, who causes him great pain inside his stomach. The Lion then pretends to agree to open his mouth to let Sun Wukong out, while secretly planning to bite him to death when he comes out. Having seen through the Lion's ruse, Sun Wukong sticks out his Ruyi Jingu Bang instead and the Lion breaks his teeth after biting on the staff. Sun Wukong then ties a long rope around the yaoguai's heart and plays with it before leaving his stomach. The bodhisattva Manjusri shows up again and reveals that the yaoguai is actually the Azure Lion he rides on, and he helps the protagonist subdue the Lion and takes it back.
  - The Golden Winged Great Peng (金翅大鵬雕), armed with a ji and capable of flying over great distances, possesses a magic flask which can trap victims and reduce them to a bloody pulp. He uses the flask to trap Sun Wukong but the latter breaks out and renders the flask useless since its contents have been spilled in the process. The Peng is later revealed to be the brother of the peacock Mahamayuri, the Buddha's godmother. The Buddha shows up to subdue the yaoguai and takes him back to Vulture Peak.
  - The Yellow Toothed Elephant (黃牙老象), armed with a long spear, appears as a gigantic humanoid with an elephant's head and a long nose capable of trapping and crushing victims. While he is fighting with Zhu Bajie, he uses his nose to wrap around the latter and capture him. The Elephant is eventually revealed to be the Six-tusked White Elephant that the bodhisattva Samantabhadra rides on. Samantabhadra shows up to subdue the Elephant and takes him back.
- The White Deer Spirit (白鹿精) and his adoptive daughter, the White-Faced Vixen Spirit (白面狐狸精), are a white deer and a vixen respectively. Disguising himself as a middle-aged man, the Deer transforms the Vixen into a beautiful young maiden and gets the ruler of the Kingdom of Biqiu (比丘國) to marry her while he becomes the king's father-in-law. Under the two yaoguai's influence, the king's health gradually deteriorates, so the Deer lies that he needs the hearts of 1,111 children to make a cure. The king then gives an order to capture 1,111 children and imprison them in cages, preparing to have them killed and their hearts harvested. When the protagonists show up in Biqiu, the Deer lies to the king that Tang Sanzang's heart is the best cure. Sun Wukong saves the children, stops the two yaoguai, and exposes their true forms. The Vixen is killed by Zhu Bajie, while the Deer, which turns out to be the White Deer that the Old Man of the South Pole rides on, is taken back by its master.
- Lady Earth Flow (地涌夫人) is a yaoguai who is actually a Golden-Nosed Albino Rat Spirit (金鼻白毛老鼠精) who obtained her powers after practising Taoist arts for 300 years and secretly consuming sacred candles at Vulture Peak. After she was captured by Li Jing and Nezha, she was supposed to be executed but the Buddha told them to spare her life. She was so grateful that she acknowledged Li Jing as her godfather and Nezha as her godbrother. Later, she moved to the Bottomless Pit (無底洞) at Flaming Air Mountain (焰空山) and armed herself with a pair of swords. When the protagonists pass by Black Pines Forest (黑松林), she disguises herself as a damsel in distress to attract Tang Sanzang's attention. Tang Sanzang takes pity on her and lets her accompany them to a nearby temple, but Sun Wukong sees through her guise. She eats six monks in the temple and captures Tang Sanzang when Sun Wukong and the others are distracted. Sun Wukong finds out her true identity later and brings Li Jing and Nezha to subdue her and take her back.
- The King of the Southern Hill (南山大王) is a yaoguai based in Linked Cave (連環洞) on Bent Peak (折岳) at Hidden Misty Mountain (隱霧山). Armed with an iron pestle, he is capable of creating windstorms and mist. When he learns that the protagonists are approaching the mountain, he comes up with a plan to separately lure Sun Wukong, Zhu Bajie and Sha Wujing away from Tang Sanzang and capture their master. Sun Wukong infiltrates his lair later and casts a sleeping spell on the yaoguai and his minions and saves Tang Sanzang. The yaoguai is slain by Zhu Bajie just as he awakes, and his true form is revealed to be a leopard with mugwort-shaped patterns on its body, possibly a snow leopard.
- The Ruler of the Kingdom of Miefa (滅法國國王; "Miefa" literally means "destroy dharma") hates Buddhists and once made an oath to slaughter 10,000 monks. He has already killed 9,996 monks when the protagonists arrive in his kingdom. To evade trouble, the protagonists disguise themselves as horse traders and hide in a big cupboard in an inn. That night, the cupboard is stolen by thieves but recovered by the authorities and brought to the palace. Sun Wukong cast sleeping spells on everyone in the palace and shaved their heads. The next morning, when the king wakes up, he is shocked to see that he, his family members, and his subjects are all bald just like monks. He realises that he has done wrong in persecuting Buddhists so he repents and renames his domain "Kingdom of Qinfa" (欽法國; "Qinfa" literally means "respect for dharma").
- The Tawny Lion Demon (黃獅精), armed with a giant spade, is a lion yaoguai based in Tiger's Jaw Cave (虎口洞) at Leopard's Head Mountain (豹頭山) in the Kingdom of Yuhua, and a god-grandson of the Nine-Headed Lion. When he learns that the protagonists are approaching the mountain, he steals their weapons out of greed. They attack his cave to take back their weapons and end up killing him and his minions. His death leads to the conflict between the protagonist and the Nine-Headed Lion.
- The Grand Saint of Nine Spirits (九靈元聖) is a lion yaoguai revered as the grand spiritual ancestor by a clan of lion yaoguai at Jiuqu Panhuan Cave (九曲盤桓洞) at Bamboo Links Mountain (竹節山) near the Kingdom of Yuhua (玉華國). When he learns that his god-grandson, the Tawny Lion Demon, has been killed by Sun Wukong, he seeks vengeance and captures Tang Sanzang, Zhu Bajie, Sha Wujing and the royal family of Yuhua and has all of them whipped. Eventually, Sun Wukong uncovers the yaoguai's true identity: the Nine-Headed Lion (九頭獅) that the immortal Taiyi Zhenren rides on. He seeks help from Taiyi Zhenren, who shows up to subdue the Lion and take him back to Heaven.
  - Roushi (猱獅), Xueshi (雪獅), Suanni (狻猊), Baize (白澤), Fuli (伏狸) and Boxiang (摶象) are six lion yaoguai who used to inhabit the Jiuqu Panhuan Cave before the arrival of the Nine-Headed Lion, whom they honour as their grand spiritual ancestor. They are captured by Sun Wukong and his companions and executed.
- The King of Cold Protection (辟寒大王), King of Heat Protection (辟暑大王) and King of Dust Protection (辟塵大王) are three rhinoceros yaoguai based in Xuanying Cave (玄英洞) on Azure Dragon Mountain (青龍山) in Jinping Prefecture (金平府). Armed with a battleaxe, a broadsword, and a rattan staff respectively, they disguise themselves as buddhas and steal aromatic oil from lamps on a bridge, tricking worshippers into believing that the "buddhas" have accepted the oil offered to them. When Tang Sanzang goes to pay respect to the "buddhas", the yaoguai capture him and flee. Sun Wukong and his companions try to save their master but are outnumbered by the yaoguai and their minions, so they seek help from celestial forces. The yaoguai are eventually defeated and killed by the combined efforts of Sun Wukong, his companions, four of the 28 Mansions, and marine forces led by Crown Prince Mo'ang.

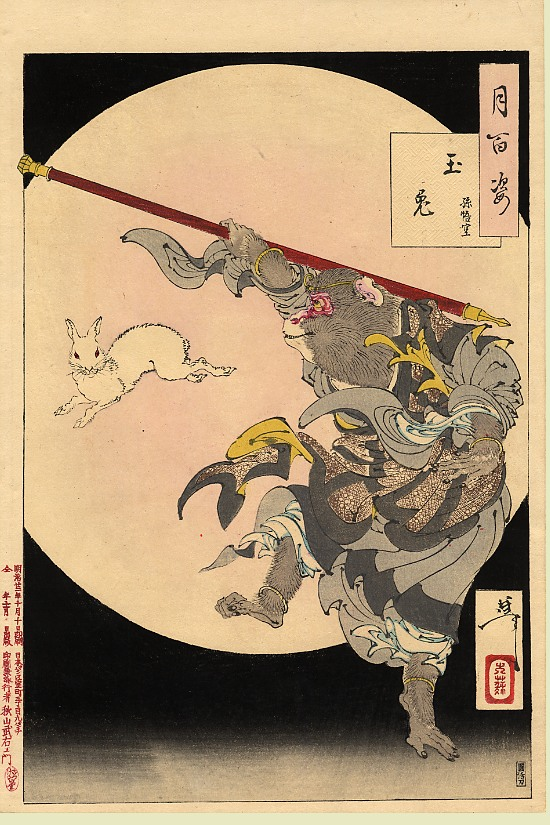
Sun Wukong and the Moon Rabbit, depicted in Yoshitoshi's One Hundred Aspects of the Moon, 1889.

- The Jade Rabbit Spirit (玉兔精) is actually the moon rabbit which pounds a mortar and pestle in Guanghan Palace (廣寒宮) on the Moon. She holds a grudge against the fairy Su'e (素娥), who had hit her before. After Su'e is reincarnated as a princess of Tianzhu, the rabbit escapes from the Moon to take her revenge and lives on Maoying Mountain (毛穎山). Armed with a short staff transformed from her pestle, she kidnaps the princess and impersonates her. When Tang Sanzang passes by Tianzhu on his journey, she wants to marry him so that she can absorb his yang essence and increase her powers. Sun Wukong sees through her disguise and fights with her. Just as Sun Wukong is about to defeat the rabbit, the Moon Deity show up and stop him and takes the rabbit back to the Moon.

== Others ==
- Puti Zushi (菩提祖師), based on Subhūti, is the one who named Sun Wukong and taught him the various magic powers. Before Sun Wukong leaves after completing his training, Master Bodhi forbids him from ever revealing the identity of his master.
- The Golden-Crested Great Immortal (金顶大仙), who resides in the Jade Truth Temple and gatekeeper at the foot of the Buddhist holy land.
- The Seven Sages (Chinese: 七聖) are a fraternity of demon kings who become sworn brothers with Sun Wukong early in the novel. They are Bull Demon King (牛魔王), Jiao Demon King (蛟魔王), Peng Demon King (鵬魔王), Lion Camel King (獅駝王), Macaque King (獼猴王), and Long-Tailed Marmoset King (禺狨王).
- Liu Boqin (劉伯欽) is a hunter who protects Tang Sanzang from wild beasts and provides him with food and shelter. He introduces the latter to Sun Wukong, who was trapped under a mountain by the Buddha.
- Gao Cuilan (高翠蘭) is a woman forced by Zhu Bajie to be his wife.
- Squire Gao (高員外) is Gao Cuilan's father.
- The Dragon King of Jing River (涇河龍王) is the ruler of the Jing River and a relative of the Dragon Kings of the Four Seas. He makes a bet with Yuan Shoucheng, who claims he can predict the weather. Upon learning that the prediction matches what the Jade Emperor has decreed for the next day's weather, the Dragon King changes the timing and amount of rainfall in order to win the bet. However, in doing so, he has broken celestial rules so the Jade Emperor orders his execution, which was carried out by Wei Zheng. The Dragon King has nine sons:
  - Little Yellow Dragon (小黃龍), who oversees the Huai River
  - Little Black Dragon (小驪龍), who oversees the Ji River
  - Green-Backed Dragon (青背龍), who oversees the Yangtze
  - Red-Bearded Dragon (赤髯龍), who oversees the Yellow River
  - Fortunate Old Dragon (福老龍), who serves as a bell keeper for the Buddha
  - Civil Longevity Dragon (文壽龍), who guards the ridge at the celestial palace
  - Fervent Loyalty Dragon (精忠龍), who guards the Sky-supporting Huabiao at the celestial palace
  - Divine Dragon (神龍), who stays at Taiyue Mountain with his uncle, the Dragon King of the East Sea
  - Water Lizard Dragon (鼉龍)
- Crown Prince Mo'ang (摩昂太子), the eldest son of the Dragon King of the West Sea.
- Wu Gang (吳剛) is the one responsible with chopping down a self healing osmanthus on the moon, a branch from the tree is stated to have been crafted into Sha Wujing's weapon.
