= Journey to the West (2011 TV series) =

Chinese fantasy television series

- Promotional art

Chinese name
- Traditional Chinese: 西遊記
- Simplified Chinese: 西游记
Transcriptions
Standard Mandarin
- Hanyu Pinyin: Xī Yóu Jì
- Genre: Chinese mythology, shenmo, fantasy, adventure
- Based on: Journey to the West by Wu Cheng'en
- Screenplay by: Gao Dayong; Liu Yi; Lang Xuefeng; Huang Yonghui; Kang Feng; Zhang Hua
- Directed by: Zhang Jianya
- Presented by: Ma Zhongjun
- Starring: Wu Yue; Nie Yuan; Zang Jinsheng; Elvis Tsui
- Theme music composer: Xu Jingqing
- Opening theme: Xin Jing (心经) performed by Yang Xiaolin
- Ending theme: Ganwen Lu Zai Hefang (敢问路在何方) performed by Dao Lang
- Composer: Chen Tong
- Country of origin: China
- Original language: Mandarin
- No. of episodes: 66

Production
- Producer: Zhang Jizhong
- Production location: China
- Cinematography: Yang Tao; Jiang Youxing; Guan Jianxiong; Mou Jianhui; Luo Yongyuan; Hao Dajun
- Editors: Zhang Jin; Zhang Yubao
- Camera setup: Multi-camera
- Running time: 45 minutes per episode
- Production companies: Ciwen Film & TV Production Co. Ltd.

Original release
- Network: TVS
- Release: 28 July 2011

Journey to the West is a Chinese television series adapted from the 16th-century novel of the same title. Production for the 66 episodes long series started on 12 September 2009, and it was first broadcast in mainland China on 28 July 2011 on TVS. The series was produced by Zhang Jizhong and was released a year later than another television series of the same title (broadcast on Zhejiang Satellite TV), but with a different cast and crew.

== Cast ==
=== Main cast ===
- Wu Yue as Sun Wukong
- Nie Yuan as Tang Sanzang
- Zang Jinsheng as Zhu Bajie/Marshal Tianpeng
- Elvis Tsui as Sha Wujing/Curtain-Lifting General
- Qian Yongchen as White Dragon Horse

=== Other cast ===
Note: Some cast members played multiple roles.

- Ma Jingwu as Subhuti
- Zhang Jizhong as Taishang Laojun
- Wei Zi as Jade Emperor
- Wang Huichun as Buddha
- Liu Tao as Guanyin (holding a willow branch)
- Liang Li as Guanyin (holding a fish basket)
- Stephanie Hsiao as Thousand Armed Guanyin
- Sattawat Sethakorn as Avalokiteśvara (Guanyin's male form)
- Yang Xiaolin as Guanyin's female form
- Tong Chun-chung as Emperor Taizong of Tang
- Feng Shaofeng as Erlang Shen
- He Zhuoyan as Golden Nosed Albino Rat Spirit
- Chen Zhihui as Bull Demon King
- Hu Ke as Princess Iron Fan
- Yan Danchen as Baihuaxiu
- You Yong as King of Baoxiang
- Shu Chang as Ruler of Women's Kingdom
- He Jiayi as Royal Advisor of Women's Kingdom
- Ady An as White Bone Demon
- Zhang Meng as Lady of Wansheng Palace
- Jessey Meng as Black Spider Demon
- Ma Li as Queen Mother of the West
- Yang Niansheng as Wei Zheng / Taibai Jinxing
- Zhao Yi as Li Jing
- Yang Guang as Chang'e
- Ma Ruihao, Ma Ruihan as Nezha
- Zhao Lixin as Immortal Zhenyuan
- Lu Xiaotian as Qingfeng
- Liu Zenghui as Mingyue
- Su Gang, Zhu Pengcheng, Li Zhonghua as Fu Lu Shou
- Hong Zilin as Mao Nü
- Miao Ya Ning as Red Boy
- Qin Ziyue as Jade Faced Vixen
- Cheng Haofeng as Yellow Robe Demon
- Wu Wenjun as Yellow Robe Demon's son
- Sun Yufan as Yellow Robe Demon's daughter
- Zhao Wenqi as Scorpion Demon
- Zhang Hengping as Evil priest, Guzhi Gong, Dragon King of the South Sea, Interconnected-Arm Gibbon
- Hu'erxide as Queen of Wuji
- Zhang Chunzhong as Abbot of Baolin Monastery, Yellow Wind Demon
- Hou Yueqiu as Immortal of Antelope Power
- Li Tai as Nine Headed Bug
- Su An as Almond Immortal
- Li Qiang as Naked Demon
- Zhao Qiang as King of the Southern Hill, Fire Tiger of Tail, Gao Cai, Meticulous Devil
- Xi Xianfeng as King of Heat Protection
- Pan Yanfei as Blue Spider Demon
- Huang Yiwen as Purple Spider Demon
- Lin Ketong as Yellow Spider Demon
- Wang Yirong as Orange Spider Demon
- Zhang Lisha as Red Spider Demon
- Chen Jinjin as Blue Dress Fairy
- Liu Jing as Purple Dress Fairy
- Wang Xinzi as Queen of Biqiu (White Faced Vixen)
- Gu Xuan as Fake Princess of India (Jade Rabbit)
- Jing Gangshan as Manjusri
- Ma Lun as Barefoot Immortal
- Li Yuan as Virūḍhaka, Golden Dragon of Neck
- Sheng Yang as Dhṛtarāṣṭra
- Fu Yunzhao as Vaiśravaṇa
- Jia Zongchao as Virūpākṣa
- Shi Lei as Golden Furnace Boy
- Sun Xinyu as Silver Furnace Boy
- Ma Zijun as Reverend Wuchao, Wansheng Dragon King
- Wang Jianguo as Dragon King of the East Sea, Sai Tai Sui, old monk
- Zhou Xiaobin as Dragon King of the West Sea, Hundred-Eyed Demon Lord (Centipede Demon)
- Jia Shitou as Grand Saint of Nine Spirits (Nine Headed Lion), Juling Shen
- Li Dan as Duke of Thunder
- Zhang Chunyan as Mother of Lightning
- Wang Lele as Granny of Wind
- Yuan Li as Cloud Pushing Boy
- Mu Jianrong as Wood Dragon of Horn
- Lian Yuxuan as Fire Tiger of Tail
- Su Mao as Lingji Bodhisattva
- Xiaomao as King of Spiritual Touch
- Qi Daji as Spotted Fish
- Pengcuo Zhaxi as Abbot of Zhenhai Monastery
- Wu Wenyu as Boy from Biqiu
- Chen Shaping as Squire Gao, Mountain Deity
- Mo Xiaofeng as Gao Cuilan
- Yin Pingzhi, Zhang Xueying, Wu Yajing as Gao family maids
- Ma Yuxi as Tang imperial consort
- Li Shuang, Zhang Shen as Earth Deities
- Qu Dalei as one of the Six Saints of Mount Mei
- Liu Bing as Witty Bug
- Gao Zhao as White Guard of Impermanence
- Hu Shaolong as Black Guard of Impermanence
- Bian Qiuwei, Han Biao, Song Lifeng, Zhu Qingmin as strongmen in Peach Garden
- Yu Zhenhuan as Red Bottomed Horse Monkey
- Chen Manzi as Water Star
- Zhao Guixiang as Zhang Daoling
- Bai Hailong as Wood Star
- Ji Xiaolong as Gentleman of Mist
- Wang Xiaoming as Hui'an
- Song Songlin as Samantabhadra
- Xu Hongzhou as Ksitigarbha
- Gao Yuanfeng as Ananda
- Wang Ruihong as Lishan Laomu
- Huang Xingbei as Six-Eared Macaque
- Bahatiya'er Aizezi as King of Jisai
- Zhou Gang as Maitreya
- Alipu Aitanmu as King of Zhuzi
- Liu Zhengliang as Immortal Ziyang
- Wu Yanshu as Pilanpo Bodhisattva
- Shi Hengliang as Sun Rooster of Hairy Head
- Yibulayimu Paha'erding as King of Biqiu
- Shadike Shata'er as Royal father-in-law of Biqiu (White Deer Spirit)
- Yasheng Maimaiti as King of Miefa
- Gulibaha'er Abudureheman as Queen of Miefa
- Ayiguzhali Abuduwayiti as Royal consort of Miefa
- Gulijiamali Maimaitiniyazi as Widow Zhao
- Nijiati Niyazi as King of India
- Reyihanguli Keranmu as Queen of India
- Kalibinu'er Keyimu as Princess of India

== Music ==
The lyrics of the opening theme song, performed by Yang Xiaolin, are taken from the mantra of the Buddhist scripture Heart Sutra. The ending theme song, sung by Dao Lang, is a remixed version of the 1986 television series Journey to the West's theme song, which was originally performed by Jiang Dawei.

== See also ==
- Journey to the West (2010 TV series)
- List of media adaptations of Journey to the West
