= Journey to the West (2010 TV series) =

Chinese fantasy television series

- Promotional poster

Chinese name
- Traditional Chinese: 西遊記
- Simplified Chinese: 西游记
Transcriptions
Standard Mandarin
- Hanyu Pinyin: Xī Yóu Jì
- Genre: Chinese mythology, shenmo, fantasy, adventure
- Based on: Journey to the West by Wu Cheng'en
- Screenplay by: Zhang Pingxi
- Directed by: Cheng Lidong
- Presented by: Cheng Lidong
- Starring: Fei Zhenxiang; Victor Chen; Xie Ning; Mou Fengbin
- Opening theme: Ta Ge Xi Xing (踏歌西行) performed by Tengger
- Ending theme: 1. Wo Xin Bu Bian (我心不变) performed by Tan Jing; 2. Xi You Ge (西游歌) performed by Fei Zhenxiang, Victor Chen, Xie Ning and Mou Fengbin
- Country of origin: China
- Original language: Mandarin
- No. of episodes: 52

Production
- Producer: Cheng Lidong
- Production location: China
- Running time: 45 minutes per episode

Original release
- Network: Zhejiang Television
- Release: 14 February 2010

Journey to the West is a Chinese television series adapted from the 16th-century novel of the same title. The series was directed and produced by Cheng Lidong and starred Zhenxiang, Victor Chen, Xie Ning and Mou Fengbin in the leading roles. It was first aired on Zhejiang Satellite TV (ZJSTV) in China on 14 February 2010. This version is not to be confused with the 2011 television series of the same title produced by Zhang Jizhong.

== List of episodes ==
#	Rough translation of title (in English)	Original title (in Chinese)
1	Birth of the Monkey King	猴王初问世
2	Oath of Fraternity on Flower Fruit Mountain	花果山结义
3	Placed in Charge of Horses	官封弼马温
4	Guardian of the Peach Guardian	看守蟠桃园
5	The Great Sage Wreaks Havoc in the Celestial Palace	大圣闹天宫
6	Battling Erlang Shen	大战二郎神
7	The Jade Emperor Executes the Demonic Monkey	玉帝斩妖猴
8	Imprisoned at Five Elements Mountain	困囚五行山
9	The Monkey King becomes Tang Sanzang's Escort	猴王保唐僧
10	Trouble in the Temple of Guanyin	祸起观音院
11	Slaying Demons in Black Wind Cave	黑风洞除妖
12	Subduing Zhu Bajie by Strategy	计收猪八戒
13	Accepting a Student at Quicksand River	流沙河收徒
14	A Test of Faith by the Four Sages	四圣试禅心
15	Three Battles with the White Bone Demon	三打白骨精
16	Escape from Danger in White Bone Cave	白骨洞脱险
17	Cleverly Instigating the Monkey King	智激美猴王
18	The White Bird Becomes an Immortal	白鸟化成仙
19	Robbing Treasure in Lotus Cave	夺宝莲花洞
20	Defeating Gold and Silver Horns by Wit	智胜金银角
21	Battling the Red Boy	大战红孩儿
22	Subduing the Red Tassel King	巧收红缨王
23	Teaching in Sanqing Temple	大闹三清观
24	Using Magic in Chechi Kingdom	施法车迟国
25	Slaying Three Demons in a Contest of Magic	斗法降三妖
26	A Snowstorm Obstructs the Heaven Crossing River	雪阻通天河
27	Encountering the Azure Bull Demon	贪遇青牛精
28	The Armies of Heaven Fight the Azure Bull	天兵战青牛
29	Interesting Encounter in Women's Country	趣经女儿国
30	Bloodbath at Zimu River	血染子母河
31	Praying to the River	沉江祭河水
32	The Three Disciples Fight the Giant Scorpion	三徒战巨蝎
33	Hitting an Unfilial Son in Anger	怒打不孝子
34	The Real and Fake Monkey King	真假美猴王
35	Difficult Crossing at Inferno Mountain	难过火焰山
36	Taking the Palm Leaf Fan by Cunning	智取芭蕉扇
37	Battling Bull Demon King	大战牛魔王
38	Extinguishing the Samadhi Fire	扑灭三昧火
39	Entering the Little Leiyin Temple by Mistake	误入小雷音
40	Accidental Fall Into the Spiders' Cave	错坠盘丝洞
41	Taking the Pearl in the Stomach by Strategy	计得腹中珠
42	Golden Ray Falls to the Dark Path	金光堕邪渊
43	Encountering and Subduing Demons	降魔遇群妖
44	Obstruction at Lion Camel Ridge	险阻狮驼岭
45	Buddha helps to Subdue a Demon	佛祖助降妖
46	Saving the Albino Rat by Mistake	错救白毛鼠
47	Entering the Bottomless Pit	深入无底洞
48	Coincidental Encounter in India	天竺蹊跷事
49	Identifying the Jade Rabbit	识破玉兔精
50	Resolving a Conflict	干戈化玉帛
51	Arrival at Vulture Peak	辛苦到灵山
52	The Land of Paradise	波生极乐天

== Cast ==
=== Main cast ===
- Fei Zhenxiang as Sun Wukong
- Victor Chen as Tang Sanzang
- Xie Ning as Zhu Bajie
- Mou Fengbin as Sha Wujing
- Wang Shuai as White Dragon Horse

=== Other cast ===
Note: Some cast members played multiple roles.

- Cecilia Han as White Bone Demoness, White Bird Demoness/ Pian Pian
- Joan Chen as Guanyin
- Tang Guoqiang as Jade Emperor
- Wang Like as Azure Dragon Demon King (Qingling), Ruler of Women's Kingdom
- Liu Jia as Queen Mother of the West, Widow Woman
- Fan Zhiqi as Taishang Laojun
- Zhu Yanfei as Buddha
- Sze Yu as Taibai Jinxing
- Eddie Kwan as Li Jing
- Cao Xiwen as Gao Cuilan
- Yin Xiaotian as Erlang Shen
- Vivian Chen as Princess of India, Jade Rabbit, Su'e
- Xu Huanshan as Subhuti
- Cheng Lidong as Ksitigarbha
- Dong Meng as Bull Demon King
- Yu Na as Albino Rat
- Wu Ma as Elder Jinchi
- Lou Qi as Gao Cai
- Zhu Yongteng as Emperor Taizong of Tang
- Xiaohei as Nezha
- Kira Lu as Jade Rabbit Fairy
- Guo Xiaowei as Single Horned King
- He Jianze as Prince Tianyin
- Miao Haizhong as Marshal Tianpeng
- Liu Ying as Chang'e
- Cheng Sihan as Maitreya
- Zhang Qi as King of Spiritual Touch
- Han Dong as Priest Jinguang
- Diana Pang as Baozhu
- Qiu Ye as Sisi
- Yin Shuo as Miansi
- Xue Jiawen as Xiaoqing, Fairy
- Lu Xueting as Xiaohong, Fairy
- Yu Juan as Xiaohua, Fairy
- Jiang Feiyan as Xiaogao
- Zuo Xiannan as Manjusri, Ai'ai
- Gu Xiao as Samantabhadra
- Zhang-yang Guo'er as Mahasthamaprapta
- Meng Yansen as Stone Monkey, Red Boy, Shancai
- Yan Hongding as Apan
- Sun Hao as Ananda, Fire Star
- Sun Qiang as Mahākāśyapa, Golden Horned King
- Liu Tianyue as Zhenzhen
- Lu Jieyun as Lianlian
- Hong Zhibin as Sun Xiaoxiao
- Wu Tongyu as Hui'an
- Zhang Baijun as Squire Gao
- Xu Songzi as Squire Gao's wife
- Gao Junbao as Squire, Abbot of Jinguang Monastery
- Dai Chunrong as Royal Tutor of Women's Kingdom
- Zhou Shiya as Royal Advisor of Women's Kingdom
- Feng Songsong as Pipa Demoness
- Mu Xintong as General in Women's Kingdom
- Mu Qitong as Guard in Women's Kingdom
- Xu Feifei as Old woman in Women's Kingdom
- Zhang Zhongning as Pilanpo Bodhisattva
- Zhou Jiwei as Black Bear Demon
- Li Baolong as Earth Deity, Multiple Armed Ape, Shiba Gong
- Zhang Mingming as Scholar in White Robe
- Zhou Haodong as Squire Kou
- Liu Zifei as Lady Yao
- Li Guangjun as Monkey King
- Sun Yanbin as Monkey Queen
- Wang Gang as King of Chechi
- Shi Jipu as Royal Advisor of Chechi
- Hou Jie as Tiger Power Immortal, King Yama
- Tian Licheng as Elk Power Immortal
- Yang Jun as Antelope Power Immortal
- Zhou Zhong as Yellow Brows, Duke of Thunder
- Chen Rongwei as Silver Horned King, Juling Shen
- Yin Youting as Meticulous Ghost, Guangmou, Mountain Deity, Courier station master
- Wang-yang Xiaohan as Witty Bug, Mo Lihong
- Feng Xiaoqin as Evil Granny
- Han Yinlong as Dragon King of the East Sea
- Xu Xiaoming as Dragon King of the North Sea
- Chen Chao as Dragon King of the South Sea, Single Horned Devil King
- Tang Gang as Dragon King of the West Sea, Azure Lion King
- Liu Feng as Yellow Toothed Elephant, Serpent General
- Xu Jianghua as Great Peng Demon, Boatman
- Han Bo as Mo Liqing, Marshal Kang
- Zhang Ce as Mo Lihai, Demon King of Confusion, Guangzhi
- Xie Zongchen as Mo Lishou, Hairy Head Star
- Meng Zhicheng as Xiaozhuanfeng
- Wu Bin as Jiruhuo
- Luo Laiheng as Kuairufeng
- Yan Ruipeng as Immortal Ruyi
- Li Jun as Priest
- Zhou Mingyang as Liu Boqin, Arhat Fuhu, Gentleman of Mist
- Tian Xiping as Barefoot Immortal
- Zhang Haiping as Xu Jingyang
- Lü Wangqing as Boy
- Shen Yejun as Guangyi, Shui Bo
- Li Na as Fairy, Diya of Baoxiang
- Liu Zhou as Fairy
- Guo Jinying as Fairy, Princess Iron Fan's servant, Mother of Lightning
- Cao Yuanyuan as Fairy
- Li Shengrong as King of Baoxiang
- Li Yulin as Queen of Baoxiang
- Ye Erjiang as King of India
- Zhao Na as Queen of India
- Fang Zhenhua as Golden Light Gate
- Xie Ruiliang as Silver Head Gate
- Zhou Xin as Almond Immortal
- Jiang Shuying as Dragon Girl
- Ren Xuehai as Lingji Bodhisattva
- Liu Chao as Spotted Fish
- Wang Yi as Jade Faced Vixen
- Qi Shenglin as Chen Qing
- Yu Zikuan as Chen Cheng
- Zhou Xuan as Yipengjin
- Zhou Jia'nan as Chen Guanbao
- Sun Jiali as young Yipengjin
- Liu Zi as Princess Iron Fan
- Feng Jiao as Princess Iron Fan's servant
- Wei Si as Turtle General
- Yao Xiaolong as Golden Dragon of Neck
- Shen Shouhe as Dīpankara Buddha
- Wang Jichao as Earth Deity of Fiery Mountain, Arhat Xianglong
- An Ruiyun as Abbot of Zhenhai Monastery, Immortal Jinding
- Yang Lei as King of Shituo
- Zhang Chao as Marshal Zhang
- Jia Lianqiang as Marshal Yao
- Zhang Yang as Marshal Li
- Li Qingxi as Guo Shen
- Song Yujiao as Zhijian
- Fu Tianwu as Judge
- Wang Feng as Ox Head Guard
- Shui Jiajun as Horse Face Guard
- Zhang Xuan as Stable keeper
- Li Zongxian as Stable keeper
- Shi Zhenfei as Little Zhang Crown Prince
- Zhao Zhendong as Yellow Dress Robber
- Mao Jianping as Granny of Wind
- Zheng Jianfan as Boy Who Pushes Clouds

== List of featured songs ==
- Tage Xixing (踏歌西行; Singing on a Journey to the West), the opening theme song, performed by Tengger.
- Wo Xin Bu Bian (我心不变; My Heart Does Not Change), the ending theme song, performed by Tan Jing.
- Xi You Ge (西游歌; Song of a Journey to the West), an alternate ending theme song, performed by Fei Zhenxiang, Victor Chen, Xie Ning and Mou Fengbin.
- Guose Tianxiang Jinzai Xiliang (国色天香尽在西凉; All the Beauties Are in Xiliang) performed by Black Ducks Group (黑鸭子组合).
- Randeng Zhi Ge (燃灯之歌; Song of Lighting a Lamp) performed by Wang Like
- Xin Si Lianhua Kai (心似莲花开; Heart Opens Like a Lotus Blossoming) performed by Victor Chen

== International broadcast ==
- In Sri Lanka, the drama began airing in late 2016 on Rupavahini dubbed in Sinhalese under the title, Maha Wanara.

== See also ==
- Journey to the West (2011 TV series)
- List of media adaptations of Journey to the West
