= Scorpion Demoness =

Demon from the novel Journey to the West

Scorpion Demoness, also known as Xiezijing (Chinese: 蝎子精; pinyin: Xiēzǐ jīng), is a major antagonist from the 16th-century Chinese classic novel Journey to the West and its media adaptations. Her true form is a giant scorpion as large as a pipa. In the narrative, the Scorpion Demoness stands out as the sole character capable of harming both the Buddha and Sun Wukong. Despite the Buddha and Wukong's bodies being as resilient as metal, they are unable to withstand the venomous sting of the Scorpion Demoness's tail.

== Journey to the West ==
The Scorpion Demoness resides in Pipa Cave (琵琶洞) on Venom Mountain (毒敵山), near the Women's Kingdom. When Tang Sanzang and his disciples are about to leave the Women's Kingdom, the scorpion demoness suddenly appears, abducting Sanzang to her cave. There, she attempts to seduce and persuade him into marriage, leading him into the bridal suite she has prepared. Throughout the night, she entices Sanzang, but becomes increasingly annoyed when he refuses to agree to marry her. A playful exchange between the scorpion demoness and Sanzang was shattered by Sun Wukong's sudden arrival. Unimpressed, Wukong intervened, halting the demoness' teasing of his master. Infuriated, the demoness ordered her servants to confine Sanzang and brandished a trident, challenging Wukong to a duel. The battle spilled outside, with Zhu Bajie joining Sun Wukong to face the formidable foe. Despite an extended, fierce fight, neither gained the upper hand. Finally, the demoness unleashed her venomous tail, stinging Sun Wukong's head. Overwhelmed by the excruciating pain, Sun Wukong and Bajie were forced to retreat.

While Sun Wukong is helpless, Guanyin Bodhisattva arrives to guide them, advising them to seek Maori Xingguan for assistance and revealing the demoness's origins. She explains that the demoness once resided in Leiyin Temple (雷音寺). During a Buddha sermon, she inadvertently attracts the Buddha's attention, prompting an accidental push that leads to her retaliation by stinging his left middle finger with her tail, causing significant discomfort. Subsequently, the Buddha orders his disciples to apprehend her, but she manages to evade capture, fleeing to the Pipa Cave in the Women's Kingdom. Sun Wukong visited the Heavenly Palace and extended an invitation to Maori Xingguan. Afterwards, Sun Wukong and Zhu Bajie guided the scorpion spirit out of the cave. Eventually, Maori Xingguan subdues the demoness by transforming into a giant rooster with two combs.

== Character evaluation ==
The Qing dynasty Quanzhen Taoist master Wu Yizi stated that when scorpions become spirits, their poison is unparalleled; when women become licentious and wicked, they harm others even more. The Monkey King injures their head; Zhu Bajie injures their mouth; even the Tathāgata feels unbearable pain, and the Bodhisattvas dare not approach. All describe her poison as irresistible. She is not a woman shaped like a scorpion, but rather a woman who acts like a scorpion. These women of pleasure are seductive and follow a deviant path, straying from the true purpose of seeking scripture. If one is wounded by their manipulative ways, they will surely be poisoned. If one cannot maintain their true nature and becomes entangled with them, they will not only harm their own character but also endanger their life. When encountering women of pleasure, one should use their true nature to cultivate their destiny, for one's life is protected by their character.

Essayist Li Jing observed that the Scorpion Demoness's love for Tang Sanzang is remarkably pure. In her own words, she expresses, "If I am a Taoist companion with you, we will be in harmony for a hundred years." Even demons emphasize the importance of shared values in love. In other words, their love is based on mutual understanding, not just lust. The depth of emotion exhibited by the demoness can truly move someone to tears. It's truly pitiful; if she hadn't met Tang Sanzang, if she hadn't fallen in love with him, perhaps she would have peacefully remained a demon in her place. Why did she fall in love with this man? Why sacrifice her life for this fleeting affection? Is it worth it?

Zhu Hongbo (竺洪波), a professor in the Chinese Department at East China Normal University, remarks: When it comes to other demons, Sun Wukong may initially struggle to defeat them, often due to the demons possessing magical treasures. However, the Scorpion Demoness is different; she relies solely on her own abilities. The poison needles in her scorpion tail are an integral part of her prowess, so no matter how cunning Sun Wukong's tactics are, he's still contending with the Scorpion Demoness's true skill. From this perspective, the Scorpion Spirit's martial arts skills are definitely top-notch. Capable of fighting and killing, she possesses a strong spirit of struggle. When facing Tang Sanzang, she strives to exhibit the tender affection typical of women. Moreover, her remarkably high level of concern for her appearance is perhaps the most exaggerated among all women, whether in the heavens, on earth, or in the underworld.

== In other media ==
The Scorpion Demoness is the main character in the sequel Chinese films of Journey to the West, such as Dream of Monsters: Scorpion Demoness and the Kingdom of Women (妖梦西游之蝎精女儿国) in 2020 and Great Dream Journey to the West 3: Adventures in the Kingdom of Women (大梦西游3女儿国奇遇记) in 2017.

=== Television series ===
Year	Title	Actor	Note
1982	Journey to the West	Li Yunjuan	CCTV version
2010	Journey to the West	Feng Songsong	
2011	Journey to the West	Zhao Wenqi	
