= Zhizhujing =

Journey to the West characters

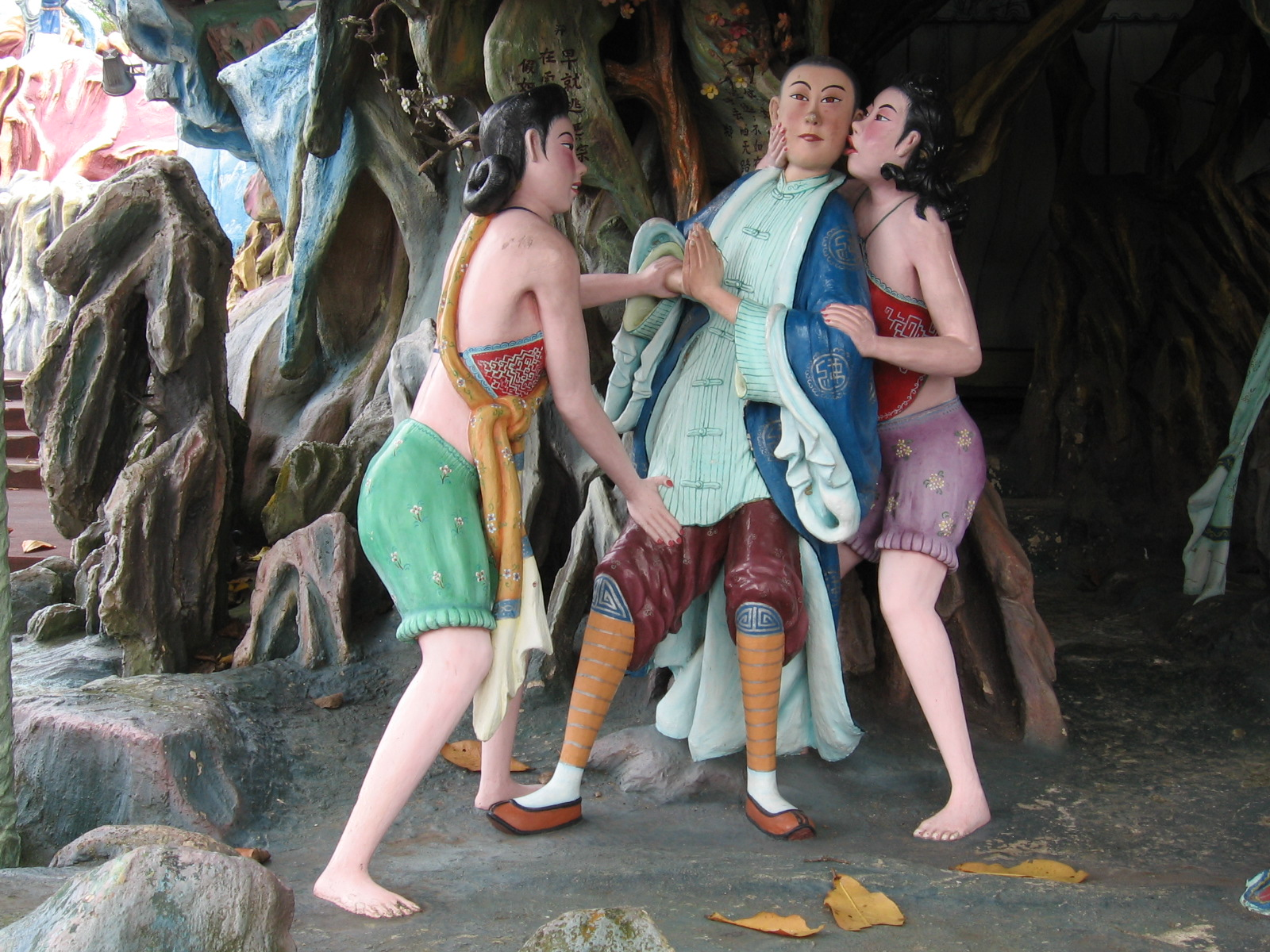
Diorama at Haw Par Villa, Singapore, depicting two of the Spider Demonesses trying to seduce Tang Sanzang.

Zhizhujing (Chinese: 蜘蛛精; pinyin: Zhīzhūjīng; lit. 'Spider demons') are seven female yaoguai in the 16th-century Chinese novel Journey to the West. They live in Pansi Cave (盤絲洞) and can take the form of beautiful young women. They capture Tang Sanzang and plan to eat him. They later fight Sun Wukong and his companions.

== Appearance in Journey to the West ==
The seven spider demons appear in Chapters 72 and 73 of the 16th-century novel Journey to the West. They live in Pansi Cave (盤絲洞, "Coiled Silk Cave") and can take the form of beautiful young women. When Tang Sanzang goes to ask for food, he meets the seven women outside their home. They invite him inside and offer him food made from human flesh. He refuses to eat it and tries to leave, but the demons capture him and hang him from the ceiling. They plan to steam and eat him because they believe his flesh can give them a longer life.

Sun Wukong searches for his master and learns that the demons have gone to bathe at Zhuogou Spring (濯垢泉). He follows them and takes their clothes while they are in the water. Zhu Bajie then goes to fight them, but the demons trap him with silk that comes from their navels. They return to their cave and send their seven adopted sons, who are insect spirits, to stop Wukong and the others. Wukong defeats the insects and rescues Tang Sanzang. The group then leaves the cave.

The spider demons flee to Huanghua Temple (黃花觀), where their senior fellow disciple, the Hundred-Eyed Demon Lord, lives. He is a centipede demon who takes the form of a Daoist priest. When Tang Sanzang and his disciples arrive at the temple, the spider demons ask him for help. He gives the visitors poisoned tea, causing Tang Sanzang, Zhu Bajie, and Sha Wujing to fall unconscious. Wukong escapes the trap and fights the demons. He uses his magic to pull the seven spiders out of their web. When the Hundred-Eyed Demon Lord refuses to release his companions, Wukong kills all seven spiders with his staff.

Wukong then fights the Hundred-Eyed Demon Lord, but the demon uses a powerful golden light to stop him. Wukong later asks Pilanpo for help. She breaks the golden light with a special needle and gives Wukong medicine to save his master and fellow disciples. She also makes the demon return to his true form as a large centipede and takes him away.

== Interpretations ==
The seven spider demons are seen as the seven emotions (七情): joy, anger, sorrow, fear, love, hate, and desire. In his Qing dynasty commentary on Journey to the West, the Daoist writer Liu Yiming explains that these emotions can lead people away from the Dao. He compares the spiders' web to desire and false teachings that trap people and keep them from following the right path.

Liu Yongqiang (劉勇強) explains that the spiders' silk stands for emotional ties (情絲). Zhu Bajie becomes trapped in their web because he cannot control his desire. This also explains the title of Chapter 72, which speaks of the seven emotions and Bajie losing control of himself.

Zhang Yiwei discusses the spider demons' link to the Seven Fairies (七仙女) in Chinese folklore. She cites Li Tianfei, who believes that the scene in which the spiders are bathing comes from the story of Dong Yong and the Seven Fairies. Both stories involve women bathing and having their clothes taken away. In the novel, the spiders have also taken over the bathing pool that once belonged to the Seven Fairies.

A literary study of the spider demons compares their story with the Guhuoniao (姑獲鳥) tale from the ancient text Xuanzhong Ji (玄中記). In that story, a man steals the feather clothing of bird-women, leaving one unable to fly away. The study also points out that the spider demons behave like ordinary young women. They sew clothes, play games, and welcome Tang Sanzang into their home. However, the food they prepare for him is made from human flesh. Their normal behaviour hides their true nature as demons.

== Other spider spirits ==
Spider spirits also appear in other Chinese stories. In Yiyuan (異苑), a man continues to see a maid after her death. His mother later finds a large spider visiting him and kills it. In Zibuyu (子不語), a man named Zhu in Haizhou can shoot long webs from his mouth. People believe that he may be a spider spirit.

== In popular culture ==
The story of the spider demons in Pansi Cave has been adapted in several films and other works based on Journey to the West. The 1927 silent film The Cave of the Silken Web, directed by Dan Duyu, is considered China's first fantasy film and features spider demons as the central antagonists. The film was thought to be lost for decades until a copy was rediscovered in Norway in 2011. The story was later adapted by Shaw Brothers Studio in the 1967 film The Cave of the Silken Web, which featured a more elaborate portrayal of the spider spirits.

The spider sisters also appear in the 2024 video game Black Myth: Wukong. The game establishes that Violet Spider was once a courtier of the Celestial Court and had a relationship with Zhu Bajie when he was still Marshal Tianpeng. After they were separated, Violet Spider became a spider guai and later lived with her eight daughters in Webbed Hollow. Zhu Bajie later returns to Webbed Hollow with the Destined One while searching for the fourth relic of Sun Wukong, the Envious Tongue. Violet Spider possesses the relic, which is later taken from her by the Hundred-Eyed Daoist. Violet Spider and her daughters then fight the Hundred-Eyed Daoist alongside the Destined One, but Violet Spider is killed in the battle.
