= Hundred-Eyed Demon Lord =

Journey to the West character

- Traditional Chinese: 百眼魔君
- Simplified Chinese: 百眼魔君
Transcriptions
Standard Mandarin
- Hanyu Pinyin: Bǎiyǎn Mójūn

Centipede Demon
- Traditional Chinese: 蜈蚣精
- Simplified Chinese: 蜈蚣精
Transcriptions
Standard Mandarin
- Hanyu Pinyin: Wúgōng jīng

The Hundred-Eyed Demon Lord (Chinese: 百眼魔君; pinyin: Bǎiyǎn Mójūn), also known as the Centipede Demon (Chinese: 蜈蚣精; pinyin: Wúgōng jīng), is an antagonist from the 16th-century Chinese classic novel Journey to the West. A giant centipede in his true form, he disguises himself as a Daoist priest and is among the most powerful demons encountered by Sun Wukong during the pilgrimage.

== Role in Journey to the West ==
The Hundred-Eyed Demon Lord appears in Chapter 73 of Journey to the West. Tang Sanzang and his disciples stop at Yellow Flower Temple (黃花觀) to rest and ask for food. The temple is run by a Daoist who studied with the seven spider demons from Webbed Hollow (盤絲洞). The spiders had earlier tried to capture Tang Sanzang but were stopped by Sun Wukong and Zhu Bajie. They come to the temple and ask the Daoist to take revenge. He agrees and puts poison into red dates before serving them in tea.

Tang Sanzang, Zhu Bajie and Sha Wujing drink the tea and fall to the ground. Wukong sees that his own tea is different and does not drink it. He breaks his cup and fights the Daoist. The seven spider demons come to help, but Wukong kills them. He then fights the Daoist again. After losing strength in the fight, the demon takes off his robe and shows a thousand eyes under his arms. The eyes give off a strong golden light and yellow mist that trap Wukong. The light is so hot that Wukong cannot bear it. He turns into a pangolin and digs underground to escape.

Wukong later meets an old woman who tells him that the demon is known as the Hundred-Eyed Demon Lord. She tells him to seek help from Pilanpo, a bodhisattva who lives at Thousand Flower Cave on Purple Cloud Mountain. The woman then reveals herself as Lishan Laomu. Wukong goes to the mountain and asks Pilanpo for help. She tells him that she has a magical embroidery needle made by her son, Maori Xingguan, in the eye of the sun.

Pilanpo goes with Wukong to Yellow Flower Temple. When they see the golden light, she throws her needle into the air and breaks its power. The demon closes his eyes and can no longer move. Wukong tries to kill him, but Pilanpo stops him. She makes the demon show his true form, a giant centipede about seven feet long. Pilanpo then takes him to Thousand Flower Cave to guard its entrance. She also gives Wukong three pills to cure the poisoned pilgrims. After taking the pills, Tang Sanzang and his two disciples recover and continue their journey.

== Interpretations ==
Literary scholar Zheng Mingli sees the Hundred-Eyed Demon Lord as a criticism of Daoist alchemy in the Ming dynasty. She links the Yellow Flower Temple and the demon's poison to the Jiajing Emperor, who trusted Daoist priests and tried to find medicines that could make him live forever. Zheng argues that Wu Cheng'en used the story to make fun of these practices.

Literary scholar Yang Yi (杨义) uses the demon's defeat to explain the idea of "one thing subdues another" (一物降一物). Sun Wukong cannot defeat the monster's golden light, but Pilanpo, whom Yang describes as a hen, breaks it with an embroidery needle. Yang compares this story with other demons defeated by gods linked to birds and animals from the Twenty-Eight Mansions. He says these stories show how different animals have their own powers and can overcome one another. He sees this as a way of showing how the world is kept in order.

In his Qing dynasty commentary Xiyouji Baihui Xiangzhu (西遊記百回詳注), the Daoist scholar Liu Yiming gives another reading of the story. He says the demon's poison shows the danger of trying to make medicines for immortality by heating minerals in a furnace. Liu warns that these medicines can harm or kill people. He also sees Pilanpo's embroidery needle as a sign of a kind and honest heart. For Liu, the story teaches that people should do good deeds instead of looking for immortality through harmful medicines.

== In popular culture ==
The Hundred-Eyed Demon Lord appears as the main antagonist in the 2022 animated film The Westward: Cave of the Qiongqi (西行纪之穷奇地洞), a spin-off of the Hong Kong manhua The Westward.

=== Black Myth: Wukong ===
The Hundred-Eyed Demon Lord appears as the final boss of Chapter 4 in the 2024 action role-playing game Black Myth: Wukong. The game expands his relationship with the Spider Demons, portraying them as his martial junior sisters. In this adaptation, he is depicted as a ruthless Daoist alchemist who manipulates the Spider Sisters and uses them as tools in his pursuit of greater power and immortality.

== See also ==
- List of Journey to the West characters
- Sun Wukong
- Spider Demonesses
