= Ri Ye Youshen =

Pair of deities in Chinese folk religion

Ri Ye Youshen (simplified Chinese: 日夜游神; traditional Chinese: 日夜遊神; pinyin: Rìyè Yóushén; lit. 'Day and Night Wandering Gods'), also called Ri Ye Youxun (日夜遊巡), are two gods in Chinese folk religion and Taoism. They are the Day Wandering God (日遊神) and the Night Wandering God (夜遊神). They watch over the human world during the day and night and report people's good and bad deeds to other gods. In Taiwan, they serve gods such as Dongyue Dadi and the City God.

In older stories, meeting these gods was sometimes seen as a sign of bad luck. Later folk beliefs also describe them as officials working for underworld gods, including Yanluo Wang.

== In literature ==
The Classic of Mountains and Seas (山海經) describes sixteen divine beings who stand arm in arm and watch over the night for the Heavenly Emperor. They are said to live east of the Land of the Feathered People (羽民國). The book does not call them Night Wandering Gods, but later comments on the text connect them with that name.

The Yuan dynasty play Taohua Nü Po Fa Jia Zhougong (桃花女破法嫁周公), written by Wang Ye (王曄), describes the Day Wandering God as a dangerous spirit. In the third act, Zhougong chooses a wedding day when Taohua Nü is expected to meet the god and suffer harm. She avoids the danger by having someone carry a sieve in front of her. Zhougong later says that the sieve had driven the god away.

In the Ming dynasty novel Fengshen Yanyi (封神演義), the two gods are given personal names. Chapter 99 names Wen Liang (溫良) as the Day Wandering God and Qiao Kun (喬坤) as the Night Wandering God. Both are listed among the gods serving Tai Sui, who is responsible for the fortunes of each year.

The Night Wandering God also appears in Zuicha Zhiguai (醉茶志怪), a collection of strange stories written by Li Qingchen (李慶辰) during the Qing dynasty. One story tells of a man named Wang who sees a giant sitting on the roof of a building at night. The giant blocks his way with its foot. Wang returns home but dies a few days later.

The same book tells of another man who sees a giant sitting on a roof near a bridge. The giant wears a wide robe and an official's hat. The man is frightened, but the giant soon disappears. This man returns home safely.

== Worship and appearance ==
In Taiwan, the Day and Night Wandering Gods appear among the attendants of the City God and Dongyue Dadi. They are also represented by large figures called dashenwang (大神尪), which are carried by people during temple processions.

At Toucheng City God Temple (頭城城隍廟) in Yilan County, the Day Wandering God has a white face and wears a light blue robe with phoenix and peony designs. He wears a tall square hat and carries a huoqian (火籤). The Night Wandering God has a black face and wears a black robe with phoenix and lotus designs. He also wears a tall square hat and carries a huopai (火牌). Both figures belong to the Fuan Society (福安社).

At Toucheng Dongyue Temple (頭城東嶽廟), the Day Wandering God is shown with a white or pink face and a green robe, while the Night Wandering God has a black face and a blue robe. The temple has two pairs of these figures, one large and one small. The smaller pair may date from the Japanese colonial period. In the past, children carried these smaller figures during processions. The figures belong to the Xing'an Society (興安堂).

The Day and Night Wandering Gods also take part in the temple processions held for the birthdays of the City God and Dongyue Dadi in Toucheng. The processions include other underworld attendants, such as the Black and White Impermanence gods.
