= Kuimulang =

Deity in traditional Chinese belief

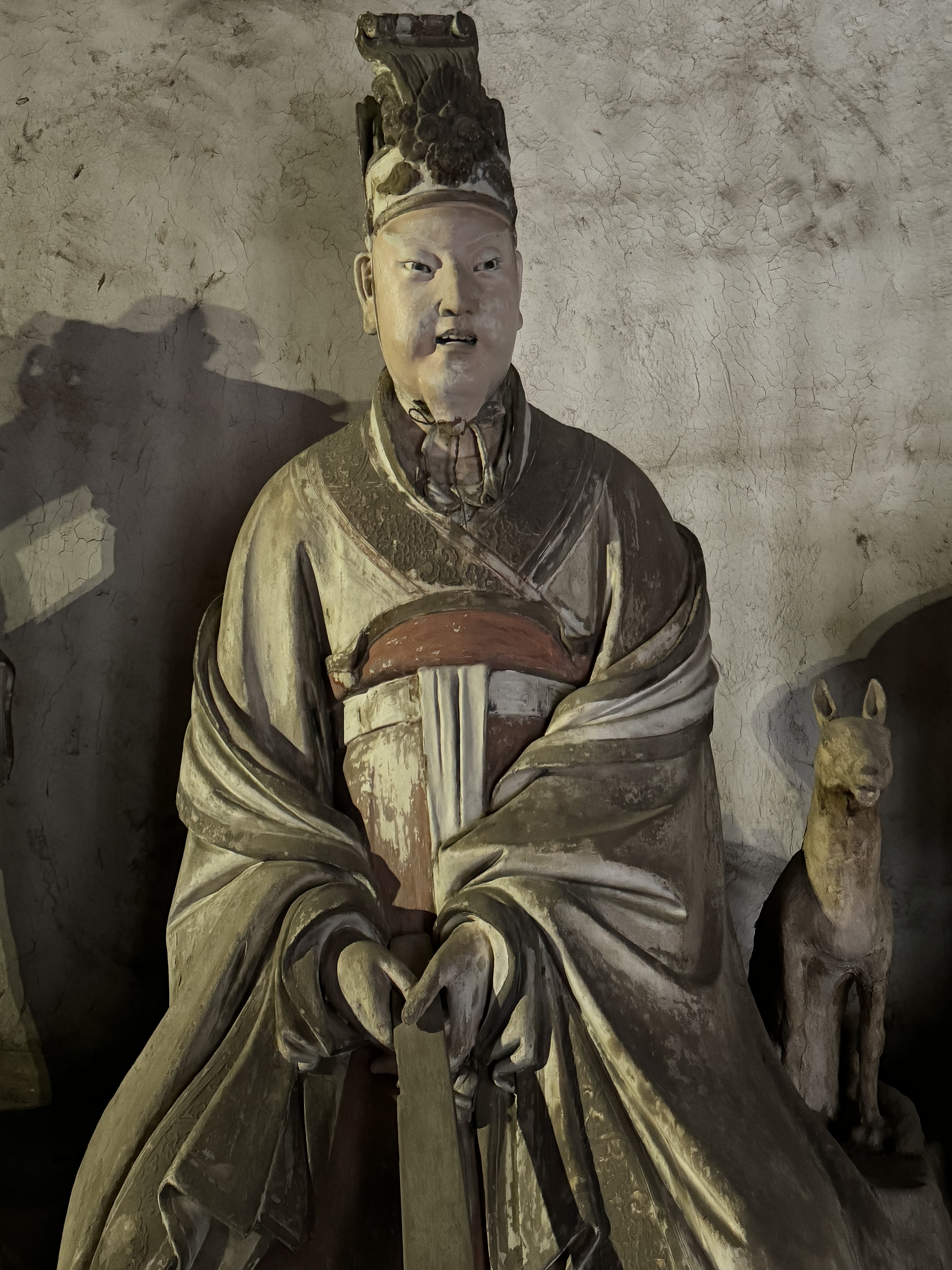
- Statue of Kuimulang in the Jade Emperor Temple, Fucheng
- Traditional Chinese: 奎木狼
- Simplified Chinese: 奎木狼
- Literal meaning: The Wood Wolf of Legs
Transcriptions
Standard Mandarin
- Hanyu Pinyin: Kuí Mùláng

Kuimulang (Chinese: 奎木狼; lit. 'Wood Wolf of Kui') is a star deity in Chinese mythology and Taoism. He represents Kui Xiu (奎宿), one of the Twenty-Eight Mansions in traditional Chinese astronomy. Kui is the first of the seven mansions of the White Tiger of the West.

Kuimulang appears in the novels Journey to the West and Fengshen Yanyi. In Journey to the West, he becomes the Yellow Robe Demon. In Fengshen Yanyi, Jiang Ziya appoints Li Xiong (李雄) as Kuimulang. Some traditions also identified him with Ma Wu, a general of the Eastern Han dynasty.

== Astrology ==
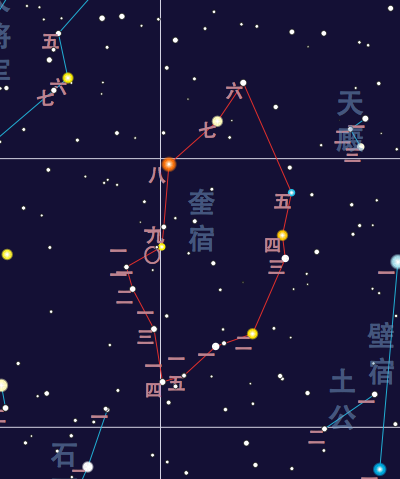
Star map of Kui Xiu

Kuimulang takes his name from Kui Xiu (奎宿), one of the twenty-eight lunar mansions in Chinese astronomy. Kui Xiu is the first of the seven mansions of the White Tiger of the West. It contains sixteen stars in the modern constellations Andromeda and Pisces. Ancient Chinese star charts show the stars in a shape resembling an old shoe. The name Kuimulang (奎木狼) combines Kui with the words for wood (木) and wolf (狼).

In Buddhist astrology, Kui Xiu is one of the four "gentle mansions" (和善宿), together with Zui (觜), Jiao (角), and Fang (房). The Xiuyao Jing (宿曜經) also places Kui within the Fish Palace (魚宮), a division of the zodiac that includes parts of the Shi (室), Bi (壁), and Kui mansions.

Kui Xiu was also linked to writing and success in the imperial examinations. The name Kui Xing (奎星) was later linked with Kuixing (魁星), a god of literature and examinations. The two names have different Chinese characters, although they became closely connected in folk belief.

== Depictions ==
The Ming dynasty text Wubian (武編) by Tang Shunzhi describes Kuimulang as a figure with a wolf's head and a dark face. He is five chi tall and wears black robes, yellow armor decorated with golden flowers, and black shoes. He carries a double-edged sword.

== Legends ==
=== Fengshen Yanyi ===
In Investiture of the Gods (Fengshen Yanyi), Kuimulang was originally named Li Xiong (李雄). He dies in the Battle of the Ten Thousand Immortals. After the battle, Jiang Ziya appoints him as Kuimulang, the Wood Wolf of Kui, one of the Twenty-Eight Mansions.

=== Journey to the West ===
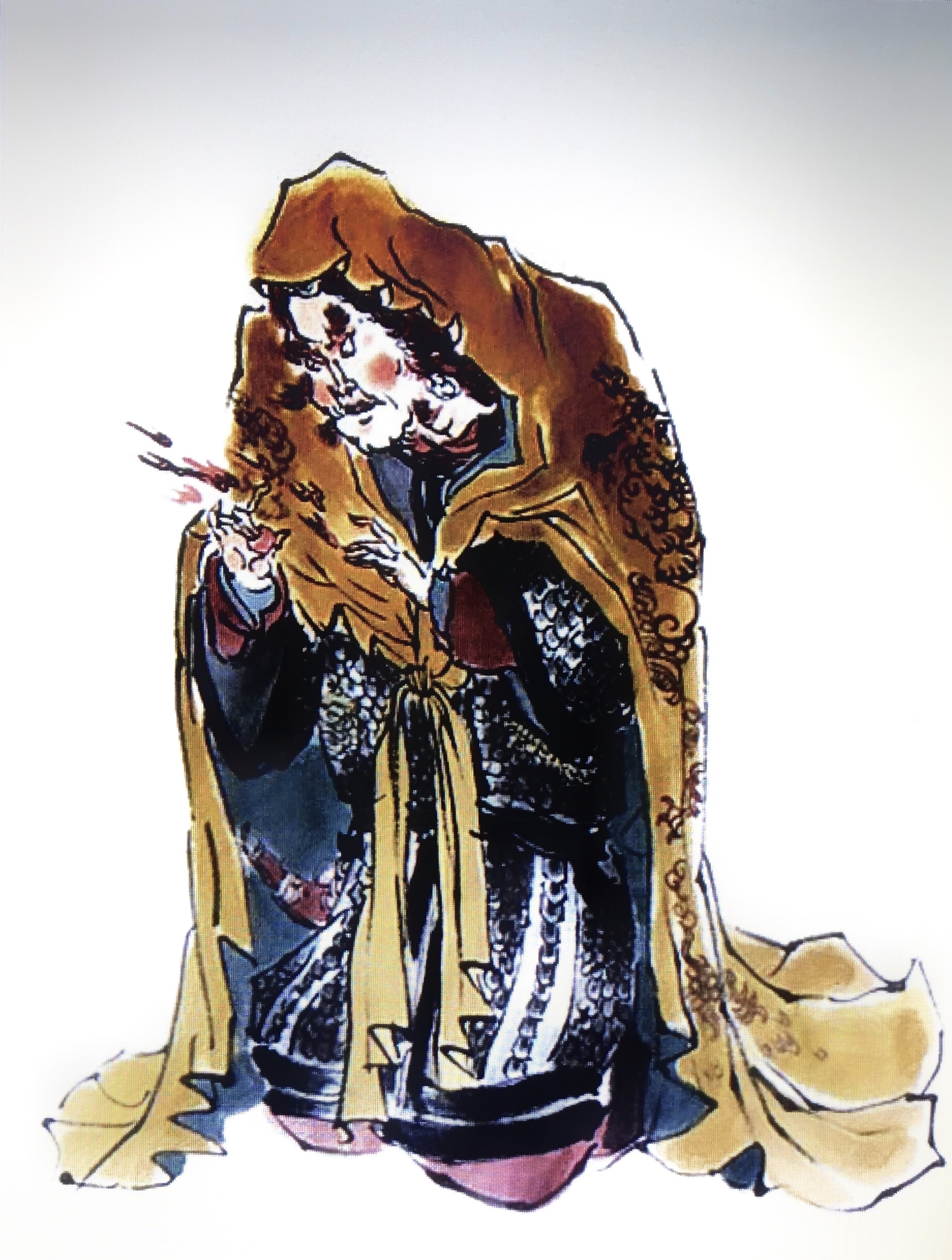
Painting of Kuimulang

In Journey to the West, Kuimulang appears as the Yellow Robe Demon (黃袍怪). He lives in Moon Waves Cave (波月洞) on Bowl Mountain (碗子山), near the Kingdom of Baoxiang (寶象國). He wears a yellow robe, has a blue face and sharp teeth, and fights with a large sword. He has taken Baihuaxiu (百花羞), the third princess of Baoxiang, as his wife. They have lived together for thirteen years and have two sons.

After Sun Wukong is sent away by Tang Sanzang, the monk travels through the Black Pine Forest with Zhu Bajie and Sha Wujing. He enters the demon's cave and is captured. The demon plans to eat him, but Baihuaxiu offers to help. She tells Tang Sanzang that the demon took her from her father's palace thirteen years earlier. She asks him to carry a letter to her parents. She then persuades the demon to release him.

When the king of Baoxiang reads his daughter's letter, he asks Zhu Bajie and Sha Wujing to rescue her. They return to the mountain and fight the demon, but Sha Wujing is captured. The Yellow Robe Demon then changes into a handsome man and visits the royal palace. He tells the king that Tang Sanzang is a tiger spirit. Using magic, he turns the monk into a tiger and has him locked in a cage. Later that night, the demon reveals his true form and kills a palace maid. White Dragon Horse, who has been carrying Tang Sanzang, changes into a young woman and tries to fight him. The demon wounds him, and he escapes. Zhu Bajie then returns to Mount Huaguo to ask Sun Wukong for help.

Sun Wukong returns and captures the demon's two sons. He uses them to make Baihuaxiu release Sha Wujing. Zhu Bajie and Sha Wujing later kill the two children outside the royal palace. Sun Wukong hides the princess and takes her appearance. When the demon returns to his cave, Wukong pretends to be heartbroken over the loss of the children. The demon tries to comfort him with a magical pearl that he has made through years of cultivation. Wukong takes the pearl and swallows it. The demon discovers the trick, and the two fight. After several rounds, Wukong strikes him with his staff, but the demon disappears.

Sun Wukong goes to Heaven to find out who the demon is. The Jade Emperor orders the heavenly officials to check the stars. They discover that Kuimulang, one of the Twenty-Eight Mansions, has been missing for thirteen days in Heaven, equal to thirteen years on Earth. The other twenty-seven star gods are sent to bring him back. Kuimulang then explains that Baihuaxiu was once a Jade Maiden (玉女) who served in the Pixiang Hall (披香殿). They had fallen in love in Heaven and agreed to meet on Earth. The maiden was reborn as the princess of Baoxiang, while Kuimulang left Heaven and became the Yellow Robe Demon. The Jade Emperor punishes him by sending him to the Tushita Palace to work at Taishang Laojun's furnace. He may return to his former position after earning merit. Sun Wukong then brings Baihuaxiu back to her family and restores Tang Sanzang to his human form.

Kuimulang appears again in Chapter 92. The Jade Emperor sends him and three other star gods, Jiaomujiao (角木蛟), Doumuxie (斗木獬), and Jingmuan (井木犴), to help Sun Wukong fight three rhinoceros demons at Qinglong Mountain. The four are called the Four Wood Stars (四木禽星). When the demons see them, they flee. Kuimulang and Doumuxie defeat the smaller demons and rescue Tang Sanzang, Zhu Bajie, and Sha Wujing from Xuanying Cave (玄英洞). They later join Sun Wukong in pursuing the three rhinoceros demons toward the Western Sea.

=== In folklore and opera ===
In some folk traditions, Kuimulang is identified with Ma Wu, a general of the Eastern Han dynasty and one of the Yuntai 28 Generals. A Qing dynasty Yangliuqing New Year print of the Twenty-Eight Mansions names him Kuimulang Ma Wu (奎木狼馬武). The other mansions are also named after generals who served Emperor Guangwu of Han. A similar print from Taohuawu in Suzhou shows the twenty-eight generals, including Ma Wu, with flags bearing the animals of the lunar mansions.

In Peking opera, Kuimulang appears in Da Po Wanxian Zhen (大破萬仙陣) as Li Xiong, a member of the Jie Sect. In another opera tradition, he is reborn on Earth as Ma Wu and helps Emperor Guangwu restore the Han dynasty. This story appears in Da Jinzhuan (打金磚). Ma Wu also appears in Qu Luoyang (取洛陽). Kuimulang's opera makeup has a golden face, grey eyebrows, and black and red markings on the forehead showing a wolf's tail. He also appears among the star gods in An Tian Hui (安天會) and Hunyuan He (混元盒).

In Shaping Village (沙坪村), Jia County, Shaanxi, the traditional Twenty-Eight Mansions Yangge (二十八宿秧歌) tells the story of Emperor Guangwu's war against Wang Mang. Ma Wu and other generals wear battle robes and carry weapons. The performance also includes temple visits and dances based on the twenty-eight lunar mansions. In the same region, some carpenters traditionally called their saws Kuimulang (奎木狼).

== Interpretations ==
Cheng Yunlei discusses Kuimulang's love for the heavenly maid who was later reborn as Princess Baihuaxiu. He regards their story as a tragic romance. The two had agreed to meet on Earth, but the princess lost her memories of their former love after her rebirth. They lived together for thirteen years and had two sons. However, the princess wanted to return to her parents. Their story ended with the deaths of their sons and Kuimulang's punishment in Heaven.

During the Qing dynasty, Daoist commentators such as Wang Xiangxu, Chen Shibin, and Liu Yiming read Journey to the West as a work about spiritual cultivation. In his commentary Xiyou Yuanzhi (西遊原旨), Liu Yiming gave the Yellow Robe Demon a meaning in Daoist internal alchemy. He explained that "Yellow" (黃) represents Earth (土), while "Robe" (袍) means a covering. After Sun Wukong, who represents Metal (金), is sent away by Tang Sanzang, the Yellow Robe Demon appears. Liu saw the demon as "False Earth" (假土), which becomes harmful when Metal is absent. Wang Wanzhen discusses this reading in her study of Liu's commentary.

Writer Sa Su compared Kuimulang with wolves from northern Asia. He suggested that the demon's yellow robe might come from the yellow-brown fur of Mongolian grassland wolf. He also noted that Wood (木) in Kuimulang's name represents the east in the Five Phases system. He therefore suggested that the character might have been based on a Siberian wolf, which lives in northeastern Asia.
