= Dizang Temple Sutra Pillar =

Buddhist stone pillar in Kunming, China

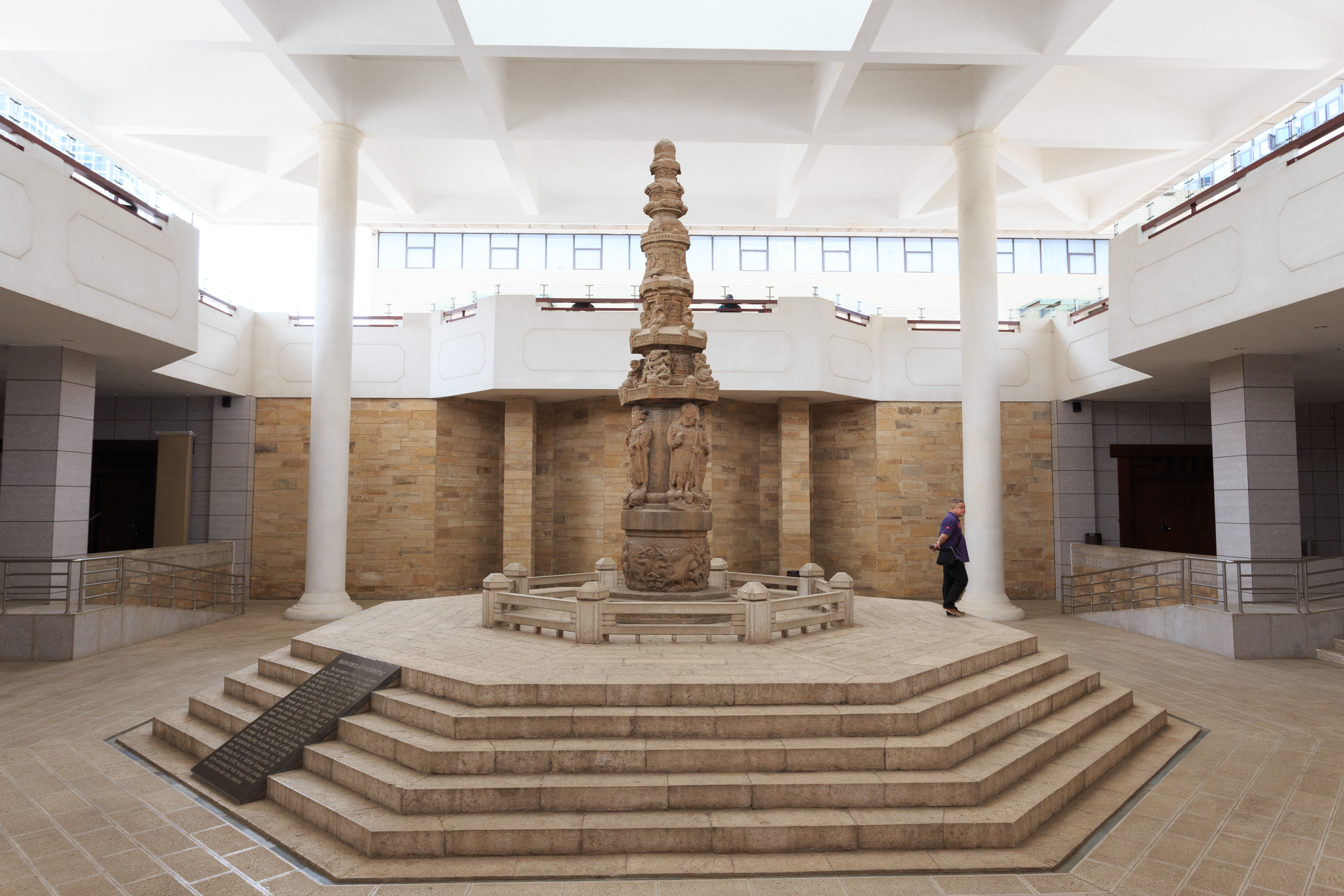
Dizang Temple Sutra Pillar

Dizang Temple Sutra Pillar (simplified Chinese: 地藏寺经幢; traditional Chinese: 地藏寺經幢; pinyin: Dìzàng Sì Jīngchuáng), also known as the Dali Kingdom Sutra Pillar (大理國經幢), is a Buddhist stone pillar in Kunming, Yunnan, China. It was built during the Dali Kingdom in the 12th century and now stands inside the Kunming City Museum. The pillar was made under the direction of Yuan Douguang (袁豆光), an official of the Dali Kingdom.

== History ==
The pillar stood at Dizang Temple, dedicated to Kṣitigarbha (Dizang), which was destroyed in 1857. After flooding covered much of the site with soil, the pillar was rediscovered in 1919. In 1923, the local government built Guzhuang Park (古幢公園) around it. The pillar was declared a Major Historical and Cultural Site Protected at the National Level in 1982. The Kunming City Museum was built around the pillar and opened in 1997.

== Description ==
The pillar is 6.7 metres tall, with seven tiers and eight sides. It is made of five sandstone sections joined together. About 300 figures of Buddhas, bodhisattvas, heavenly kings, and other Buddhist deities are carved on its surface. It also bears four Chinese inscriptions and more than 2,000 Sanskrit characters from the Uṣṇīṣavijayā Dhāraṇī Sūtra.
