= Six-Eared Macaque =

Fictional character in Journey to the West

- Journey to the West character
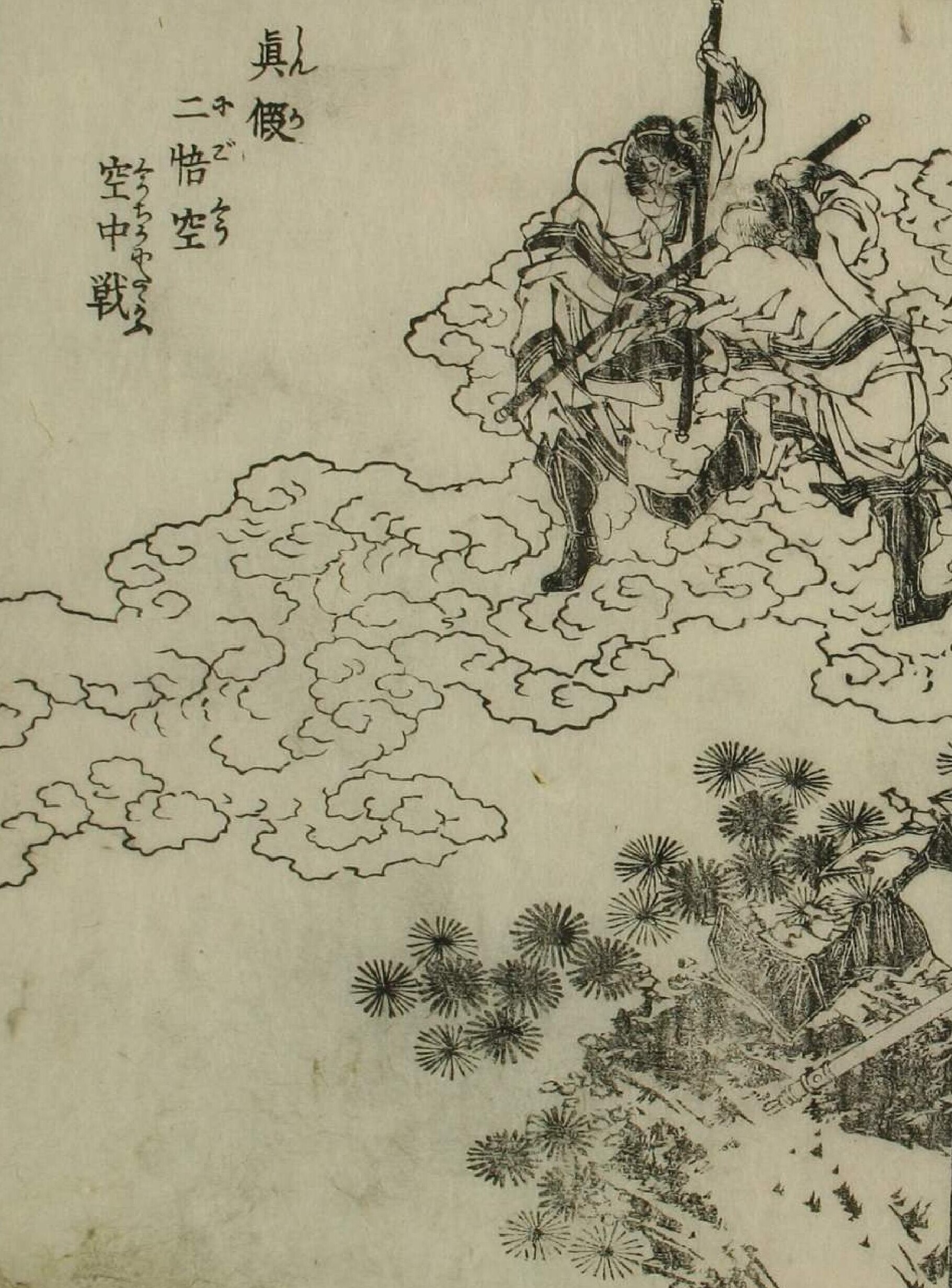
- Sun Wukong (Monkey King) fights his impostor, the Six-Eared Macaque. From an illustration by the Japanese artist Ōhara Tōya (1771–1840).
- First appearance: Chapter 57
- Last appearance: Chapter 58
- Created by: Wu Cheng'en

In-universe information
- Alias: Fake Wukong
- Species: Macaque
- Status: Killed by Sun Wukong

The Six-Eared Macaque (Chinese: 六耳獼猴; pinyin: Liù'ěr míhóu) is a major antagonist and one of the most powerful characters in Wu Cheng'en's fantasy novel Journey to the West, best remembered for closely impersonating Sun Wukong (Monkey King).

== In Journey to the West ==
The Six-Eared Macaque—and not to be mistaken for the Macaque King (獼猴王), one of the same Seven Sages (七聖) Fraternity of Sworn Brothers, that Sun Wukong is a member of—is, according to the Buddha, one of the four spiritual primates that do not belong to any of the ten categories that all beings in the universe are classified under. The other three are the Intelligent Stone Monkey (靈明石猴), Red-Buttock Baboon (赤尻馬猴), and Interconnected-Arm Gibbon. Buddha also says that the Six-Eared Macaque is "near-omniscient" (thanks to his six ears eavesdropping upon many tidbits of information around him far and wide), "knowledgeable of past and future" and "comprehensive of all things". As he and Sun Wukong are both spiritual primates, their powers and abilities are on par. Hoping to replace Sun Wukong and gain his rewards from the Buddha in Sun Wukong's place, the Six-Eared Macaque first appears in Xiliang (西粱) in disguise as Sun Wukong. He knocks Tang Sanzang unconscious and steals the baggage and paperwork which he takes to Flower-Fruit Mountain to set up his own pilgrim band. He fights with the real Sun Wukong and neither is able to overcome his opponent. No one is able to differentiate between the real and the fake Sun Wukong—the Six-Eared Macaque's spell of impersonation is so good that he also responds to the "Headache Sutra", preventing the pilgrims from differentiating between him and Sun Wukong—until the two appear before the Buddha, who tells them about the four spiritual primates. The Six-Eared Macaque attempts to flee when he hears the Buddha speak about his true identity, but the Buddha traps him under a giant golden alms bowl. The macaque is then killed by Sun Wukong.

== Interpretations ==
The Six-eared Macaque's name is a likely nod to the old saying that "a secret is not safe between six ears"; his name is also thought to be a nod towards the concept of Āyatana (the six senses in Buddhist philosophy). The Six-eared Macaque is also thought to represent the double-mindedness/double-heartedness in Sun Wukong himself.

Hongmei Sun argues that Sun Wukong's killing of his peer, rival and doppelgänger is "self-contradiction to an extreme", especially since the Six-Eared Macaque has already been trapped by the Buddha which parallels Wukong's own capture in the novel's early chapters. To Wukong, the Six-Eared Macaque represents "the monster in him", "a self whose boundary has just been pinned down", and his elimination symbolizes Wukong's personal progress in achieving Buddhahood and freedom.

The story has also been interpreted in Buddhist terms. Chapter 58 is titled "Two Minds cause disturbance in the great universe..." (二心攪亂大乾坤) and contains a poem that begins with "If one has two minds, disasters he'll breed" (人有二心生禍災). Monkey symbolizes the mind in Chinese Buddhism, and the two monkeys are likely metaphors for zhenxin (真心; "true mind") and wangxin (妄心; "false mind"), being opposite yet indistinguishable—because they are, in fact, one. In this sense, killing Six-Eared Macaque in a swift blow enables Wukong to recognize "the true oneness", or tathātā, to his nature.

Hoong Teik Toh believes that this episode is derived from the Indian epic Ramayana (which contains the story of the brothers Vali and Sugriva who appear indistinguishable to Rama during their battle) but did not offer any evidence.

== In other works ==
The Six-Eared Macaque is reincarnated in one of the earliest unofficial sequels to Xiyouji, the Ming dynasty Xu Xiyouji (續西遊記; "Sequel to the Journey of the West").
