= Maori Xingguan =

Deity in traditional Chinese belief

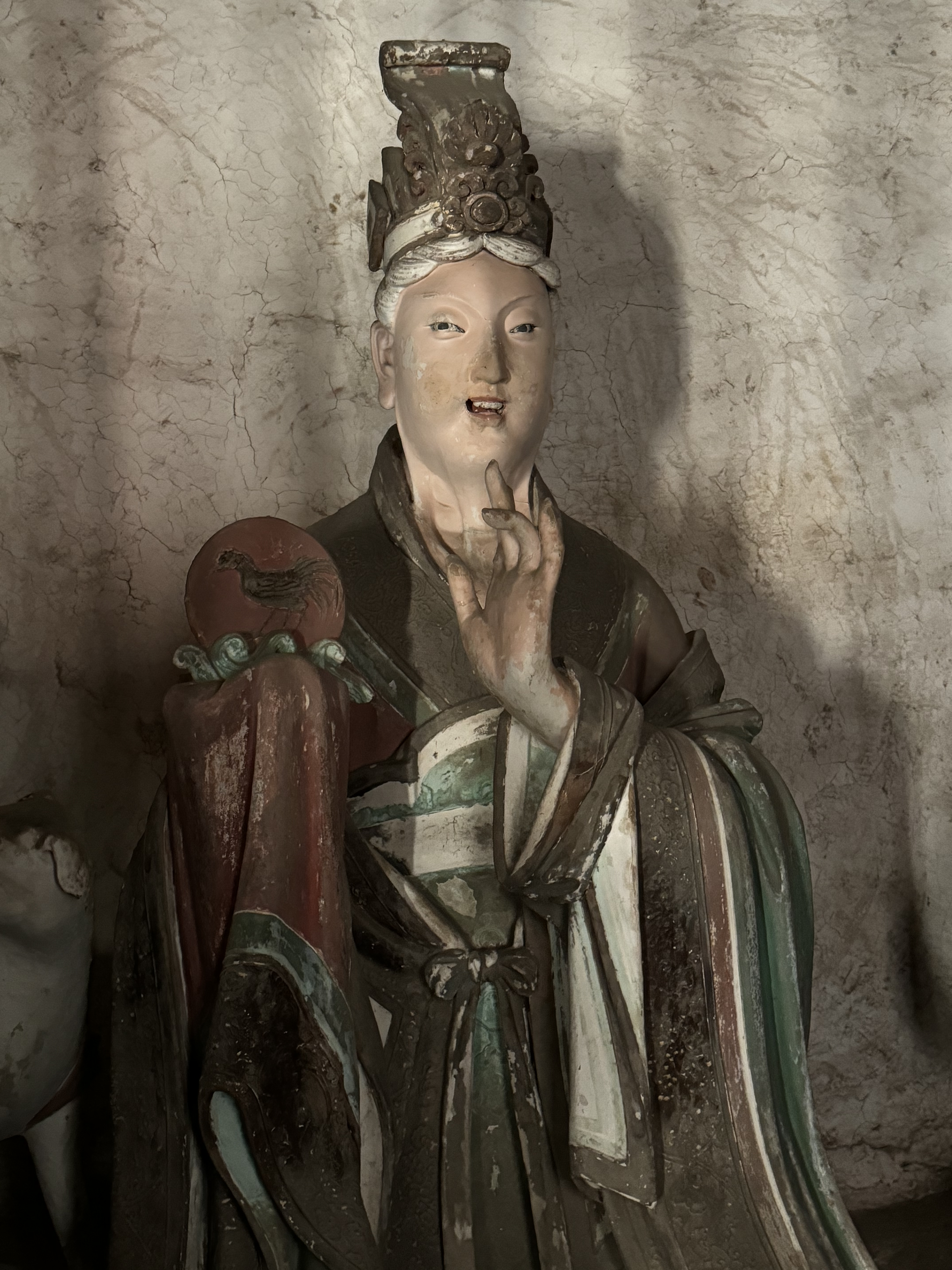
- Statue of Maori Xingguan in the Jade Emperor Temple, Fucheng
- Traditional Chinese: 昴日星官
- Simplified Chinese: 昴日星官
- Literal meaning: The Sun Rooster of Hairy Head
Transcriptions
Standard Mandarin
- Hanyu Pinyin: Mǎorì Xīngguān

Maori Xingguan (Chinese: 昴日星官; lit. 'The Sun Rooster of Hairy Head') is a deity in the traditional Chinese spiritual beliefs. Maori is considered to be one of the 28 Mansions, which are Chinese constellations. These constellations are the same as those studied in Western astrology. Maori Xingguan originated from the ancient Chinese worship of the constellations, a spiritual practice that combines Chinese mythology and astronomy. Maori Xingguan appears in Chinese mythology and literature, notably in the novels Journey to the West and Fengshen Yanyi.

== Legends ==
=== Fengshen Yanyi ===
In Fengshen Yanyi, Maori Xingguan, originally named Huang Cang, was the first giant rooster in the world. After thousands of years of cultivation, this rooster was said to have finally become immortal by spiritual processes.

He was later accepted by the heavenly master Tongtian Jiaozhu as a disciple, and became the favourite of Tongtian. In the Battle of the Ten Thousand Immortals, he was killed by Chanjiao. After his death, Jiang Ziya deified him as the Sun Rooster of Hairy Head, one of the twenty-eight stars.

=== Journey to the West ===
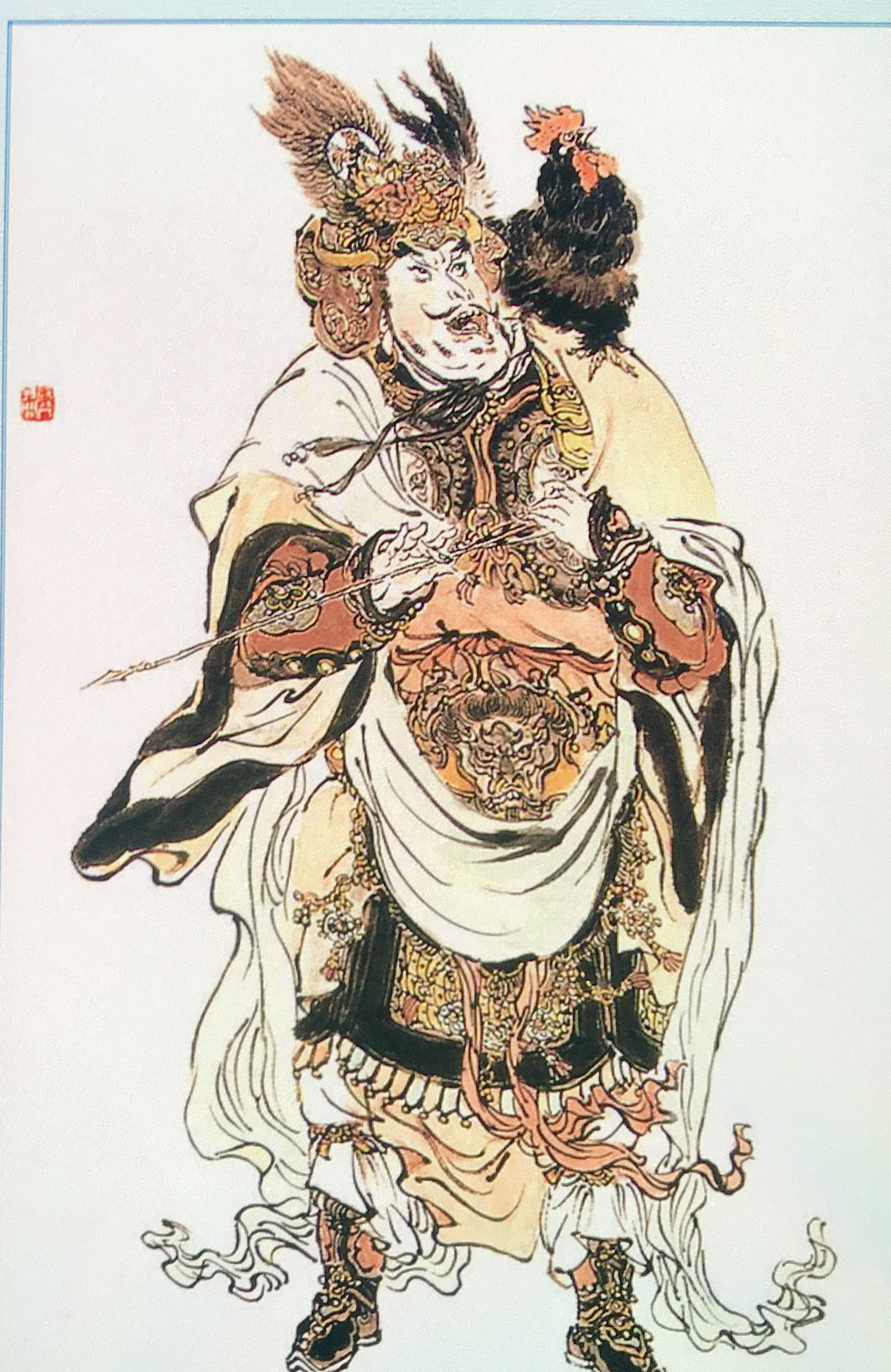
Painting of Maori Xingguan

In the classic Chinese novel Journey to the West, Maori is depicted as a star god taking the original form of a giant rooster, six or seven feet tall. He lives in the Guangming Palace (Palace of Light) located in Heaven. He is the son of the bodhisattva Pilanpo.

Tang Sanzang is captured by the powerful Scorpion Demoness and taken back to her lair, where she tries to seduce Tang Sanzang to marry her. Sun Wukong and Zhu Bajie fight with the scorpion but are held back by her poisonous sting. They return the next day. Sun Wukong tries to defeat the scorpion demoness but fails again.

Sun Wukong pleads with the bodhisattva Guanyin for additional help. Guanyin explains that in the scorpion's origin, the scorpion listened to the Buddha reciting scriptures in the Leiyin Temple (雷音寺) and stung him with the poisonous sting on her tail when he brushed her aside. The Buddha suffered from the pain of the sting and instructed his followers to bring the scorpion to him, but she had already fled.

Guanyin then recommends Sun Wukong to find Maori Xingguan for help. Sun Wukong and Maori Xingguan, together with Zhu Bajie, lead the scorpion out of the cave. The scorpion is eventually killed by Maori Xingguan, who transforms into a giant rooster with two combs. Many people say that it is because his body is a rooster, and his opponents happen to be scorpions and centipedes, he could easily defeat the scorpion demoness.
