= Juling Shen =

Gigantic river god in Chinese mythology

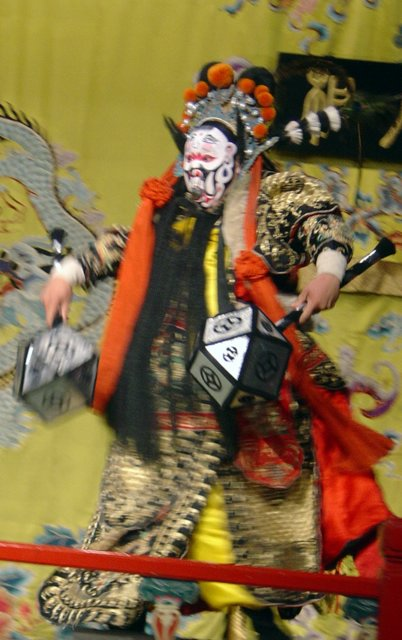
Juling Shen portrayed in the Peking opera Havoc in Heaven.

Juling Shen (simplified Chinese: 巨灵神; traditional Chinese: 巨靈神; pinyin: Jù Líng Shén; lit. 'god of giant spirit') is a gigantic river god in Chinese mythology. He is usually associated with the Yellow River.

== Splitting Mount Hua ==
It is said that Juling Shen split Mount Hua into two halves with his hands and feet so that the Yellow River could flow to the east. One half became Mount Hua; the other became Mount Shouyang (Chinese: 首陽山) in the east. Legend says imprints of his palm can still be seen on Mount Hua.

This legend appears in Zhang Heng's "Rhapsody on the Western Capital" (Chinese: 西京賦). In Commentary on the Water Classic, Li Daoyuan cites a passage from the much earlier Guoyu describing the same story. However, this quote is not found in the extant version of Guoyu. It is possible that Li was actually citing another ancient text, Ancient Tales (Chinese: 古語).

This legend is also found in Wang Wei's poem "Hua Mountain" (Chinese: 華嶽).

== In Journey to the West ==
In the Ming dynasty novel Journey to the West, Juling Shen is one of the first generals sent down by the Jade Emperor to capture the Monkey King. He is easily defeated by the latter. The commander of the heavenly army Li Jing wants to behead him for the defeat, but spares him after Nezha intervenes.

In the Peking opera Havoc in Heaven (Chinese: 鬧天宮), based on this episode, Juling Shen is very clumsy in his movements.
