= Vilambā =

Figure in Chinese Buddhism and folk religion

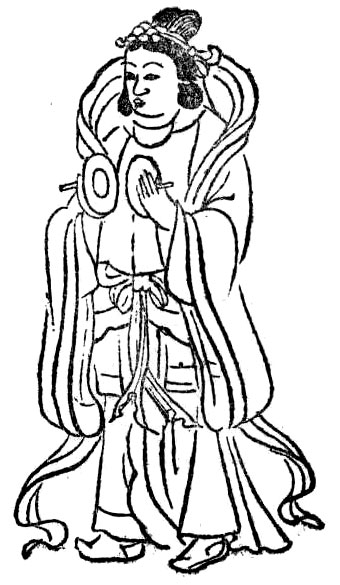
- Depiction of Vilambā from Butsuzōzui
- Sanskrit: Vilambā
- Chinese: 毗藍婆 (Pinyin: Pílánpó) 離結 (Pinyin: Líjié)
- Japanese: 毗藍婆 (romaji: Biranba) 離結 (romaji: Riketsu)
- Korean: 비람파 (RR: Birampa) 이결 (RR: Igyeol)
- Vietnamese: Tỳ lam bà Li kết

Information
- Venerated by: Mahayana Buddhism and Chinese folk religion

Vilambā (simplified Chinese: 毗兰婆; traditional Chinese: 毗藍婆; pinyin: Pílánpó) is a rākṣasī in Mahayana Buddhism and a bodhisattva in the Chinese novel Journey to the West. She is the second of the Ten Rākṣasīs named in the Lotus Sutra, where she helps protect people who follow the Buddha's teachings. In Journey to the West, she is the mother of Maori Xingguan, a rooster deity who serves in heaven.

== Origin ==
In some Buddhist interpretations, Vilambā is identified with Ākāśagarbha, the bodhisattva of space.

Other Buddhist texts give her different identities. In the Sutra of the Secret Samaya of the Lotus Samadhi (妙法蓮華三昧秘密三摩耶經), Vilambā is identified with Anantacāritra Bodhisattva (無邊行菩薩), one of the four great Bodhisattvas of the Earth. The text identifies the first four rākṣasīs with these four bodhisattvas.

The Japanese Buddhist commentary Hokkekyō Jūrin Shūyōshō (法華經鷲林拾葉鈔) identifies Vilambā with Saṃkusumitarāja Buddha (華開敷佛) and Bhaiṣajyarāja, the Medicine King Bodhisattva.

== In the Lotus Sutra ==
Vilambā appears in the Dhāraṇī chapter of the Lotus Sutra. She is named after Lambā and before Kūṭadantī. The ten rākṣasīs, together with Hārītī, her son, and their followers, come before the Buddha and promise to protect those who read, recite, and uphold the sutra. They also recite a dhāraṇī to protect its followers from harm.

In the older Chinese translation Zheng Fahua Jing (正法華經), Vilambā is called Lijie (離結; "freedom from bonds"). The Buddhist scholar Ding Fubao explained this name as freedom from the bonds of worldly desires and suffering.

== Iconography ==
Vilambā's appearance differs among Buddhist traditions. In the Fahua Shi Luocha Fa (法華十羅剎法), she looks like a dragon king, with a face as round as the full moon. She wears green clothing and has a white face. She holds wind and clouds in her right hand and prayer beads in her left. A mirror stand is placed before her.

Other images show her with a pair of cymbals. She also appears in Japanese Buddhist art, including the illustrated collection Butsuzōzui.

Vilambā and Nīlambā are among the figures carved on the Dizang Temple Sutra Pillar in Kunming, Yunnan. The pillar dates from the Dali Kingdom and stands in the Kunming City Museum. They appear beneath Vaiśravaṇa, the Heavenly King of the North, among figures identified as earth spirits.

== In Journey to the West ==
In the Ming dynasty novel Journey to the West, Vilambā is a bodhisattva who lives in Thousand Flowers Cave on Purple Cloud Mountain. She is the mother of Maori Xingguan, a rooster deity. The novel does not explain how she became a bodhisattva or the mother of Maori Xingguan.

Vilambā helps Sun Wukong defeat the Hundred-Eyed Demon Lord. The demon poisons Tang Sanzang, Zhu Bajie, and Sha Wujing with tea. Wukong fights him, but the demon releases golden light from a thousand eyes beneath his arms. Wukong escapes by turning into a pangolin and digging underground. He then meets Lishan Laomu, who tells him where to find Vilambā. She warns him not to reveal who sent him.

Wukong finds Vilambā at Thousand Flowers Cave. She tells him that she has not left her home for more than 300 years, since attending the Yulan Festival. She has kept her name hidden and asks how he found her. Wukong does not tell her about Lishan Laomu. Vilambā agrees to help him and takes an embroidery needle that can break the demon's golden light. The needle is neither steel, iron, nor gold. It was made in the solar eye of her son, Maori Xingguan.

Vilambā throws the needle into the golden light and breaks the demon's power. She then gives Wukong three pills to cure Sanzang and his disciples. When Bajie tries to kill the demon, Vilambā stops him. She takes the demon, now revealed as a large centipede, back to her cave to guard her home. Wukong jokes that Vilambā must be a hen because her son is a rooster, and chickens eat centipedes.

== Regional folklore ==
A legend from Wuxue, Hubei, tells of Vilambā and her son Maori Xingguan. Two demons, a scorpion and a centipede, lived on Yijian Mountain (一尖山). They drank the blood of people and animals and could release poisonous fire and mist. The local mountain gods reported them to the Jade Emperor, who sent Vilambā and her son to kill them. Vilambā faced the centipede demon and struck it with divine light. The demon shrank and disappeared in a cloud of black smoke. Maori Xingguan took the form of a large rooster and killed the scorpion demon with his crowing. The villagers thanked the two deities and asked them to stay. Vilambā and her son returned to heaven but left their forms on the mountain. These became two rocks called Jipo Stone (雞婆石; "Hen Stone") and Jigong Stone (雞公石; "Rooster Stone"). The rocks stand near each other on Yijian Mountain.

== Interpretations ==
In Xiyou Zhenquan (西遊真詮), the Qing dynasty Daoist commentator Chen Shibin (陳士斌) reads the Hundred-Eyed Demon Lord as a warning against false alchemy. He links the demon's poisoned tea to harmful medicines made from minerals. Vilambā represents yang energy, while the demon represents yin. Chen sees her needle as a light of wisdom that breaks the demon's golden light. He explains this as wisdom overcoming false knowledge and yang overcoming yin.

In Xiyou Yuanzhi (西遊原旨), Liu Yiming sees Vilambā as a figure of a sage's compassion. He explains that her 300 years in seclusion show that a sage helps others without caring whether people know of her. He also reads her embroidery needle as the pure heart of a child (赤子之心). Liu describes this heart as good and free from evil, which is why the needle can defeat the demon.

== Sources ==
- Nikaidō, Yoshihiro (2015). Asian Folk Religion and Cultural Interaction. Vandenhoeck & Ruprecht. ISBN 9783847004851.
- 西游记: 李卓吾批评本 (in Chinese). 岳麓书社. 2006. ISBN 9787806657287.
- 吴承恩 (2017). 西遊記（下） (in Chinese). 海乾坤文化公司.
- "毗蓝婆菩萨有多厉害？一绣花针破蜈蚣精金光，连黎山老母都忌惮她". Beijing Time. 7 July 2018.
