= Lego Monkie Kid =

Lego theme

- Subject: Monkey King and Journey to the West
- Availability: May 2020–present
- Total sets: 47 (including promotional sets)
- Characters: Monkie Kid, Mei, Tang, Pigsy, Sandy, Mo and Monkey King
- Official website

Lego Monkie Kid (Chinese: 悟空小侠) is a Lego theme inspired by the Monkey King and Journey to the West. It is licensed from The Lego Group. The theme was first introduced in May 2020. The toy line is also accompanied by an animated television series that premiered in China that same month.

== Overview ==
Lego Monkie Kid is inspired by the Monkey King and Journey to the West, which focuses on Monkie Kid and his friends, battling against a variety of demons who are trying to take over Megapolis.

== Development ==
Lego Monkie Kid is The Lego Group's first product line based on Chinese culture. Although The Lego Group had previously released Lego Chinese New Year sets, it was the first time that the company had released an entire product line based on a Chinese theme. Following research in China, The Lego Group discovered that the classic Chinese story of the Monkey King and Journey to the West is widely known within Chinese culture. As a result, the story was chosen as the main inspiration for Lego Monkie Kid. Simon Lucas, senior creative director commented, "It feels like it was in the DNA of everybody there. So we thought it was a great starting point to tell a new story that's rooted in Chinese culture". The Lego theme was developed over the course of two years and interpreted the story in a different way to the original. Lucas explained, "The people we spoke to have grown up with these stories, and we wanted to find out what's important to them, and how to interpret that in a new way...So, being 100% accurate to the original was not necessary, really, because we were picking up the key ingredients". The product line does, however, include recognizable characters from Journey to the West.

The designers behind Lego Monkie Kid revealed that researching Chinese stories and testing with children were important in the development of the theme. Lego Senior Design Manager Dennis Fong explained, "We felt that we hit something really big when we had this concept of the Monkey King ... Seeing all the energy from the kids, the parents, how they could instantly recognize it because we had a lot of key iconic elements in there. And, you know, we didn't need to tell a new story. We had the old story as a foundation for us to build upon."

The initial concept for the theme originated in a rough sketch created by Ned Rogers in December 2021. The sketch depicted several construction sets are transformed into animated vehicles and which parts of the design remain. Featured the concept art are Monkie Kid's Cloud Jet, Pigsy's Food Truck and the Tuk Tuk from Iron Bull Tank. With Lego Monkie Kid theme from The Lego Group was developed as an animated television series, the images showcase how the early set designs were taken and turned into animated models on screens.

== Launch ==
The Lego Monkie Kid theme was launched on 16 May 2020. As part of the marketing campaign, The Lego Group released the eight sets inspired by Monkey King and Journey to the West. Each set featured different giant mecha, buildings and vehicles. Minifigures including Monkie Kid, Mei, Monkey King, Mo the cat, Sandy, Mr. Tang and Pigsy were released as well. The sets were designed primarily for children 6+.

== Characters ==
=== Monkie Kids ===
- Monkie Kid ("MK"): The main protagonist of the series. A young noodle delivery boy chosen by Monkey King as his new successor to battle against the forces of evil, he wields Monkey King's golden staff and given almost all of his powers.
- Mei : The descendant of the legendary White Horse Dragon and MK's best friend, she is gifted with a dragon aura and her family's jade dragon blade to fight against foes, she would later inherit Red Son's Samadhi Fire in season 3.
- Pigsy: The stern owner and head chef of Pigsy's Noodles who acts as a fatherly figure to MK. His weapon of choice is a rake.
- Sandy: A river ogre who was formerly a rage-filled soldier, but became peaceful after going to therapy for his anger. When enraged, his eyes glow purple while his pearl necklace turns into orbs of fire. His weapon of choice is a crescent staff. He was also made into a minifigure since the Season 3 sets.
  - Mo: Sandy's pet therapy cat who is seen along with him when going on missions. He is reduced into a kitten named "Baby Mo" in later sets to follow up with Sandy becoming a minifigure.
- Tang: A regular customer at Pigsy's Noodles, often telling MK stories about Monkey King in exchange for free noodles (which angers Pigsy for being free), it is revealed in season 3 that he has the power of chi manipulation, his weapon of choice is a khakkhara. He is believed to be another reincarnation of the Golden Cicada, who previously became Tang Sanzang.
- Monkey King: The legendary hero who famously went on the Journey to the West and battled various demons, he then decided to retire on Flower Fruit Mountain and train MK as his new successor to fight against evil demons while also helping the team on occasions.

=== Demons ===
- Demon Bull King ("DBK"): Princess Iron Fan's husband and Red Son's father, he is the leader of the Demon Bull Family and the main antagonist of season 1. Demon Bull King was defeated by Monkey King centuries ago and trapped inside a mountain for 500 years until he was freed by his family and plans to take over Megapolis, his weapon is a battle axe, while also cannons and a flamethrower when transformed into a giant, he is made into a brick-built figure in "The Flaming Foundry" set.
- Princess Iron Fan: Demon Bull King's celestial wife and Red Son's mother. She was once a member of the royal Celestial Court, but later defected after falling in love with Demon Bull King and giving birth to Red Son, thus forming the Demon Bull Family who want to conquer Megapolis, the Celestial Realm and then the world. She is portrayed as cold-hearted and cruel who would do anything to please her husband, but despite that is also shown to actually care about her family. She wields a giant magic fan that can summon whirlwinds while also the power of aerokinesis.
- Red Son: Demon Bull King and Princess Iron Fan's half-demon, half-celestial son. He is an egotistical mad scientist who builds diabolical weapons and has a literal hot temper when humiliated in front of his father, whom he seeks his affection. He would occasionally join MK's team briefly to help them stop much bigger threats. It turns out he is responsible for the creation of the three Samadhi Rings due to his power being unstable when he was born. He has Pyrokinesis to conjure fire and uses a gauntlet as a weapon for both combat and to wield Monkey King's staff.
  - Bull Clones: An army of bull robots created by Red Son to serve the Demon Bull Family who are led by General Ironclad, there are also five Bull Clones that are named, Bob, Snort, Grunt, Roar, and Growl in the toy line.
- Gold and Silver Demons: Twin demon brothers Jin and Yin are a duo of troublemakers who like to create mischief. One time MK got sucked inside an enchanted Calabash by the twins which they make him believe he has a perfect life, but their influence goes awry which made the hero escape.
  - The Demon Accountant: A female demon who works for Jin and Yin as their accountant when they had owned Speedy Panda.
- Spider Queen: She is the leader of the Spider Demons and the main antagonist of season 2. She was once a powerful queen a long time ago but not before her empire was buried underground, she then rises to the surface with the help of Syntax and a little girl (possessed by Lady Bone Demon) to conquer Megapolis by spreading her venom to mind control every citizen. She is carried by a robotic spider that acts as her chariot which makes her appear to have spider legs and an abdomen. At the end of season 2, she is betrayed by Lady Bone Demon, revealing that she was the final ingredient to her plan, and is dragged into the Trigram Furnace, killing her. Her ghost is later used by the Bone Mech in season 3 against Pigsy, Sandy and Tang before it was eventually destroyed. She also appears in season 4 as one of the forms the Ink Demons take to taunt Monkey King of his past.
- Syntax: A human scientist that was turned by the Spider Queen's venom to help her conquer Megapolis, he wears goggles and has retractable robotic spider legs on his back he uses for mobility. He is the first of the spider demons to be killed by the Mayor near the end of season 2, with his ghost being used by the Bone Mech in season 3 against Pigsy, Sandy and Tang before it was eventually destroyed.
  - Spider-Bots: Robots created by Syntax to aid in the Spider Queen's takeover of Megapolis by injecting civilians with her venom to mind control them.
- Huntsman: A skilled hunter who serves the Spider Queen that is ordered to track down MK and his team, he has mechanical legs that can transform from regular legs to spider limbs. He also ends up growing a fascination with Sandy, who he becomes obsessed with fighting. He and Strong Spider are killed by the Mayor near the end of season 2, with his ghost being used by the Bone Mech in season 3 against Pigsy, Sandy and Tang before it was eventually destroyed.
- Strong Spider: A brute who acts as the brawns of the Spider Queen's army, he has a muscular build with robotic spider limbs for legs, he also doesn't appear in the toy line. He and Huntsman are killed by the Mayor near the end of season 2, with his ghost being used by the Bone Mech in season 3 against Pigsy, Sandy and Tang before it was eventually destroyed.
- Spindrax: A female biker who works for the Spider Queen, she doesn't appear in the series but was only released in the "Monkie Kid's Cloud Bike" set.
- Lady Bone Demon: A ghostly spiritual demon that was sealed within a tomb by Monkey King and the main antagonist of season 3, she believes that the mortal realm has suffered far too long and that the only way to save itself is to reshape the realms in her image as a way to end all flaws. After being freed by the Demon Bull King she took over his body and tried to destroy MK, only for the hero to defeat her and free Demon Bull King of her possession, Unbeknownst to them she roams the city and possessed a little girl. She then helped the Spider Queen rule over Megapolis but only to betray the monarch by placing her and other 4 ingredients in the Trigram Furnace to create her Bone Mech, MK tried to defeat her again but every blow just made her stronger which drained him of his powers and claim Monkey King's staff.
  - Bone Spirits: Ghostly warriors who serve Lady Bone Demon, they don't appear in the series but were only released in "The Bone Demon" set.
- Macaque (also known as the "Six-Eared Macaque"): Monkey King's doppelgänger who shares his powers and the secondary antagonist of season 3. He and Monkey King were once best friends centuries ago, but as Monkey king grew more powerful, Macaque was left behind and grew jealous to his opposite which makes him desire to steal his staff, his power and his title. After being killed by his former friend during the Journey to the West, he was resurrected by Lady Bone Demon who offers him to join her cause to destroy Monkey King, however he eventually redeems himself and help MK to defeat her, thus becoming an ally to his team. He has a scarred blind eye on the right side of his face, which he hides with magic to appear normal. He can generate a staff similar to Monkey King's except it has mace spikes at the end of each tip. Unlike his rival he possesses dark magic such as power absorption, phase through terrain, teleporting through shadows, creating copies of himself called Shadow Monkeys, and summon a gigantic smoke monster.
- The Mayor: The supposed "mayor" of Megapolis who turns out to be a former chief of war who assisted Lady Bone Demon in betraying and executing his emperor before her entrapment. It is implied that a lot of Lady Bone Demon's power has been channeled into him, possibly being the reason for his inhuman qualities such as his white eyes and his weird movements. He is betrayed and drained of his power by Lady Bone Demon and captured by a newly reformed Macaque in season 3, who forces him to tell the heroes about Lady Bone Demon's plan. He is presumably left in their custody. He appears via the Memory Scroll in season 4, showing a glimpse into Lady Bone Demon and his past serving under their emperor.
- Scorpion Queen: A scorpion demoness that can cast illusions to appear like an attractive woman, she once kidnapped Tang in an attempt to have a friend, but later persuaded to form one with Tudi. Her true form is that of a woman with both scorpion claws, legs and a stinger for a tail.
- Goldfish Demon: A small fish demon whose only source of mobility is a glass bubble with two robotic arms, he challenges MK and his team to a game where he has to give them a new engine for the T.E.A., the team kept losing their valuable items with every loss but found out he's been cheating all along thanks to MK regaining his Golden Eyes of Truth, thus winning the game, regaining their belongings and won the new engine.
- Azure Lion: A blue lion who is the leader of The Brotherhood and is the main antagonist of season 4. His goal is to free his brothers from the Scroll of Memory and rid the world of the supposed suffering from the Jade Emperor and replace him as the new ruler, however his rule almost severely damages the other realms due to his self-righteous views. He uses a bronze saber as a weapon.
  - Ink Demons: Demons made of ink who serve The Brotherhood created from the Scroll of Memory. They have the ability to shape-shift into the forms of others, which they use to take the form of those from Monkey King's troubled past in order to taunt him.
- Yellowtusk: A large white elephant with yellow tusks who is a member of The Brotherhood that uses a mallet as a weapon. Being wiser than his brothers, he sees the error of the Brotherhood's ways and know that Azure Lion's goal was only for his selfish gain to the point where he helps MK's team and turn himself over to the Celestial Army. He is designed into a big-fig within the show but made into a minifigure in the toy line.
- Peng (also known as the "Golden-Winged Peng"): A bird with golden wings who is a member of The Brotherhood that uses a Ji spear as a weapon, they are shown to care about their brothers, but cares mostly about themselves and own safety. They and their brothers have the ability to create structures in any size and can materialize their wings for flight.
- Kui Mulang (also known as the "Yellow Robed Demon"): A celestial member of the 28 Mansions who fell in love with one of the Jade Maidens, however the Celestial Realm did not accept their love to which they sacrificed their immortality in hopes of being reincarnated, but in the process lost the love of his life. Because of this he turns into a demon and consumes the souls of anyone who enters his domain to prolong his mortality. He has the ability to transform into a monstrous giant wolf.
- The Nine-Headed Demon: A demon that shapeshifts into a flying nine-headed beast. He is the main antagonist in season 5. He is a secret villain whose main mission is to explore the chaos realm. Trapped in the mortal realm for eons, his long-term plan to get back in was to wake up MK and disguise as an Underworld King.
- The 100-Eyed Demon: A centipede demon with multiple eyes who is a brief antagonist in season 5. His main power is manipulating the memories of others.

=== Allies and Celestial Beings ===
- Tang Sanzang: The Buddhist monk and reincarnation of the Golden Cicada who completed the Journey to the West with the assistance of Monkey King and his other disciples.
- Zhu Bajie: Pigsy's ancestor and one of the original Pilgrims of the Journey to the West, before joining with Tang Sanzang, he was once a demon that was much larger and obese, gathering humans as ingredients to his food and serve them to other demons to eat (including himself).
- Sha Wujing: Sandy's ancestor and one of the original Pilgrims of the Journey to the West, before joining with Tang Sanzang, he was once a rageful demon with a muscular build and has a necklace of skulls that orbit around his neck, challenging anyone who dare trespass the Flowing Sand River to see who is the strongest warrior.
- Ao Lie (also known as the "White Horse Dragon"): Mei's ancestor and one of the original Pilgrims of the Journey to the West, during a ritual of extracting the infant Red Son of the Samadhi Fire, a small fragment was transferred to him instead of one of the rings, resulting his descendant to inherit the unstable flames. He has the ability to change from his dragon, horse and human form.
- Ne Zha: The young Third Lotus Prince and member of the Celestial Court who once fought off Monkey King, but now is an ally to his successor MK and his team. He wields a spear as a weapon and is carried by two flaming rings under his feet for mobility.
- Chang'e: A celestial lunar deity who resides on the moon who enjoys livestreaming to her followers and does a cooking show that Pigsy loves to watch, she is assisted by Lunar Rabbit Robots to help her make mooncakes in her factory, she is also guarded by Bunny Mechs that protect the moon while she's away.
- Ao Guang (also known as the "Dragon of the East"): The ruler of the Eastern Sea and great-uncle of Mei who was the original owner of the golden staff before Monkey King took it as a weapon.
  - The Attendant: The royal assistant and stylist to the Dragon of the East.
- Master Subodhi: Monkey King's former martial arts mentor who taught him to how to become immortal through Taoism and give him powers such as summoning a cloud to fly, replicating himself through his fur and shapeshifting into 72 forms of transformation. When MK and his friends got sucked inside the Scroll of Memory, he meets with a memory of the wise master, however he is revealed to be all knowing as he has limited knowledge of the present despite being just a memory.
  - The Acolyte: A female disciple of Master Subodhi.
- Jade Emperor: The ruler of the Celestial Realm who has the power to control all the realms, he previously defeated Monkey King after he tried to take over the Celestial Realm and forced him to become Tang Sanzang's disciple. He was later challenged by Azure Lion to which the immortal ruler was killed, making the lion the new emperor. It is revealed that the Jade Emperor was instructed by Nüwa to protect the yellow Color Stone, which caused the entire universe to crumble due to Azure Lion's actions.
- Erlang Shen: A half-celestial with a mystical third eye often accompanied by his dog. He is also the Jade Emperor's nephew. In the TV show, he, Ne Zha, and Princess Iron Fan were sent to fight off the Brotherhood. He is in "The Heavenly Realms" set.
- Lao Tzu: A celestial alchemist who was the original owner of the Trigram Furnace, which he used to contain Monkey King for causing a ruckus in the Celestial Realm. He appears in "The Heavenly Realms" set.
- Li Jing: The pagoda-bearing celestial and father of Ne Zha. He takes over the role of the Jade Emperor after Azure Lion failed at keeping his power.
- Nüwa: The celestial goddess of creation who is responsible for overlooking the Great Cycle and is responsible for the birth of MK. She appears in her goddess form in the "Celestial Pagoda" set, and in human form (named Lady Yu) in the "Megapolis City" set working at a jade shop.
- Tudi: A small tutelary mountain deity who resides underground, a robot named "2D-GONG" appears in the "Megapolis City" set.
- Jade Maidens: Female servants who reside in the Celestial Realm to entertain the guests and garden the Peaches of Immortality.
- The Court of the Underworld: The ten tribunal rulers of the Underworld and the creators of the Scroll of Memory to punish those who committed crimes. The Nine-Headed Demon disguised as one of the kings and used the Scroll to free Azure Lion, causing the death of the Jade Emperor and almost destroying the universe.
- The Four Symbols: Four animal beings of the Chinese constellations who are the guardians of the five Color Stones (one of which previously belonged to the Jade Emperor).
  - Black Tortoise: A large black tortoise from the North who protects the blue Color Stone, she represents the element of water and the season of Winter.
  - Teal Dragon: A green dragon from the East who protects the green Color Stone, he represents the element of nature and the season of Spring.
  - Vermillion Bird: A red Phoenix-like bird from the South who protects the red Color Stone, she represents the element of fire and the season of Summer.
  - White Tiger: A armored white tiger from the West who protects the purple Color Stone, he represents the element of Earth and the season of Fall.

=== Others ===
- Mr. Dragon and Mrs. Dragon: Mei's wealthy parents who are the descendants of the Dragon of the West.
- Liu Boqin: A hunter who lives with his wife Jing and guided Tang Sanzang to meet with his disciple Monkey King, he is also accompanied by his Ghost Grandpa.
- The Store Owner: An employee of Megapolis' shoe store who first encounters Red Son and DBK who are searching for rare item's to absorb, one of which is the beelzebub shoes, he told the two to get back in line which made Demon Bull King take them by force and terrified the worker. He later appears again during the Spider Queen's takeover where he complains to Red Son (who was a cook at a food stand) about the food he made was too hot and burned his tastebuds, he demanded to see his manager who in turn was DBK and once again scares him off, he later stations himself in Lantern City.
- The Commentator: A citizen of Megapolis who announces most of the cities competitions like the Great Wall Race and Food Wars.
- The Guardians of Knowledge: Two large red and blue guards who protect "The Cloud", a place where it connects the world of all its technology and knowledge.

== Toy line ==
=== Construction sets ===
According to BrickLink, The Lego Group has released 47 playsets and promotional packs based on the Lego Monkie Kid theme.

==== A Hero is Born sets ====
In 2020, eight sets were released on 16 May 2020 and were based on the TV special titled A Hero is Born. A total of eight sets including the Monkey King Warrior Mech, Demon Bull King and Monkie Kid's Team Secret HQ were released. Senior Design Director of Lego Simon Lucas, discussed the Demon Bull King set, and explained "The Demon Bull is such an iconic demon and kept coming up in our conversation. So we wanted to include him as the main demon in this season," adding that "... we wanted to reinvent him in a brand new way, because LEGO is the perfect way to do that. So now we heard from the kids, 'That's definitely the Bull Demon, but I've never seen him like that before."' He's now half cyborg and half bull, and that's really cool." In addition, two promotional polybags, the Monkie Kid's Delivery Bike and Build Your Own Monkey King, were released. On December 31, 2021, A Hero is Born sets were retired in the Lego stores.

==== Season 1 sets ====
Three sets based on the first season were released on August 1, 2020, including the Monkie Kid's Cloud Roadster. On December 31, 2021, the first season sets were retired.

==== Season 2 sets ====
Six sets based on the second season, including the Monkie Kid's Team Dronecopter and The Legendary Flower Fruit Mountain, were released on March 1, 2021. In addition, Monkie Kid's RC Race and Mini Monkey King Warrior Mech were released as an exclusive set and a promotional polybag respectively. On December 31, 2021, the second season sets got retired in the Lego stores at the end of 2021.

Later, three sets were released on July 1, 2021. A total of three sets including The Bone Demon were released. Senior Creative Director Simon Lucas explained, "Lego designer Justin Ramsden and I really tried to make the building journey part of the play ... Like a video game, there's a battle at each level, and in the end you face the big boss." In addition, a two key chains with a key chain attached to the minifigures of Monkie Kid and Red Son. On December 31, 2021, the second season sets were retired.

==== Season 3 sets ====
Seven sets based on the third season were released on January 1, 2022. These included Monkie Kid's Staff Creations, Monkie Kid's Galactic Explorer and The City of Lanterns. The Lego Group revealed at the China International Import Expo a brand new set titled the "Monkie Kid's Galactic Explorer" where MK and his team have built a rocket to launch into space, but Macaque's shadow clones try to stop them. The Minifigures are Monkie Kid, Mei, Mr. Tang, Sandy (minifig), a Mo space robot, and two of Macaque's shadow clones named Rumble and Savage. A promotional polybag set namely Monkie Kid's Underwater Journey was released as well. The Lego Group designer Justin Ramsden discussed The City of Lanterns set and explained, "If you're lucky enough to get your hands on multiple copies of this set, then with a very small amount of rebuilding, you can actually combine them to make a much larger City! ... This [Lotus Hotel] is actually a candle to celebrate my seventh anniversary of working at The Lego Group. Cheers and hope you enjoy the set!"

Later, three sets, the Dragon of the East, Monkie Kid's Team Van and The Heavenly Realms, were released on June 1, 2022.

==== Season 4 sets ====
In November 2022, The Lego Group revealed at the China International Import Expo a brand new set titled the "Monkey King Ultra Mech", which was based on fourth season. The set was released on January 1, 2023. The set consists of 1705 pieces with 6 Lego minifigures of Monkey King, Monkie Kid, Mr Tang, Golden-Winged Eagle, Azure Lion and Yellow Tusk Elephant. In addition, four new sets including Monkie Kid's Combi Mech, Mei's Dragon Jet, Yellow Tusk Elephant and Monkie Kid's Team Hideout were revealed in December and were set to release on that date as well. A promotional polybag set titled Monkey King Marketplace was also released on that date. Monkie Kid's Combi Mech and Mei's Dragon Jet can combine, and Monkie Kid's Team Hideout and The City of Lanterns can also combine into the largest set.

In May 2023, four additional sets were revealed and were released on June 1, 2023. The sets included are Monkie Kid's Cloud Airship, Mei's Guardian Dragon, The Mighty Azure Lion and Dragon of the East Palace.

==== Fifth anniversary sets ====
In November 2023, The Lego Group revealed a brand new LEGO set titled "Megapolis City", which is based on the city originating from the LEGO Monkie Kid cartoon series. Three more sets were revealed on December 1, 2023, and these were titled "Creative Vehicles", "Monkie Kid's Mini Mech", and "Mei's Dragon Mech". All four of these sets were made for the fifth anniversary of the LEGO theme and were released on January 1, 2024.

==== Season 5 sets ====
In May 2024, four sets accompanying the fifth season of the series were revealed. These sets are titled "Monkie Kid's Team Power Truck", "Nine-Headed Beast", "Nezha's Ring of Fire Mech", and "Celestial Pagoda". The sets were released worldwide on June 1, 2024, with the United States and Canada receiving them on August 1, 2024.

=== Lego BrickHeadz sets ===
A Monkey King set was released as part of Lego BrickHeadz theme on August 1, 2020. The set consists of 175 pieces and a baseplate. The set included a Golden Staff. On December 31, 2021, the set was retired.

== Television series ==
Lego Monkie Kid
- Also known as: Monkie Kid
- Genre: Action; Adventure; Animated sitcom; Fantasy
- Created by: Simon Lucas
- Written by: Jeremy Adams (2020–2022); David Breen (2022–2024); Sarah Harper (2022–2023); Deirdre Devlin (2023–2024); Akira "Mark" Fujita (2023–2024)
- Directed by: Sarah Harper (2020–2022); Christian Barkel (2023); Eden Timm (2024); Ryan MacNeil (2024)
- Voices of: English: Jack DeSena; Sean Schemmel; Dave B. Mitchell; Stephanie Sheh; David Chen; Patrick Seitz; Gwendoline Yeo; Steve Blum; Kyle McCarley; Billy Kametz; Alejandro Saab; Victoria Grace; Kimberly Brooks; Michaela Dietz; Michael Sinterniklaas; Johnny Yong Bosch; Emi Lo; James Sie; Mandarin: Du Guangyi; Jia Qiu; Hu Qian; Li Ye; Zhou Nanfei; Zhai Wei; Lin Jing; Shen Lei; Xu Hui; Dicky Cheung (Taiwanese version)
- Countries of origin: Australia (seasons 1–4); Canada (season 5); China; Denmark; United States
- Original languages: English; Mandarin
- No. of seasons: 5
- No. of episodes: 50 (+ 4 specials)

Production
- Executive producers: Robert Fewkes; Alexia Gates-Foale; Keith Malone; Thomas Sørensen (2022–2024); Villads Spangsberg (2020–2022); Barbara Stephen; Phabey Wang (2020); Jill Wilfert; Asa Tait (2021–2024)
- Producers: Vicky Kjaer Jensen; Simon Lucas; Debbie Steer; Xiaodong Wen
- Running time: 11 minutes
- Production companies: Flying Bark Productions (seasons 1–4); WildBrain Studios (season 5); The Lego Group

Original release
- Network: Tencent Video (China); Youku (China) iQIYI (China); 9Go! (Australia); Cartoon Network (Australia); Kabillion (U.S.); HappyKids (U.S.); Peacock (U.S.)
- Release: May 30, 2020 – present

Lego Monkie Kid is an animated sitcom inspired by the Monkey King and Journey to the West and produced by Flying Bark Productions from seasons 1–4 and WildBrain Studios from season 5 to coincide with the release of the theme's Lego sets. The series premiered on TV3 in Malaysia on 13 September 2020, debuted on Channel 9 in Australia on 13 March 2021, on CITV on 9 May 2022 and Boomerang on 4 February 2023 in the United Kingdom.

=== Episodes ===
==== Series overview ====
Monkie Kid series overview
Season	Episodes		Original airdate	United States airdate
Pilot			May 30, 2020	September 9, 2021
1	10		September 12, 2020	September 9, 2021
Special	4		February 9, 2021	October 1, 2021
2	10	5	June 5, 2021	October 28, 2021
2	10	5	June 5, 2021	November 18, 2021
3	10		January 21, 2022	January 27, 2023
Special	4		June 12, 2022	March 10, 2023
4	10		January 20, 2023	March 10, 2023
Special	4		June 1, 2023	June 19, 2023
5	10		June 28, 2024	July 16, 2024

==== Season 1 (2020) ====
===== Monkie Kid: A Hero is Born (2020) =====
Monkie Kid: A Hero is Born is a 45-minute television special that premiered on RTM TV2 and TV3 in Malaysia on 13 June 2020, debuted on Mediacorp in Singapore on 27 June 2020, premiered on 9Go! in Australia on 13 March 2021, and premiered internationally on Amazon Kids+ on September 9, 2021. It also debuted on CITV in the United Kingdom on 9 May 2022.

Title	Written by	Original release date	Amazon air date	Prod. code
"Monkie Kid: A Hero is Born"	Jeremy Adams	May 30, 2020 (China); June 13, 2020 (Malaysia)	September 9, 2021 (Kids+); September 30, 2021 (Prime Video)	100
Monkey King comes to life as a young boy named MK, obsessed with the legends of old, discovers Monkey King's magical staff. After witnessing Red Son and Princess Iron Fan release the Demon Bull King from his prison under the mountain, MK accidentally grabs Monkey King's magical staff and escapes, sending him on a journey to Flower Fruit Mountain to return the staff to Monkey King. After the staff gets taken away from him, MK meets the Monkey King and is motivated to go back and take the staff back. Using his powers, he was able to defeat the Demon Bull King and save the day.

===== Episodes =====
No. overall	No. in season	Title	Written by	Original release date	Amazon air date	Prod. code
1	1	"Bad Weather"	Jeremy Adams	September 12, 2020 (China); September 13, 2020 (Malaysia)	September 9, 2021 (Kids+); September 30, 2021 (Prime Video)	101
Red Son takes over the 'Weather Station', a prestigious club that allows its members to control the weather in different parts of the city, in order to restore his father the Demon Bull King back to power. MK attempts to defeat Red Son, but has a hard time controlling his power. Monkey King limits MK's powers so that he can use them effectively until he has time to train and learn to fully control them. He comes back to defeat Red Son and clear up the weather, saving the city.
2	2	"Duplicatnation"	Jeremy Adams	September 12, 2020 (China); September 13, 2020 (Malaysia)	September 9, 2021 (Kids+); September 30, 2021 (Prime Video)	102
After Tang mentions the famed power of the Monkey King to duplicate himself, MK decides to create clones so he can stay home and play video games after he has to do so much work for his friends. He does not know how to use his powers so the clones wreak havoc, but eventually he saves his friends from the clones by attempting to vanish them.
3	3	"Coming Home"	Jeremy Adams	September 12, 2020 (China); September 19, 2020 (Malaysia)	September 9, 2021 (Kids+); September 30, 2021 (Prime Video)	103
Mei is a member of the Dragon Family and a descendant of the Dragon of the West. When Mei is asked to house-sit for her parents, MK begs to come along. Of course, General Ironclad, one of the Demon Bull King's minions, hears that the family will be gone and realizes there is an opening to infiltrate the famed Dragon Temple House and steal the legendary Dragon Blade. But Mei defends her home and claims her birthright as the wielder of the fabled sword.
4	4	"Noodles or Death"	Jeremy Adams	September 12, 2020 (China); September 19, 2020 (Malaysia)	September 9, 2021 (Kids+); September 30, 2021 (Prime Video)	104
Pigsy and Tang are taken hostage by the Spider Queen when they were looking for ingredients. Sandy, MK, Mei, and Mo take their new boat down into the sewers and free their friends.
5	5	"Calabash"	Jeremy Adams	September 12, 2020 (China); September 26, 2020 (Malaysia)	September 9, 2021 (Kids+); September 30, 2021 (Prime Video)	105
MK wakes up to a perfect life... too perfect. Evidently, he has defeated the entire Demon Bull King family, Pigsy tells him to take a break, and everyone treats him like a hero. He soon realizes everything is not as it seems, but that he is living in an illusion. He is trapped in the nefarious Calabash, an ancient magical device wielded by Jin and Yin, the Gold and Silver Demons. MK shakes off the illusion and breaks out of the Calabash.
6	6	"The Great Wall Race"	Jeremy Adams	September 12, 2020 (China); September 26, 2020 (Malaysia)	September 9, 2021 (Kids+); September 30, 2021 (Prime Video)	106
Everyone in the city is abuzz with the talk of an upcoming street race that will grant the winner "immortality". Mei and MK decide to enter the race, but a disagreement has them competing against each other. Their frustration boils over, causing them both to wreck with the Demon Bull Family taking the lead. They both work together in order to create a new race car and win, but MK finds out they were not racing for a Peach of Immortality but for a normal trophy.
7	7	"Impossible Delivery"	Jeremy Adams	September 12, 2020 (China); September 27, 2020 (Malaysia)	September 9, 2021 (Kids+); September 30, 2021 (Prime Video)	107
Pigsy challenges MK to deliver an order in an allotted time. MK goes through obstacles that challenge his focus in order to accomplish his goal. Eventually, he succeeds and arrives at his destination, delivering the order to the Monkey King.
8	8	"Skeleton Key"	Jeremy Adams	September 12, 2020 (China); September 27, 2020 (Malaysia)	September 9, 2021 (Kids+); September 30, 2021 (Prime Video)	108
Demon Bull King's family has found a mysterious power source that will allow them to reclaim their former glory. However, it is locked behind an ancient gate. The key to it, which can open any door, was given to MK as a "Thank You" for saving the city over and over. After messing around with the key, Red Son finds them. It is a game of cat and mouse as DBK's family tries to get the key, and MK and Mei attempt to keep it out of their hands. Unfortunately, MK fails and the DBK family runs away with the key. The gate is open to the surprise of a bone spirit possessing the Demon Bull King and his minions.
9	9	"Macaque"	Jeremy Adams	September 12, 2020 (China); October 3, 2020 (Malaysia)	September 9, 2021 (Kids+); September 30, 2021 (Prime Video)	109
MK, tired of Monkey King's teachings, meets a mysterious and powerful figure, titled the Six-Eared Macaque. He offers to train MK and he accepts, hoping to learn more so he can defend the city. The new teacher is actually an old enemy of the Monkey King and is trying to siphon his powers from MK in order to defeat his fabled arch-nemesis. MK finally understands what Monkey King's teachings mean and uses it to defeat Macaque.
10	10	"The End is Here!"	Jeremy Adams	September 12, 2020 (China); October 3, 2020 (Malaysia)	September 9, 2021 (Kids+); September 30, 2021 (Prime Video)	110
When MK discovers DBK has taken over the city, he must use everything he has learned to defeat him. MK teams up with Red Son and Princess Iron Fan to kick DBK back to reality as he tries hurting them as well. MK succeeds, but the bone spirit fades away and possesses a little girl.

==== Season 2 (2021) ====
===== Revenge of the Spider Queen (2021) =====
Revenge of the Spider Queen is a four-part television special that premiered on TV3 in Malaysia on 27 March 2021, premiered on 9Go! in Australia on 24 April 2021, and premiered internationally on Amazon Kids+ on October 1, 2021. It also debuted on CITV in the United Kingdom on 17 May 2022.

No. in season	Title	Written by	Original release date	Amazon air date	Prod. code
1	"Happy New Year"	Jeremy Adams	February 9, 2021 (China); March 27, 2021 (Malaysia)	October 1, 2021 (Kids+); October 1, 2022 (Prime Video)	200A
The Spider Queen teams up with a mysterious, shadowy demon to collect powerful artifacts in order to defeat MK and his legendary teacher Monkey King.
2	"Year of the Spider"	Jeremy Adams	February 9, 2021 (China); March 27, 2021 (Malaysia)	October 1, 2021 (Kids+); October 1, 2022 (Prime Video)	200B
Demon Bull King gets captured by the Spider Queen, and Red Son flies off in an airship with her venom and informs MK of what happened, revealing that he can save the city by gathering items in the Celestial Realm.
3	"Celestial Realm"	Jeremy Adams	February 9, 2021 (China); March 27, 2021 (Malaysia)	October 1, 2021 (Kids+); October 1, 2022 (Prime Video)	200C
MK and his friends arrive in the Celestial Realm. They plan a heist to find Lao Tzu's pills, the Peach of Immortality, and the Trigram Furnace. The Spider Queen's henchmen track them down, attempting to stop and capture them.
4	"Fireworks"	Jeremy Adams	February 9, 2021 (China); March 27, 2021 (Malaysia)	October 1, 2021 (Kids+); October 1, 2022 (Prime Video)	200D
MK finally creates the antidote using everything from the Celestial Realm. He and his friends spray it with the civilians with their drone. Demon Bull King and Monkey King free themselves from the Spider Queen's webs and attempt to fight back also.

===== Episodes =====
No. overall	No. in season	Title	Written by	Original release date	Amazon air date	Prod. code
11	1	"Sleep Bug"	Jeremy Adams	May 1, 2021 (Australia); June 5, 2021 (China)	October 28, 2021 (Kids+); January 1, 2023 (Prime Video)	201
After the defeat of the Spider Queen, the mysterious shadowy girl orders one of Spider Queen's henchmen to track down one of six ingredients to fulfill the Spider Queen's "destiny". He creates a new game that suddenly sweeps across the city, but instead of fun and frivolity, the game is a virus that knocks out everyone who plays it. MK, having to deal with Monkey King going on vacation, realizes he is the only one who is awake in the city. He heads over to the Cloud to get rid of the virus and wake up everybody.
12	2	"Dumpling Destruction"	Eugene Son	May 1, 2021 (Australia); June 5, 2021 (China)	October 28, 2021 (Kids+); January 1, 2023 (Prime Video)	202
MK gets a call from Monkey King, who has accidentally knocked over a "Celestial Dumpling". It is streaking toward Earth and everything will be destroyed. MK teams up with Tang to get a legendary vase from Monkey King's closet that captures the giant dumpling. Meanwhile, one of Spider Queen's henchmen sneaks over and grabs one of the ingredients, a demon-revealing mirror.
13	3	"Pig Pong Panic"	Callie C. Miller	May 8, 2021 (Australia); June 5, 2021 (China)	October 28, 2021 (Kids+); January 1, 2023 (Prime Video)	203
Pigsy accidentally replaces the Monkey Mech game at his restaurant with Ping Pong and gets wildly addicted. MK breaks Pigsy from his addiction whilst in Monkey King's training blindfold that only comes off when he listens to others. Meanwhile, MK lets out a cage filled with fruit babies who run amok and cause havoc, and Mo has to find a way to stop them.
14	4	"Sweet'n'Sour"	Greg Hahn	May 8, 2021 (Australia); June 5, 2021 (China)	October 28, 2021 (Kids+); January 1, 2023 (Prime Video)	204
Speedy Panda stores have appeared everywhere along with their biker gang delivery boys, messing MK's deliveries up and sabotaging Pigsy's restaurant. Things boil over until a "FOOD WAR" is declared between them. MK and Pigsy go in hand-to-hand combat in food preparation against the Speedy Panda owners, who happen to be Jin and Yin.
15	5	"Minor Scale"	Joelle Sellner	May 15, 2021 (Australia); June 5, 2021 (China)	October 28, 2021 (Kids+); January 1, 2023 (Prime Video)	205
MK wants to learn new powers. By "thinking little", he accidentally shrinks himself and falls down the drain, into the sewers, and finds himself back in the lair of the Spider Queen. While there, he meets the mysterious girl who reveals herself to be the Lady Bone Demon and almost tricks him into giving up his staff.
16	6	"Game On"	Shaene Siders	May 15, 2021 (Australia); June 5, 2021 (China)	November 18, 2021 (Kids+); January 1, 2023 (Prime Video)	206
MK, pressured by the Lady Bone Demon and afraid of admitting it to anyone, wants to become so powerful it would be "certain defeat". He then finds a VR video game that emulates the Monkey King's battles. MK jumps in, hoping to "live" Monkey King's life in order to be a better hero. He learns new tricks along the way, including how to counter-attack or defend himself.
17	7	"Shadow Play"	Meghan Fitzmartin	May 22, 2021 (Australia); June 5, 2021 (China)	November 18, 2021 (Kids+); January 1, 2023 (Prime Video)	207
MK and his friends attend a shadow play, secretly run by Macaque. Using a magical lantern, he imprisons his friends to toy with MK. MK suspects that the shadow play, which tells the story about a Hero and a Warrior, was actually a backstory about Monkey King and Macaque's close friendship. After the play, the Lady Bone Demon's minion the Mayor steals the lantern from him.
18	8	"To Catch a Leaf"	T.K. O'Brian	May 22, 2021 (Australia); June 5, 2021 (China)	November 18, 2021 (Kids+); January 1, 2023 (Prime Video)	208
After eating in a cursed meatball eating contest, MK has got a bad case of the hiccups that cause giant earthquakes. The only cure is a tea made from the rare Crimson Jimson weed that only Sandy can procure from a dangerous location. One of Spider Queen's henchmen, Huntsman, also joins in and tries to steal the flower back. After a rigorous battle, he managed to get a leaf of the flower.
19	9	"72 Transformations"	Alan Denton	May 29, 2021 (Australia); June 5, 2021 (China)	November 18, 2021 (Kids+); January 1, 2023 (Prime Video)	209
Spider Queen and her henchmen suspect that the Lady Bone Demon has other plans, so they attempt to rebuild the Spider mech that destroyed the city to battle against her. Meanwhile, MK has learned the power of transformation. When Spider-Bots steal Pigsy's sign, MK needs to use his new powers of transformation to get it back. MK manages to succeed after the Lady Bone Demon captures the Spider Queen and her henchmen. MK asks his friends if he wants to do more training.
20	10	"This is the End!"	Jeremy Adams	May 29, 2021 (Australia); June 5, 2021 (China)	November 18, 2021 (Kids+); January 1, 2023 (Prime Video)	210
After gathering all the secret ingredients, Lady Bone Demon creates a powerful bone mech which she uses to attack MK while he is out training with his friends. MK tells them the truth about the Lady Bone Demon. Before she could succeed and take all of MK's powers, the Monkey King returns from "vacation" and saves MK. It turns out he actually lied and left to get a map to rebuild a weapon that will defeat the Lady Bone Demon. MK and his friends team up with Monkey King on his adventure to find the weapon.

==== Season 3 (2022) ====
No. overall	No. in season	Title	Written by	Original release date	United States air date	Prod. code
21	1	"On the Run"	Jeremy Adams & Yin Kai	January 21, 2022 (China); May 25, 2022 (United Kingdom)	January 27, 2023 (Kabillion); March 10, 2023 (HappyKids)	301
MK and his friends are on the run after escaping from the Lady Bone Demon. Monkey King explains the plan with the map, stating that they need to track down three rings to rebuild a powerful weapon – The Samadhi Fire – to defeat her. However, Macaque shows up and has plans to bring them back to her.
22	2	"Great Grand Dragon of the East"	Jeremy Adams & Yin Kai	January 21, 2022 (China); May 25, 2022 (United Kingdom)	January 27, 2023 (Kabillion); March 10, 2023 (HappyKids)	302
MK and his friends sink in the ocean to the Dragon Palace of the East Sea and are imprisoned by the Dragon of the East, Mei's distant uncle. It is up to her to get the map and save her friends before Macaque catches up.
23	3	"Smartie Kid"	Jeremy Adams & Yin Kai	January 21, 2022 (China); May 26, 2022 (United Kingdom)	January 27, 2023 (Kabillion); March 10, 2023 (HappyKids)	303
The heroes drive across a vast desert and head for the first location on the map, but when their van breaks down, the team is stranded until they find an oasis owned by the crafty Goldfish Demon, who offers to let them try and win a new engine in his game show. MK regains gold vision powers and finds out after multiple attempts that the Goldfish Demon rigged the game.
24	4	"The Winning Side"	Jeremy Adams & Yin Kai	January 21, 2022 (China); May 26, 2022 (United Kingdom)	January 27, 2023 (Kabillion); March 10, 2023 (HappyKids)	304
After MK and friends take a pit stop to train, they get back on the road. However, MK notices that he, Mei, and Sandy are heading in the wrong direction. It turns out that Macaque has tricked them and is bringing MK back to Lady Bone Demon. Meanwhile, Pigsy and Tang realize that they have been separated from the others, but before they can go looking for them, they are attacked by a horrifying demon.
25	5	"Amnesia Rules"	Jeremy Adams & Yin Kai	January 21, 2022 (China); May 27, 2022 (United Kingdom)	January 27, 2023 (Kabillion); March 10, 2023 (HappyKids)	305
When a demon attacks, Tang and Pigsy know their only choice is to wake the Monkey King from his mystic meditation. He scares off the demon, but now he thinks that he is his younger self. When the demon kidnaps Tang, it is up to Pigsy and Young Monkey King to rescue their friend. Meanwhile, Tang wakes up in the castle of a beautiful queen who 'rescued him from the demon', but he is not buying it.
26	6	"The First Ring"	Jeremy Adams & Yin Kai	January 21, 2022 (China); May 27, 2022 (United Kingdom)	January 27, 2023 (Kabillion); March 10, 2023 (HappyKids)	306
MK, Mei, and Sandy find themselves stranded in the desert, but Red Son comes to save them. Bringing the trio to his family's fortress, the heroes overstay their welcome with the villainous trio as they try to find out everything they can about the creation of the Samadhi Fire. The three discover that the Samadhi Fire was created by Red Son and was separated to control his power. They also find out that the first ring is in Demon Bull King's nose, so they plan to snatch it and escape.
27	7	"Cooking with Chang'e"	Jeremy Adams & Yin Kai	January 21, 2022 (China); May 30, 2022 (United Kingdom)	January 27, 2023 (Kabillion); March 10, 2023 (HappyKids)	307
While Pigsy and the others watch his favorite cooking show, Cooking with Chang'e, MK realizes the second ring is in her kitchen on the moon. Monkey King converts the vehicle into a rocket ship to get to the moon, and he, MK and Pigsy must avoid the Bunny security mechs to get the ring.
28	8	"Benched"	Jeremy Adams & Yin Kai	January 21, 2022 (China); May 30, 2022 (United Kingdom)	January 27, 2023 (Kabillion); March 10, 2023 (HappyKids)	308
Arriving at a lantern-themed city, the heroes need to win a talent show to claim the final ring. But Tang, who has been stuck with the role of band manager, is not going to just sit around and wait for this to happen. Meanwhile, Macaque confronts Tang inside the giant lantern and has a word-to-word about his usefulness.
29	9	"The King, the Prince, and the Shadow"	Jeremy Adams & Yin Kai	January 21, 2022 (China); May 31, 2022 (United Kingdom)	January 27, 2023 (Kabillion); March 10, 2023 (HappyKids)	309
Now holding all three rings, the heroes ask the Monkey King what is next. Before he can answer, Nezha arrives. While the Monkey King holds Nezha off, MK and the heroes must get the rings to a mystic mountain where they can rekindle its fire. However, Macaque arrives supercharged with Bone Demon power and forces the team to start the ritual and take the Samadhi Fire.
30	10	"The Samadhi Fire"	Jeremy Adams & Yin Kai	January 21, 2022 (China); May 31, 2022 (United Kingdom)	January 27, 2023 (Kabillion); March 10, 2023 (HappyKids)	310
The ritual has been started, and Mei has now absorbed the Samadhi Fire. Monkey King finally tells the heroes that there is a fourth ring that was kept inside the White Dragon Horse, passing the fourth ring's power onto Mei. The team is pushed to breaking point-Macaque escapes and MK breaks Mei out of her rage, controlling the Samadhi Fire. After she flies away, Monkey King leaves the team to fight the Lady Bone Demon alone. MK and Nezha look for Monkey King while the others find Mei. However, Red Son finds her and offers her to do some training.

===== Embrace Your Destiny (2022) =====
Embrace Your Destiny is a four-part television special that premiered on CITV in the United Kingdom on 1 June 2022.

No. in season	Title	Written by	Original release date	United States air date	Prod. code
1	"This Imperfect World"	Jeremy Adams, David Breen, Sarah Harper & Yin Kai	June 1, 2022 (United Kingdom); June 12, 2022 (China)	March 10, 2023 (HappyKids); February 8, 2024 (Kabillion)	311
Red Son teaches Mei on how to control the Samadhi Fire and use it. MK and Nezha try to stop the Monkey King from confronting the Lady Bone Demon on his own. It looks as if he might actually stand a chance of defeating her, until she takes the Mayor's power and possesses the Monkey King with it.
2	"The Corrupted King"	Jeremy Adams, David Breen, Sarah Harper & Yin Kai	June 1, 2022 (United Kingdom); June 12, 2022 (China)	March 10, 2023 (HappyKids); February 8, 2024 (Kabillion)	312
After being teleported away, MK reunites with Mei and Red Son in their training spot. But before they can come up with a plan, the possessed Monkey King arrives to take Mei and the Samadhi Fire. MK and Red Son find Sandy, Tang and Pigsy, who end up in an underground library and try to formulate the plan. Macaque arrives with the weakened and depowered Mayor.
3	"Time to Be Warriors"	Jeremy Adams, David Breen, Sarah Harper & Yin Kai	June 2, 2022 (United Kingdom); June 12, 2022 (China)	March 10, 2023 (HappyKids); February 8, 2024 (Kabillion)	313
MK and other heroes formulate a plan to rescue Mei and save the world. The mayor provides new information about the Lady Bone Demon and her backstory, with all of them realizing her powers are stretching thin. Macaque tries to hold off Monkey King, while MK gets the staff and the others try to save Mei from her crystalized dome.
4	"Destiny Fulfilled"	Jeremy Adams, David Breen, Sarah Harper & Yin Kai	June 2, 2022 (United Kingdom); June 12, 2022 (China)	March 10, 2023 (HappyKids); February 8, 2024 (Kabillion)	314
MK snaps Monkey King out of the Lady Bone Demon's control and gets the staff back. She rebels by removing her hostess and trying to rip the Samadhi Fire off of Mei. Mei snaps back to reality with the help of Red Son, and all of the heroes finally finish the Lady Bone Demon using a giant mech.

==== Season 4 (2023) ====
No. overall	No. in season	Title	Written by	Original release date	United States air date	Prod. code
31	1	"Familiar Tales"	Sarah Harper	January 20, 2023 (China); August 16, 2024 (Singapore)	March 10, 2023	401
After bringing back stolen items from Jin and Yin into Monkey King's closet, MK finds a cursed ancient scroll which takes Monkey King away after he accidentally opens it.
32	2	"New Adventures"	David Breen	January 20, 2023 (China); August 16, 2024 (Singapore)	March 10, 2023	402
MK alerts his friends about the cursed scroll that he found in Monkey King's closet. Sandy finds the scroll and accidentally opens it, which leads them to be captured as well. MK and Mei are then saved by Azure Lion, one of Monkey King's sworn brothers. He explains the scroll is a prison that forces its captives to relive their memories and past misdeeds, and offers to help them save their friends. Note: This episode was dedicated to the memory of Billy Kametz, who voiced Macaque in the series.
33	3	"The Great Tang Man"	Deirdre Devlin	January 20, 2023 (China); August 23, 2024 (Singapore)	March 10, 2023	403
MK and Mei are brought inside the scroll with the help of Azure Lion, back to seventh century Chang'an. They find Mr. Tang with the body and memory of Tang Sanzang, and plan to kick him back to reality by tagging him along his journey.
34	4	"Pig-Napped!"	Akira "Mark" Fujita	January 20, 2023 (China); August 23, 2024 (Singapore)	March 10, 2023	404
Tang gets captured by Pigsy, who is trapped in the body of his ancestor Zhu Ganglie and plans to serve him as dinner for other demons. While MK and Mei try to find where he got captured, Tang tries to get Pigsy to remember who he is.
35	5	"Court of the Yellow Robed Demon"	Deirdre Devlin	January 20, 2023 (China); September 6, 2024 (Singapore)	March 10, 2023	405
The gang gets split up and scattered into different memories after the curse finds them. Mei ends up in the castle of Kui Mulang and gets captured along with her ancestor Ao Lie, and Tang goes searching around memories to find his friends again.
36	6	"Show Me the Monster"	Akira "Mark" Fujita	January 20, 2023 (China); September 6, 2024 (Singapore)	March 10, 2023	406
Pigsy fights against Sandy, who is trapped in the body of his ancestor Sha Wujing. Meanwhile, MK ends up in Master Subodhi's training temple where Monkey King learned his powers and asks for his help in finding Monkey King.
37	7	"Pitiful Creatures"	Deirdre Devlin	January 20, 2023 (China); September 13, 2024 (Singapore)	March 10, 2023	407
MK fights back against the scroll's curse after it finds him and forms into a monkey version of him. All of MK's friends, including Monkey King, find him and fight back against the curse. They succeed, only to be interrupted by Azure Lion who pulls them except for Monkey King back to reality at the Camel Ridge.
38	8	"The Brotherhood"	David Breen	January 20, 2023 (China); September 13, 2024 (Singapore)	March 10, 2023	408
Azure Lion, along with his other sworn brothers Peng and Yellowtusk, explain to MK and his friends their plan to overthrow the Jade Emperor. However, MK fights back, and Azure accidentally breaks the scroll piece that Monkey King was trapped in. The brotherhood warn them not to fight back, and MK leaves his friends after he feels he makes everything worse.
39	9	"Roast of the Monkie Kids"	Sarah Harper	January 20, 2023 (China); September 20, 2024 (Singapore)	March 10, 2023	409
Master Subodhi teleports MK's friends to his temple and trains them to fight back as the Brotherhood prepare for their raid at the Celestial Realm.
40	10	"The Jade Emperor"	Sarah Harper	January 20, 2023 (China); September 20, 2024 (Singapore)	March 10, 2023	410
Macaque teaches MK with a video game he created to teach him to make his own decisions. MK's friends join Ne Zha in fighting back against the Brotherhood, but are transported back to Flower Fruit Mountain by MK, who took back the broken scroll piece from Azure in order to find Monkey King. Azure Lion successfully slays the Jade Emperor and steals his powers.

===== The Emperor's Wrath (2023) =====
The Emperor's Wrath is a four-part television special that premiered in China on 1 June 2023, and on the HappyKids app on 19 June 2023.

No. in season	Title	Written by	Original release date	United States air date	Prod. code
1	"A Lifetime of Mistakes"	David Breen	June 1, 2023 (China); November 13, 2023 (Singapore)	June 19, 2023	411A
With the fate of the universe in the balance, the team's only hope lies in the Monkey King, the only one who stood up to the Jade Emperor before and survived. Using the broken scroll piece, that the team took from Azure Lion, Macaque and MK enter in and try to find Monkey King through the torn apart memories.
2	"The Plan Man"	David Breen	June 1, 2023 (China); November 13, 2023 (Singapore)	June 19, 2023	411B
After saving Monkey King, the team gear up and prepare for their own assault on the Celestial Realm. Azure Lion struggles to keep himself together with the Jade Emperor's power. Monkey King tries to convince MK into using all of his strength into fighting back Azure.
3	"Rip and Tear"	Sarah Harper	June 1, 2023 (China); November 13, 2023 (Singapore)	June 19, 2023	411C
The universe tears at the seams as MK and friends engage in a final standoff with the Brotherhood. MK and Monkey King fight against the Azure Lion, who has tripled in size, while Mei and Macaque fight against Peng. Meanwhile, Pigsy, Tang and Sandy try to convince Yellowtusk in trying to join their side.
4	"Better Than We Found It"	Akira "Mark" Fujita & Sarah Harper	June 1, 2023 (China); November 13, 2023 (Singapore)	June 19, 2023	411D
After MK wins the fight using his Monkey Form powers, Azure Lion's power goes completely out of control and the universe starts tearing apart. Peng leaves after seeing the damage, while the rest of the team joins together in trying to seal and contain the Jade Emperor's power before the universe is destroyed. Monkey King, MK and Azure Lion also find out that an unknown enemy let Azure Lion out of the Scroll of Memory to set off the events of the Jade Emperor's demise.

==== Season 5 (2024) ====
No. overall	No. in season	Title	Written by	Original release date	United States air date	Prod. code
41	1	"Strings That Bind"	David Breen	June 28, 2024 (China)	July 16, 2024	501
MK is tormented by visions of the past and future. Monkey King and Macaque brace for the impending storm, facing the unknown.
42	2	"Collar the King"	David Breen	June 28, 2024 (China)	July 16, 2024	502
MK, Monkey King and Macaque are called to the underworld to stand trial for their 'crimes,' confronting their past misdeeds.
43	3	"Temple of the Goddess"	Ashe Jacobson	June 28, 2024 (China)	July 16, 2024	503
On the run from the celestial realm, the heroes seek the five color stones to save the universe, with their first destination being Burning Mountain.
44	4	"The Storm Within"	Deirdre Devlin	June 28, 2024 (China)	July 16, 2024	504
Sandy demands a one-on-one training session with MK. To his dismay, Sandy's technique is not combat but meditation.
45	5	"Claim to Flame"	David Breen & Ashe Jacobson	June 28, 2024 (China)	July 16, 2024	505
The team splits up to locate the next stone. Pigsy and Tang encounter trouble, while Mei runs into a familiar face from her past.
46	6	"Festival Fugitives"	Akira "Mark" Fujita	June 28, 2024 (China)	July 16, 2024	506
The heroes are in search for the next stone at a food festival, however they instead find Ne Zha and the celestial host blocking their path.
47	7	"Into the Pagoda"	Deirdre Devlin	June 28, 2024 (China)	July 16, 2024	507
Inside Li Jing's Pagoda, a demon traps the heroes in memories, and MK is shown memories he never knew existed.
48	8	"The Cage"	Deirdre Devlin	June 28, 2024 (China)	July 16, 2024	508
It is time to save the world. However, when the secret enemy reveals himself, their trials have only just begun.
49	9	"Sacrifice"	David Breen	June 28, 2024 (China)	July 16, 2024	509
As the enemy fights the heroes, MK must confront his mentor. He knows what he must do, but Monkey King is trying to stop him.
50	10	"Harbinger"	David Breen	June 28, 2024 (China)	July 16, 2024	510
Amid the chaos beyond the world, MK encounters the goddess Nüwa and uncovers a secret so devastating it could alter everything.

== Other media ==
=== Theme park attractions ===
In November 2021, a Lego Monkie Kid themed land was announced for the upcoming launch of Legoland Shanghai Resort in 2024.

=== Publications ===
A quarterly Lego Monkie Kid limited edition magazine published by CoroCoro was launched from 2021 to accompany the toy line only available in Japan.

=== Video game ===
==== Lego Brawls ====
A crossover fighting game named Lego Brawls was developed by RED Games. Lego Brawls was released exclusively for Apple Arcade on September 19, 2019, for iOS devices, and will be available for PC and Consoles in June 2022. It includes Monkie Kid, Mei, Pigsy, Mr. Tang, Monkey King, Princess Iron Fan, Red Son, a Bull Clone, Gold and Silver Horn Demons, and the Spider Queen as playable characters.

=== Reality television ===
Lego Masters China started its first season of the regional show with a trailer showcasing an upcoming episode based on Lego Monkie Kid.

== Reception ==
Stephanie Morgan for Common Sense Media gave the animated series a three out of five star rating and commented, "This animated Lego series is fast-moving, suspenseful, and frenetic, all things that will draw young, hero-loving viewers to it. The Lego Monkie Kid episodes are short, usually around 10 minutes, but each manages a satisfying story arc and a few laughs. Unfortunately, some of those laughs come from mild violence, name-calling, or yelling. Underlying lessons are also delivered as mixed messages. For example, MK breaks something and says "part of being a hero is owning up to your mistakes," but later fails to admit what he's done. Overall, there's not a lot of bang for your parental buck here, but your child will likely be enthralled with the high-quality animation and likable cast of characters."

== Awards and nominations ==
In October 2021, Lego Monkie Kid was nominated for "Animated Series Production of the Year" by the 20th Screen Producers Australia Awards. It was also nominated for the Animation Ages 11–17 category in the 2022 Banff Rockie Awards.

In December 2022, Lego Monkie Kid director Sarah Harper was awarded for "Best Direction in Animation" by the 2022 Australian Directors’ Guild Awards.

== See also ==
- Lego Ninjago
- Lego Legends of Chima
- Lego Nexo Knights
- Lego Hidden Side
- Lego Dreamzzz
- Mixels
