= Jintong (mythology) =

Figure in Chinese mythology

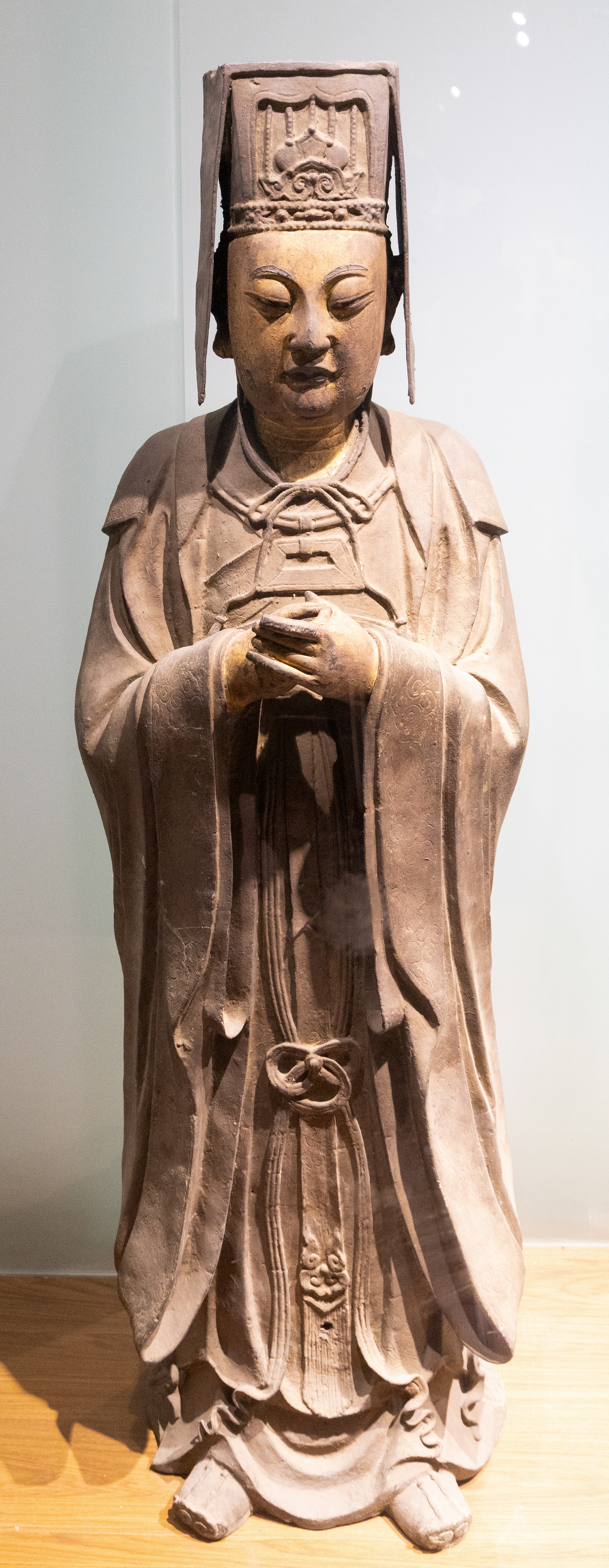
A Ming dynasty statue of Jintong, collected in Lufeng, Yunnan

Jintong (Chinese: 金童; pinyin: Jīntóng; lit. 'Golden Boy') is a male celestial attendant in Taoism and Chinese folk religion. Jintong is commonly paired with Yunü (玉女, Jade Girl). The pair appear as attendants of various deities and immortals, including the Jade Emperor and Zhenwu.

Jintong and Yunü also appear in Chinese literature, opera, religious art, and funerary practices. In these contexts, their stories and roles vary.

== Religious role ==
In Taoism, Jintong and Yunü are male and female attendants who serve gods and immortals. They appear together in Daoist scriptures and religious images. Their duties include carrying messages, serving their masters, and helping with religious ceremonies.

Jintong and Yunü also serve Zhenwu. They appear beside him in some temples, including those at Mount Wudang. They carry out ceremonial duties and keep records of good and bad deeds in the Three Realms.

== Legends ==
=== Zhang Sheng Boils the Sea ===
The Golden Boy and Jade Girl appear as characters in the Yuan dynasty zaju Zhang Sheng Boils the Sea (Zhangsheng zhu hai) by Li Haogu. At the beginning of the play, Jintong and Yunü are attendants in heaven. They develop feelings for the human world and are sent to the mortal realm. Jintong is reincarnated as Zhang Yu, a scholar from Chaozhou. Yunü is reincarnated as Qionglian, the third daughter of the Dragon King of the Eastern Sea. The two meet and marry. Donghua Xianren later reveals their previous identities, after which they return to heaven.

=== Jia Zhongming's play ===
The Golden Boy and Jade Girl also appear in Jia Zhongming's Yuan dynasty zaju Tieguai Li Converts the Golden Boy and Jade Girl (Tieguai Li du Jintong Yunü). In the play, they are sent to the human world after developing thoughts of leaving heaven. They are reincarnated as mortals and later return to the celestial realm with the help of Tieguai Li.

=== Xue Dingshan and Fan Lihua ===
In the Qing dynasty novel Xue Dingshan zhengxi, Xue Dingshan and Fan Lihua are reincarnations of Jintong and Yunü. The novel says that they were punished after damaging celestial objects and were sent to the human world. The Southern Polestar Old Man intervened on their behalf. Xue Dingshan is identified as the reincarnation of Jintong and Fan Lihua as the reincarnation of Yunü.

=== Other stories ===
In the Ming dynasty Erlang Baojuan (二郎宝卷), Yang Tianyou, a mortal scholar and the husband of Yunhua and father of Erlang Shen, is the mortal incarnation of Jintong.

The Jintong and Yunü motif appears in other Chinese literary works. In the Qing dynasty Hanyi ji, Qi Liang and Meng Jiang are described as reincarnations of Jintong and Yunü.

Some versions of the Butterfly Lovers story also identify Liang Shanbo and Zhu Yingtai as reincarnations of Jintong and Yunü. In these versions, the two are sent to the human world before being reunited.

== Buddhist tradition ==
In Chinese Buddhist art, the term Jintong is sometimes used for Sudhana (Shancai Tongzi), who is shown with Longnü (Dragon Girl) beside Guanyin. The pair are commonly known as Jintong and Yunü in later Chinese religious tradition.

Sudhana's original identity is Buddhist rather than Taoist. He is the main figure in the Gandavyuha section of the Avatamsaka Sutra.

== Funerary practices ==
In Chinese funerary art, Jintong and Yunü are shown as figures who guide the dead to the underworld. At Bukit Brown Cemetery in Singapore, statues of the pair decorate some Chinese tombs, including the tomb of businessman Ong Sam Leong (王三龙). According to Chinese tradition, they lead the deceased to the underworld.

== Cultural usage ==
The expression jintong yunü (金童玉女) is also used to describe a young man and woman who are considered a well-matched pair. The expression is used in Chinese literature and in modern Chinese.

During religious festivals and other traditional occasions, images of Jintong and Yunü may also be used as decorative or auspicious motifs.

== See also ==
- Yunü
- Sudhana
- Longnü
- Xuanwu (god)
- Jade Emperor
