= Longnü =

Follower of bodhisattva Guanyin in Chinese Buddhism

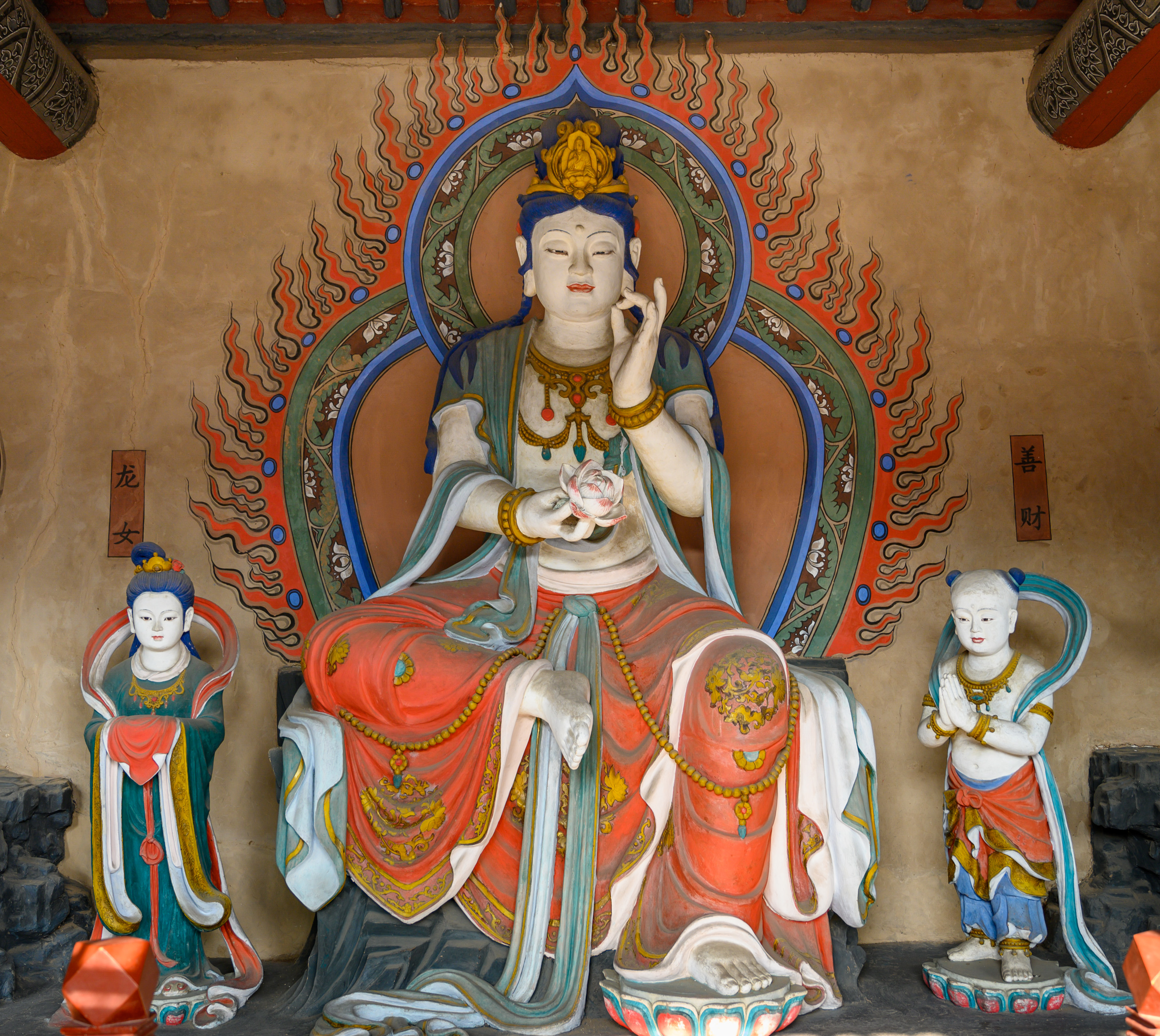
Avalokiteśvara with Longnü (left) and Sudhana (right).

Longnü (traditional Chinese: 龍女; simplified Chinese: 龙女; pinyin: Lóngnǚ; Sanskrit: nāgakanyā; Vietnamese: Long nữ), translated as Dragon Girl, along with Sudhana are considered acolytes of the bodhisattva Guanyin (Avalokiteśvara) in Chinese Buddhism. Her presence in Guanyin's iconography was influenced by tantric sutras celebrating the esoteric Amoghapāśa and Thousand-armed forms of Guanyin, which mention Longnü offering Guanyin a priceless pearl in gratitude for the latter visiting the Dragon King's palace at the bottom of the ocean to teach the inhabitants her salvific dharani.

There are no scriptural sources connecting both Sudhana and Longnü to Avalokiteśvara at the same time. It has been suggested that the acolytes are representations of the two major Mahāyāna texts, the Lotus Sūtra and the Avataṃsaka Sūtra, in which Longnü and Sudhana appear, respectively.

The depiction of Longnü and Sudhana with Avalokiteśvara may have been influenced by Yunü (Jade Maiden) and Jintong (Golden Youth) who both appear in the iconography of the Jade Emperor. She is described as being the eight-year-old daughter of the Dragon King (traditional Chinese: 龍王; simplified Chinese: 龙王; pinyin: Lóng Wáng; Sanskrit: nāgarāja) of the East Sea.

== In the Lotus Sūtra ==
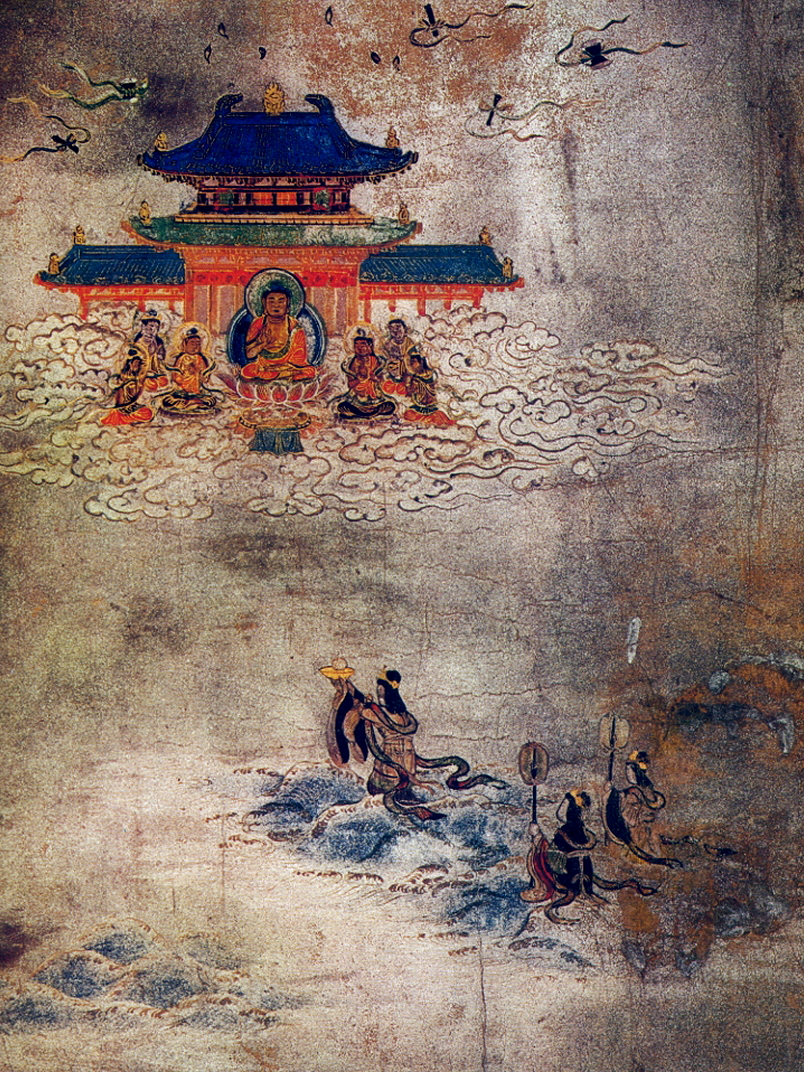
The dragon king's daughter presents her priceless jewel to the Buddha; frontispiece of a 12th-century Lotus Sutra handscroll in the "Heike Nokyo".

Longnü is depicted in the 12th Chapter of the Lotus Sūtra (Skt. Saddharma Puṇḍarīka Sūtra) as being full of wisdom and achieving instant enlightenment. In the Lotus Sūtra, Mañjuśrī Bodhisattva speaks of her, saying:

There is the daughter of the nāga king Sāgara who is only eight years old. She is wise; her faculties are sharp; and she also well knows all the faculties and deeds of sentient beings. She has attained the power of recollection. (Note: Watson and Kato leave the term dhāraṇī (Kubo: recollection) untranslated.) She preserves all the profound secret treasures of the Buddhas, enters deep in meditation, and is well capable of discerning all dharmas. She instantly produced the thought of enlightenment (Skt. bodhicitta) and has attained the stage of nonretrogression. She has unhindered eloquence and thinks of sentient beings with as much compassion as if they were her own children. Her virtues are perfect. Her thoughts and explanations are subtle and extensive, merciful, and compassionate. She has a harmonious mind and has attained enlightenment.

However, the Buddha's disciple Śāriputra, a Sravaka, does not believe that a woman can attain buddhahood. (Note: Ueki states, "Although Hinayana Buddhism denied lay believers, especially women, the ability to attain Buddhahood, the Lotus Sutra affirmed the ability of all living beings to do so, including women. This teaching seems to be the original intent motivating the creation of the Lotus Sutra.") In response, the nāga maiden offers a pearl to the Buddha, symbolizing her life and ego, and he accepts it. She then instantly transforms into a perfected male bodhisattva, and then attains complete enlightenment. According to Schuster, the Lotus Sutra's argument "is directed against the notion that some bodies (male) are fit for the highest destinies, and other bodies (female) are not."

In Chan Buddhism, the story was taken as an example to emphasize the potential of sudden awakening.

== In folk tales ==
=== Tale of the Southern Seas ===
A single chapter in the Complete Tale of Avalokiteśvara and the Southern Seas (Chinese: 南海觀音全傳; pinyin: Nánhǎi Guānyīn Quánzhuàn), a sixteenth century Ming dynasty novel is the first text that connects Longnü and Sudhana together as being acolytes of Avalokiteśvara. When the Eastern Sea Dragon King's third son was out for swim in the sea in the form of a carp, he was captured by a fisherman. Unable to transform into his dragon form due to being trapped on land, he was going to be sold and butchered at the local market. Once Avalokiteśvara learned of his predicament, she gave Shancai all her money and sent her disciple to buy him from the market and set him free. Because the carp was still alive hours after it was caught, this drew a large crowd and soon a bidding war started due to people believing that eating this fish would grant them immortality. Shancai(Red Boy) was easily outbid and begged the fish seller to spare the life of the fish, but to no avail and earning the scorn of the people at the market. It was then that Avalokiteśvara projected her voice from far away saying, "A life should definitely belong to one who tries to save it, not one who tries to take it". The crowd realizing their mistake soon dispersed and Shancai was able to bring the carp back to Avalokiteśvara and return it to the sea.

As a token of gratitude, the Dragon King asked to bring the "Pearl of Light", but his daughter volunteers to go in his father's place instead to thank Avalokiteśvara for saving her brother. After offering the pearl to Avalokiteśvara, she decides to stay with her and become her disciple to learn the Buddhist Dharma.

=== The Precious Scrolls ===
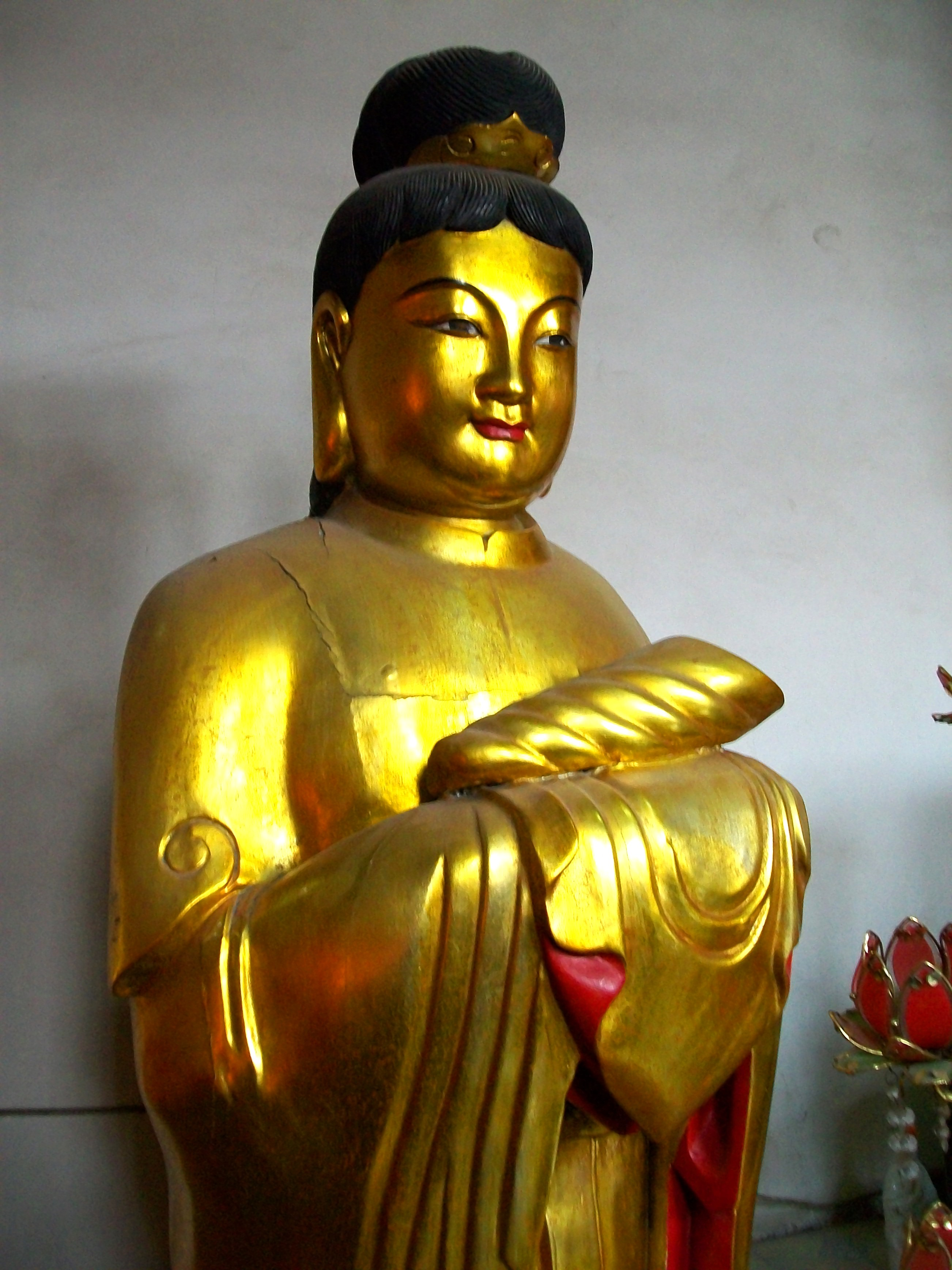
Longnü depicted as a female bodhisattva in China.

Unlike the Complete Tale of Avalokiteśvara and the Southern Seas which only briefly mentions Longnü, the Precious Scroll of Sudhana and Longnü (Chinese: 善財龍女寶撰; pinyin: Shàncái Lóngnǚ Bǎozhuàn), an eighteenth-nineteenth century scroll consisting of 29 folios, is completely devoted to the legend of Longnü and Sudhana and seems to have a Taoist origin. The text is set during the Qianfu period of the Tang dynasty. One day when Sudhana is walking down a mountain path to visit his father he hears a voice crying out for help. Upon investigation, it turns out to be the voice of a snake trapped in a bottle for the last eighteen years. The snake begs Sudhana to release her, upon which she turn into her true form, that of a monster, and threatens to eat him. When Sudhana protests at the snake's behavior, she makes the argument that than ēn (恩, a kind act) is repaid by a feud, and that is the way of the world. However, the snake agrees to submit the argument to three judges.

The first judge the argument is presented to is the human incarnation of the Golden Water Buffalo Star, who agrees with the snake, given its past experience with humans. The Buffalo Star relates how it never wanted to descend to earth but was pushed out of the gates of heaven by Kṣitigarbha who took pity on the toiling masses. Kṣitigarbha vowed that if the humans did not repay a favor with a favor, his eyes would fall out and drop to the ground. Because of the Buffalo Star's fall to earth, which was face first, it lost all of its upper front teeth. It suffered greatly at the hands of humans; after years of toiling for its master, it was butchered and eaten. Because of this, Kṣitigarbha's eyes did indeed fall out, and transformed into the snails that the buffaloes now trample on when it plows the fields.

The second judge they encounter is the Taoist priest Zhuangzi, who also agrees with the snake, citing an experience he had when he resurrected a skeleton who then immediately took Zhuangzi to court and accused him of stealing his money.

The last judge they meet is a young girl. The girl tells the snake that it can eat her as well, if the snake could show her how it was able to fit into the bottle which Sudhana had released it from. As soon as the snake worms itself back into the bottle, it is trapped. The girl then reveals herself to be Avalokiteśvara. When the snake begs for mercy, Avalokiteśvara tells it that in order to be saved, it must engage itself in religious exercises in the Grotto of the Sounds of the Flood (present day Fayu Temple) on Mount Putuo.

Three years later, Sudhana formally becomes an acolyte of Avalokiteśvara along with the Filial Parrot. After the snake has submitted itself to seven years of austerity, it cleanses itself of its poison and produces a pearl. It then transforms into Longnü and becomes an acolyte of Avalokiteśvara.

== Sources ==
- Abe, Ryuchi (2015). "Revisiting the Dragon Princess: Her Role in Medieval Engi Stories and Their Implications in Reading the Lotus Sutra". Japanese Journal of Religious Studies. 42 (1): 27–70. doi:10.18874/jjrs.42.1.2015.27-70. Archived from the original on 2015-09-07.
- Idema, Wilt L. (2008). Personal salvation and filial piety: two precious scroll narratives of Guanyin and her acolytes. University of Hawaii Press. ISBN 9780824832155.
- Kato, Bunno; Tamura, Yoshirō (1975). The Threefold Lotus Sutra: The Sutra of Innumerable Meanings; The Sutra of the Lotus Flower of the Wonderful Law; The Sutra of Meditation on the Bodhisattva Universal Virtue (PDF). Translated by Kōjirō Miyasaka. New York/Tōkyō: Weatherhill & Kōsei Publishing. Archived from the original on 2014-04-21.
- Kubo, Tsugunari (2007). The Lotus Sutra (PDF). Translated by Akira Yuyama (Revised 2nd ed.). Berkeley, California: Numata Center for Buddhist Translation and Research. ISBN 978-1-886439-39-9. Archived from the original (PDF) on 2015-05-21.
- Levering, Miriam L. (1982). "The Dragon Girl and the Abbess of Mo-Shan: Gender and Status in the Ch'an Buddhist Tradition". Journal of the International Association of Buddhist Studies. 5 (1): 19–36.
- Levering, Miriam L. (2013). "The Dragon Daughter". In Vanessa R. Sasson (ed.). Little Buddhas : Children and Childhoods in Buddhist Texts and Traditions. Oxford University Press. ISBN 9780199945610.
- Meeks, Lori Rachelle (2010). Hokkeji and the reemergence of female monastic orders in premodern Japan. Honolulu: University of Hawaii Press. ISBN 9780824833947.
- Murano, Senchu (1967). "An Outline of the Lotus Sūtra". Contemporary Religions in Japan. 8 (1): 16–84. Archived from the original on 2014-08-26.
- Peach, Lucinda Joy (2002). "Social responsibility, sex change, and salvation: Gender justice in the Lotus Sūtra". Philosophy East and West. 52: 50–74. doi:10.1353/pew.2002.0003. Archived from the original on 2014-08-29.
- Schuster, Nancy (1981). "Changing the Female Body: Wise Women and the Bodhisattva Career in Some Maharatnakutasutras". Journal of the International Association of Buddhist Studies. 4 (1): 24–69.
- Ueki, Masatoshi (2003). "The Story of the Dragon King´s Daughter". In Robin Wang (ed.). Images of women in Chinese thought and culture, writings from the pre-Qin period through the Song dynasty. Indianapolis: Hackett. ISBN 0872206521.
- The Lotus Sutra and Its Opening and Closing Chapters. Translated by Watson, Burton. Tokyo: Soka Gakkai. 2009. ISBN 978-4-412-01409-1.
