= Fan Lihua =

Chinese folk heroine

Fan Lihua (樊梨花) is a fictional folk heroine featured in Chinese folklore and historical novels, most notably in the literary cycle known as the Xue Family Generals (薛家将), The Legend of Xue Dingshan and Fan Lihua (薛丁山征西) and Romance of the Sui and Tang Dynasties (隋唐演义). She is remembered as a powerful heroine, a skilled martial artist, and a practitioner of magic who played a central role in defending and uniting the Tang dynasty's western frontier. A popular figure in operas, novels, and folk traditions, Fan Lihua is also regarded as one of the earliest examples of a strong, independent woman warrior in Chinese literary tradition. The story of her husband, Xue Dingshan, fighting alongside her on the battlefield is well-known and has had a far-reaching influence.

Fan Lihua is one of the four folk heroines of ancient China, along with Hua Mulan, Mu Guiying and Liang Hongyu. The story of her husband, Xue Dingshan, fighting alongside her on the battlefield is well-known and has had a far-reaching influence.

== Legend and record ==
The first documented account of Fan Lihua appears in Shuo Tang San Zhuan (说唐三传; Three Tales of the Tang Dynasty), a Qing dynasty pinghua (popular storytelling) text composed during the Qianlong era (1735-1796) by the pseudonymous writer Rulian Jushi.

According to the novels, Fan Lihua was born in the Western Liang State during the Tang dynasty. Her mother died when she was young, leaving her to be raised by her father, Fan Hong, and her two brothers, Han Long and Han Hu, who served as his assistants. Fan Hong was a general tasked with defending the border against the Western Turks and eventually defected to their side.

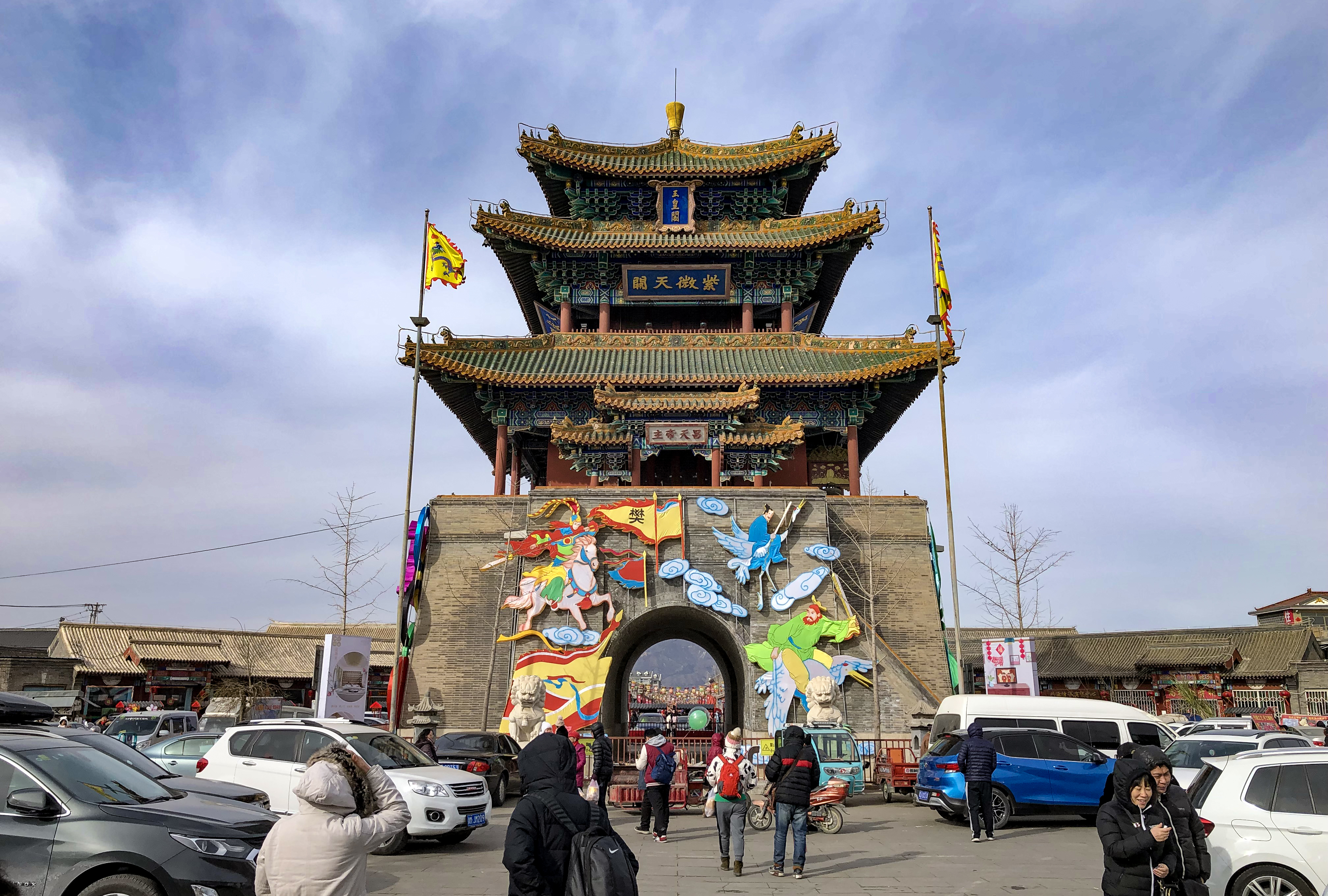
South façade of Yuhuang Pavilion, Yongning, depicting the story of Fan Lihua

Fan Lihua developed a forthright and outspoken personality. She studied martial arts for eight years under her master, Lishan Laomu, who also taught her various magical arts, including the ability to move mountains and reverse rivers (移山倒海), and the technique of transforming beans into soldiers (撒豆成兵). Lishan Laomu bestowed upon her several divine treasures from the celestial realm, such as the Zhuxian Sword (诛仙剑), the Deity-Whipping Whip (打神鞭), the Cosmic Chessboard (混天棋盘), the Cloud Talisman of Multiplication (分身云符), and the Qiankun Ring (乾坤圈). She also foretold that Fan Lihua was destined to marry a man from the Tang dynasty.

Fan Lihua descended from the mountain to assist in resisting the Tang invasion and eventually encountered Tang general Xue Dingshan, the son of the famed early Tang general Xue Rengui. The Xue family harbored disdain toward the people of Western Liang, with whom they had been at war for generations. During the campaign, Fan Lihua—proficient in both martial arts and magic—captured Xue Dingshan three times and released him each time. Although she initially defeated him with ease, she eventually fell in love with him.

Despite Fan Lihua saving his life and later defecting to support the Tang, Xue Dingshan's pride led him to reject and humiliate her repeatedly. Even after their marriage, their relationship remained strained, and he divorced her multiple times. This gave rise to the famous episode of the "Three Rejections and Three Pleas" (三休三请), in which Xue Dingshan, under pressure from his superiors and military necessity, was forced to beg Fan Lihua to return and take command. After enduring many trials, he ultimately came to recognize her worth and accepted her as his equal and wife.

As a member of the Xue family, Fan Lihua tried to persuade her father, Fan Hong, to surrender to the Tang dynasty, but he refused. A violent confrontation ensued between father and daughter, resulting in Fan Hong being accidentally killed by Fan Lihua. Upon hearing this, Fan Hong's two sons drew their swords against her, but she killed them as well. Left with no choice, Fan Lihua raised the banner of surrender to the Tang and continued to support her husband, Xue Dingshan, in the western campaigns.

After many years of fighting, the Tang Empire was victorious against Western Liang. Later in life, her son Xue Gang, under the influence of alcohol, killed the Seventh Prince of Tang, who was on tour during the Lantern Festival. Upon learning of the death of his son, Emperor Gaozong of Tang died of shock. Xue Gang was determined guilty of the crime of slaying a prince, and the entire Xue Family was sentenced to death by Wu Zetian. Xue Gang was able to escape his execution, and Fan Lihua was miraculously rescued by Lishan Laomu, who brought her to heaven.

Some folktales say that Xue Dingshan and Fan Lihua were originally the Golden Boy and Jade Girl. The Jade Emperor was furious with them for breaking celestial utensils during the Peach Banquet and sought to punish them. Fortunately, the Old Man of the South Pole interceded, but as a result, they were demoted to the mortal world. On her way down, the Jade Maiden smiled at an unattractive immortal known as Wuguixing (五鬼星; Five Ghost Star), aware that he too would descend to earth and become entangled with her fate. Meanwhile, the Golden Boy expressed disgust at her flirtatiousness. This is said to explain Xue Dingshan's dislike for Fan Lihua and their three divorces. Wuguixing was reincarnated as the Tartar general Yang Fan, who became Fan Lihua's fiancé. During the final battle, Fan Lihua killed Yang Fan. According to legend, Yang Fan's vengeful soul was reincarnated as Xue Gang, the son of Xue Dingshan and Fan Lihua. Later in life, Xue Gang killed a Tang prince, an act that ultimately led to the downfall and near destruction of the Xue family.

== Worship ==
Fan Lihua is worshipped as a deity in Chinese folk religion, where she is also known as Marshal Fan Lihua. Her statue often appears in temples dedicated to Lishan Laomu.

== In popular culture ==
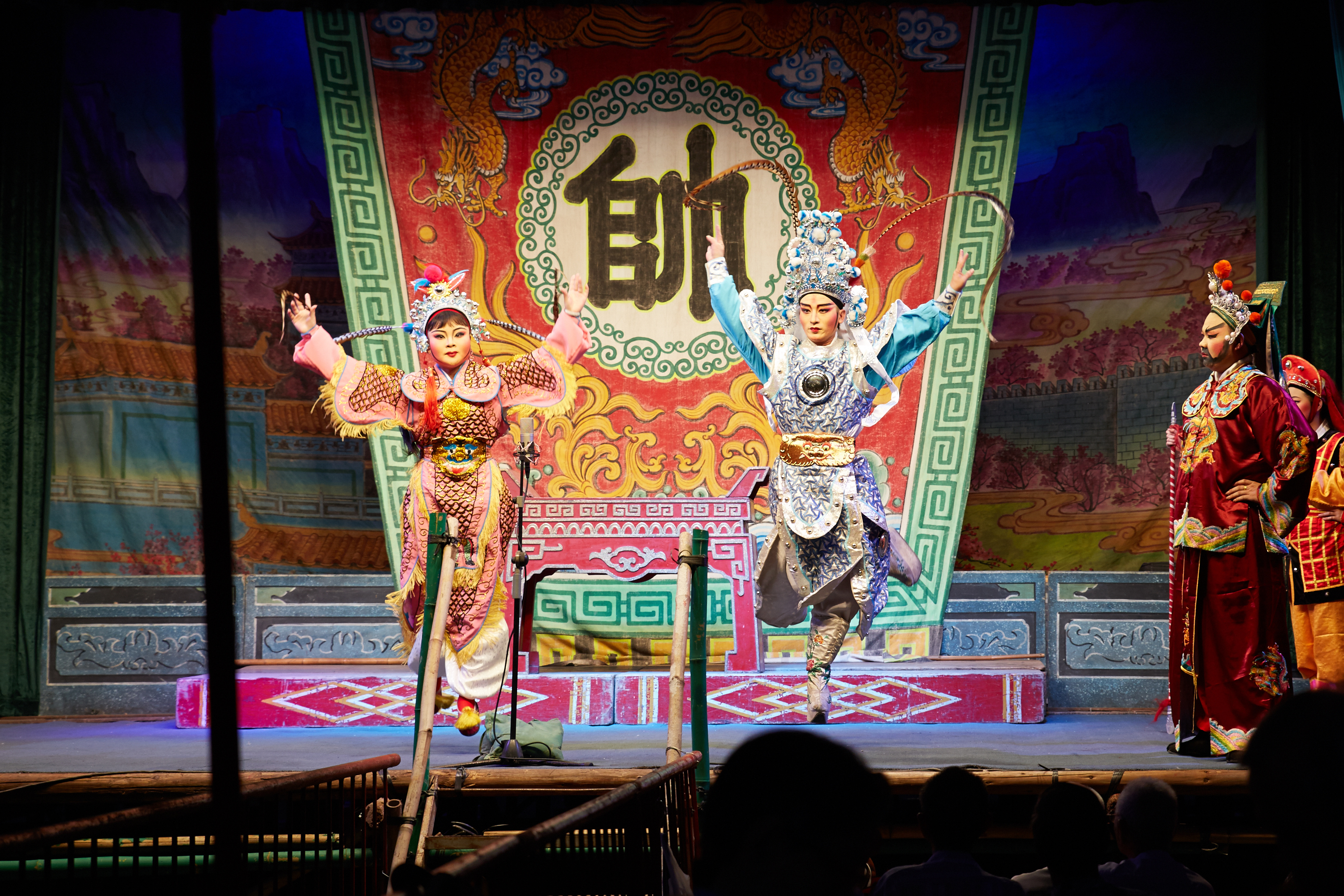
Fan Lihua and Xue Dingshan in an opera portraying the legend.

The story of Fan Lihua and her husband Xue Dingshan is often used as a subject for Chinese opera. There is a drama film named Xue Dingshan San Qi Fan Lihua based on the story of the couple.

=== Film and television ===
- Portrayed by Jessica Hsuan in the 2004 TVB series Lady Fan
- Portrayed by Qin Lan in the 2012 historical series Legend of Fan Liwa (Great Tang's Female General: Fan Lihua)
