= Xue Dingshan =

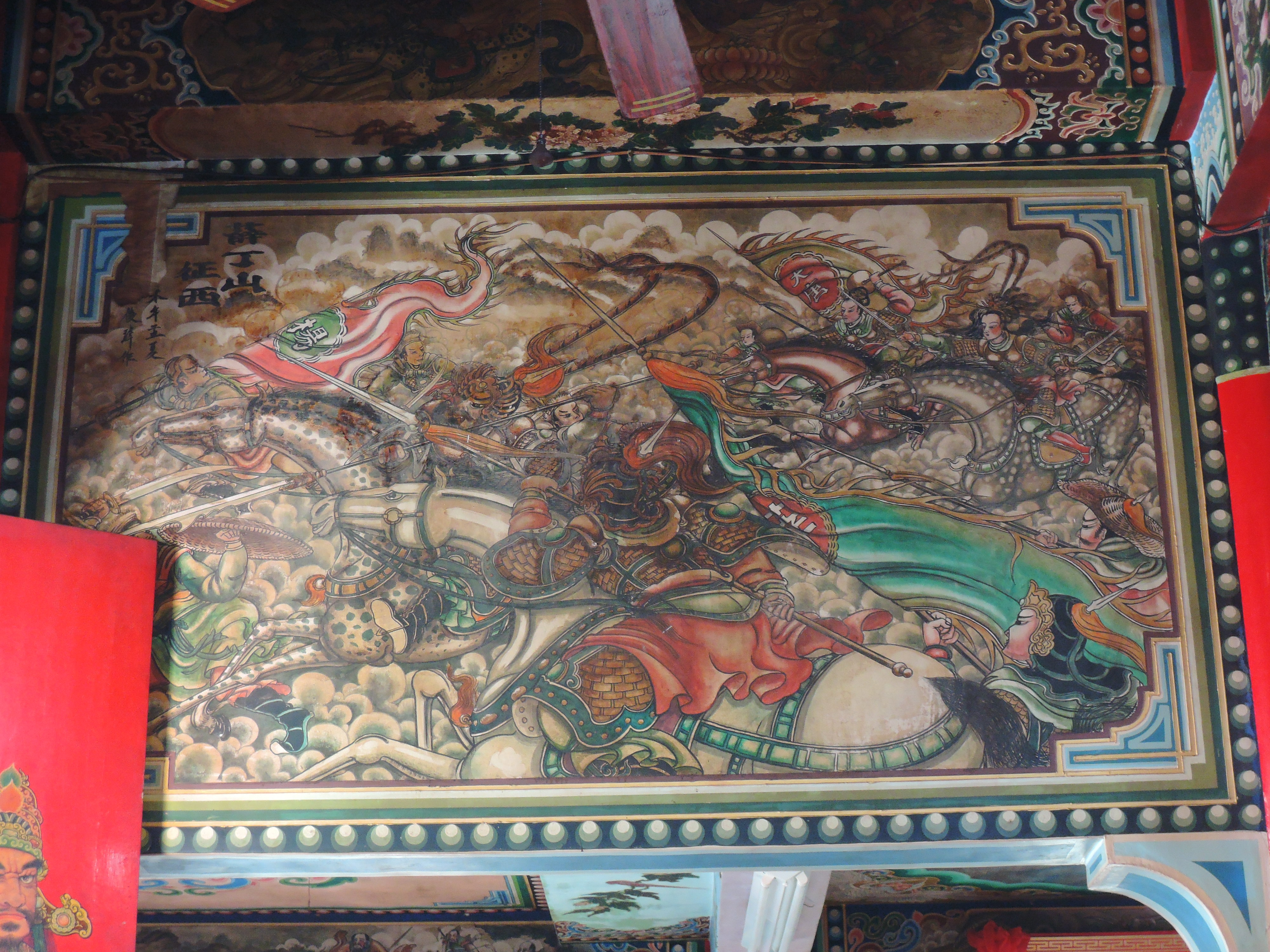
Xue Dingshan's Western Campaign (Temple mural artwork, photographed at Dong'an Temple in Caiyuan, Penghu, Taiwan)

Xue Dingshan (Chinese: 薛丁山; pinyin: Xuē Dīngshān) is a fictional Chinese general who appears in stories set during the Tang dynasty. In these stories, he is the son of Xue Rengui and the husband of Fan Lihua, a female warrior from Xiliang. His adventures are told in Chinese novels, operas, and folk tales.

== Legend and literary origins ==
Xue Dingshan appears in the Ming dynasty chuanqi play The Golden Sable (金貂記), also known as Xue Pingliao Jindiao Ji (薛平遼金貂記). It is the earliest surviving work known to feature him. The play tells how Xue Dingshan helps his father, Xue Rengui, fight against Su Baotong (蘇寶童). At the end of the play, he marries Yuchi Laning (尉遲蘭英), the daughter of Yuchi Jingde. Fan Lihua does not appear in this version of the story.

The story was later expanded in Qing dynasty novels, including Xue Dingshan's Western Expedition (薛丁山征西), also known as Shuo Tang Sanzhuan (說唐三傳). Other works gave Xue Dingshan different wives. In the Qing novel Xuejia Jiang Pingxi Yanzhuan (薛家將平西演傳), also called Huntang Houzhuan (混唐後傳), his wife is Chen Jinding (陳金定). In the play Dingtianshan (定天山), he marries a princess of Goguryeo. Fan Lihua became his wife in other Qing works. Some novels tell how Xue Dingshan divorced her three times, but this part of the story is missing from several Qing court plays.

In the later stories, Xue Dingshan is the son of Xue Rengui and his wife Liu Jinhua (柳金花). He grows up while his father is away in the army. Some versions say that his mother named him after a mountain called Dingshan near their home. When he is young, Xue Rengui accidentally shoots him while hunting wild geese. The immortal Wang Ao Laozu (王敖老祖) saves his life and takes him as a disciple. Xue Dingshan spends seven years learning martial arts and magic. He later returns home when his father is trapped at Suoyang City. He joins the Tang army and helps rescue him.

During the western campaign, Xue Dingshan marries Dou Xiantong (竇仙童) and Chen Jinding (陳金定). He later meets Fan Lihua, the daughter of Fan Hong (樊洪), the commander of Cold River Pass (寒江關). Fan Lihua is a disciple of the immortal Lishan Laomu and has learned powerful magic. She falls in love with Xue Dingshan and asks him to marry her, but he refuses. She defeats and captures him three times before he agrees. This episode is known as the "Three Captures and Three Releases" (三擒三放).

Fan Lihua tries to persuade her father and brothers to surrender to the Tang army. Her father refuses and attacks her with a sword. During the fight, he falls on her sword and dies. Her two brothers then attack her, and she kills them as well. She gives up Cold River Pass and marries Xue Dingshan. When he learns what happened to her family, he becomes angry and rejects her. Fan Lihua later helps the Tang army several times, but Xue Dingshan continues to reject her. Their troubled marriage becomes known as the "Three Divorces and Three Pleas" (三休三請). They eventually reconcile.

Xue Dingshan also accidentally kills his father during the campaign. At White Tiger Pass (白虎關), he mistakes a white tiger for a dangerous animal and shoots it with an arrow. The tiger is actually Xue Rengui, who is said to be the reincarnation of the White Tiger Star (白虎星). Wang Ao Laozu later explains that this is repayment for the time Xue Rengui accidentally shot his son. Xue Dingshan is punished for his father's death, and Fan Lihua takes command of the Tang army.

After the western campaign, Xue Dingshan and his family receive titles from Emperor Gaozong of Tang. Xue Dingshan becomes the King of the Two Liaos (兩遼王). Dou Xiantong receives the title Lady Dingguo (定國夫人), and Chen Jinding becomes Lady Baoguo (保國夫人). Fan Lihua is made Marquis Weining (威寧侯) for her military achievements. The family then returns to Chang'an.

In the later story Xue Gang Rebels Against the Tang (薛剛反唐), Xue Dingshan's son Xue Gang causes trouble during the Lantern Festival. While drunk, he kicks an imperial prince to death. Emperor Gaozong falls from a tower in the confusion and later dies. Wu Zetian orders the arrest and execution of the Xue family, but Xue Gang escapes. He later fights against her rule.

The novels also give Xue Dingshan and Fan Lihua a previous life in heaven. Xue Dingshan was the Golden Boy, and Fan Lihua was the Jade Girl. They served the Jade Emperor but broke precious objects while playing at the Peach Banquet. The Jade Emperor became angry, and the Old Man of the South Pole asked him to spare them. They were sent to the human world to become husband and wife. Before leaving heaven, the Jade Girl smiled at an ugly spirit called Wuguixing (五鬼星). The Golden Boy became jealous and angry with her. This is said to be the reason Xue Dingshan repeatedly rejects Fan Lihua.

Wuguixing is reborn as Yang Fan (楊藩), a general who had been promised Fan Lihua's hand in marriage. She later kills him in battle. His spirit is then reborn as Xue Gang, the son of Xue Dingshan and Fan Lihua. In the story, Xue Gang's actions lead to the downfall of the family as revenge for Yang Fan's death in his previous life.

Xue Dingshan is not recorded as a son of Xue Rengui in the official Tang histories. His story is often linked to Xue Ne (薛訥), a real Tang general and son of Xue Rengui. Other members of the historical Xue family also served as military officers, but the adventures of Xue Dingshan belong to later fiction.

Mao Zedong also discussed the story after watching the Xiang opera Da Yan Hui Yao (打雁回窑). According to an account by Li Jianming, Mao saw the play in March 1960 and later spoke with its performers. He questioned the scene in which Xue Rengui accidentally shoots his son and suggested changing it.

== In popular culture ==
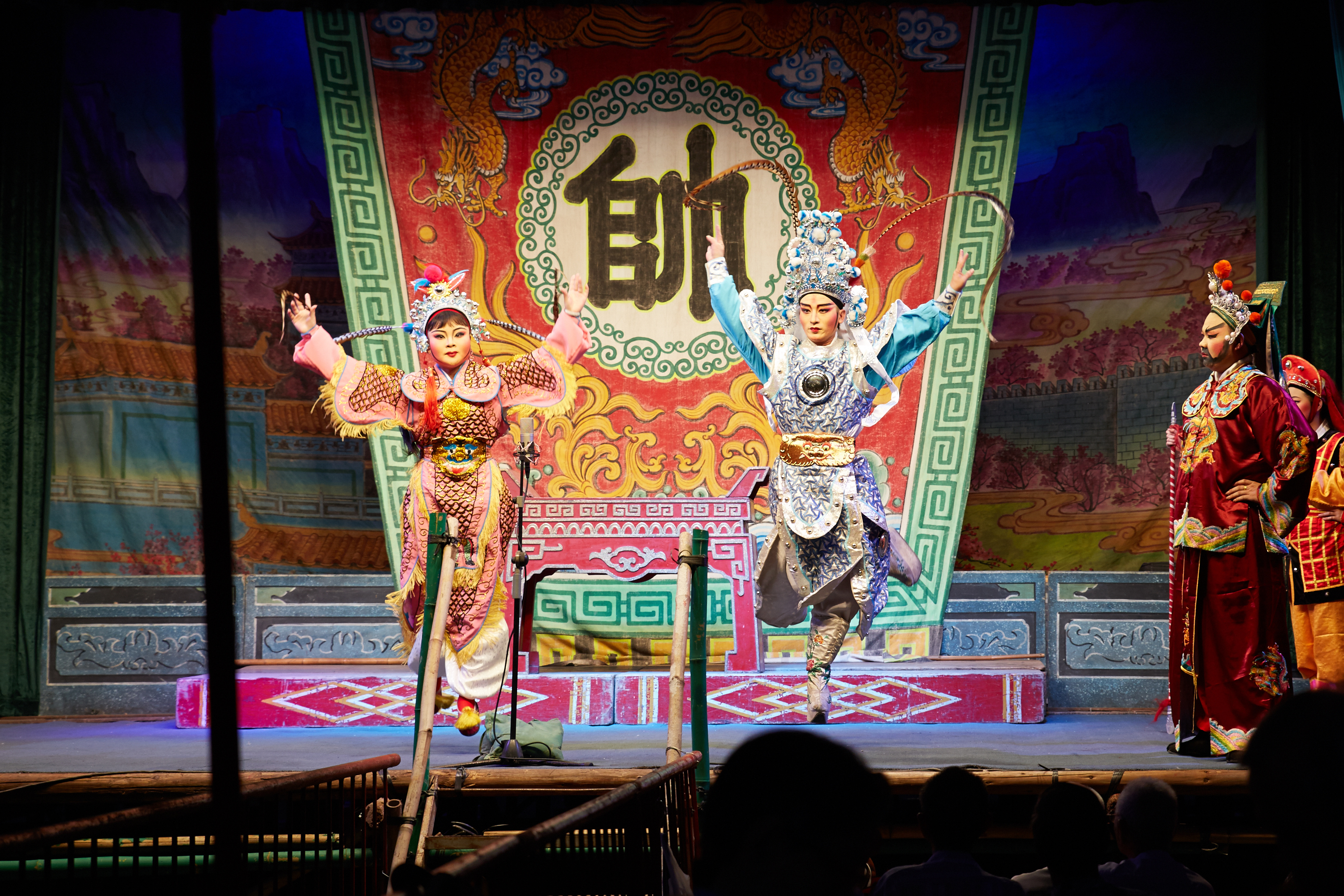
Fan Lihua and Xue Dingshan in a Chinese opera.

The stories of Xue Dingshan and Fan Lihua have been performed in Peking opera, Yue opera, and other regional forms of Chinese opera. Several plays tell the story of Xue Dingshan's marriage to Fan Lihua, including Three Pleas to Fan Lihua (三請樊梨花). In 1953, the Feiming Yue Opera Troupe performed Xue Dingshan and Fan Lihua (薛丁山與樊梨花) in Suzhou, with Lu Jinjuan in the leading role. The story has also been performed in Taiwanese opera and Cantonese opera.

Xue Dingshan has also appeared in several television dramas. Felix Wong played him in the 1986 Hong Kong television series Xue Dingshan Campaigns to the West. He was later played by Chi Shuai in Xue Dingshan (2013) and by Ye Zuxin in Heroes of Sui and Tang Dynasties 4 (2014).

A grey plaster relief called Xue Dingshan's Third Visit to the Fan Family Village (薛丁山三探樊家莊) decorates the east gate tower of Wanfutai (萬福台) at the Foshan Ancestral Temple in Guangdong. It was made by Bu Jinting (布錦庭) in the early Republican period. The relief measures 4.1 metres long and 2.3 metres wide. It shows several figures in a scene from the story, with the characters arranged in layers.

Xue Dingshan and Fan Lihua also appear in traditional Taiwanese art. The National Center for Traditional Arts in Taiwan holds painted ceramic figures of the couple dressed as characters from Beiguan opera. Other works in its collections show scenes from their courtship and battles.

The story also reached Korea and Thailand. In Korea, part of Xue Dingshan's Western Expedition was translated into Korean and published in 1929 under the title Seol Jeongsan Silgi (薛丁山實記). This version covers Chapters 23 to 44 of the Chinese novel and focuses on Fan Lihua's skills as a warrior and her marriage to Xue Dingshan.

In Thailand, Xue Dingshan's Western Expedition was among the Chinese novels translated into Thai during the reign of King Chulalongkorn (Rama V, 1868–1910). Chinese historical novels were translated into Thai throughout the nineteenth century, first circulating in handwritten copies and later in print.

== Temples and local worship ==
Local traditions about Xue Dingshan are found in Shaanxi and Shanxi. In Huanglong County, Shaanxi, a local legend says that he died after returning from his western campaign and was buried near Jujia Valley (聚家溝). Villagers later built a temple called Jiangjun Miao (將軍廟) in his memory.

At the Xue Rengui memorial site in Hejin, Shanxi, there is a hall called Xue Dingshan Hall (薛丁山殿). It contains statues of Xue Dingshan, Fan Lihua, and their sons, including Xue Gang.

In Taiwan, Xue Dingshan is worshipped at Ping'an Temple (平案宮) in Daxi District, Taoyuan. The temple is mainly dedicated to Li Shimin but also has statues of Xue Dingshan, his wife Fan Lihua, and his father Xue Rengui. A statue of his son Xue Gang is kept in a side hall.
