= Sudhana =

Deity in Chinese Buddhism

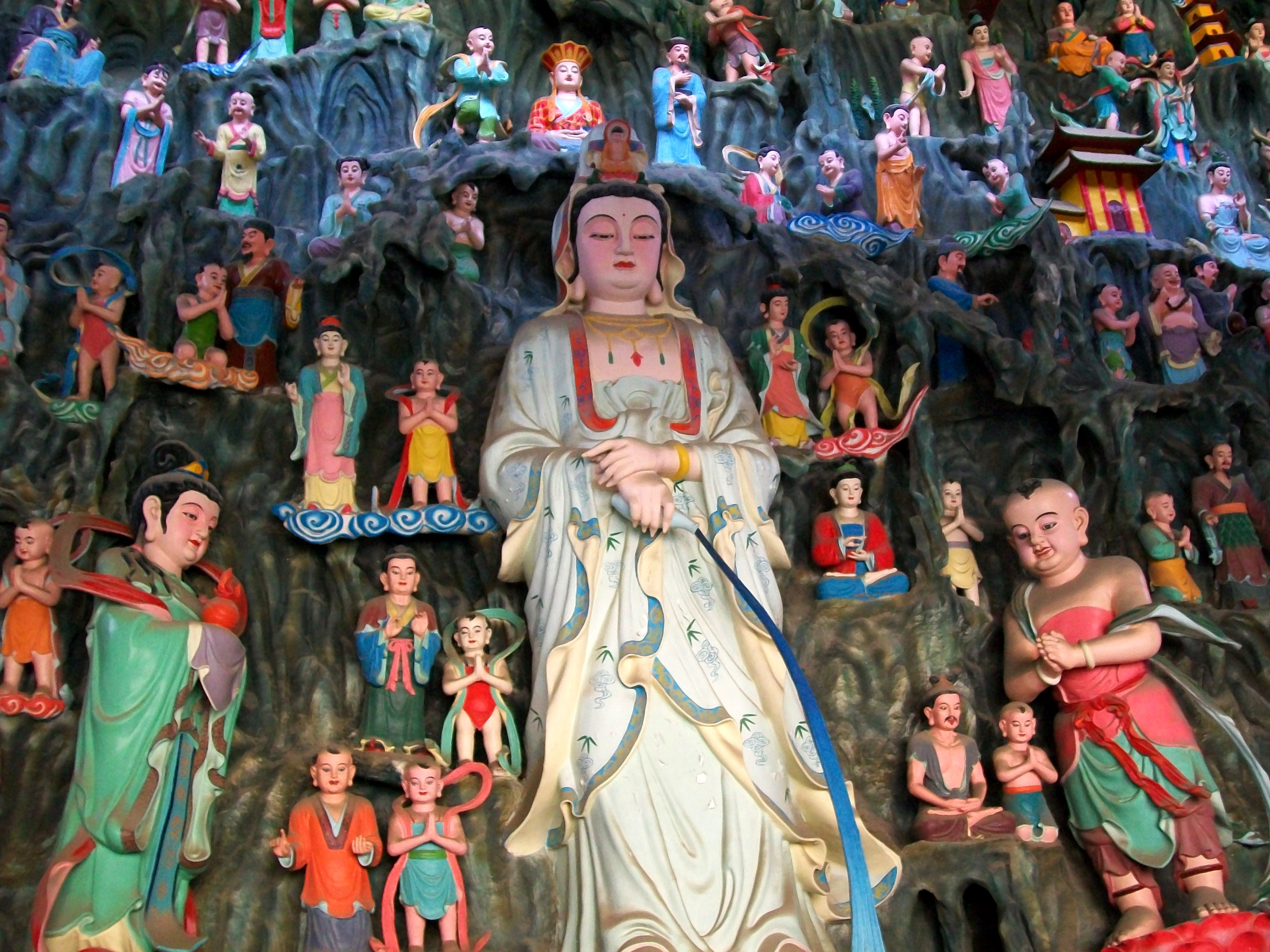
Avalokiteśvara with Longnü (left) and Sudhana (right).

Sudhanakumāra (traditional Chinese: 善財童子; simplified Chinese: 善财童子; pinyin: Shàncáitóngzǐ; Wade–Giles: Shan^{4}-ts'ai^{2} T'ung^{2}-tsŭ^{3}), mainly known as Sudhana and Shancai or Shancai Tongzi in Chinese, and translated as Child of Wealth, along with Longnü "Dragon Girl" are considered acolytes of the bodhisattva Guanyin (Avalokiteśvara) in Chinese Buddhism. He and Longnü being depicted with Guanyin was most likely influenced by Yunü (Jade Maiden) and Jintong (Golden Youth) who both appear in the iconography of the Jade Emperor.

A fictionalised account of Sudhana is detailed in the classical novel Journey to the West, where Sudhana is portrayed as a villain, Red Boy, who is eventually subdued by Guanyin and becomes the bodhisattva's attendant.

== Gandavyuha Sutra ==
Sudhana was a youth from India who was seeking bodhi (enlightenment). At the behest of the bodhisattva Mañjuśrī, Sudhana takes a pilgrimage on his quest for enlightenment and studies under 53 "good friends", those who direct one towards the Way to Enlightenment. The 53 Stations of the Tōkaidō are a metaphor for Sudhana's journey. Avalokiteśvara is the 28th spiritual master Sudhana visits at Mount Potalaka. Sudhana's quest reaches it climax at when he meets Maitreya, the Future Buddha, who snaps his fingers, thereby opening the doors to his marvelous tower. Within the tower, Sudhana experiences all the dharmadhatus (dimensions or worlds) in a fantastic succession of visions. The final master he visits is Samantabhadra, who teaches Sudhana that wisdom only exists for the sake of putting it into practice.

The pilgrimage of Sudhana mirrors that of Gautama Buddha and the Gandavyuha sutra becomes very popular in China during the Song dynasty when it was adapted and circulated in small amply illustrated booklets, each page dedicated to one of Sudhana's spiritual teachers.

== Tale of the Southern Seas ==
Chapter 18 of the Complete Tale of Guanyin and the Southern Seas (traditional Chinese: 南海觀音全撰; simplified Chinese: 南海观音全撰; pinyin: Nánhǎi Guānyīn Quánzhuàn), a 16th-century Ming dynasty novel, is the first text that established a connection between Shancai and Guanyin. In the tale, Shancai was a disabled boy from India who was very interested in studying the Buddha's teachings. At that time, Guanyin had just achieved enlightenment and had retired to Mount Putuo, an island in the South China Sea. When Shancai heard that there was a bodhisattva on Mount Putuo, he quickly journeyed there to learn from her despite his disability.

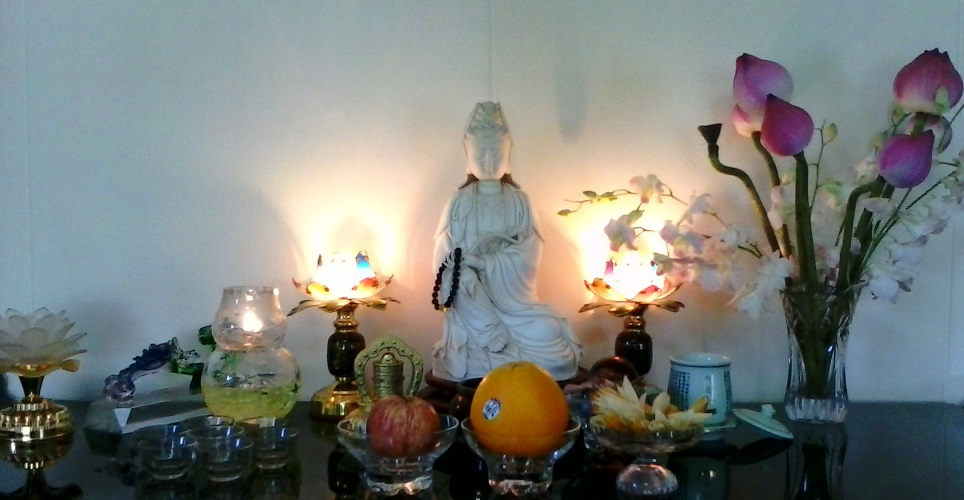
An altar for Guanyin worship.

Guanyin, after having a discussion with Shancai, decided to test his resolve to fully study the Buddhist Dharma. She transformed the trees and plants into sword-wielding pirates, who ran up the hill to attack them. Guanyin took off and dashed to the edge of a cliff and jumped off, with the pirates still in pursuit. Shancai, in his desperation to save Guanyin, jumped off after her.

Shancai and Guanyin managed to reascend the cliff, and at this point, Guanyin asked Shancai to look down. Shancai saw his mortal remains at the foot of the cliff. Guanyin then asked him to walk and Shancai found that he could walk normally and that he was no longer crippled. When he looked into a pool of water, he also discovered that he now had a handsome face. From that day onwards, Guanyin taught Shancai the entire Buddhist dharma. Guanyin and Shancai later encountered the third daughter of the Dragon King, and in the process, Guanyin earned Longnü as a new acolyte.

== Precious Scrolls of Shancai and Longnü ==
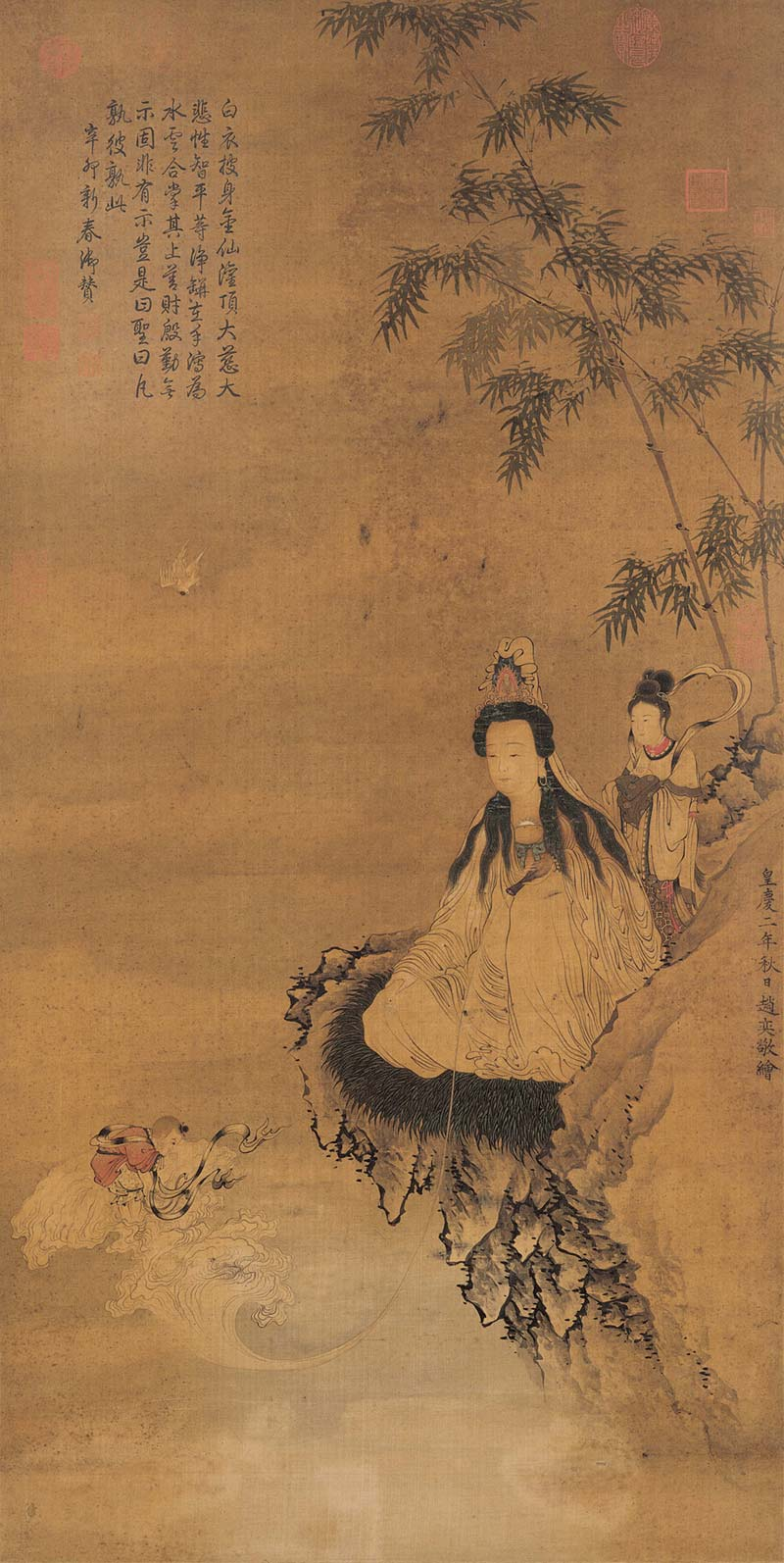
A Yuan Dynasty hanging scroll depicting Shancai (walking on waves), the Filial Parrot (above), Guanyin and Longnü.

The Precious Scroll of Shancai and Longnü (traditional Chinese: 善財龍女寶撰; simplified Chinese: 善财龙女宝撰; pinyin: Shàncái Lóngnǚ Bǎozhuàn), an 18th or 19th century scroll comprising 29 folios, provides a different account on how Shancai and Longnü became the acolytes of Guanyin. This tale seems to have a Taoist origin. The story is set in the Qianfu era of the reign of Emperor Xizong of Tang.

A virtuous minister Chen Bao and his wife Lady Han are still childless when they are getting older. When Chen rejects his wife's recommendation to take a concubine, she suggested that they pray to the bodhisattva Guanyin for help. Guanyin saw that the couple was destined to not have any children, so she ordered a Boy Who Brings Wealth (traditional Chinese: 招財僮子; simplified Chinese: 招财童子; pinyin: Zhāocái Tóngzǐ) to be born into the family. Lady Han soon gave birth to a boy, who was named Chen Lian. She died when his son was only five years old.

As a child, Chen Lian was not interested in civil or military pursuits, but rather, in religious enlightenment, much to his father's disapproval. At the age of seven, his father finally gave in to his pleas and allowed him to study under the tutelage of the Yellow Dragon Immortal (traditional Chinese: 黃龍仙人; simplified Chinese: 黄龙仙人; pinyin: Huánglóng Xiānrén). Chen Lian was renamed to Shancai and became a dutiful apprentice of the immortal. However, he ignored all of his father's requests to visit home during his apprenticeship.

When his father's 60th birthday approached, Shancai was once again asked to go home for a visit. As his master was away, Shancai decided to return home since it was a special occasion. On his way down a mountain path, he heard a voice crying out for help. Upon investigation, he saw that it was a snake trapped in a bottle for the last 18 years. The snake begged Shancai to release her, and after Shancai did so, she revealed her true form as a giant serpent and wanted to eat him. When Shancai protested at the snake's behaviour, she argued that ēn (恩, an act of kindness) should be repaid with a feud, as is the way of nature. However, the snake agreed to bring the case before three judges.

The first judge was the Golden Water Buffalo Star in human form. He agreed with the snake that given her past experiences with humans, she was right to repay Shancai's kindness by devouring him. The Buffalo related how he was forced out of Heaven by the bodhisattva Kṣitigarbha into the human world to help humans plough the fields. Kṣitigarbha vowed that if the humans did not repay one's kindness by showing kindness in return, his eyes would fall out. As the Buffalo landed face first on Earth, he lost all his upper front teeth. He later suffered greatly, and after years of toiling for his human master, he was butchered and eaten. Because of this, Kṣitigarbha's eyes fell out and landed on Earth and transformed into snails, which buffaloes trample on when they plough the fields.

The second judge was the Taoist master Zhuang Zhou, who also sided with the snake. He cited an incident where he resurrected a dead man, who repaid his kindness by bringing him to court and accusing him of stealing his money.

The third judge was a young girl. The girl told the snake that she could eat her as well if the snake could show them how it was able to fit into the bottle she was released from. As soon as the snake wormed itself back into the bottle, it was trapped. The girl then revealed herself as Guanyin. When the snake begged for mercy, Guanyin told her that if she wanted to be saved she must engage in religious exercises in the Grotto of the Sounds of the Flood (present-day Fayu Temple) on Mount Putuo. Around this time, Guanyin also gained a new disciple, the Filial Parrot.

Three years later, when Guanyin returned to Mount Putuo, she appeared to Shancai in the middle of the ocean. Shancai joined her in walking across the sea and became her acolyte. With the confirmation of his faith, Shancai's parents were reborn in Heaven. As for the snake, she committed herself to seven years of austerity and eventually cleansed herself of venom and produced a pearl. She transformed into Longnü and joined Shancai as an acolyte of Guanyin.

== As Red Boy ==
Sudhana is the Buddhist name of Red Boy, also known as Honghai'er (traditional Chinese: 紅孩兒; simplified Chinese: 红孩儿; pinyin: Hónghái'ér), an antagonist in the classical novel Journey to the West. Red Boy was the son of Princess Iron Fan and Bull Demon King. As an exchange for punishment after kidnapping Tang Sanzang and Zhu Bajie, as well as irreverently usurping Guanyin's lotus seat, Red Boy surrendered to Guanyin and became her attendant.
