= Yunü =

Daoist deity in Chinese mythology

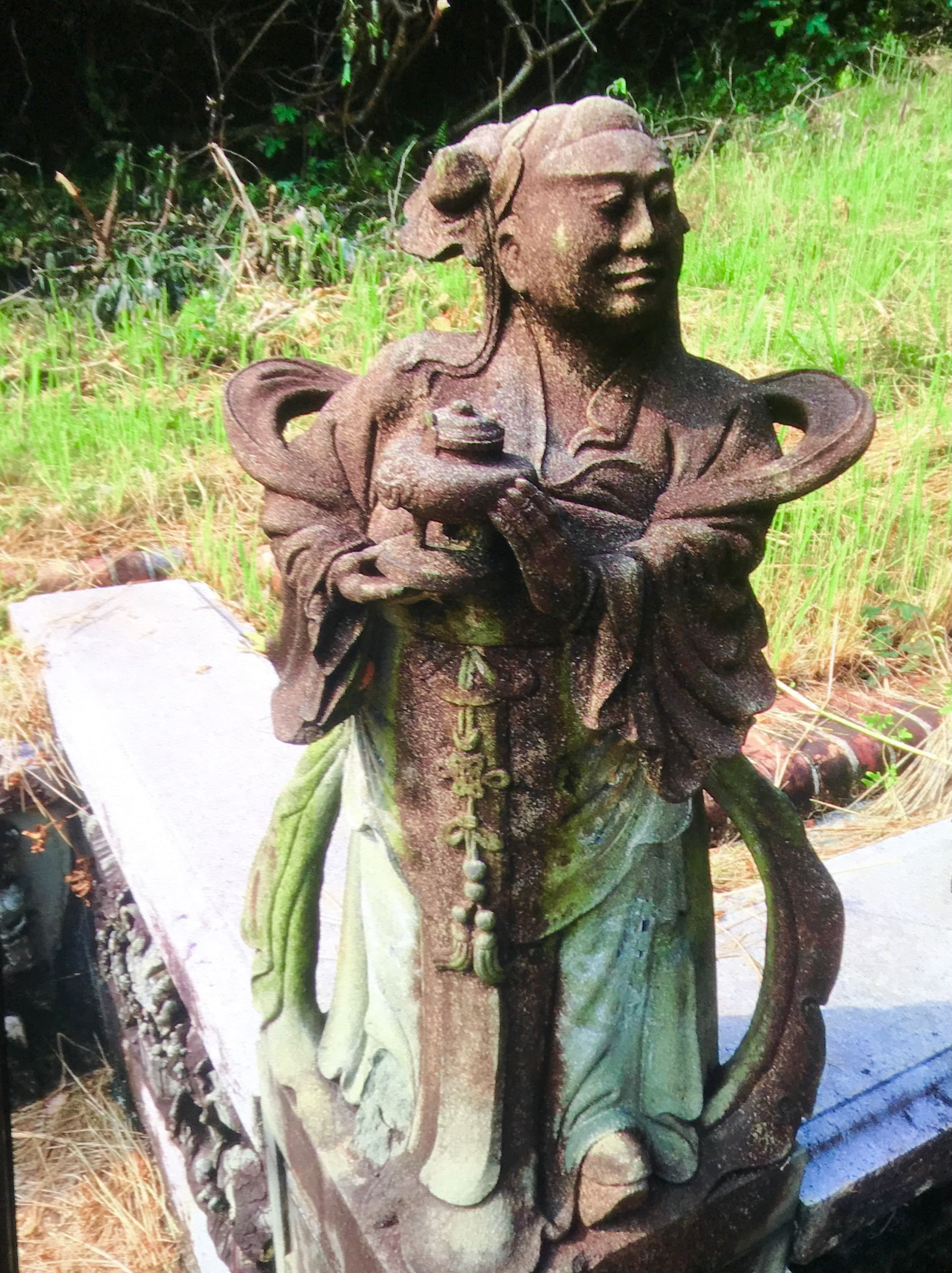
Statue of Yunü

Yunü (Chinese: 玉女; pinyin: Yùnǚ; lit. 'Jade Girl', 'Jade Maiden') is a Daoist deity or goddess in Chinese mythology and Chinese traditional religion who, along with her male counterpart Jintong "Golden Boy", are favored servants of the Jade Emperor and Zhenwudadi. They are also believed to serve as guides in the underworld and the protectors of houses and temples.

The couple helps virtuous souls over a golden bridge to paradise and souls whose good deeds outweighed the bad over a silver bridge to paradise. Therefore, by erecting the Golden Boy and Jade Maiden by the grave of the deceased, living family members hope that the deceased will not venture into the courts of hell but instead lead their afterlife in paradise.

== Legends ==
Yunü and Jintong have appeared in several stories since the Song and Yuan dynasties and have become important figures in Chinese mythology. Specific examples are the nanxi version of the legend Jintong and Yunü, and Yuan dynasty writer Jia Zhongming's zaju by the same name. In this context, Yunü is called Longnü, and Jintong is called Shancai Tongzi. According to the Shenyijing, Yunü and her companions loved to play pitch-pot (Chinese: 投壺; pinyin: tóuhú), a game in which arrows or darts are thrown into a vase.

In the Buddhāvataṃsaka Sūtra, she and Jintong seek enlightenment and are acolytes of Guanyin. In this context, Yunü is called Longnü, and Jintong is called Shancai Tongzi (Sudhana "Child of Wealth").

In the classic Chinese novel Journey to the West, Yunü is a servant maid of the Jade Emperor in Heaven. She falls in love with a star god called Kuimulang and decides to elope with him. However, she doesn't want to ruin Heaven's pureness, so she reincarnates as a human. She enters the human world as Baihuaxiu (Chinese: 百花羞), the third princess of the Kingdom of Baoxiang (Chinese: 寶象國). Meanwhile, Kui Mulang travels to Earth and waits for her, becoming a demon lord, Yellow Robe. The demon kidnaps the princess (who has no memory of her existence as Yunü), marries her, and they have two children.

Some folktales say that Xue Dingshan and Fan Lihua were originally the Golden Boy and Jade Girl. The Jade Emperor was furious with them and wanted to punish them for breaking the celestial utensils. Fortunately, the Old Man of the South Pole begged for their mercy and was demoted to the mortal world.

In the Hanyi ji play, the protagonists Qi Liang and Meng Jiang are reincarnations of Jintong and Yunü.

In most popular versions of the Butterfly Lovers, the protagonists Liang Shanbo and Zhu Yingtai are human reincarnations of Jintong and Yunü who are expelled from Heaven Court by Guanyin or the Jade Emperor for their sins and forced to live as a thwarted couple for three or seven generations before being reunited and restored to their original status.

== In popular culture ==
- Yunü is a common designation for a beautiful woman or, in Daoism, for a xian or "immortal".
- Literary works often refer to attractive and well-matched couples as a Jintong and Yunü.
- Yunü is a common name for Usnea, a species of lichen.
- During the Spring Festival, pictures featuring Yunü and Jintong can be found on the doors of many households.
- There are several mountain peaks bearing Yunü's name, such as the Mount Hua Yünu (華山玉女), one in the Wuyi Mountains (武夷山), and another in the Yuntai Mountains (云台山).

== Sources ==
- Li Jianping 李劍平, ed. (1998). Zhongguo shenhua renwu cidian 中國神話人物辞典 (Xi'an : Shanxi renmin chubanshe), 144.
