= The Stonecutter =

Dutch folk tale

"The Stone-cutter" is a supposed Japanese folk-tale published by Andrew Lang in The Crimson Fairy Book (1903), taken from David Brauns's Japanische Märchen (1885). However, the story has been pointed out to closely resemble the "Japanese Stonecutter" parable in Dutch novelist Multatuli's Max Havelaar (1860), which is in turn a reworking of a story written by Wolter Robert baron van Hoëvell a.k.a. "Jeronimus".(1842)

The tale is closely related to the themes of The Fisherman and His Wife, a well known fairy tale collected by the Brothers Grimm.

In the legend, a poor stone-cutter craves to become a rich man, then a prince; his wishes are granted in turn by a mountain spirit. He then enviously desires to become the sun, impervious to heat; then clouds, undaunted by the sun; then the mountain, which withstands the rain which falls from the clouds. But when a stone-cutter starts chipping away at him, he wants to revert to being a man, and comes to the realization that he is satisfied with his station in life as a humble stone-cutter.

== Textual notes ==
"The Stone-cutter" was translated into English by Andrew Lang in The Crimson Fairy Book (1903), taken from Japanische Märchen und Sagen collected by David Brauns (Leipzig, 1885).

A large-print, illustrated version "The Stonecutter" by Gerald McDermott was published in 1975.

=== Dutch parable ===
Brauns's tale closely follows the "Japanese Stonecutter" parable (Note: Referred to as parable by various authorities.) in Dutch author Multatuli (Eduard Douwes Dekker)'s novel Max Havelaar (1860). It was translated into English by Baron Nahuijs in 1868.

Multatuli's parable, in turn, was an adaptation of the story written by Wolter Robert baron van Hoëvell under the pen name "Jeronimus" and published in the Tijdschrift voor Nederlandsch-Indië (1842).

Dutch author Roby Bellemans has also published a retelling of Multatuli's story, translated into English as "And then also that Wish Came True" (Note: There is also a Vietnamese translation Và sau đa mà ao ước đó cũng thành hiện thực, by Thuy Tien Le.)

== Analysis ==
=== AT type ===
According to the Aarne-Thompson classification system of fairy tales, The Stonecutter is of tale type 555, "(The) Fisherman and his Wife ", represented by the corresponding Grimms"' tale.

The morals of such stories recommend against trying to be anything but yourself and to be careful what you wish for while embodying the spirit of the saying "the grass is always greener on the other side".

=== Historical remarks ===
That the tale was related to the Grimms' fairy tale The Fisherman and His Wife was remarked on by Felix Liebrecht in an 1885 review of Brauns's book.

And even before Brauns's German-translated version appeared, Charles Wycliffe Goodwin noted in 1875 that "The Japanese Stone-cutter" from the Dutch Novel was similar to the Grimms' tale. (Note: The Proceedings of the Asiatic Society for 18 January 1875 to 30 June 1875, Volume III, Part II, not published until 1885.)

=== Authentic Japanese analogues ===
Goodwin also inquired as to the (Japanese) authenticity of the tale, and discovered that while no Japanese tale of the kind was in print, many versions continued to be orally told during his time. He printed one variant obtained thorough informants entitled "The Story of the Ambitious Mice" which paralleled it to a large extent: the mice attempt to marry their daughter to the sun, the cloud, the wind, and the wall, until the last potential groom complains he is vulnerable to the mice gnawing him, and they marry the daughter to her own kind. Japanese sources the legend is said to be European, and the stonecutter's name is given as Hans..

=== Chinese versions ===
Chinese folklorist Ting Nai-tung (Ding Naitong) who catalogued The Type Index of Chinese Folktales noted that there are Chinese tales of composite nature with components of the ATU 555 type.

=== Russian analogues ===
Alexander Pushkin wrote the verse "The Tale of the Fisherman and the Fish", considered to be derived from Grimms' tale disseminated among the Russian populace, so it is of course another parallel.

Substantially similar to Pushikin is "The Goldfish" from Alexander Afanasyev's collection of Russian wonder-tales. It is "The Goldfish" (Guterman's translation ) which classed as AT 555 in Stith Thompson's own anthology.

"The Goldfish" has been used in comparative Poppovian analysis opposite the Grimms' tale and the Japanese Stone-cutter story.

=== A Nanai variant ===
In a Nanai foktale, a boy slips and injures himself on ice, and is told ice must be stronger that him. The ice tells him the sun is stronger, since it can melt the ice. The cloud is stronger than the sun, the wind is stronger than the cloud, and the mountain is stronger than the wind. However, a tree growing on the mountain tears at it with its roots, so it must be stronger. But since a man can cut down a tree, that makes him the strongest of all.

=== As an Asian tale ===
Some commentators (such as those from the children's education field) take the tale at face value as an Asian tale. The story of the Stonecutter is seen as a prime example of cyclical thinking in Eastern philosophy.

While the similar cumulative tale The Fisherman and His Wife is explicitly moralist in tone, The Stonecutter's lesson proceeds from a more philosophical viewpoint. At the end, the stonecutter simply realises that his greedy longings are futile because power is relative (compare: food chain). The fisherman's wife however has no end to her ambition, and keeps asking for more influence; first nobleman, then queen, then empress, then pope, until at last she wants to become God. The magic fish then punishes her [ blasphemous ] greed by sending her back to her poor hut (compare "hubris" in Greek mythology.)

The Stonecutter's central theme is reflected in the popular hand game paper, rock, scissors, which also has its origins in East Asia.

== See also ==
- Nontransitive game
- The Husband of the Rat's Daughter

== External links and references ==
- The Japanese Stonecutter - English translation of the end of chapter 11 of Max Havelaar
- The Stonecutter - original translation by Andrew Lang from The Crimson Fairy Tale Book.
- Hofus the Stonecutter - from the Riverside Third Reader (adapted)
