= The Mouse Bride =

Chinese folktale and New Year custom

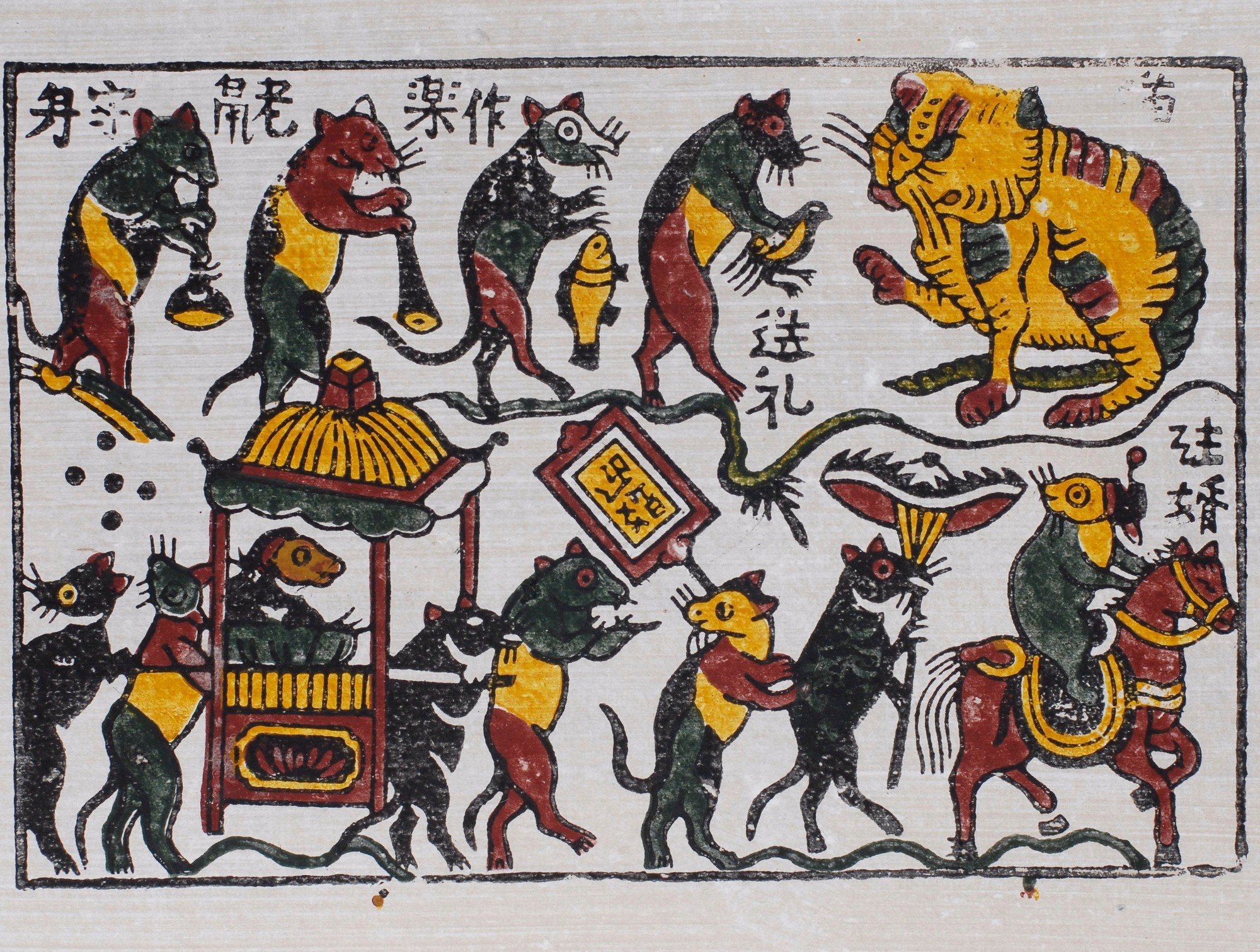
A Vietnamese Đông Hồ painting showing a mouse wedding procession.

The Mouse Bride, also known as The Mouse Wedding (Chinese: 老鼠嫁女; pinyin: Lǎoshǔ jiànǚ), is a Chinese folktale and folk custom linked to Chinese New Year. The story tells of mice holding a wedding, often with a mouse family looking for a husband for their daughter. In some parts of China, people traditionally left food for mice and avoided making noise on the day believed to be their wedding day.

== Folktale ==
The Mouse Wedding has several versions. One version is similar to an Indian story found in the third book of the Panchatantra. Chinese scholar Ji Xianlin studied this story and compared it with Chinese mouse wedding tales.

In the Indian story, an ascetic saves a mouse that has fallen from a hawk's mouth. He uses magic to turn the mouse into a girl and raises her with his wife. When she grows up, he looks for a powerful husband for her. He first asks the Sun, but the Sun says that the Cloud is stronger because it can hide him. The Cloud says that the Wind is stronger because it can blow clouds away. The Wind says that the Mountain is stronger because it can stop the wind. The Mountain then says that mice are stronger because they can dig holes through it. The girl chooses a mouse as her husband, and the ascetic changes her back into a mouse.

In a common Chinese version, a mouse father wants to find the strongest husband for his daughter. He asks the Sun, the Cloud, the Wind, and a Wall. Each says that something else is stronger. The Wall finally says that mice are stronger because they can make holes in it. The father then decides that another mouse would be a good husband for his daughter.

Other Chinese versions have a different ending. In some, the mouse family chooses a cat as the husband because mice fear cats. The cat then eats the bride. Other stories show a cat attacking the wedding procession. These endings are also common in Chinese folk art.

== Spring Festival customs ==
Mouse Wedding customs are found in different parts of China. Most take place during the first lunar month, but the exact date varies. In some areas, families turn off their lights, go to bed early, and tell children not to make noise. They also leave rice, cakes, sweets, or peanuts near walls and mouse holes. People believed that disturbing the mice's wedding could cause the mice to damage their homes or crops during the coming year.

In Shanxi, some communities celebrate the Mouse Wedding on the tenth day of the first lunar month. In Pingyao County, families traditionally place wheat cakes near walls to congratulate the mice on their wedding. The custom is called "congratulating the mouse wedding" (贺老鼠嫁女).

In Hunan, the custom takes place on a different day in some areas. In Ningyuan County, the seventeenth day of the first lunar month is known as the Mouse Wedding day. People traditionally avoid opening boxes and cabinets because they believe this may disturb the mice. Children may also leave sweets and peanuts in dark places on the previous evening.

Some older customs in Shaanxi took place between the tenth and twelfth days of the first lunar month. Local records describe families going to bed early, keeping their lamps off, or avoiding cooking and other household work. These actions were meant to avoid disturbing the mice.

In Qinghai, some communities have a custom called "steaming blind mice" (蒸瞎老鼠). On the fourteenth day of the first lunar month, families traditionally make twelve mouse-shaped figures from dough without giving them eyes. They steam the figures and place them on an offering table during the Lantern Festival. The custom expresses the hope that mice will eat grass roots instead of stored grain or crops.

== Historical records ==
The Mouse Wedding was also described in older Chinese writings. During the Qing dynasty, the writer Qian Yong (钱泳) recorded a story called Mice Eating Immortal Grass (鼠食仙草) in his book Lüyuan Conghua (履园丛话). The story describes a family hearing music and seeing tiny people holding a wedding inside their house. The figures are later revealed to be mice that gained magical powers after eating special grass. Qian Yong also wrote that people in his hometown went to bed early without lighting lamps on New Year's Day, telling children that the mice were holding a wedding.

== Beliefs ==
The Mouse Wedding is linked to old beliefs about mice and farming. Mice could destroy stored food and damage crops, but they were also seen as symbols of fertility because they reproduce quickly. Some people believed that giving mice food and allowing them to hold their wedding in peace would help keep them away from the household.

The wedding custom also expressed the wish to send mice and their troubles away from the home. In many folk stories and New Year prints, a cat appears at the wedding and threatens the mice. The cat represents the hope of getting rid of mice. The custom therefore had two purposes: wishing for good fortune and protection from mouse damage.

The rat is also the first animal in the Chinese zodiac. In Chinese culture, its ability to have many offspring has been linked with wishes for children and a large family.

== In art and literature ==
The Mouse Wedding is a common subject in Chinese folk art. It appears in paper cutting, embroidery, and New Year woodblock prints known as Nianhua. The mice are often shown wearing human clothes, carrying a bride in a sedan chair, playing musical instruments, and bringing wedding gifts. Some pictures include a cat waiting beside the wedding procession.

The subject was popular in New Year prints from places such as Wuqiang in Hebei, Yangliuqing in Tianjin, Mianzhu in Sichuan, and Taohuawu in Suzhou. In one Wuqiang print held by the National Art Museum of China, the bride rides in a decorated sedan chair, while the groom rides a toad. A black cat waits in front of the procession. In other prints, the mice try to give gifts to a cat so that it will let their wedding continue.

The Mouse Wedding also appears in Vietnamese Đông Hồ woodblock prints. In the Vietnamese version, mice carry wedding gifts and play music while others bring offerings to a large cat. The picture is known as Đám cưới chuột (Mouse Wedding).

Some Chinese New Year prints combine the Mouse Wedding with stories from Journey to the West. One print from Shanghai Xiaoxiaochang is called Tang Sanzang Fetching Scriptures: Western Mouse Wedding (唐僧取经 西洋老鼠嫁女). Another print from Taohuawu is called Mouse Wedding in the Bottomless Cave (无底洞老鼠嫁女). The second print uses the story of the mouse spirit who tries to marry Tang Sanzang.

The writer Lu Xun mentioned the Mouse Wedding in his essay "Dogs, Cats, and Mice" (狗·猫·鼠), included in Dawn Blossoms Plucked at Dusk (朝花夕拾). He remembered seeing a New Year print of mice dressed like people and holding a wedding. As a child, he hoped to see the mice's wedding procession on the night of the fourteenth day of the first lunar month, but he never saw it.

In 1983, Shanghai Animation Film Studio produced a paper-cut animated short film called Mouse Wedding, based on the traditional folktale.

== See also ==
- The Husband of the Rat's Daughter
- The Mouse Turned into a Maid
- Panchatantra
- Mouse Scroll (Nezumi Sōshi)
- Nianhua
- Chinese folk religion
- Chinese New Year
