= Golden-Nosed White-Haired Mouse Spirit =

- Journey to the West character
- First appearance: Chapter 82

In-universe information
- Aliases: Lady Earth Flow; Half-Guanyin
- Species: Mouse
- Weapon: Twin swords (双股剑)
- Family: Heavenly King Li Jing (godfather); Nezha (godbrother)
- Abode: Bottomless Pit (无底洞), Trap-Hollow Mountain (陷空山)

The Golden-Nosed White-Haired Mouse Spirit (Chinese: 金鼻白毛老鼠精; pinyin: Jīnbí Báimáo Lǎoshǔ Jīng), also known as Lady Earth Flow (地涌夫人) and Half-Guanyin (半截观音), is a yaoguai in the 16th-century Chinese novel Journey to the West (西游记). Appearing in the novel, she attempts to seduce and marry the monk Tang Sanzang to consume his yang essence. The spirit has a connection with Heavenly King Li Jing, whom she identifies as her godfather, and with Nezha, whom she identifies as her godbrother.

== In Journey to the West ==
According to the novel, the Mouse Spirit originally cultivated her powers at Vulture Peak (Lingshan), where she stole and consumed the Buddha's fragrant flowers and candles. The Heavenly King Li Jing and Nezha were sent to capture her, but the Buddha ordered them to spare her life. She subsequently recognized Li Jing as her godfather (义父) and Nezha as her godbrother (义兄), and established memorial tablets for them at her residence. She later established her residence in the Bottomless Pit (无底洞) at Trap-Hollow Mountain (陷空山).

During the pilgrims' journey, the Mouse Spirit disguises herself as a woman bound to a tree in the Black Pine Forest (黑松林). Tang Sanzang takes her to the Zhenhai Temple (镇海寺), where she kills and eats several monks before abducting him and taking him to the Bottomless Pit. She attempts to force Tang Sanzang to marry her so that she can obtain his vital essence and attain the status of a Taiyi Golden Immorta (太乙金仙, Tàiyǐ Jīnxiān), one of the highest possible ranks a spiritual being can achieve.

When Sun Wukong enters the Bottomless Pit to rescue Tang Sanzang, he discovers the memorial tablets dedicated to Li Jing and Nezha. He takes the tablets to Heaven and confronts Li Jing over the Mouse Spirit's actions. Li Jing initially does not remember her, but Nezha reminds him of their previous encounter. Li Jing and Nezha then go to the Bottomless Pit with heavenly soldiers, capture the Mouse Spirit, and take her away.

== Origins ==
The Mouse Spirit may have come from an old legend in the Kingdom of Khotan. In the Great Tang Records on the Western Regions (大唐西域記), Xuanzang tells of a large rat with gold and silver fur that lived at a place called the "Rat Mound" (鼠壤墳). When a large Xiongnu army invaded Khotan, the king prayed to the Rat King for help. That night, he dreamed that the Rat King promised to help him defeat the invaders. The rats then chewed through the enemy's bowstrings, saddle straps, and other military equipment, allowing the Khotanese army to win the battle. The king built a shrine to thank the rats, and the people continued to worship them. Li Tianfei suggests that the Rat King's gold and silver fur may have inspired the Mouse Spirit's golden nose and white hair in Journey to the West.

The Mouse Spirit's connection to Heavenly King Li may also come from Buddhist stories about Vaiśravaṇa (毗沙门天王), the Guardian of the North. A Buddhist text called the Vaiśravaṇa Ritual (毗沙门仪轨) tells how Vaiśravaṇa helped a Tang army by sending golden rats to chew through the enemy's bowstrings and weapons. Zhu Gang argues that this story came from the older Khotanese legend. He also notes that a painting from Dunhuang, known as P.4518, shows a rat deity beside Vaiśravaṇa. Zhu believes that these stories helped shape the Mouse Spirit's role as Li Jing's adopted daughter in Journey to the West.

== Folk culture ==
The Mouse Spirit's attempt to marry Tang Sanzang has been described as a variant of the Chinese "Mouse Bride" or "Mouse Marriage" tradition (老鼠嫁女 or 老鼠娶亲). The motif is found in different forms in Chinese folk culture and New Year popular art. In one common version, the mouse family seeks a powerful husband for their daughter, approaching figures such as the sun, clouds, wind and a wall before turning to the cat, which is feared by mice. The story usually ends with the cat eating the mouse bride.

The motif also appears in older literary traditions. Li Tianfei points to a story in the Tang-period Guangyi Ji (广异记) in which a mouse spirit takes a human woman as a wife, noting the connection between the mouse–human marriage motif and the Mouse Spirit's attempt to marry Tang Sanzang in Journey to the West.

The two traditions were combined in some later Chinese New Year prints. A Suzhou Taohuawu print titled Wudong Laoshujianü (无底洞老鼠嫁女, "Mouse Bride of the Bottomless Pit") combines the story of the Mouse Spirit from Journey to the West with the "Mouse Bride" folk theme. The print depicts the Mouse Spirit seeking to marry Tang Sanzang and bribing the Old Cat King (老猫王) to act as a matchmaker, while Guanyin appears in the form of a cat spirit and defeats her.

A Shanghai Xiaojiaochang New Year print titled Tang Sanzang Fetches Scriptures: The Western Mouse Marries Her Daughter (唐僧取经 西洋老鼠嫁女) likewise combines the Journey to the West story with the "Mouse Bride" theme.

== See also ==
- Journey to the West
- Vaiśravaṇa
- The Mouse Bride
