= Marshal Tianpeng =

Taoist god of protection

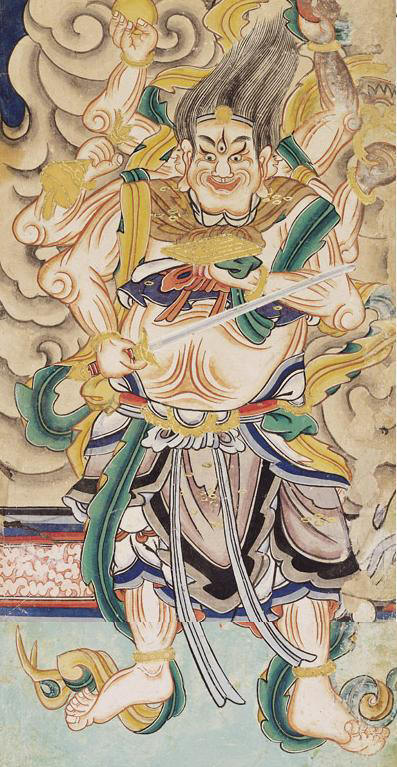
Marshal Tianpeng

Marshal Tianpeng (Chinese: 天蓬元帅; pinyin: Tiānpéng Yuánshuài; lit. 'Heavenly Canopy Marshal') is a god in Taoism and Chinese folk religion. He is one of the Four Saints of the North Pole and serves as a heavenly general who fights evil spirits. In the 16th-century Chinese novel Journey to the West, he is sent from heaven and reborn as Zhu Bajie, who later becomes a disciple of Tang Sanzang.

== Taoist beliefs and origin ==
In the Daoist text Daofa Huiyuan (道法會元), Volume 156, Marshal Tianpeng is given the name Bian Zhuang (卞莊), a man who lived during the Zhou dynasty. The text identifies him with Bian Zhuangzi (卞莊子), a figure from the time of Confucius. Bian Zhuang is known in older Chinese stories for killing tigers. The same text says that Tianpeng is a form of the Pojun Star (破軍星) of the Big Dipper and a later form of Jinmei Laojun (金眉老君).

Marshal Tianpeng is one of the Four Saints of the North Pole (北極四聖). The other three are Marshal Tianyou (天猷副元帥), Yisheng Baode Zhenjun (翊聖保德真君), and Zhenwu Dadi (真武大帝). They serve as heavenly generals who protect the Dao and fight evil spirits.

Volume 156 of Daofa Huiyuan describes Tianpeng as having three heads and six arms. He wears black clothes and a black hat. His weapons include an axe, a rope, a bow, arrows, a sword, and a halberd. He commands an army of 300,000 heavenly soldiers. The text also names several generals under him, including the One-Qi Commander (一炁都統大將軍), the Five Monthly Generals (直月五將軍), and the Four-Eyed Old Man (四目老翁). He is also served by 36 great heavenly generals.

Volume 217 gives another description of Tianpeng. He has three heads, six arms, red hair, and red armor. He is barefoot and carries a bell, an axe, a rope, and a sword. He also holds a seal and the seven stars of the Big Dipper. In this account, he leads 360,000 mounted soldiers, together with the Thunder God, the Lightning Goddess, and the gods of wind and rain.

Tianpeng is also a god of protection in Daoist rituals. Daoist priests call upon him to drive away demons, ghosts, and illness. The Tianpeng Shenzhou (天蓬神咒), or Divine Incantation of Tianpeng, is used for this purpose. The spell was known during the Tang dynasty and remained part of Daoist rituals during the Song dynasty.

The Daoist writer Du Guangting recorded stories about the Tianpeng incantation in his Daojiao Lingyan Ji (道教靈驗記). One story tells of a man named Cao Kui (曹戣), who used the spell to protect himself from evil spirits and later escaped from captivity. Another tells of Wang Daoke (王道珂), who used the spell to drive fox spirits out of a temple. These stories show how the spell was used for protection and the removal of evil spirits.

Tianpeng later became known as the former heavenly identity of Zhu Bajie in Journey to the West. In some later folk traditions, he is shown as a pig-headed god rather than a heavenly general. This form is also found in Taiwanese folk religion.

== Role in Journey to the West ==
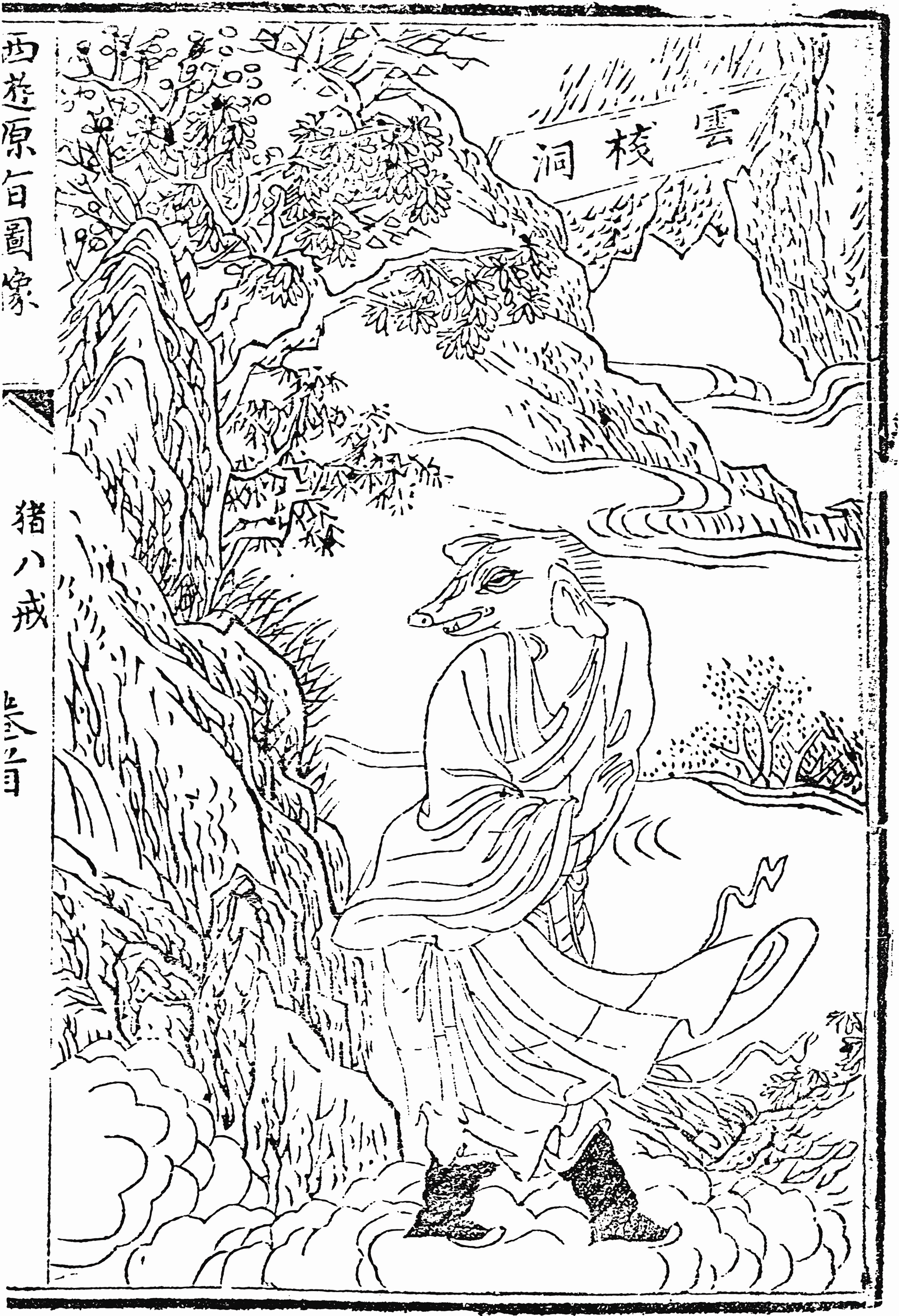
15th-century depiction of Zhu Bajie, an incarnation of Marshal Tianpeng.

In the 16th-century Ming dynasty novel Journey to the West, Marshal Tianpeng is a celestial general who commands 80,000 naval troops of the Heavenly River (天河). He is banished from heaven after attempting to court Chang'e at a heavenly banquet. He is then reincarnated on Earth and enters the womb of a sow, becoming Zhu Bajie (猪八戒).

Zhu Bajie later becomes one of Tang Sanzang's disciples on the journey to obtain the Buddhist scriptures. He is portrayed as lazy, gluttonous, and fond of women, but also assists the group in their battles. At the end of the journey, he is given the title "Cleanser of Altars" (净坛使者) by the Buddha.

== Temple ==
The Tianhou Temple (天后宫) in Tian'ao Village, Juguang Township, Lianjiang County (Matsu Islands), Taiwan, enshrines Marshal Tianpeng. In this temple, Marshal Tianpeng is depicted as a red-faced, long-bearded military general. His statue shows him sitting with his left fist resting on his knee and his right hand holding a nine-toothed rake (钉耙).

Tianpeng Marshal Fortune Palace in Dacun Township, Changhua County, Taiwan, enshrines Marshal Tianpeng as the main deity.
