= Ysopet =

Ysopet ("Little Aesop", also spelled Isopet) refers to a medieval collection of fables in French literature, specifically to versions of Aesop's Fables. Alternatively the term Isopet-Avionnet indicates that the fables are drawn from both Aesop and Avianus.

== The fables of Marie de France ==
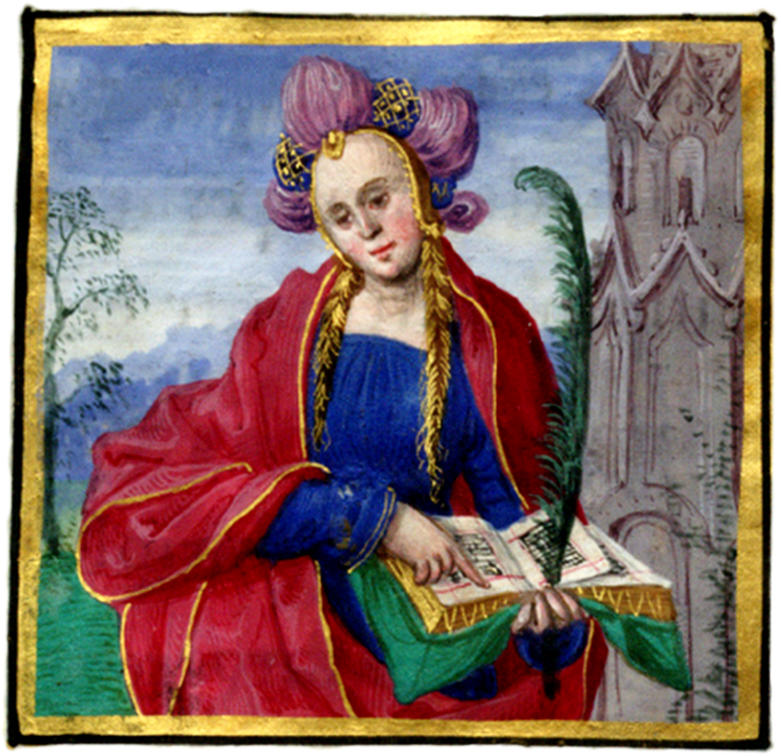
A miniature from a mediaeval book of hours

The origin of the term 'Ysopet' dates back to the twelfth century, where it was first used by Marie de France, whose collection of 102 fables, written in Anglo-Norman octosyllabic couplets, she claims to have translated from an original work by Alfred the Great. Since there is no evidence of any such Old English material, this has been disputed.

The fables come from a variety of sources and feature not simply animals (and insects) but human beings as well. The first forty correspond to one of the Romulus collections of Aesop but even here there are variations. The story she calls "The Dog and the Cheese" differs from Classical versions of The Dog and its Reflection precisely in the detail that it is cheese rather than a bone or piece of meat that it is carrying. Many other stories make their first appearance in the Ysopet, particularly those featuring human beings. One at least, The Mouse Takes a Wife, only appears for the first time in the West but has earlier eastern analogues. Others still fit into well established categories of folk tale and suggest an oral transmission.

== The morals ==
It is in drawing moral conclusions from the behaviour of the characters involved that Marie is at her most individual, reflecting the realities of 12th century feudal society at the same time as concern for the individual welfare of those within it. While she accepts its stratification, her criticism of those who abuse their position is sharp and her sympathy for the plight of the downtrodden is obvious. In particular she criticizes the inequalities of the legal system (The Wolf and the Lamb, The Dog and the Sheep), injudicious choice of deputy and betrayal of faith.

Marie's portrayal of women in particular is two-edged and not always consistent. In the tale of The Wife and her Husband, where a resourceful wife persuades the husband that he has not really seen her in bed with another man, Marie remarks that 'good sense and imagination are more valuable and useful to many people than their money or their family'. But in the similar situation of The Wife and Her Husband in the Forest she concludes that 'for this reason women are criticized for their deceptiveness: these lying tricksters have more art than the devil.' The humorous ending of the otherwise horrifying story of The Man and the Wife Who Quarreled, in which a husband cuts out the tongue of his wife only to have her continue their quarrel in sign language, draws from Marie the wry comment that 'This fable shows what one can often see: if a fool talks foolishness and someone else comes along and speaks sense to him, he won't believe it but gets angry instead. Even when he knows he is absolutely in the wrong, he wants to have the last say, and no one can make him shut up.' The change of gender at the end indicates that for Marie, as for Jean de la Fontaine five centuries later, 'Many men are women too' (Fables VI.6). Her main concern is not gender politics but, as throughout the Ysopet, the wise, foolish or vicious use of the tongue.
