= Cumulative tale =

Form of storytelling

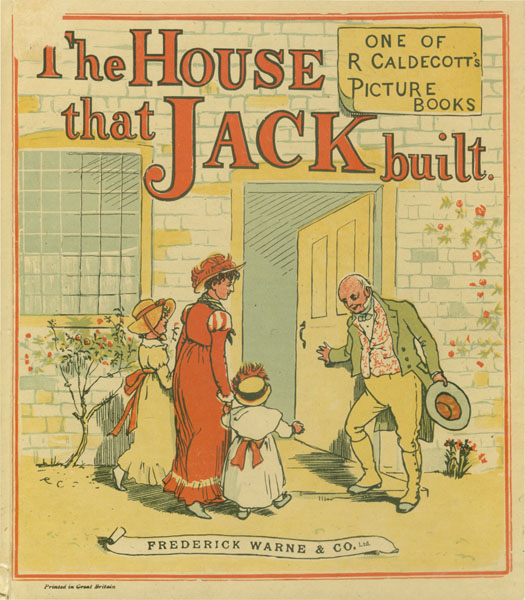
Cumulative tale "This Is the House That Jack Built"

In a cumulative tale, sometimes also called a chain tale, action or dialogue repeats and builds up in some way as the tale progresses. With only the sparest of plots, these tales often depend upon repetition and rhythm for their effect, and can require a skilled storyteller to negotiate their tongue-twisting repetitions in performance. The climax is sometimes abrupt and sobering as in "The Gingerbread Man". The device often takes the form of a cumulative song or nursery rhyme. Many cumulative tales feature a series of animals or forces of nature each more powerful than the last.

The predictable structure of cumulative stories has been used to teach children to count.

== History ==
Cumulative tales have a long pedigree. In an early Jewish Midrash, considered to date from the sixth century CE, Abraham is brought before King Nimrod, who commands him to worship fire. Abraham replies that it would be more reasonable to worship water, which can quench fire and is therefore more powerful. When this premise is granted, he points out that the clouds, as sustainers of water, are more worthy of worship, and then that the wind that disperses them is more powerful still. Finally he confronts Nimrod with the observation that "man can stand up against the wind or shield himself behind the walls of his house" (Genesis Rabba xxxviii).

There is a similar tale, The Mouse Turned into a Maid, in the Panchatantra, in which the mouse-maid is successively introduced to the sun, the cloud, the wind and the mountain. She prefers each in turn as stronger than the last, but finally a mouse is found to be stronger than even the mountain, and so she marries the mouse. Stories of this type, such as the Japanese The Husband of the Rat's Daughter, are widely diffused.

== Classification ==
In the Aarne-Thompson classification system, types 2000–2100 are all cumulative tales, including:

- Chains Based on Numbers, Objects, Animals, or Names 2000–2020
  How the rich man paid his servant 2010
  The house is burned down 2014
  The goat that would not go home 2015
  Fair Katrinelje and Pif-Paf-Poltrie 2019
- Chains Involving Death 2021–2024
  The cock and the hen 2021
  An Animal Mourns the Death of a Spouse 2022
- Chains Involving Eating 2025–2028
  The Fleeing Pancake 2025
  The fat cat 2027
- Chains Involving Other Events 2029–2075
  The Old Woman and Her Pig 2030
  The Sky Is Falling 2033
  This Is the House That Jack Built 2035
  The Mouse Who Was to Marry the Sun 2031C (Japanese, Indian)
  Pulling up the turnip 2044
  Tales in which animals talk 2075

== Other examples of cumulative tales ==
- "The Death of the Little Hen"
- Why Mosquitoes Buzz in People's Ears
- "The Fisherman and His Wife"
- "The Stonecutter"
- Chad Gadya
- Green Eggs and Ham
- Drummer Hoff
- "There Was an Old Lady Who Swallowed a Fly"
- "I Bought Me a Cat", featured in the 1950 Aaron Copland song set Old American Songs
- "The Old Woman and Her Pig"
- The Train to Glasgow by Wilma Horsbrugh , later set to music by The Singing Kettle
- "And the Green Grass Grew All Around" and The Rattlin' Bog
- "Old MacDonald Had a Farm"
- A Fly Went By
- "Court of King Caractacus", a song by Rolf Harris, later recorded by The Singing Kettle
- "The Twelve Days of Christmas"
- "Green Grow the Rushes, O"
- "No News, or What Killed the Dog?", a song by Nat M. Wills
- Fruit dropping on animal, then animal & fruit in conflict. (New Guinea)
- The Napping House, a 1984 book by Audrey Wood
- "Little John and Jacky", a French cumulative tale collected by Jo Chartois
- Millions of Cats, a 1928 book by Wanda Gág
- Il Pulcino Pio, a 2012 Italian hit song.

== See also ==
- Cumulative song

== Relevant literature ==
- Cosbey, Robert C. "The Mak Story and Its Folklore Analogues." Speculum 20, no. 3 (1945): 310–317.
- Masoni, Licia. "Folk Narrative and EFL: A Narrative Approach to Language Learning." Journal of Literature and Art Studies 8, no. 4 (2018): 640-658
- Ramanujan, Attippat Krishnaswami, Stuart H. Blackburn, and Alan Dundes. 1997. A Flowering Tree and Other Oral Tales from India, AK Ramanujan; Edited with a Preface by Stuart Blackburn and Alan Dundes. Univ of California Press.
- Souag, Lameen. "'What Do You Want Money For?': A Chain Tale Between Berber and Songhay." Oral Tradition 37 (2025): 3-18.
- Thomas, Joyce. "'Catch if you can': The cumulative tale." A companion to the fairy tale, ed by Hilda Roderick Ellis Davidson, Hilda Ellis Davidson, Anna Chaudhri, Derek Brewer. Boydell & Brewer. (2003): 123–136.
- Voorhoeve, C. L. 2010. 408–415. A Remarkable Chain Tale from New Guinea. In Kenneth A. McElhanon and Ger Reesink. A mosaic of languages and cultures: Studies celebrating the career of Karl J. Franklin. SIL International.
