= Fair Katrinelje and Pif-Paf-Poltrie =

German fairy tale

Folk tale
- Name: Fair Katrinelje and Pif-Paf-Poltrie
- Aarne–Thompson grouping: ATU 2019
- Country: Germany
- Published in: Grimms' Fairy Tales

"Fair Katrinelje and Pif-Paf-Poltrie" is a German fairy tale collected by the Brothers Grimm in Grimm's Fairy Tales as tale 131. A nonsense tale, it was introduced into the first edition as number 45 of the second volume.

It is Aarne-Thompson type 2019, one of a number of chain tales, or cumulative tales.

== Synopsis ==
Pif-Paf-Poltrie asks Fair Katrinelje's father for leave to marry her. He is told he needs that of "her mother Milk-Cow, her brother High-Pride, her sister Cheese-Love," as well as her own. Going through the list, he obtains it, on the condition of all the others consenting. Fair Katrinelje is last; then she lists her dowry: some pennies, a debt, roots, pretzels, and dried pears—a fine dowry. She guesses at his occupation, and he declares it is finer than what she guesses until she guesses broommaker.
