= Zhu Bajie =

Character of the novel Journey to the West

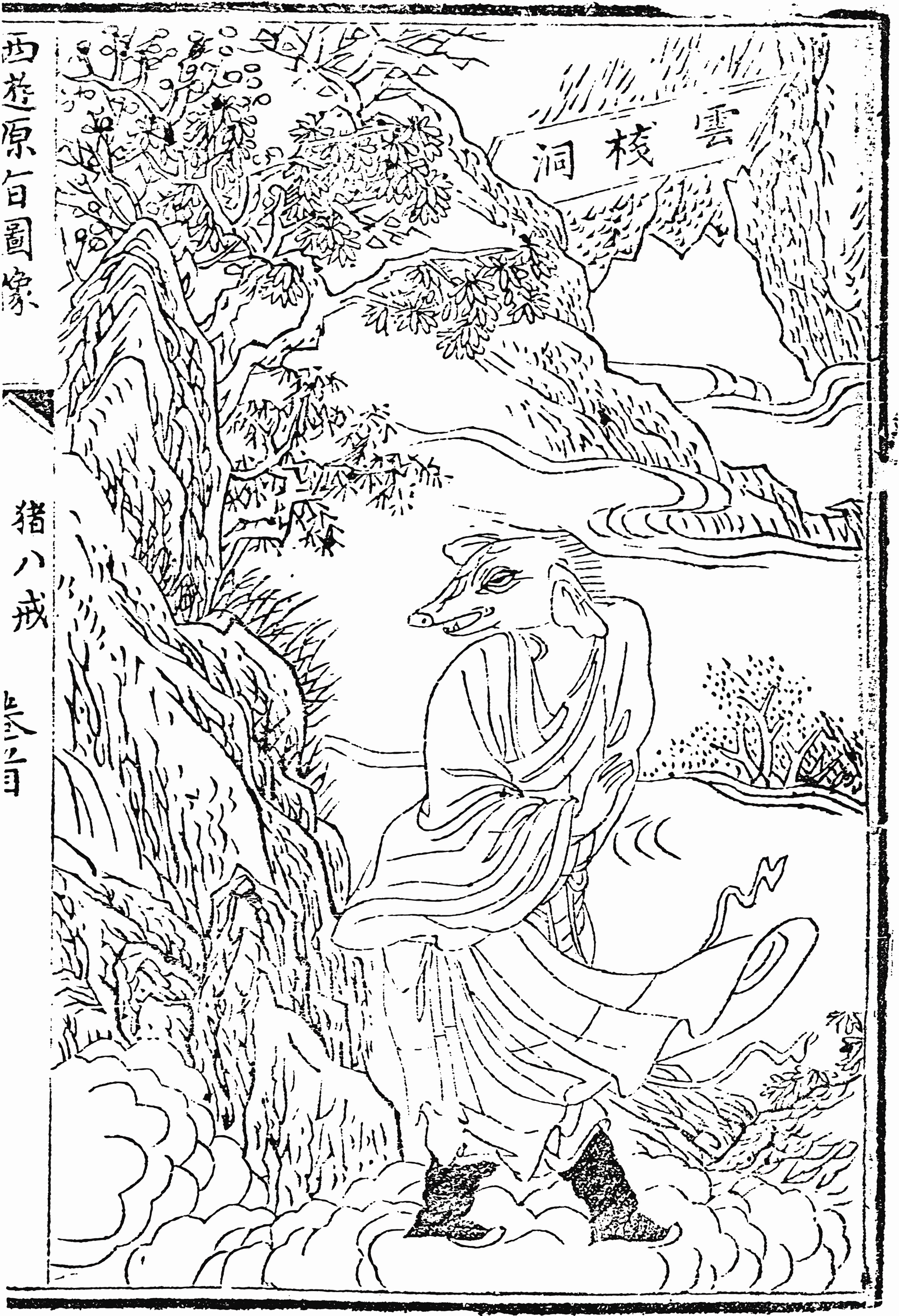
- 15th-century depiction of Zhu Bajie

Chinese name
- Traditional Chinese: 豬八戒
- Simplified Chinese: 猪八戒
Transcriptions
Standard Mandarin
- Hanyu Pinyin: Zhū Bājiè
- Wade–Giles: Chu^{1} Pa^{1}-chieh^{4}
- IPA: [ʈʂú pá.tɕjê]
Gan
- Romanization: Chu Pa̍t Kāi
Yue: Cantonese
- Yale Romanization: Jyū Baatgaai
- Jyutping: Zyu^{1} Baat^{3}-gaai^{3}
- IPA: [tsy˥ pat̚˧.kaj˧]
Southern Min
- Hokkien POJ: Tu Pat-kài

Burmese name
- Burmese: ကျူးပါကျဲ

Vietnamese name
- Vietnamese alphabet: Trư Bát Giới
- Chữ Hán: 豬八戒

Thai name
- Thai: ตือโป๊ยก่าย
- RTGS: Tue Poikai (from Teochew "Tu poih-kài")

Korean name
- Hangul: 저팔계
- Hanja: 豬八戒
Transcriptions
- Revised Romanization: Jeo Palgye

Japanese name
- Kanji: 猪八戒
- Hiragana: ちょ はっかい
Transcriptions
- Romanization: Cho Hakkai

Khmer name
- Khmer: ជូ ប៉ាចេ

Zhu Bajie (Note: (Chinese: 豬八戒; pinyin: Zhū Bājiè; Wade–Giles: Chu^{1} Pa^{1}-chieh^{4})), also named Zhu Wuneng (Note: (he has two Buddhist Dharma names, one, Wuneng (悟能) given to him by the bodhisattva, Guanyin, and one, Bajie (八戒) given to him by Tang Sanzang/Tripiṭaka)), is one of the three disciples of Tang Sanzang, along with Sun Wukong and Sha Heshang, and a major character of the 16th-century novel Journey to the West.

Zhu means "swine", and Bajie means "eight precepts". Before being recruited by the bodhisattva Guanyin, Zhu Bajie was known as Zhu Gāngliè (豬剛巤), literally "Strong-Maned Pig". Buddhist scholars consider both expressions related to "Śīla pāramitā". In many English versions of the story, Zhu Bajie is called "Monk Pig", "Pig", "Piggy", or "Pigsy". Zhu Bajie is a complex and developed character in the novel.

He is portrayed as a fearsome humanoid monster, part human and part pig, who often causes trouble for himself and his companions through laziness, gluttony, and lust. He looks up to his senior fellow disciple Sun Wukong as an older brother. Although he sometimes rebels when angered by Wukong's constant teasing, his schemes usually end in his own humiliation.

His Buddhist name "Zhu Wuneng", given by Bodhisattva Guanyin, means "pig (reincarnated) who is aware of ability" or "pig who rises to power", a reference to the fact that he values himself so much that he forgets his own grisly appearance. Tang Sanzang gave him the nickname Bājiè, meaning "eight restraints" or "eight commandments", to remind him of Buddhist discipline. In the original Chinese novel, he is often called dāizi (呆子), meaning "idiot".

Sun Wukong, Tang Sanzang, and even the narrator consistently refer to him as "the idiot" over the course of the story. Bodhisattvas and other heavenly beings usually refer to him as Tiānpéng (天蓬), his former title when he was a heavenly marshal known as Marshal Tianpeng (天篷元帅) (Tiānpéng Yuánshuài).

In modern times, Zhu Bajie is seen as a patron deity of masseuses, hostesses, and prostitutes in Taiwan and other parts of East Asia.

== Abilities ==
=== Naval warfare ===
Formerly a heavenly marshal and commander of 80,000 celestial sailors, Zhu Bajie is skilled at underwater combat, where he is portrayed as surpassing Sun Wukong.

Sun Wukong is associated with Earth, and, according to the Five Elements theory, Earth and Fire are weakened by Water, explaining his reluctance to fight underwater. In underwater combat, Sun Wukong must either chant the Water Avoidance Spell or transform into a fish or crab in order to move. This makes fighting difficult, as he says, "If we fight underwater, I have to chant the Water Avoidance Spell or transform into a fish or crab just to move. How can I fight such monsters?"

== Character ==
Zhu Bajie originally held the title of Tiānpéng Yuánshuài (天篷元帅; 'Marshal Tianpeng'), commander-in-chief of 80,000 celestial sailors. However, he was later banished for misbehavior. At a party attended by the major figures of Heaven, Bajie saw Chang'e, the goddess of the Moon, for the first time and was captivated by her beauty.

After his drunken attempt to seduce her, she reported him to the Jade Emperor, leading to his banishment to Earth. In popular retellings, Zhu Bajie was sentenced to a thousand lives, each of which would end in a love tragedy. In some retellings of the story, his banishment is linked to Sun Wukong's downfall.

In any case, he was exiled from Heaven and sent to be reincarnated on Earth. By mishap, he fell into a pig well and was reborn as a man-eating pig-monster known as Zhū Gāngliè (猪刚鬛; "strong-maned pig"). In the earlier portions of Journey to the West, Wukong and Tang Sanzang come to Gao village and find that the daughter of the village elder has been kidnapped, with the abductor leaving a note demanding marriage.

In some versions of the story, Bajie convinces the elder to allow him to marry the daughter because of his strength and ability to perform hard labor. The elder recants when he discovers that, although Zhu Bajie does a great deal of work in the fields, he also eats so much that the farm loses money. After investigating, Wukong discovers that Bajie is the culprit.

Bajie fights Wukong. After defeating Bajie, Wukong learns that he has also been recruited by Guanyin to join the pilgrimage and atone for his past sins. At the end of the novel, most of Bajie's fellow pilgrims achieve enlightenment and become arhats, but he does not; although much improved, he remains too attached to his base desires.

He is instead rewarded for his part in the pilgrimage's success with a job as "Cleanser of the Altars" (淨壇使者; Jingtan Shizhe) and with all the leftovers he can eat. However, his actual rank in relation to the others is unclear and may be the lowest.

== Origins and development ==
=== Historical prototype ===
The character's name and pilgrimage origins may derive from Zhu Shixing, a real monk who lived during the late Han dynasty. His secular surname, Zhu, is a homophone for "pig" in Chinese, and his Buddhist name was Bajie. Zhu Shixing traveled west to Khotan before Xuanzang's journey to obtain the complete Sanskrit version of the Prajnaparamita Sutra. According to a historical legend, he wanted to prove the Mahayana doctrine to a local king. He threw the sutra into a fire, which miraculously went out, leaving the text unharmed.

Early depictions show Zhu Bajie and Tang Seng differently. For example, Song dynasty stone carvings at Feilai Peak in Hangzhou show them in separate groups. They appear as parallel, prominent seekers of the Dharma rather than as master and disciple.

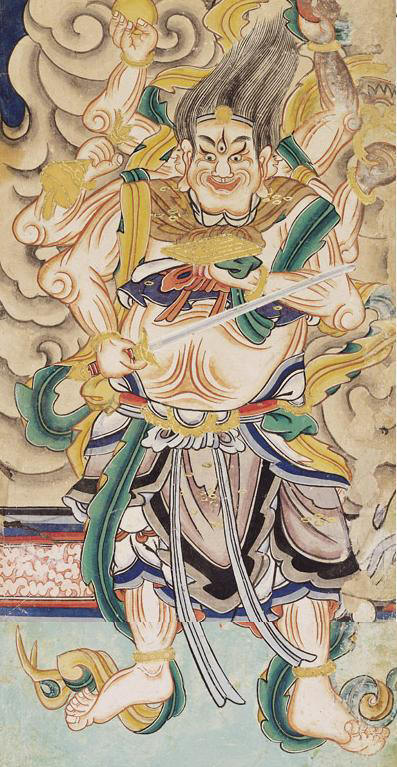
天篷元帥 (Tianpeng Yuanshuai)

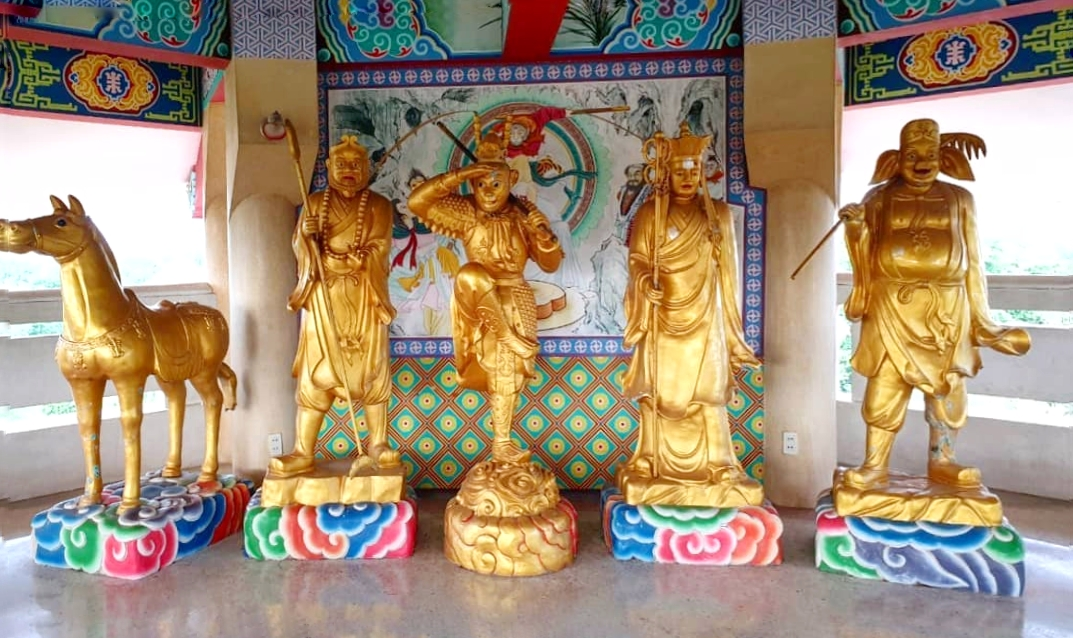
The golden statues of White Dragon Horse, Sha Wujing, Sun Wukong, Tang Sanzang and Zhu Bajie at the Rua Yai City Pillar Shrine in Suphan Buri, Thailand

=== Early theatrical appearances ===
Zhu Bajie first appeared as a pig demon in theatrical plays of the Yuan and early Ming dynasties, including works by Yang Jingxian. In these early versions, the character introduces himself as the "Chariot General" and serves Marici, the Bodhisattva of Light. In Esoteric Buddhism, Marici often has a pig's face and rides a chariot pulled by pigs.

This portrayal may have another influence: Southern Song dynasty political satire mocked invading Jin soldiers as "golden pigs" pulling the chariot of Empress Dowager Meng, a noted devotee of Marici.

=== Evolution of Marshal Tianpeng ===
Zhu Bajie's heavenly title, Marshal Tianpeng, comes from ancient Taoist star worship. Tianpeng was first revered as a supreme war god and was one of the Four Saints of the North Pole. During the Ming dynasty, the deity Zhenwu Dadi was elevated to supreme status, causing a significant decline in Marshal Tianpeng's mythological standing.

Over time, Tianpeng's lore became mixed with Bian Zhuang, a historical warrior from the Spring and Autumn period. Bian Zhuang was known for killing tigers, but he also had a reputation for repeated defeats. This mixing mirrors Zhu Bajie's frequent defeats in the novel, as well as his reliance on Sun Wukong.

The cultural status of Marshal Tianpeng was low in Ming mythology. Wu Cheng'en reflected this lower status by adapting the character as a disgraced deity who was cast out of heaven for harassing the moon goddess Chang'e and then reborn as a pig demon.

== Nine-toothed rake ==
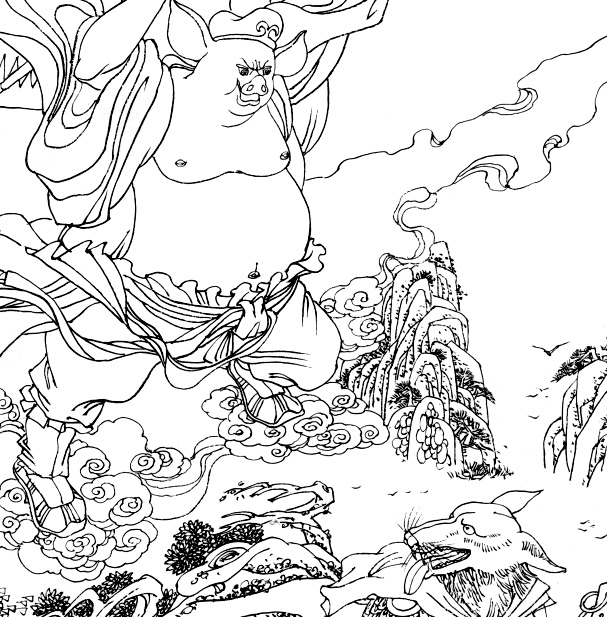
Zhu Bajie slaying demons with his rake

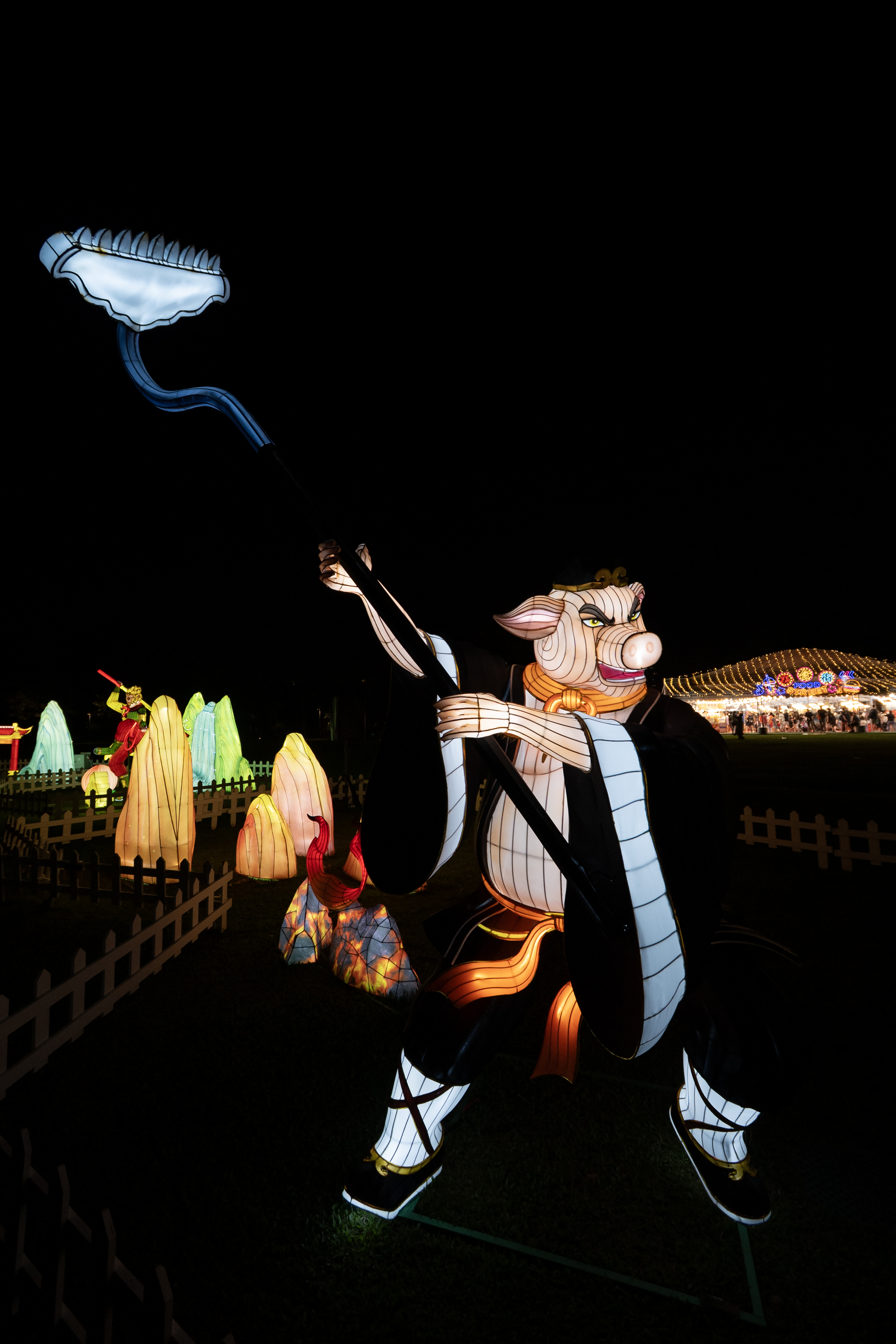
Zhu Bajie wielding his signature weapon, the Nine-Toothed Rake.

The nine-toothed rake (simplified Chinese: 九齿钉耙; traditional Chinese: 九齒釘耙; pinyin: Jiǔchǐdīngpá; Wade–Giles: Chiu^{2}-ch'ih^{3} Ting^{1}-p'a^{2}; lit. 'Nine-Tooth Spike-Rake'), also known as the "Baoqin gold palladium" (寶沁金鈀), is Zhu Bajie's primary weapon. The following passage describes one of the rake's first uses:

The fierce and murderous ogre;
Huian, imposing and able.
The iron staff could pulverize the heart;
The rake struck at the face.
The dust thrown up darkened Heaven and Earth;
The flying sand and stones startled gods and ghouls.
The nine−toothed rake
Gleamed and flashed
As its pair of rings resounded;
The lone staff
Was ominously black
As it whirled in its owner's hands.
One was the heir of a Heavenly King,
One defended the Law on Potaraka Island.
The other was an evil fiend in a mountain cave.
In their battle for mastery,
None knew who the winner would be.

In another passage, Pig describes his legendary rake while battling Sun Wukong:

This was refined from divine ice−iron,
Polished till it gleamed dazzling white,
Hammered by Lord Lao Zi himself,
While Ying Huo fed the fire with coal−dust.
The Five Emperors of the Five Regions applied their minds to it,
The Six Dings and Six jias went to great efforts.
They made nine teeth of jade,
Cast a pair of golden rings to hang beneath them,
Decorated the body with the Six Bright Shiners and the Five planets,
Designed it in accordance with the Four Seasons and the Eight Divisions.
The length of top and bottom match Heaven and Earth.
Positive and Negative were to left and right, dividing the sun and moon.
The Six Divine Generals of the Oracular Lines are there, following the Heavenly Code;
The constellations of the Eight Trigrams are set out in order.
It was named the Supremely Precious Gold−imbued Rake,
And served to guard the gates of the Jade Emperor's palace.
As I had become a great Immortal,
I now enjoyed eternal life,
And was commissioned as Marshal Tian Peng,
With this rake to mark my imperial office.
When I raise it, fire and light stream forth;
When I lower it, a snowy blizzard blows.
It terrifies the Heavenly Generals,
And makes the King of Hell too quake with fear.
There is no other weapon matching it on Earth,
Nor iron to rival it throughout the world.
It changes into anything I like,
And leaps about whenever I say the spell.
For many a year I've carried it around,
Keeping it with me every single day.
I will not put it down even to eat,
Nor do I when I sleep at night.
I took it with me to the Peach Banquet,
And carried it into the celestial court.
When I sinned my sin in drunken pride,
I used it to force compliance with my evil will.
When Heaven sent me down to the mortal dust,
I committed all kinds of wickedness down here.
I used to devour people in this cave,
Until I fell in love and married in Gao Village.
This rake has plunged beneath the sea to stir up dragons,
And climbed high mountains to smash up tigers' dens.
No other blade is worth a mention
Besides my rake, the sharpest weapon ever.
To win a fight with it requires no effort;
Of course it always brings me glory.
Even if you have an iron brain in a brazen head and a body of steel,
This rake will scatter your souls and send your spirit flying.

During the journey, he kills many demons with the rake, often leaving nine wounds.

== Personality ==
=== Merits ===
==== Respectful ====
Despite his former identity as a great marshal in charge of 80,000 celestial marines, Zhu Bajie respectfully calls Sun Wukong "brother", even though the two often clash and Sun frequently mocks him. Another reason is that Zhu Bajie knows Sun's reputation as a powerful fighter from his previous life.

==== Soft-hearted ====
During the journey, many demons disguise themselves as children or beautiful women in distress to deceive the pilgrims and capture Tang Sanzang. Although Sun Wukong can identify demons, Zhu Bajie often persuades him to release them rather than capture or kill them; his kindness often causes trouble and leads to disaster.

==== Optimistic ====
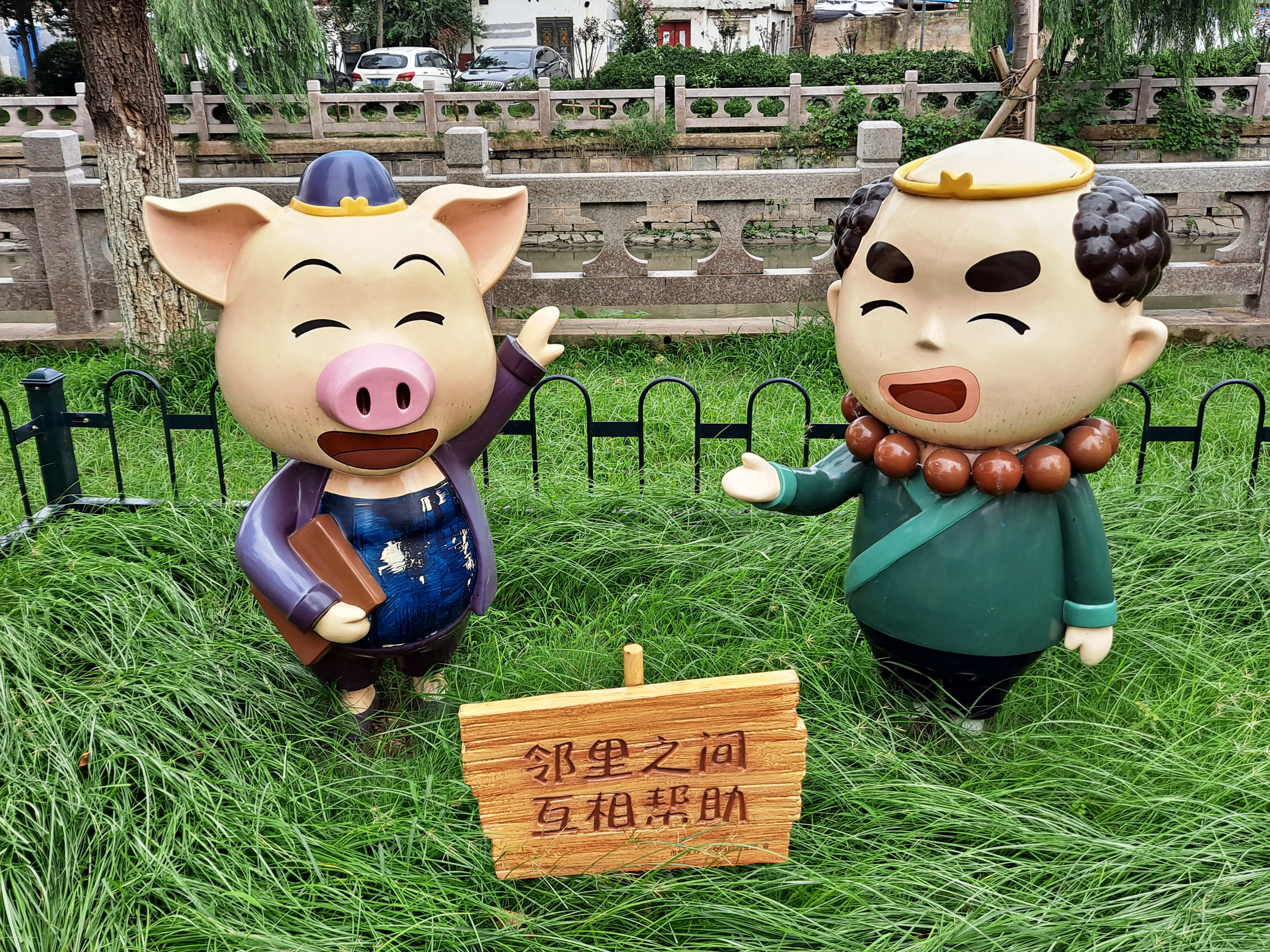
Caricature statues of Zhu Bajie & Sha Wujing on the streets of Lianyungang

Although he is repeatedly captured by demons during the journey, he usually remains composed; even when he is about to be eaten, he appears less anxious than his two companions. This is also related to his background as a marshal in his previous life: his experience in dealing with danger makes his emotions fluctuate less. In some readings of the novel, Zhu Bajie deliberately does not use his full power on the journey because he knows that Monkey King will come and save the group. If Monkey King does not, other deities usually come to help.

=== Demerits ===
==== Gluttony ====
In one part of the book, Zhu Bajie obtains a watermelon and splits it into four equal pieces to share with his companions. After finishing his own slice, he finds the watermelon so delicious that he makes excuses to eat each remaining piece until the whole watermelon is gone. He has a large appetite, which is evident in many parts of the story.

==== Laziness ====
Zhu Bajie is given to laziness. He often neglects the group's troubles and responsibilities, looking for excuses to delay the pilgrimage.

Each time the four pilgrims arrive in another country, local people welcome them with food and lodging because they come from the Great Tang Empire, which was both culturally and economically influential in surrounding areas at the time. Zhu Bajie therefore tends to find excuses to persuade his master to stay several more days for better lodging and food.

==== Lust ====
When he was a marshal in heaven, he dallied with Chang'e, which led to his banishment. After his reincarnation, he is often portrayed as openly lustful when he encounters women. His lust often gets the group into trouble and sometimes leads to disaster. His name, meaning "eight restraints", reminds him to resist temptations of the flesh, including lust, laziness, gluttony, and avarice.

== See also ==
- List of media adaptations of Journey to the West
