= The Husband of the Rat's Daughter =

Japanese fairy tale

The Husband of the Rat's Daughter is a Japanese fairy tale. Andrew Lang included it in The Brown Fairy Book. It is Aarne-Thompson type 2031C, a chain tale or cumulative tale. Another story of this type is The Mouse Turned into a Maid.

== Synopsis ==
Two rats had a remarkably beautiful daughter. In some variants, the father would have been happy to marry her to a rat of finer family, but the mother did not want her daughter to marry a mere rat; in others, they both agreed that she must marry the greatest being in the world. They offered her to the sun, telling him they wanted a son-in-law who was greater than all. The sun told them that he could not take advantage of their ignorance: the cloud, which blotted out his face, was greater. So they asked the cloud instead. The cloud told them that the wind freely blew it about. They asked the wind. The wind told them that the wall could easily stop it. They asked the wall. The wall told them that a rat could reduce it to powder with its teeth. So they married her to a rat.

== See also ==
- The Stonecutter
