= W. R. van Hoëvell =

Dutch churchman, politician, anti-colonial reformer, writer

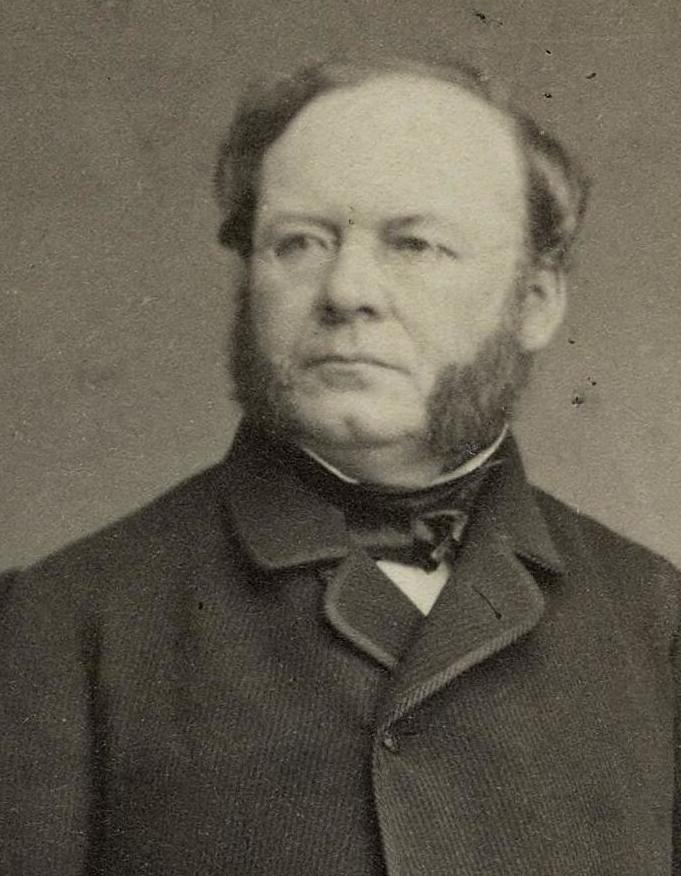
Wolter Robert van Hoëvell (1863)

Wolter Robert Baron van Hoëvell (14 July 1812 – 10 February 1879) was a Dutch minister, politician, reformer, and writer. Born into nobility and trained in the Dutch Reformed Church, he worked for eleven years as a minister in the Dutch East Indies. He led a Malay-speaking congregation, engaged in scholarly research and cultural activities, and became an outspoken critic of Dutch colonialism. His activism culminated when he acted as one of the leaders of a short-lived protest in 1848. During the event, a multi-ethnic group of Batavian inhabitants presented their grievances to the local government. As a result of his leadership in the protest, van Hoëvell was forced to resign his position in the Indies.

After his return to the Netherlands, he served as a member of parliament for the Dutch Liberal party from 1849 to 1862, and from 1862 until his death he was a member of the State Council. He used his political position to continue critiquing the Dutch colonial system; nicknamed "chief of the colonial opposition", he was the first Dutch politician to do so eloquently and knowledgeably, and inspired writers such as Multatuli.

== Biography ==
=== Youth ===
Van Hoëvell was born in Deventer to one of the last of the old noble families in the Netherlands. His parents were Gerrit Willem Wolter Carel, Baron van Höevell (born Deventer, 21 April 1778), and Emerentia Luthera Isabella, Baroness van der Capellen (born Haarlem, 31 August 1787); he grew up with six brothers and sisters. While van Hoëvell was still young, the family moved to Groningen where he attended Latin school. Van Hoëvell enrolled in the University of Groningen in 1829 and studied theology. In 1830, he saw military action in Belgium during the abortive attempt by the North-Netherlands to maintain the unity of the United Kingdom of the Netherlands. He returned from the war gravely ill, but recovered and then returned to the university. He graduated summa cum laude with a dissertation on Irenaeus in 1836, and in that same year married Abrahamina Johanna Trip, with whom he had two daughters and four sons; one daughter and one son died young.

=== Ministry and activism in Dutch East Indies ===
Van Hoëvell left the Netherlands to become a minister in Batavia in the Dutch East Indies, where he led a Malay and Dutch-speaking congregation. In 1838, he received an additional appointment, as historian for the local government, and began traveling throughout the area. He worked in the East Indies until 1848, when he received an official reprimand from the Dutch government for publicizing his views critical of colonialism; consequently he was forced to resign.

==== 1848 protest ====
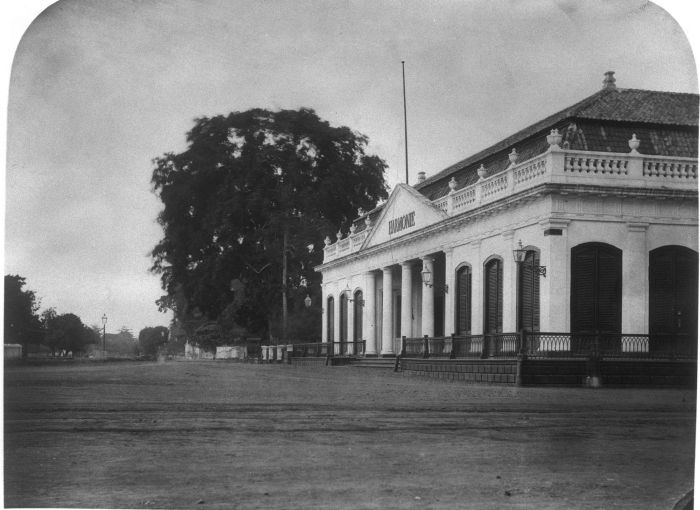
De Harmonie, Batavia, c. 1870.

Van Hoëvell played an important part in the short-lived protest in Batavia that has been called the "1848 Batavian Revolution". Partly inspired by the February 1848 uprising in Paris, Batavian citizens began to challenge the authorities; one of their grievances was an 1842 decree that dictated that positions in the upper echelons of the Dutch administration could be held only by those who had received the appropriate certificate from the Royal Academy in Delft. The measure discriminated against both "Dutch-born and creole Dutch" who could not or did not want to send their children to the Netherlands for a decade of education. The measure also discriminated against the class referred to as Indo-Europeans, who were thus barred from promotion above the level of "the lowliest civil service jobs." As a consequence of this discrimination across racial barriers, the May 1848 protest could draw a mixed group of citizens, "identified as 'Europeans,' 'creoles,' and 'colored'" by the authorities.

Van Hoëvell emerged as one of the "principal organizers" in the protest and called a meeting, with official approval, to discuss "better access to government jobs for locally born colonizers through expanded educational offerings". Starting on 17 May, van Hoëvell and others met many times with Governor-General Jan Jacob Rochussen to discuss what kind of meeting was to be held and what demands would be made. During this time, van Hoëvell was able to move the proposed meeting place from a private residence to the central hall of De Harmonie, the club house of the Batavian citizen's society, and he organized transportation for whoever wished to come, including his own congregation.

The organizers received permission from Rochussen for their meeting since they had argued that their grievances were social matters, not "matters of state," and that they did not form a political threat to the government. However, on 20 May van Hoëvell printed the kind of anti-government rhetoric he had been asked to refrain from in a journal he published. There were also signals at other public events of growing unease among the locally born Dutch population as well as the large Indo-European population, who had held protests of their own and delivered a petition to Rochussen. Taking all these developments in consideration, Rochussen concluded that the meeting in De Harmonie should be considered subversive and a danger to the state; he let it be known that armed troops were ready to take control of the situation if need be. At 6 PM on 22 May, people were flocking to the club house, and by 7 PM it was packed. Van Hoëvell was quickly proclaimed to be president of the assembly. Soon after, though, the meeting became unruly and the shouts of a few led to a riot. In an increasingly unruly atmosphere, the protestors ousted van Hoëvell from his presidency as quickly as they had raised him to the position, after which he and others left the building. The protest fizzled out soon afterward.

==== Resignation ====
By mid-1848, van Hoëvell had become too controversial and perhaps too important to those who disagreed with the local government, and under pressure from the Governor-General he resigned his post on 19 July 1848. After a packed final service in the Willemskerk in August, he was sent off by "half the population of Batavia"; his final sermon, based on Epistle to the Hebrews 13:18–19, suggested that he hoped to return to the Indies. Later, he characterized the Governor-General as more powerful than the Dutch king: "he is the sun, at which all eyes are aimed; when he laughs, everyone laughs; if he looks serious, then the entire multitude frowns its face."

==== Scholarship and other activities in the Indies ====
In Batavia, he was an active scholar, publishing on linguistics, language, and history. In 1838 he founded a journal, Tijdschrift voor Nederlandsch-Indië ("Journal for the Dutch East Indies"), which he edited until 1862, and he edited and translated a fourteenth-century romantic poem written in the Jawi alphabet, the Syair Bidasari. He was chairman of the Batavian Society of Arts and Sciences and its president after 1845, and published a book on the colony's arts and sciences and one on the colony's history. Van Hoëvell traveled widely, studied languages and artifacts, and visited local Muslim rulers; he judged the threat of Islam to be much less insidious than the restrictions from the Dutch government or the danger posed by domestic Catholics. He was awarded with knighthood in the Order of the Netherlands Lion in 1847.

He became a friend and correspondent of Eduard Douwes Dekker, who under the pseudonym Multatuli published Max Havelaar, the 1860 satire that exposed colonial corruption in Java; Dekker was one of the first subscribers to Tijdschrift voor Nederlandsch-Indië. Another acquaintance was W. Bosch, chief of the public health services in the colony, who had written critically on the effects of the colonial system on the health of the population, arguing to his superiors that they should help combat poverty, malnourishment, and communicable diseases. Bosch had provided logistical assistance during the events of May 1848, and they remained friends even after van Hoëvell returned to the Netherlands.

=== Return to the Netherlands: political career ===
While Rochussen had been glad to see him go, back in the Netherlands van Hoëvell fared better politically. He was vindicated when the government canceled the acceptance of his forced resignation, and he was cleared of any wrongdoing in the events of May 1848. The publication of the Tijdschrift voor Nederlandsch-Indië, which had stopped at his expulsion from Batavia, was resumed in 1849, now in a less repressive environment. For some pamphlets, he used the pseudonym Jeronymus. In September 1849, he was elected to the House of Representatives of the Netherlands for the Liberal party and he remained a member of parliament until 1862. He was one of only a handful of Dutch parliamentarians who had actually been to the East Indies, and often spoke eloquently on colonial matters in parliament. He became "one of the most ferocious critics" of the Cultivation System, the government-run system (already criticized by W. Bosch and others) that demanded that the local peasantry set aside a significant portion of their land to grow crops for the Dutch to export. Van Hoëvell was a proponent of private ownership, and argued that the system, besides being immoral, was also economically ineffective. His criticism of Dutch colonial practices extended to the Dutch West India Company; he was a supporter of abolitionism at a time when Dutch colonists owned tens of thousands of slaves, mainly on plantations in Surinam.

In parliament, he continued what had become his mission: to educate the Dutch citizenry on the nature of Dutch colonialism. In his speeches, he occasionally used confidential government information sent to him from the Indies by his friend Bosch. With great expertise and sometimes "disturbing eloquence" he criticized the Dutch government for generating millions from the colonies while denying the locals "education, Christianity, and the blessings of progress".

In 1860, he was one of those politicians who forced Prime Minister and Minister of Colonial Affairs Jan Jacob Rochussen, his former Governor-General, to resign his post, in part because a corruption scandal in the East Indies came to light. In that same year he promoted his friend Multatuli's Max Havelaar, announcing in parliament that the book had sent tremors through the country. On 1 July 1862, he was appointed to the Council of State of the Netherlands, where he served until his death in The Hague on 10 February 1879. His wife died on 9 January 1888.

== Legacy ==
Van Hoëvell, deemed a "radical" for his opinions, stands alongside Dirk van Hogendorp as one of the most important and best-known Dutch anti-colonialists of the nineteenth century before Multatuli—he is regarded as one of Multatuli's predecessors. He was a passionate man, who felt it his duty to inform the Dutch citizenry of the arrogance of the Dutch colonial rulers, the widespread corruption among the native ruling classes, and the imposition of backbreaking labor on the local peasantry. Moreover, according to van Hoëvell, the colonial system harmed relationships between peoples. These were themes that were also discussed by Multatuli in his Max Havelaar. Van Hoëvell's efforts to abolish slavery, especially his 1854 book Slaves and free people under Dutch law, are credited with having hastened the emancipation of Dutch-owned slaves in the East Indies in 1859 and in the West Indies in 1863. The book is included in the Canon of Dutch Literature.

== Publications ==
- Geschiedkundig overzicht van de beoefening van kunsten en wetenschappen in Nederlands-Indië ("History of the practice of arts and sciences in the Dutch East Indies"). 1839.
- Episode uit de geschiedenis van Neerlands-Indië ("Episode from the history of the Dutch East Indies"). 1840.
- Sjaïr Bidasari. Oorspronkelijk Maleisch gedicht met een vertaling en aanteekeningen ("Originally Malay poem with translation and notes"). Batavia, 1844.
- Beschuldiging en veroordeling in Indië en rechtvaardiging in Nederland ("Accusation and condemnation in the Indies and justification in the Netherlands"). 1850
- De drukpers en de Javanen ("The printing press and the Javanese"). 1851.
- Slaven en vrijen onder de Nederlandsche wet ("Slaves and free people under Dutch law"). 1854.
- Reis over Java, Madura en Bali in het midden van 1847 ("A journey across Java, Madura, and Bali in mid-1847"). 1850.
- Uit het Indische leven ("From life in the Indies"). 1860. Second edition printed in 1865.

== See also ==
- Dutch Indies literature
