= The Dog and the Sheep =

Aesop's fable

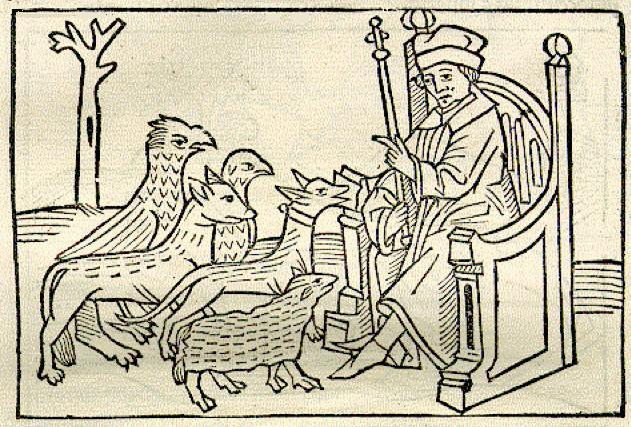
A German woodcut of Aesop's fable showing the litigants before a judge, 1501

The Dog and the Sheep is one of Aesop's Fables and is numbered 478 in the Perry Index. Originally its subject was the consequence of bearing false witness. However, longer treatments of the story during the Middle Ages change the focus to deal with perversions of justice by the powerful at the expense of the poor. It has sometimes been alternatively titled The Wolf, the Dog and the Sheep in order to distinguish it from the fable of the dispute between the sheep and the dog that guards them (Perry 356).

== A change of focus ==
The fable as originally told by Phaedrus records the fate reserved to liars. A dog took a sheep to law over a loaf that he claimed to have given it and was supported by a wolf called as witness. Though the sheep lost the case, it later came across the wolf dead in a ditch and drew the moral that this was as a result of heavenly punishment.

After the social breakdown of the Middle Ages, the fable's focus changed to misuse of justice and the fate of the poor in the many Latin versions recording it. Walter of England's fable is much grimmer. The dog is supported in his accusation by three false witnesses, the kite, vulture and wolf, and the sheep has to cover the cost by selling its wool in mid-winter. Nor does any heavenly punishment follow. The moral is simply that this is the way of the world:

Sepe fidem falso mendicat inertia teste,
Sepe dolet pietas criminis arte capi

("Often laziness begs faith in false witness, often justice is the captive of criminal deceit"). Indeed, in the slightly later French version of Marie de France, it is the lamb that dies of cold. This had always been the intention of its carnivorous false accusers, the wolf, the kite and the dog, who then divide its body between them.

Marie de France's poem comprises 42 octosyllabic lines, of which the last eight provide a commentary on how law has been corrupted by the powerful to oppress the poor. During the course of the 15th century two more authors used the fable to comment at even greater length on this social abuse still needing redress. The poems were the work of the Chaucerian poets John Lydgate and Robert Henryson, both of whom composed short collections of Aesop's fables, using decasyllabic rhyme royal. Lydgate's The Tale of the Hownde and the Shepe, groundyd agen perjuré and false wytnes comprises 32 of these seven-line stanzas, of which some sixteen are devoted to a denunciation of perjury and greed. The story itself is told with satirical intent, with its introduction of the false witnesses as "The faithful wolf, in trowth that doth delite,/ And with hym comyth the gentil foule, the kyte". As in Marie de France, the sheep perishes and is divided between its accusers.

Henryson had trained in law and many of the 25 stanzas of his Taill of the Scheip and the Doig are devoted to a description of the legal process in the Scotland of his day. Here the wolf plays the part of judge, the raven is the summoner, while the kite and the vulture are lawyers. The unrepresented sheep is browbeaten into forfeiting its wool to compensate the dog but survives to utter his complaint to Heaven:

Now few, or none, will justice execute,
And rich men aye the poor will overthrow.
And truth itself, even when judges know,
Will be ignored, some profit for to win.

The fable continued to be related in the Renaissance as an exemplary story even after reforms in the law. Hieronymus Osius devoted a short Neo-Latin poem to it in which the sheep is dunned for "certain measures of wheat", as Roger L'Estrange termed it in his own prose version of 1692. John Ogilby and Samuel Croxall returned to the more violent ending in their versions, where the dog tears the sheep to pieces at the end of the legal process to divide between his confederates. Besides offering the usual conclusions in his 'application', Croxall – with the long struggle against Stuart misrule in mind – goes on to comment that "it is hard to determine which resemble Brutes most, they in acting or the People in suffering them to act their vile, selfish Schemes."

The Russian fabulist Ivan Krylov made substantial changes to the original version of Phaedrus in his fable of "The Peasant and the Sheep". In particular he adapted the story to satirise his own time and country and, like Henryson before him, put particular emphasis on detailing legal language and process. In this case a peasant takes a sheep to court, accusing it of having eaten two of his fowls. The judge is a fox (or a wolf in the earlier version), who refuses to believe the sheep's plea that it is not an eater of such delicious fare. The sheep is therefore condemned to death; its flesh is reserved for the court's use and its pelt is awarded to the peasant. In a time of strict censorship, Krylov did not bother to draw a moral; the manifest absurdity of the proceedings makes its own point. The poem was later set as a song by Alexander Gretchaninov among his "Fables After Ivan Krylov".

== Comparison of versions ==
Source	Title	Characters	Charge	Fate of sheep	Moral
Phaedrus (1st century CE)	The sheep, the dog and the wolf (ovis, canis et lupus)	Sheep (defendant), Dog (accuser), Wolf (witness)	Restitution for a loaf that was lent	Condemned to repay	"Thus liars are repaid," on the lamb seeing the dead wolf
Ademar of Chabannes (early 11th century)	Of the dog and the sheep (de cane et ove)	Sheep (defendant), Dog (accuser), Wolf, Kite and Hawk (witnesses), Judge	Restitution for a loaf that was lent	Shorn of wool in payment	"Law is undermined to oppress and harm the innocent"
Walter of England (c. 1175)	Of the dog and the sheep (de cane et ove)	Sheep (defendant), Dog (accuser), Kite, Vulture and Wolf (witnesses)	Restitution for a loaf that was lent	Shorn of wool in winter	"Often laziness begs faith in false witness, justice is the captive of criminal deceit"
Marie de France (c. 1190)	De cane et ove	Sheep (defendant), Dog (accuser), Wolf and Kite (witnesses), Judge	Restitution for a loaf that was lent	Shorn for payment, it dies of cold and its body is shared between dog, wolf and kite	Many will bear false witness to rob the poor
John Lydgate (c. 1400)	The Tale of the Hownde and the Shepe	Sheep (defendant), Hound (accuser), Wolf and Kite (witnesses), Judge	Restitution for a loaf that was lent	Shorn for payment, it dies of cold and its body is shared between dog, wolf and kite	Bearing false witness leads to damnation
Robert Henryson (1480s)	The Taill of the Scheip and the Doig	Sheep (defendant), Dog (accuser), Wolf (judge), Fox (notary), Raven (summoner), Kite and Vulture (lawyers), Bear and Badger (arbiters)	Restitution for a loaf that was lent	Shorn for payment in mid-winter	Avarice makes criminals of the rich and truth is ignored
William Caxton (1484)	Of the dogge and of the sheep	Sheep (defendant), Dog (accuser), Wolf, Kite and Sparrowhawk (witnesses), Judge	Restitution for a loaf that was lent	Shorn for payment as winter approached	Evil folk despoil the poor with untruth and malice
John Ogilby (1665)	Of the Dog and the Sheep	Sheep (defendant), Dog (accuser), Fox, Kite and Vulture (witnesses), Judge	Restitution for a loaf that was lent	Heart eaten by dog, then body quartered between witnesses	Where witnesses can be bought, "Men of small Conscience little fear the Laws"
Roger L'Estrange (1692)	A dog, a sheep and a wolf	Sheep (defendant), Dog (accuser), Wolf, Kite and Vulture (witnesses)	Restitution for "certain measures of wheat"	Shorn for payment	"'Tis no small matter where the Bench, Jury and Witnesses are in a Conspiracy against the Prisoner"
Samuel Croxall (1722)	The dog and the sheep	Sheep (defendant), Dog (accuser), Kite and Wolf (judges)	Sued for debt	Torn to pieces and shared with the judges	The brutishness of malefactors is equalled by those who allow them to act thus
Ivan Krylov (1823)	The peasant and the sheep	Sheep (defendant), Peasant (accuser), Fox (judge)	Accused of eating two chickens	Executed and divided between judge and plaintiff	(Satirical lack of comment)
