= The Fisherman and His Wife =

German fairy tale

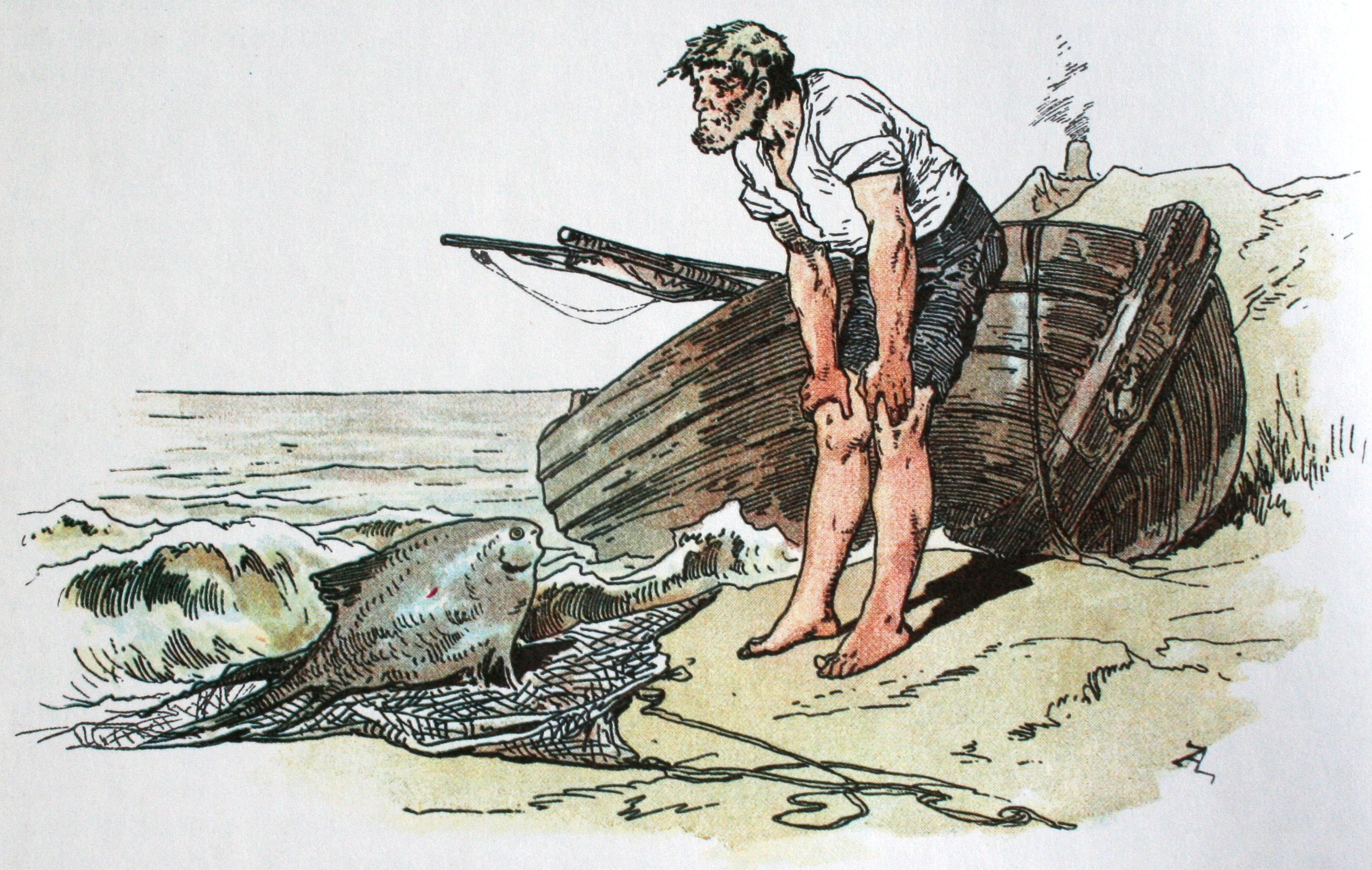
- "The Fisherman and His Wife" illustration by Alexander Zick

Folk tale
- Name: The Fisherman and His Wife
- Aarne–Thompson grouping: ATU 555
- Country: Germany
- Published in: Grimm's Fairy Tales

"The Fisherman and His Wife" (Low German: Von dem Fischer un syner Fru) is a German fairy tale collected by the Brothers Grimm in 1812 (KHM 19). The tale is of Aarne–Thompson type 555, about dissatisfaction and greed. It may be classified as an anti-fairy tale.

== Origin ==
The tale was published by the Brothers Grimm in the first edition of Kinder- und Hausmärchen in 1812 as tale no. 19. Their source was the German painter Philipp Otto Runge (1777–1810), from whom the Grimms obtained a manuscript of the tale in 1809. Johann Gustav Büsching published another version of Runge's manuscript a few months earlier in 1812 in Volkssagen, Märchen und Legenden, with some discrepancies with the Grimms' version.

== Synopsis ==
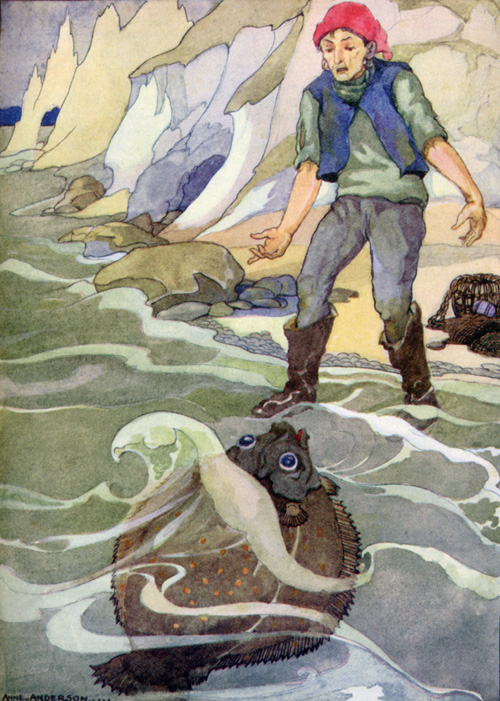
Illustration by Anne Anderson

A poor fisherman lives with his wife in a hovel by the sea. One day the fisherman catches a fish who claims to be able to grant wishes and begs to be set free. The fisherman kindly releases it. When his wife hears the story, she says he ought to have had the fish grant him a wish. She insists that he go back and ask the turbot to grant her wish for a nicer house.

The fisherman reluctantly returns to the shore but is uneasy when he finds that the sea seems to become turbid, as it was so clear before. He makes up a rhyme to summon the turbot, and it grants the wife's wish. The fisherman is pleased with his new wealth, but the wife is not and demands more, and demands that her husband go back and wish for a palace. Reluctantly, he does and gets his wish. But again and again, his wife sends him back to ask for more and more; she then asks for him to be made King, then to be made Emperor, then to be made Pope. Each time, the fisherman knows this is wrong but there is no reasoning with his wife. He says they should not annoy the turbot, and be content with what they have been given, but his wife is not content. Each time, the turbot grants the wishes with the words: "just go home again, she has it already" or similar, but each time the sea grows rougher and rougher.

Eventually, the wife wishes to command the sun, moon, and heavens, and she sends her husband to the turbot with the wish "I want to become equal to God". The turbot just tells the fisherman to go home, stating that "she is sitting in her old hovel again". And with that, the sea becomes calm once more, and the fisherman and his wife are once more living in nothing but their old, dirty hovel.

== Variants ==
The "Fisherman and His Wife" is similar to other AT-555 tales such as the German "Hanns Dudeldee", the Russian "The Old Man, His Wife, and the Fish", the Japanese "The Stonecutter", and the Indian "The Bullock's Balls".

French author Édouard Laboulaye published a literary reworking of an Estonian tale titled The Fairy Crawfish. In this tale, poor fisherman Loppi finds a magical crawfish that can grant all his wishes. Loppi is satisfied with very little, but his nagging wife Masica is always asking more and more things from the crawfish.

In "British Folk Tales and Legends a Sampler" Katherine Briggs pp. 40–43 noted a British variant collected in 1924 called 'The Old Woman who Lived in a Vinegar Bottle' with a magical fairy rather than a fish. This was also the title of Rumer Godden's 1972 re-telling, based upon a family tradition of story-telling. Brigg's notes that over 41 Irish versions have been given in "Bealoideas XIV pp.273.

The Icelandic folktale variant "My Old Woman Must be Paid" features an elf named Kidhus who had a reputation for thievery among the local human population. When he stole a golden ball used by a fisherman's wife as a spindle whorl, her husband demanded that Kidhus give him an object of equal value as compensation (which he granted). The couple became greedy and asked for more and more items until they asked Kidhus for a ladder so high that it would reach all the way to Heaven. Kidhus granted their request but when the fisherman and his wife climbed the ladder they lost their balance and fell to their deaths.

== Cultural legacy ==
Its theme was used in The Tale of the Fisherman and the Fish, an 1833 poem by Aleksandr Pushkin. Virginia Woolf has her character Mrs. Ramsay in To the Lighthouse read a version of the story to her son, James. Günter Grass's 1977 novel The Flounder is loosely based on the fairy tale, as are Emanuele Luzzati's version Punch and the Magic Fish. and Ursula LeGuin's novel The Lathe of Heaven.

A short cartoon based on this story was part of the American animated television series The Rocky and Bullwinkle Show. The turbot was replaced by a beautiful mermaid who grants the wishes in exchange for her freedom. Additionally, the wife goes directly from queen to wishing to be a "goddess". The mermaid points out to the fisherman that all his wishes have been for his wife and asks him what he desires. The fisherman replies that he just wants his wife to be happy, and the mermaid replies: "Go; she is happy." As in the later 1997 version, the fisherman and his wife are reduced to living in their hovel, but the wife is happy that it is poor yet neat.

In 1997, the story was given a Spanish-flavored adaptation on the animated TV series Happily Ever After: Fairy Tales for Every Child. Edward James Olmos and Julia Migenes provided the voices of the fisherman and his wife. In this version, the fisherman is unable to figure out what his last wish is, and says: "I want only for my wife to be happy". Immediately, he and his wife are reduced to living in the hovel again. She is content and happily embraces him.

An episode of the Disney TV cartoon Timon and Pumbaa titled "Be More Pacific" is based on this story, with Pumbaa's role paralleling the fisherman's, and Timon's role paralleling the wife's. Pumbaa finds and rescues a magical whale named Lester, who grants him three wishes. Pumbaa asks for nothing for himself, but he does relay Timon's wishes to Lester. First Timon wishes for "something big and expensive" and is given the Statue of Liberty. Then he wishes to be a king and is transformed into a giant. Lastly he wishes to be "a regular-sized king in a stone castle with a ferocious fire-breathing monster that he can defeat", but Pumbaa gets the message wrong and says "can't" instead of "can". The ferocious monster turns out to be a fire-breathing chicken (instead of the dragon that Timon actually meant), and after Timon and Pumbaa several futile attempts to defeat and escape it, the episode ends with Timon searching for another wish-granting fish while Pumbaa struggles to hold down the trapdoor separating them from the monster.

== See also ==
- The Gold-Children
