= Tijdschrift voor Nederlandsch-Indië =

Dutch magazine

The Tijdschrift voor Nederlandsch-Indië ("Journal of the East Indies") was a magazine in Dutch founded in 1838 by W. R. van Hoëvell, a Dutch minister working in Batavia, in the Dutch East Indies, in the 1830s and 1840s. The magazine published scientific studies on topics such as geography, linguistics, and the Dutch Cultivation System, as well as articles on more popular and political matters. The magazine ceased to be published temporarily when Van Hoëvell was expelled from his post; he resumed publication on his return in 1849 and edited it until 1862. The magazine ceased to exist in 1894.
