= The Mouse Turned into a Maid =

Fable

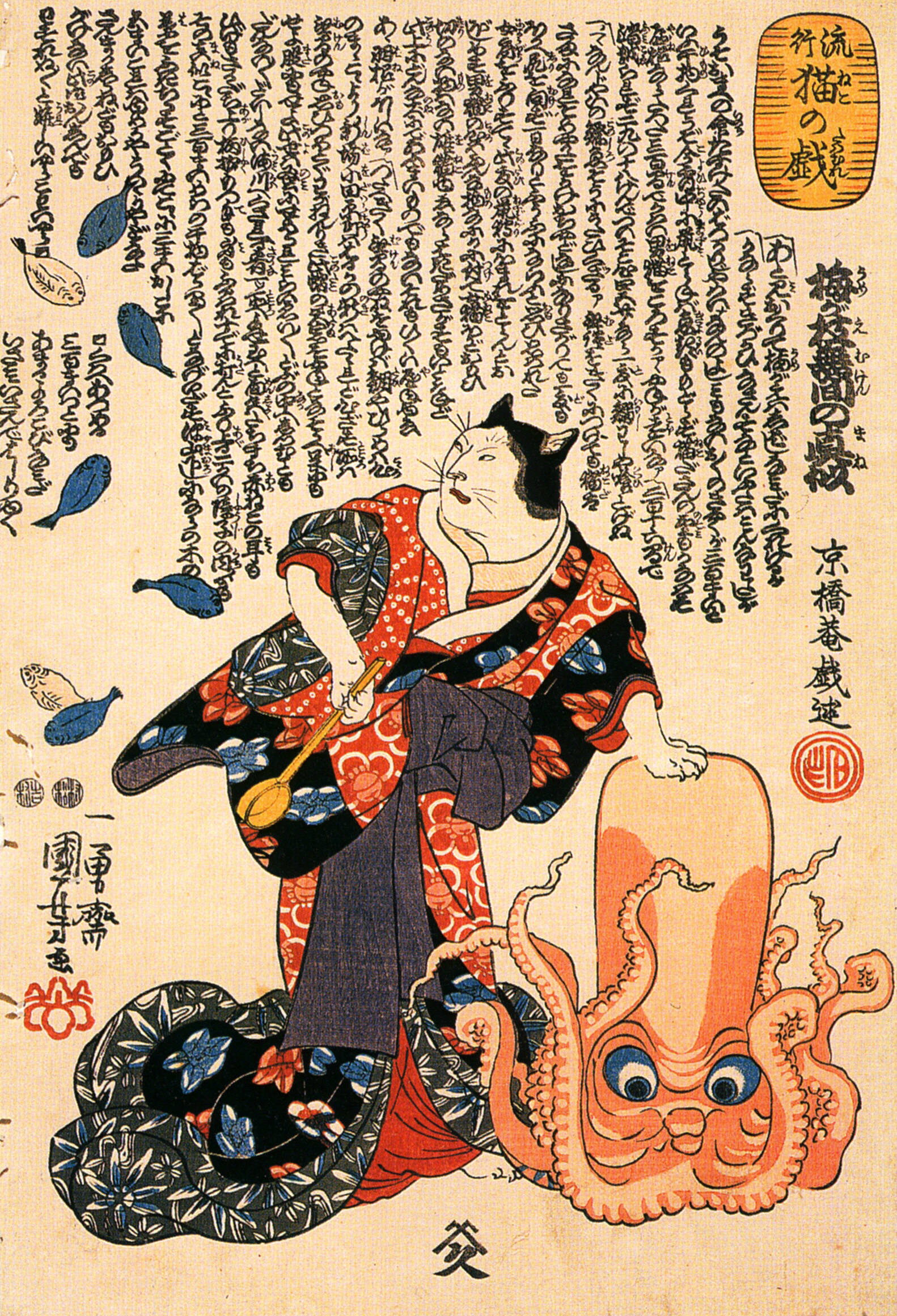
Utagawa Kuniyoshi's "Cat Dressed as a Woman" (a parody of a kabuki scene)

The Mouse Turned into a Maid is an ancient fable of Indian origin that travelled westwards to Europe during the Middle Ages and also exists in the Far East. The story is Aarne-Thompson type 2031C in his list of cumulative tales, another example of which is The Husband of the Rat's Daughter. It concerns a search for a partner through a succession of more powerful forces, resolved only by choosing an equal.

The fable’s classical analogue is Aesop's fable of "Venus and the Cat", in which a man appeals to the goddess Venus to change his cat into a woman. This fable has the themes of incomplete transformation and the impossibility of changing character. It has received many treatments in literature, folklore and the arts.

== The Mouse-Maid Made Mouse ==
The story found in the Panchatantra relates how a mouse drops from the beak of a bird of prey into the hands of a holy man, who turns it into a girl and brings her up as his own. Eventually he seeks a powerful marriage for her but discovers at each application that there is one more powerful: thus the cloud can cover the sun, the wind blows the clouds about but is resisted by the mountain; the mountain, however, is penetrated by mice. Since the girl feels the call of like to like in this case, she is changed back to her original form and goes to live with her husband in his hole.

A variant of the tale appears among the Folk-Tales of Bengal under the name "The Origin of Opium". There, a holy man grants a mouse's successive wishes to become more than itself until it is changed into a woman fair enough to catch a king's eye. When she dies soon after in an accident, a mood-changing opium plant grows from her burial place.

The ancient Indian fable was eventually translated into Pahlavi and then into Arabic, but before a version of any of these works had reached Europe the fable appeared in Marie de France's Ysopet as a cautionary tale against social climbing through marrying above one's station. The creature involved is an ambitious field mouse who applies to the sun for the hand of his daughter. He is sent on to a cloud, the wind, a tower, and then the mouse that undermines it, to the humbling of his aspirations.

The theme of keeping to one's class reappears in a Romanian folk variant in which a rat sets out to pay God a visit. He applies to the sun and to clouds for directions, but neither will answer such a creature; then he asks the wind, which picks him up and flings him on an ant-heap - 'and there he found his level', the story concludes. A less harsh judgement is exhibited in Japanese and Korean variants where the father seeking a powerful match for his daughter is sent round the traditional characters of sun, cloud and wind, only to discover that he too has his place on the ladder of power. All these are animal fables that lack the transformation theme. In the Japanese case a rat is involved and in the Korean a mole.

The later version in La Fontaine's Fables, "The Mouse Metamorphosed into a Maid" (IX.7), acknowledges the story's Indian origin by making it a Brahmin who fosters the mouse and gives it back the body it had in a former birth. La Fontaine feigns shock at all this and finds at the story's culmination, in which the girl falls in love with the burrowing rat at the mere mention of its name, an argument to confound the Eastern fabulist's beliefs:

In all respects, compared and weigh'd,
The souls of men and souls of mice
Quite different are made -
Unlike in sort as well as size.
Each fits and fills its destined part
As Heaven doth well provide;
Nor witch, nor fiend, nor magic art,
Can set their laws aside.

The fable’s philosophical theme inspired the American poet Marianne Moore to a wry and idiosyncratic recreation in her version of La Fontaine (1954):

We are what we were at birth, and each trait has remained
in conformity with earth's and with heaven's logic:
Be the devil's tool, resort to black magic,
None can diverge from the ends which Heaven foreordained.

This in turn was set for unaccompanied soprano by the British composer Alexander Goehr in 1992 (Opus 54).

== Venus and the Cat ==
The Indian fable's western equivalent is the story of "Venus (or Aphrodite) and the Cat", which goes back to Classical times and is given the moral that nature is stronger than nurture. It figures as number 50 in the Perry Index and its many versions feature a cat turned into a woman by the goddess, who then tests her on the wedding night by introducing a mouse into the bedchamber. In the Greek version by Babrius, however, it is a weasel (γαλῆ) that falls in love with a man and begs Aphrodite to change her into a human, but then goes chasing after a mouse in the middle of the marriage feast. In ancient times it was speculated that the Greek proverb ‘a saffron (wedding) robe does not suit a weasel’ was connected with the fable and has much the same meaning that one’s underlying nature does not change with circumstances.
