= Tang Sanzang =

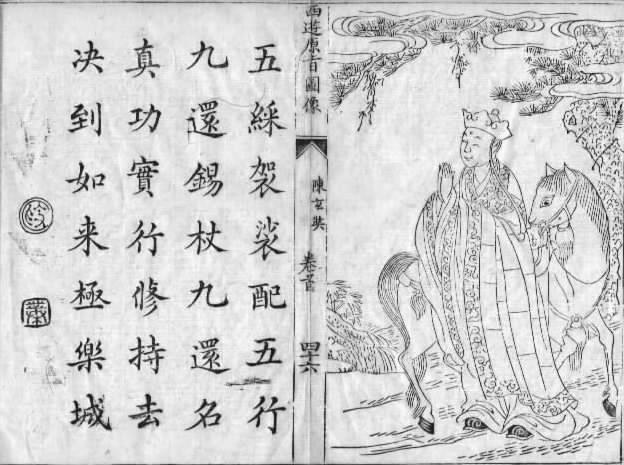
- Depiction of Tang Sanzang
- First appearance: Journey to the West
- Created by: Wu Cheng'en
- Based on: Xuanzang

In-universe information
- Aliases: Tripitaka; Tang Seng
- Species: Human
- Gender: Male
- Title: Buddha of Sandalwood Merit
- Occupation: Buddhist monk
- Affiliation: Sangha
- Religion: Mahayana Buddhism
- Nationality: Chinese

Tang Sanzang
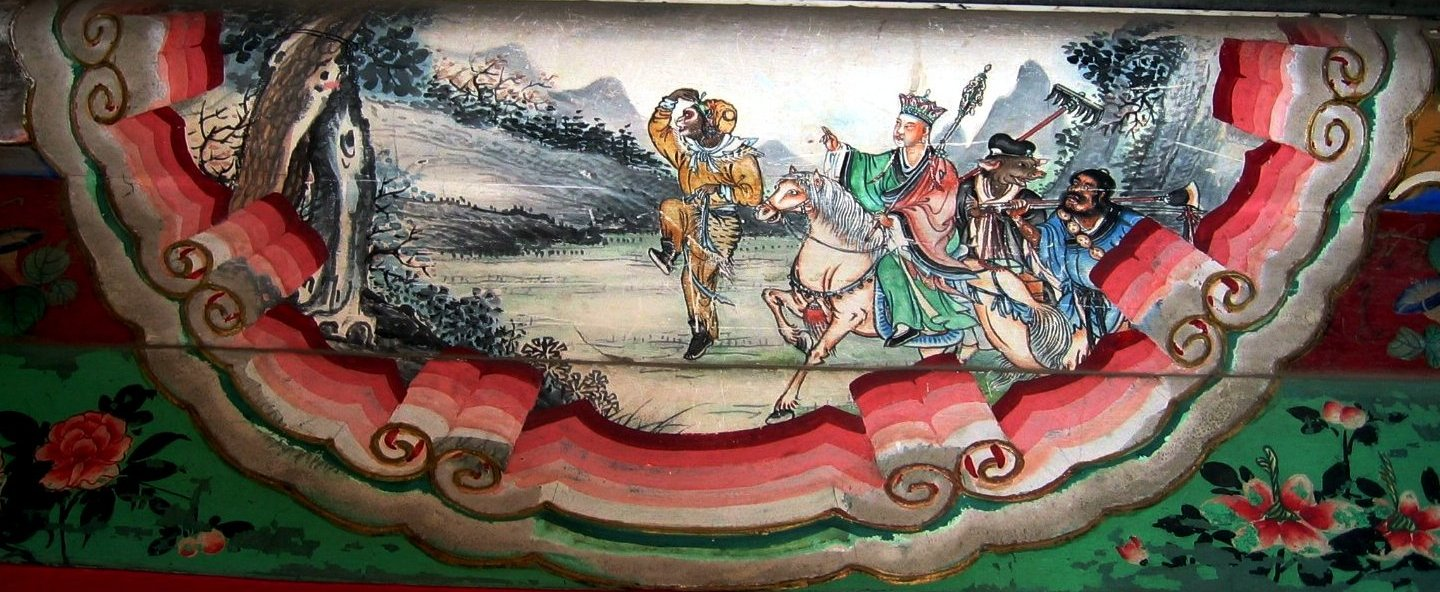
- The four heroes of Journey to the West, Tang Sanzang on the second from the left, riding on Yulong. Painted decoration in the Long Corridor at the Summer Palace in Beijing, China

Chinese name
- Chinese: 唐三藏
- Literal meaning: three collections
Transcriptions
Standard Mandarin
- Hanyu Pinyin: Táng Sānzàng
- Wade–Giles: Tang^{2} San^{1}-tsang^{4}
Yue: Cantonese
- Jyutping: Tong4 Saam1 Zong6
Southern Min
- Hokkien POJ: Tông Sam-chōng

Xuanzang
- Chinese: 玄奘
Transcriptions
Standard Mandarin
- Hanyu Pinyin: Xuánzàng
- Wade–Giles: Hsüan^{2}-tsang^{4}

Tripitaka
- Traditional Chinese: 三藏經
- Simplified Chinese: 三藏经
Transcriptions
Standard Mandarin
- Hanyu Pinyin: Sānzàngjīng
- Wade–Giles: San1-tsang4-ching1
Yue: Cantonese
- Jyutping: Saam1 Zong6 Ging1

Tang Seng
- Chinese: 唐僧
- Literal meaning: Tang Monk
Transcriptions
Standard Mandarin
- Hanyu Pinyin: Táng Sēng
Yue: Cantonese
- Jyutping: Tong4 Zang1

Buddha of Sandalwood Merit
- Chinese: 旃檀功德佛
- Literal meaning: Buddha of Sandalwood Merit
Transcriptions
Standard Mandarin
- Hanyu Pinyin: Zhāntán gōngdé Fó

River Float
- Chinese: 江流
- Literal meaning: River Float
Transcriptions
Standard Mandarin
- Hanyu Pinyin: Jiāngliú

Burmese name
- Burmese: ထန်စျန်း

Japanese name
- Kanji: 玄奘三蔵
Transcriptions
- Romanization: Genjo Sanzō

Indonesian name
- Indonesian: Tong Sam Cong

Tang Sanzang is a fictional Chinese Buddhist monk and pilgrim who is a central character in the 16th-century novel Journey to the West by Wu Cheng'en. He is based on the real Chinese Buddhist monk Xuanzang. His birth surname name was Chen (陳), but having been found in a river as a baby—he was abandoned after birth—he was given the name Jiāng Liú (江流; this 'milk name' literally meaning "River Float", a nod to the fact that he was found in a river). When he first became a monk, his Dharma name is Xuánzàng (玄奘; literally meaning "Great Mystery"). Later, upon swearing brotherhood with the Tang Emperor, he gains the new surname, Tang (唐), and for the pilgrimage, he is called by the new given-name/epithet, Sānzàng (三藏, lit. The "Three Baskets"; referring to the Tripiṭaka), but is also widely known by his courtesy name Tang Seng (唐僧, lit. the "Tang Monk").

The title Sānzàng refers to his mission to seek the Sanzangjing, or the "Three Collections of (Buddhist Great vehicle) Scriptures". In some English translations of Journey to the West, the title is rendered as Tripitaka which is the original Sanskrit term for the Sanzangjing. His name Tang Sanzang reflects his status as an oath brother of Emperor Taizong of the Tang dynasty.

== Character description ==
The monk's title Sanzang refers to his mission to seek the Tripitaka, which is the Sanskrit name for collections of ancient Buddhist scriptures. In most English translations of Journey to the West, including the authoritative translation by Anthony Yu, his name is rendered as Tripitaka. In the novel, he takes the name Tang after becoming an oath brother of Emperor Taizong of the Tang dynasty.

Sanzang is a Buddhist monk who is a reincarnation of Golden Cicada (Chinese: 金蟬子), a disciple of the Buddha. Sanzang's original family name was Chen, the posthumous son of Palace Graduate Chen Guangrui and Yin Wenjiao, the daughter of chief minister Yin Kaishen. After being awarded the first place in a national examination, Chen Guangrui was appointed Prefect of Jiangzhou (modern Jiujiang). While on his way to take office, he was murdered by a ferryman named Liu Hong, who also abducts his wife and takes his place as Prefect. When Chen's son is born, Yin Wenjiao puts the baby on a wooden board and sets him floating adrift down the Yangzi River, out of fear of him being killed by Liu Hong. The baby reaches Gold Mountain Monastery and is found by the Abbot, who gives him the nickname "Jiāngliú" (江流, lit. "River Float"). The abbot sees that River Float is taken care of, and when he grows up and becomes a Buddhist novice, he gives him the Dharma name Xuanzang. When Xuanzang turns 18, he is reunited with his father, whose body was saved from death by the Dragon King of River Hong; together they look for Lady Yin and bring Liu Hong to justice.

He is sent by the Emperor Taizong on a mission to Tianzhu (an ancient Chinese name for India) to fetch a set of Mahayana Buddhist scriptures back to China for the purpose of spreading Buddhism in his native land. He becomes sworn brothers with the Emperor of the Tang dynasty, and the emperor sees him off from the capital Chang'an with two escorts to accompany him. This contrasts with the historical Xuanzang, who disobeyed the Emperor's orders against foreign travel and did not have his permission.

Sanzang is helpless at defending himself and his two escorts are killed during his first encounter with demons after his departure from Chang'an. The bodhisattva Guanyin helps Tang Sanzang find 4 powerful supernatural beings—Sun Wukong, Zhu Bajie, Sha Wujing and White Dragon Horse (a monkey, pig, fish, and a dragon horse spirit, respectively)—to aid and protect him on his journey. The 4 of them become Sanzang's disciples and receive enlightenment and redemption for their past sins once the pilgrimage is complete.

Along the journey, Sanzang is constantly terrorised by monsters and demons due to a legend which says that one can attain immortality by consuming his flesh because he is a reincarnation of a holy being. One of his disciples is caught by a monster, and the other falls into the Tongtian River, also known as the River of Communion with Heaven. On the other hand, there are several attempts on marrying him made by demons such as the Scorpion Demoness and the Golden-Nosed White-Haired Mouse Spirit.

At the end of the novel, Sanzang is appointed as the Buddha of Sandalwood Merit. This is a nod to the fact that, in Buddhism, sandalwood (and, by extension, sandalwood incense) is seen as having the power to distil purity by burning-away negative spiritual impurities; Sanzang, as Golden Cicada, had dismissed the Buddha's teachings and-so was sentenced to re-incarnate as a Buddhist ten consecutive times to distil himself spiritually, expelling spiritual impurities until only purity was left, ultimately achieving Buddhahood, making him the "Buddha of Sandalwood Merit".

== Historical background ==
Tang Sanzang is modeled after the historical Tang dynasty Buddhist monk Xuanzang, whose life was the book's inspiration; the real Xuanzang made a perilous journey on foot from China to India (and back) to obtain Buddhist sutras.

In contrast to the historical Xuanzang, a wise and learned scholar (he was in his late 20s when he left for India), the fictional Tang Sanzang is presented as a young monk who is extremely naive, showing idealistic compassion without wisdom. Tang Sanzang is usually quick to fall for the facades of demons who have disguised themselves as innocent humans, as he cannot recognize them, whereas Sun Wukong can. This frequently leads to tension when Sun Wukong tries to protect him from such threats. One such popular instance was when the White Bone Demon disguised three times as family members—first, a young woman. After Wukong "killed" the woman, the demon escaped, but Wukong was punished by Tang Sanzang for it. The second was the young woman's elderly mother, looking for her daughter. The third was the young woman's elderly father, searching for his wife and child. Upon the "death" of the father by Wukong's hands, Wukong finally killed the demon before she got away. Tang Sanzang, convinced that Wukong had actually killed three innocent people, sent him away, despite protests. Tang Sanzang usually punishes him by chanting the words of the Tight-Fillet Spell (Chinese: 緊箍咒) given to Tang Sanzang by the bodhisattva Guanyin to control Wukong, which causes the latter's headband to contract and give him acute headaches.

Like Sun Wukong, Tang Sanzang is often described as a god of protection. Ksitigarbha, a highly revered bodhisattva in East Asian Buddhism, is occasionally mistaken for Tang Sanzang because the former is often portrayed like Tang Sanzang—dressed in a similarly patterned kasaya robe, wearing a Buddhist crown (an Ushnisha or a Black Crown), and wielding a khakkhara staff. In some depictions or media sometimes Sanzang is depicted as a female monk or nun but this is mostly in Japan.

== Gallery ==
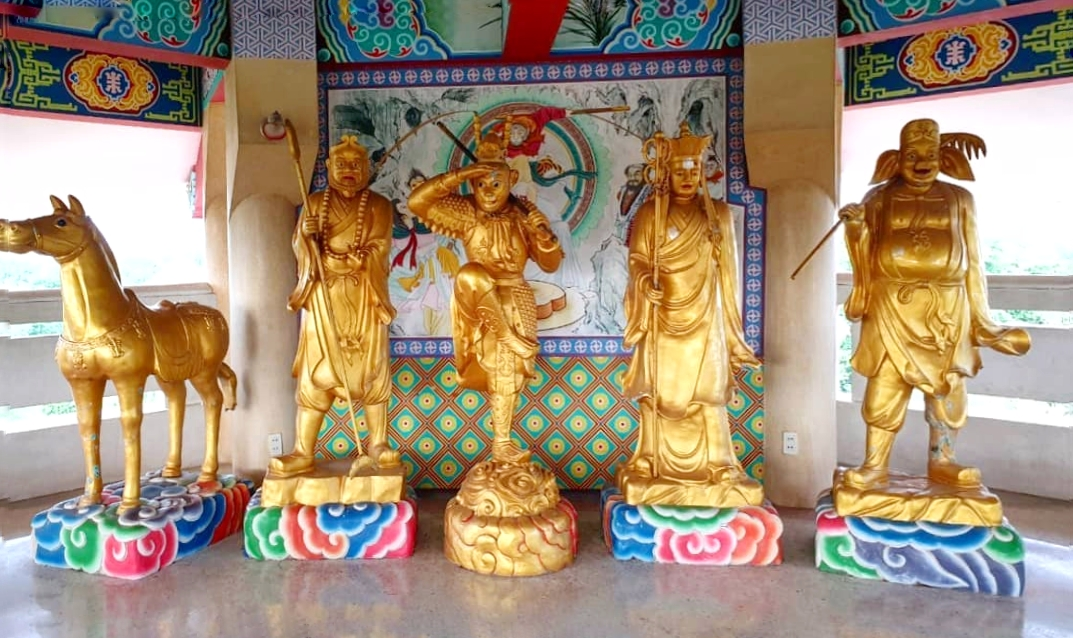
The golden statues of White Dragon Horse, Sha Wujing, Sun Wukong, Tang Sanzang and Zhu Bajie at the Rua Yai City Pillar Shrine in Suphan Buri, Thailand
