= The Old Woman and Her Pig =

Folk song

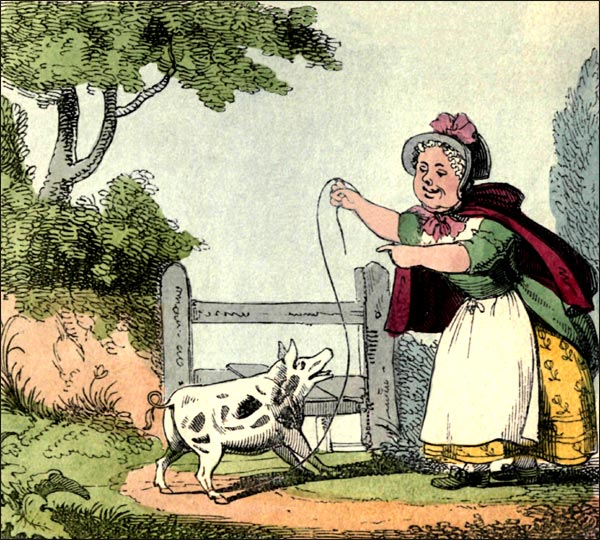
- Illustration of the nursery rhyme published 1 November 1819 by John Harris

Folk tale
- Name: "The Old Woman and Her Pig"
- Also known as: "The Old Woman who found a Silver Penny"
- Aarne–Thompson grouping: Formula Tales (2000-2399) Cumulative Tales (2000-2100) "The Old Woman and Her Pig" (2030)
- Country: England
- Region: Europe
- Origin Date: 1806 (first published)
- Published in: The Juvenile Library by Tabart & Co. at No. 157 New Bond Street, London

"The Old Woman and Her Pig" is a cumulative English nursery rhyme which originally developed in oral lore form. It was collected and first appeared as an illustrated print on 27 May 1806 as "The True History of a Little Old Woman Who Found a Silver Penny" published by Tabart & Co. at No. 157 New Bond Street, London, for their Juvenile Library. It has been republished and rewritten in print form many times. The story has established variations in other cultures, such as the Swiss folklore classic Joggeli söll ga Birli schüttle (1908), which was translated into English as A Boy Went Out to Gather Pears (1966).

== Variations ==
As the nursery rhyme has been retold and republished many times, variations in the name have appeared mostly under two broad categories:

Category one refers to the pig. For example:

- "The Old Woman and Her Pig"
- "The Old Woman and Her Pig: An Old English Tale"
- "The Remarkable Adventures of an Old Woman and Her Pig: An Ancient Tale in a Modern Dress"

Category two refers to the coin. For example:

- "The Old Woman and the Crooked Sixpence"
- "The True History of a Little Old Woman Who Found a Silver Penny"
- "The Tale of Old Mother Muggins Who Finds 'a New Sixpence'"

There is one publication which transcends both categories and does not mention the woman.

- "The Pig Bought with a Silver Penny"

== Classification ==
Under the Aarne–Thompson–Uther Index (ATU) of types of folktales, this nursery rhyme is classified as follows:

- 2000-2399: Formula Tales
- 2000-2100: Cumulative Tales
- 2030: The old woman and her pig

Under Stith Thompson's Motif-Index of Folk-Literature, this nursery rhyme is classified as follows:

- Z. Miscellaneous Groups of Motifs
- Z0—Z99. Formulas
- Z40. Chains with interdependent members
- Z41. The old woman and her pig

Under the Roud Folk Song Index, this nursery rhyme is classified as follows:

- 746. "The Old Woman and her Pig", "Little Betty Pringle"

== Plot ==
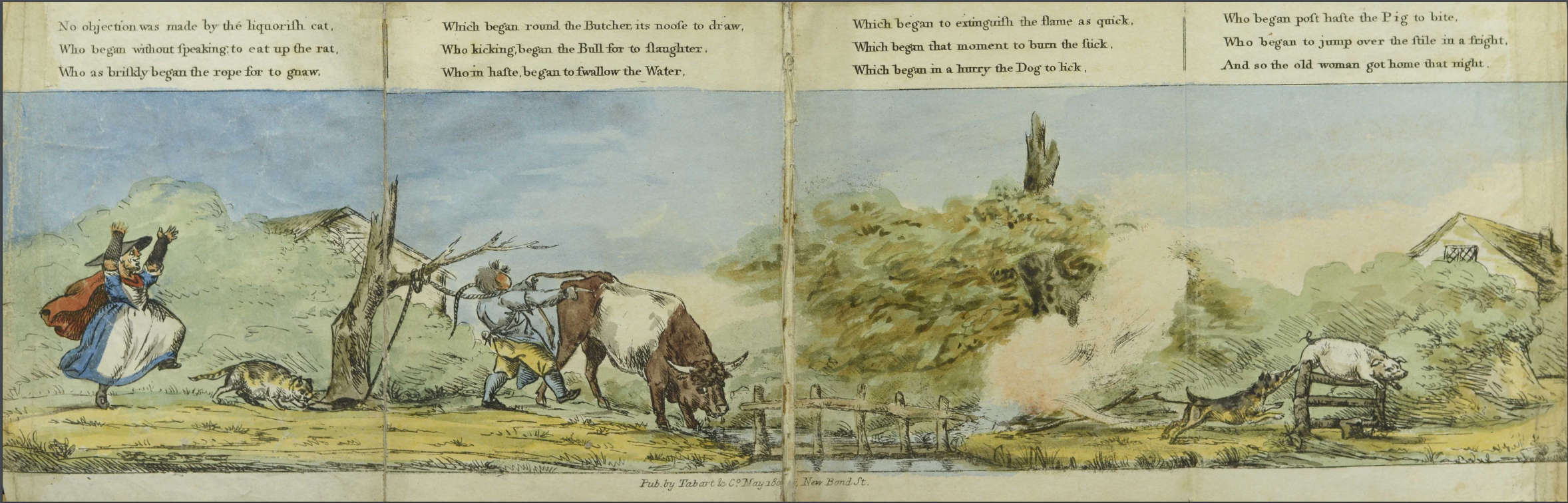
1806 illustration from "The True History of a Little Old Woman Who Found a Silver Penny"

An old woman finds a silver penny while cleaning her chambers and goes to buy a pig, but can't get home when it refuses to go over a stile, she asks:

1. A dog to bite the pig, then on refusal;
2. A stick to beat the dog, then on refusal;
3. A fire to burn the stick, then on refusal;
4. Water to quench the fire, then on refusal;
5. A bull to drink the water, then on refusal;
6. A butcher to slaughter the bull, then on refusal;
7. A rope to hang the butcher, then on refusal;
8. A rat to gnaw the rope, then on refusal;
9. A cat to eat the rat.

The cat accepts her request causing her demands to be met in a cascade until the pig jumps the stile, allowing the woman to go home.

The storyline has varied through adaptations made over the centuries by retellers, as listed below. In some modern versions, the ox is replaced by a horse and the butcher is replaced by a rider who urges the horse.

== The rhyme scheme ==
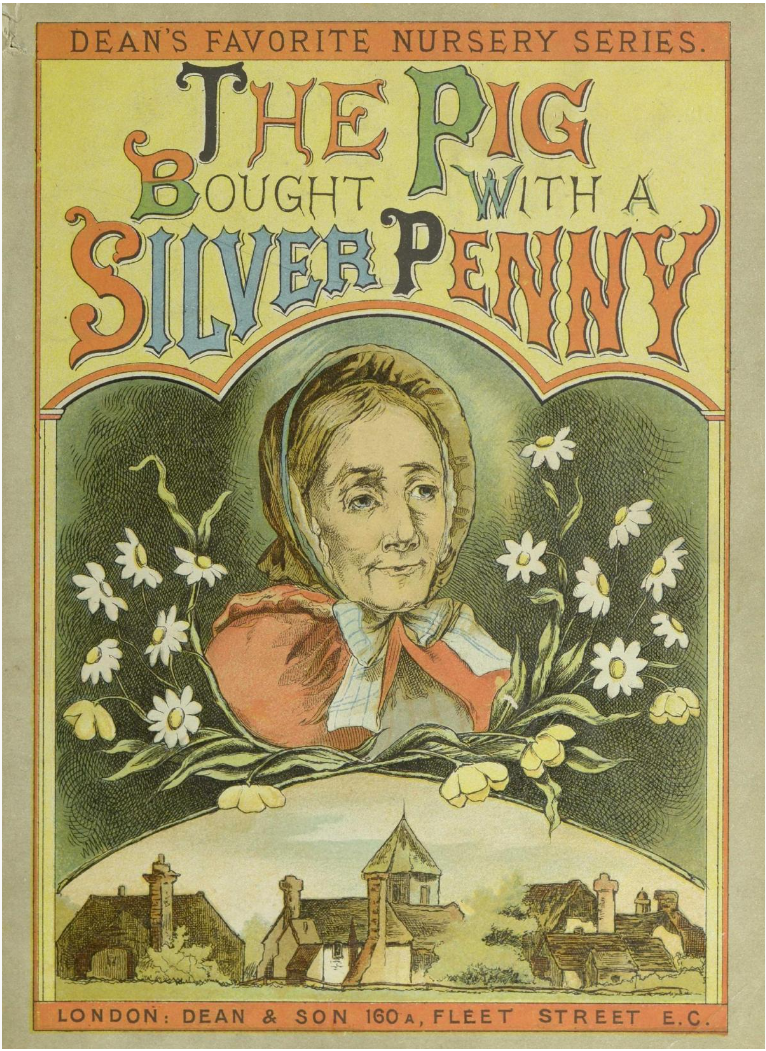
Front cover of "The Pig Bought with a Silver Penny" (1881)

The rhyme scheme used for "The Old Woman and Her Pig" is simple couplets interspersed with the odd triplet as exemplified by the verses below:

Delighted she seized it, and, dancing a jig,
Exclaim'd, "With this money I'll purchase a pig."
So saying, away to the market she went,
And the fruits of her fortunate sweeping she spent
Which won't be so civil my Pig just to bite
till he crosses the Stile, though the trouble's so slight,
And now I shan't get to my cottage to-night.

== Background and adaptations ==
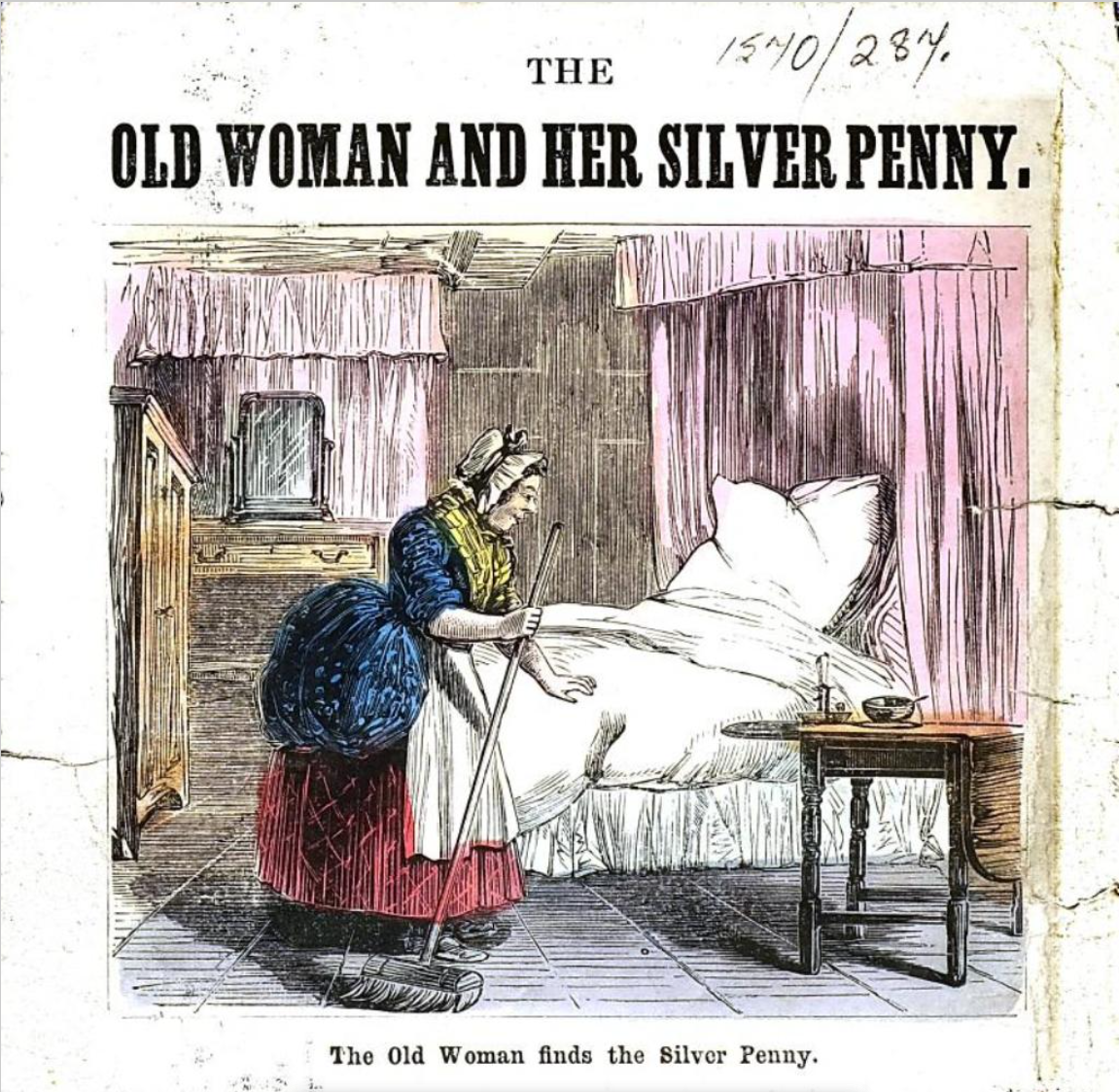
1850 illustration by George Cruikshank

Folklorists such as Lina Eckenstein (1906) have noted that the rhyme shares a structural lineage with the Aramaic Passover song Chad Gadya (lit. "One Little Goat"), which first appeared in the printed Prague Haggadah in 1590. She theorized that European nursery rhymes like "The Old Woman and Her Pig" are secular adaptations of the Chad Gadya chant, featuring a similar "hierarchy of violence" or "concatenation" involving a dog, a stick, fire, water, and an ox.

Near the beginning of the 19th century, there were significant improvements in the technology of printed illustrations. Publishers then recognized a market for children's illustrated books with the success of books such as The Picture Gallery for all Good Boys and Girls: 'Exhibition the First', which was published on 28 April 1801. Two of the earliest children's publishers were John Harris and Benjamin Tabart, who both chose to publish the common nursery rhyme "The Old Woman and the Pig" in illustrated form. After these early forerunners, the nursery rhyme was republished numerous times, either as part of a compendium or as a stand-alone illustrated book. In the 19th century, the retellers were not given credit by publishers but by the 20th century, the retellers were given credit as they varied the rhyme and the story. A selection of popular single story retellings in the 19th and 20th centuries are listed below:

=== 19th-century ===
- 1806 – "The True History of a Little Old Woman Who Found a Silver Penny", published by Benjamin Tabart
- 1814 – "The History of the Old Woman and Her Pig", published by John Harris
- 1830 – "The Old Woman and Her Pig", published by Williams, Orton & Company
- 1835 – "Little Old Woman and Her Silver Penny", published by Henry Mozley and Sons
- 1838 – "The Old Woman and Her Silver Penny", published by James Catnach
- 1847 – "The Little Old Woman and Her Silver Penny", published by Thomas Dean & Son
- 1847 – "The Ancient Story of the Old Dame and Her Pig: A Legend of Obstinacy: Shewing How It Cost the Old Lady a World of Trouble, & the Pig His Tail", published by David Bogue
- 1850 – "The Old Woman and Her Silver Penny", published by Read & Co.
- 1855 – "The Old Woman and Her Pig", published by Sampson Low
- 1875 – "The Story of the Old Woman and Her Crooked Sixpence, and Some Rhymes Told by Mother Goose", published by S.W. Tilton & Company
- 1881 – "The Pig Bought with a Silver Penny", published by Dean & Son
- 1887 – "The Story of the Poor Old Woman and the Obstinate Little Pig", published by J. Clarke & Company
- 1890 – "The Old Woman and Her Pig", published by McLoughlin Brothers

=== 20th-century ===
- 1905 – "The Old Woman and Her Silver Sixpence", published by Dean & Son
- 1908 – Joggeli söll ga Birli schüttle ("Joggeli Should Go Shake the Pears"), a Swiss adaptation by Lisa Wenger with over one century of publication, which Felix Hoffmann visually updated and which was translated into English for the UK and the US as A Boy Went Out to Gather Pears (1966).
- 1928 – "The Old Woman and the Crooked Sixpence", published by Macmillan
- 1936 – "The Old Woman and Her Pig", retold by M. G. Barnes
- 1944 – "The Old Woman and Her Pig", retold by Wallace C. Wadsworth
- 1960 – "Old Woman and Her Pig", retold by Paul Galdone
- 1963 – "The Old Woman and Her Pig", published by Holt, Rinehart and Winston
- 1966 – A Boy Went Out to Gather Pears, an English translation of the Swiss adaptation Joggeli wott go Birli schüttle by Felix Hoffmann
- 1973 – "The Old Woman and Her Pig": Well Lived Tales, retold by Vera Southgate
- 1984 – "Home Before Midnight: A Traditional Verse", retold by Bobbie Moore
- 1992 – "The Old Woman and Her Pig", retold by Eric A. Kimmel
- 1993 – "The Old Woman and Her Pig: An Old English Tale", retold by Rosanne Litzinger
