= A Boy Went Out to Gather Pears =

1966 picture book by Felix Hoffmann

- Author: Felix Hoffmann
- Original title: Joggeli wott go Birli schüttle
- Illustrator: Felix Hoffmann
- Language: English (translation); Swiss Standard German (original)
- Genre: Picture book, folk tale
- Publisher: Harcourt, Brace & World (US); Oxford University Press (UK)
- Publication date: September 28, 1966
- Publication place: Switzerland (original); United States, United Kingdom (translation)
- Pages: Unpaged
- ISBN: 978-0-15-210690-4
- OCLC: 311258

A Boy Went Out to Gather Pears is a 1966 picture book for children by the Swiss author and illustrator Felix Hoffmann. It is the English translation of Hoffmann's 1963 adaptation (Swiss Standard German: Joggeli wott go Birli schüttle, lit. 'Joggeli Wants to Shake the Pears'), published by Harcourt, Brace & World in the United States and Oxford University Press in the United Kingdom.

In literary history, this story is categorized as ATU type 2030, and that category is named "The Old Woman and Her Pig" after that original centuries-old oral tradition story from England. This category is defined by the common specific plot mechanic of a protagonist organizing a chain of coercion to force a stubborn character to perform a task. The violence in these stories has slowly decreased alongside society's deemphasis of violence in childrearing and teaching.

A Boy Went Out to Gather Pears is distinguished for its use of lithography and its oblong format which accommodates the widening cumulative rhyme structure as it unfolds. It was named one of the New York Times Best Illustrated Children's Books of the year. A Boy Went Out to Gather Pears was indexed in Masterworks of Children's Literature (Volume 8), a curated canon of the 20th century. Hoffmann is regarded as one of the three defining figures of the Swiss picture book tradition in the 20th century.

== Plot ==
The narrative follows the structure of a cumulative rhyme. A boy is sent by his master to shake pears from a tree, but he refuses to work and sits in the grass. The master then sends a dog to bite the boy, but the dog refuses. The master sends a stick to beat the dog, but the stick refuses.

The hierarchy of violence continues with fire to burn the stick, water to quench the fire, a calf to drink the water, and a butcher to kill the calf. In the final resolution, the master intervenes directly, frightening the butcher. This triggers a rapid chain reaction in reverse: the butcher moves to kill the calf, the calf moves to drink the water, the water moves to quench the fire, the fire moves to burn the stick, the stick moves to beat the dog, and the dog moves to bite the boy. Finally, the boy shakes the pears, and they fall to the ground.

== Background ==
=== Folklore origin ===
The text is derived from the traditional Swiss-German rhyme Joggeli söll ga Birli schüttle (lit. "Joggeli Should Go Shake the Pears"). It belongs to a family of cumulative folk songs (Kettenmärchen) across Europe, classified in the Aarne–Thompson–Uther Index as ATU 2030, and it originated in the oral tradition called "The Old Woman and Her Pig".

The protagonist, Joggeli (a diminutive of Jakob), represents the stubborn child archetype common in pedagogical folklore. Scholars have noted the structural parallel of morphological lineage with the Aramaic Passover song Chad Gadya, lit. 'One Little Goat', which appeared in the printed Prague Haggadah in 1590. Folklorists such as Lina Eckenstein (1906) have theorized that European nursery rhymes like Joggeli are secular adaptations of the Chad Gadya chant, with a similar concatenation involving a dog, a stick, fire, water, and an ox.

The Swiss National Museum notes that in the original structure, the master character represents God, mirroring the theological intervention in Chad Gadya. Conversely, critic Holger Saarmann said that the Swiss and German variants resolve with a secular harvest rather than the divine intervention (with God destroying the Angel of Death) in the Haggadah version.

Literary and educational critics have analyzed the rhyme within the tradition of authoritarian child-rearing. The narrative structure in which a refusal to work triggers an escalating hierarchy of violence, aligns with a philosophy coined in 1977 called "black pedagogy" (Schwarze Pädagogik), which critiques methods of breaking a child's will. At the time of Lisa Wenger's first version, the pedagogical norms of 1908 included whipping, stabbing, and burning as acceptable disciplinary themes.

=== Joggeli söll ga Birli schüttle (1908) ===
Joggeli söll ga Birli schüttle
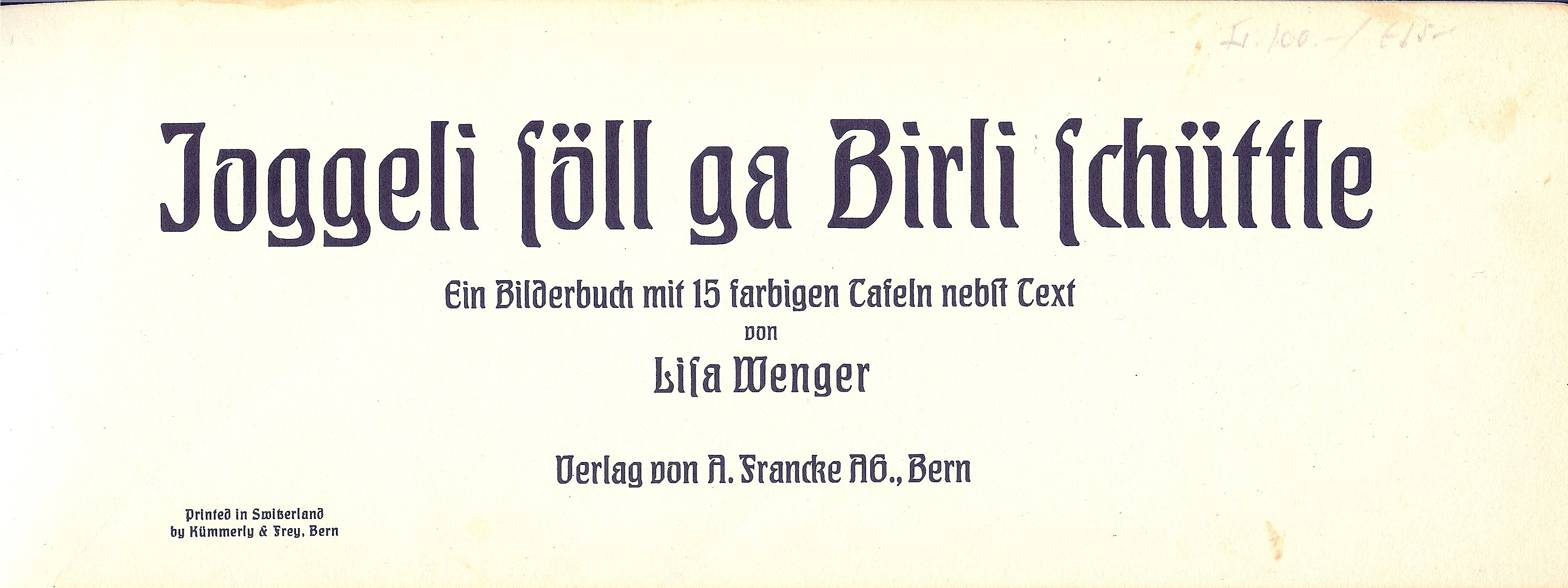
- Author: Lisa Wenger
- Illustrator: Lisa Wenger
- Language: Swiss German
- Genre: Picture book
- Publisher: A. Francke Verlag
- Publication date: 1908
- Publication place: Switzerland
- Media type: Print (hardcover)

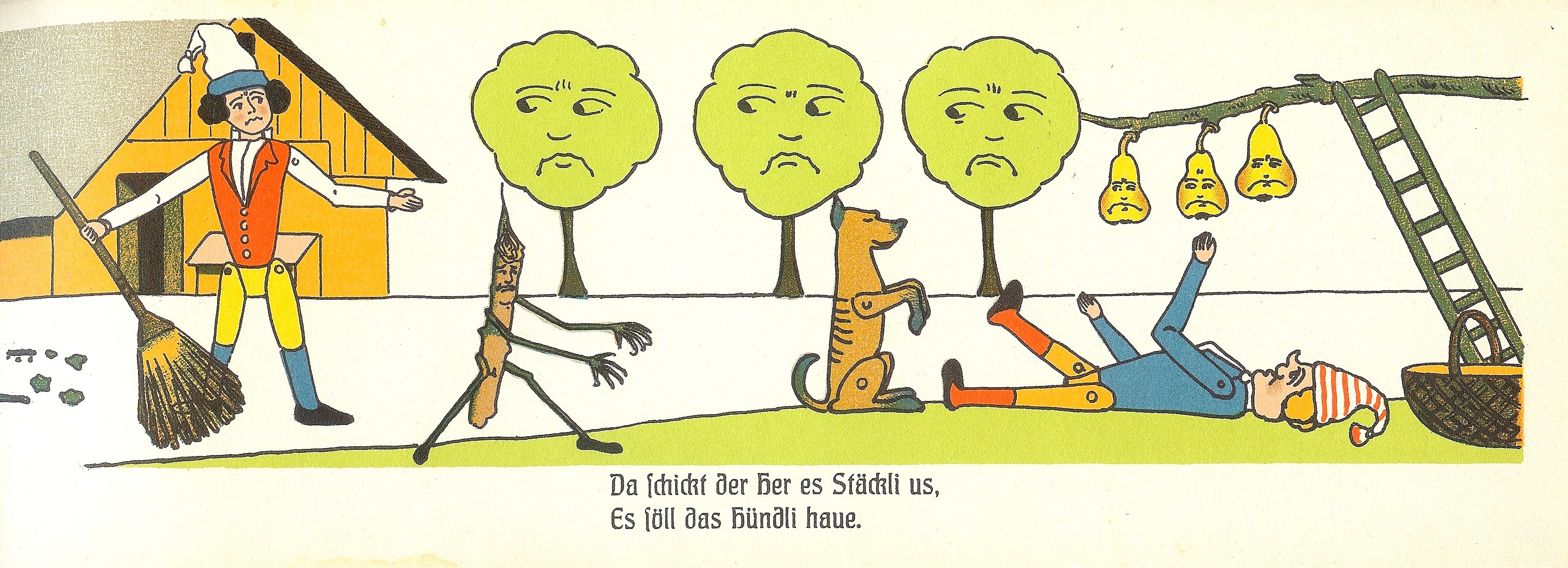
The stick is supposed to beat the dog so that it bites Joggeli, so that he picks the pears...

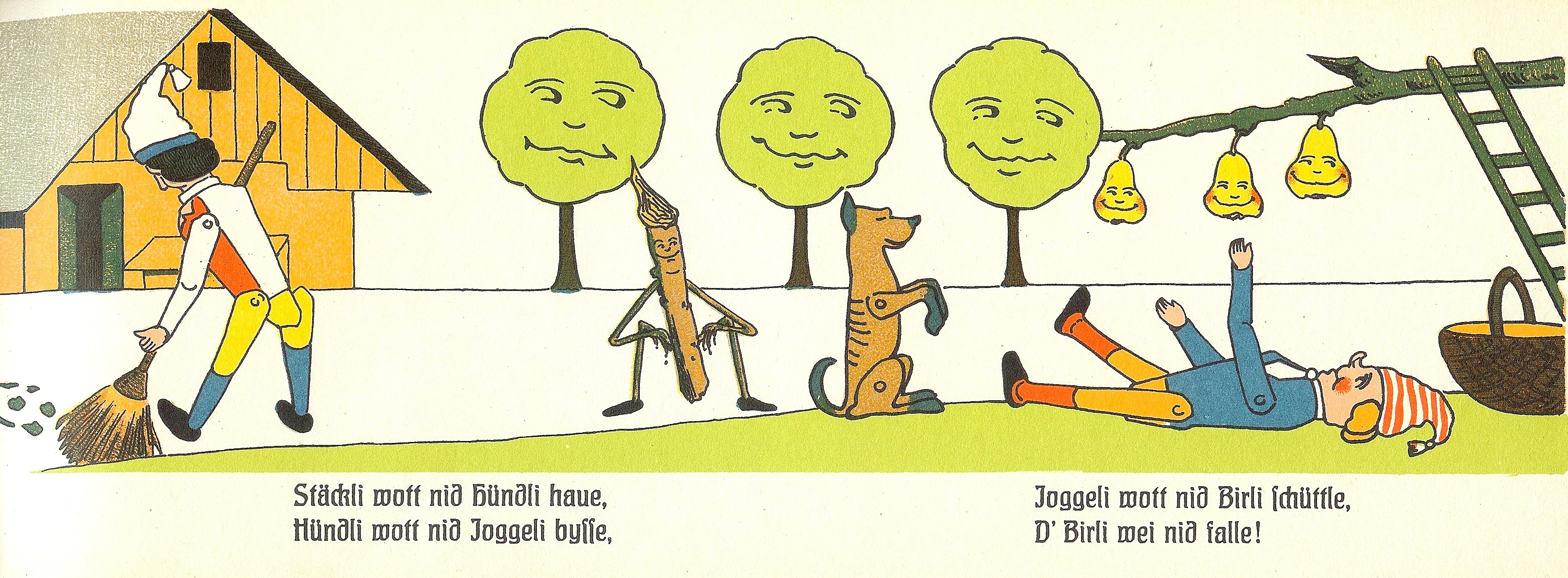
... but the stick does not want to beat the dog, the dog does not want to bite Joggeli, and Joggeli does not want to shake the pears from the tree.

Joggeli söll ga Birli schüttle was written by Swiss author and painter Lisa Wenger, and was published in 1908 by A. Francke Verlag in Bern. It is the rhyme's first picture book adaptation, establishing the visual iconography. It is considered a classic in Swiss publishing history; the Swiss National Museum has featured it as a primary subject in exhibitions on popular culture. The museum considered Wenger's work pivotal in transforming a fleeting oral rhyme into a permanent "aesthetic work" of national heritage. By capturing the Bernese German dialect in a high-quality visual format, the book helped codify the rhyme as a shared cultural touchstone for German-speaking Switzerland.

Wenger's work emerged during the "golden age" of Swiss picture books, alongside that of her contemporary Ernst Kreidolf, whose Flower Fairy Tales (1898) established the Art Nouveau (Jugendstil) style in the genre. Wenger's 1908 first edition contains a more violent conclusion than all subsequent print versions of this folk tale by any author. In her initial text, the hierarchy of violence includes a hangman (Henker), whom the master summons to kill the butcher when he refuses to slaughter the ox. According to the Forum of Swiss History Schwyz (a branch of the Swiss National Museum), publisher A. Francke Verlag (Alex Francke) removed the hangman in the second edition to align with changing pedagogical standards for children.

The museum places the book's enduring popularity alongside A Bell for Ursli (1945), the seminal Swiss picture book by Alois Carigiet about a boy seeking a cowbell for a spring festival.

Wenger utilized a "long landscape format" in which the cumulative verse could visually unfold as a procession across the page spread, which was retained in Felix Hoffmann's later adaptations.

Joggeli söll ga Birli schüttle became a distinct commercial success. The Swiss National Museum stated that the story has "delighted generations of Swiss children for 110 years". Its dozens of continuous reprints include a 100th anniversary edition in 2008 and a 2023 edition, by publisher Cosmos Verlag.

== Publications ==
In the 1960s, Felix Hoffmann created a new visual interpretation of the tale using lithography. This was published in Switzerland in Swiss Standard German as Joggeli wott go Birli schüttle (1963). It was translated into English as A Boy Went Out to Gather Pears and published on September 28, 1966 by Oxford University Press in London and Harcourt, Brace & World in New York. The translation work is uncredited, but its copyright is held jointly by those publishers.

The book was printed in a distinct oblong format measuring 22 by 9.5 centimeters (8.7 in × 3.7 in). At pre-publication in 1966, Kirkus Reviews noted, "Eventually the line-up fills out the wide page spread, but at the beginning, there is an excessive amount of white space."

- Wenger, Lisa (1908). Joggeli söll ga Birli schüttle (in Swiss German). Bern: A. Francke Verlag.
- Hoffmann, Felix (1963). Joggeli wott go Birli schüttle (in Swiss German). Aarau: Sauerländer.
- Hoffmann, Felix (September 28, 1966) [1963]. A Boy Went Out to Gather Pears [Joggeli wott go Birli schüttle] (first English ed.). New York City: Harcourt, Brace & World. ISBN 978-0-15-210690-4. OCLC 311258.

== Reception ==
Joggeli söll ga Birli schüttle (1908) became a distinct commercial success. The Swiss National Museum states that the story has "delighted generations of Swiss children for 110 years".

A Boy Went Out to Gather Pears (1966) received critical praise in the United States and the United Kingdom. It was selected as one of the New York Times Best Illustrated Children's Books of 1966. At pre-release, Kirkus Reviews wrote, "This type of cumulative verse is always dependable with children, especially in groups, but it seems too little for a whole book. The woodcut illustrations are well done, but the visual repetition is less likely to appeal than the oral does. Eventually the line-up fills out the wide page spread, but at the beginning, there is an excessive amount of white space."

== Legacy ==
The 1908 book, Joggeli söll ga Birli schüttle, is regarded as a defining work in Swiss children's literature. The Swiss National Museum identifies it as one of the few early picture books to achieve "classic" status, stating that the story has "delighted generations of Swiss children for 110 years". In 2008, the 100th anniversary edition was released, and in 2023 another edition was published, by Cosmos Verlag.

Between 2018 and 2020, the Swiss National Museum featured the character as a primary subject in the exhibition Joggeli, Pitschi, Globi, which examined the most "popular Swiss picture books" that have "captivated countless readers over many generations". The museum categorizes the book alongside other national icons such as Heidi, Pitschi, and Schellen-Ursli (A Bell for Ursli).

Characters like Joggeli are domestic Swiss icons, and the museum notes that "some Swiss artists, such as Ernst Kreidolf, Felix Hoffmann, and Hans Fischer, have also become famous beyond Switzerland's borders thanks to their illustrations."

A Boy Went Out to Gather Pears was indexed in Masterworks of Children's Literature (Volume 8), a curated canon of the 20th century. Hoffmann, along with Wenger and Alois Carigiet, is often regarded as one of the defining figures of the Swiss picture book tradition in the 20th century.

== See also ==
- Green Eggs and Ham (1960), from the Dr. Seuss bibliography
- Curious George, an international children's picture book series since 1941
- Puer aeternus, the "eternal boy" archetype, adapted from Greek mythology into analytical psychology by the Swiss psychiatrist Carl Jung
- H. R. Giger, Swiss artist specializing in childhood trauma
- Great chain of being
- Swiss folklore
