= Vera Southgate =

British pedagogist practiced from the late-1950s until the mid-1980s

- Born: Vera Pigg; March 10, 1916; County Durham
- Died: March 23, 1995 (aged 79); County Durham
- Other name: Vera Southgate-Booth
- Occupations: Teacher, educationalist, author
- Board member of: President of the United Kingdom Literacy Association (1970–1971), Committee of inquiry into the teaching in the schools of reading (aka The Bullock Inquiry)(1972–1975)

Academic background
- Education: Master of Arts (MA) in Education
- Alma mater: Birmingham University
- Academic advisor: Professor Francis William Warburton (Experimental Education)

Academic work
- Discipline: Pedagogy of Literacy (Reading)
- Institutions: Manchester University
- Main interests: Teacher education, Initial Teaching Alphabet, Literacy test
- Writing career
- Genre: Children's literature
- Notable works: Ladybird Books;-Well Loved Tales

Vera Southgate (10 March 1916 – 23 March 1995) was a British educationalist who dedicated herself to improving how children were taught to read English from the late 1950s to the mid-1980s, a period when many different methods were practised, including the initial teaching alphabet, phonics, and whole language.

Vera Southgate was a prolific author of academic papers, developed the Southgate reading tests, and served on the Bullock government inquiry. She also evaluated the initial teaching alphabet on behalf of the British government. Her final major research project was a five-year study aimed at improving the reading skills of older children. The resulting publication, Extended Beginning Reading, won the UK Reading Association's Book of the Year award.

Vera Southgate wrote over fifty primers and reading books, often included in basal reading schemes. These books provided a structured, step-by-step approach to teaching children to read. She gained widespread recognition for the Well Loved Tales, a Ladybird-graded reading book series, which sold 80 million copies but reached a much larger audience through schools and libraries.

Thanks to her contributions, Vera Southgate was named the 7th president of the United Kingdom Reading Association and was posthumously inducted into the association's Hall of Fame.

== Personal life ==
Vera Pigg was born on March 10, 1916, in County Durham. Along with her sister Mary, she trained and became a teacher. In 1942, she married Arthur Southgate and stopped teaching to become a housewife. Arthur died in 1948, when Vera was 32. She returned to work and moved to Manchester, where she met Douglas Thomas Booth. They were married in 1961, and Vera became known as Vera Southgate-Booth. However, she continued to publish under her widowed name and was publicly known as Mrs Vera Southgate. Vera had no children, but she had a close relationship with her sister and her nephews. Her nephews often visited her at her holiday home in Llanbedrog, where she read to them from the Ladybird Well Loved Tales, which she had retold. In 1980–81, Vera retired to the coast with her husband at Sidmouth in Devon. After Douglas died in 1986, Vera returned to County Durham to be with her extended family. She died on March 23, 1995, in Consett, County Durham.

== Teaching ==
After her initial schooling, Vera Southgate trained as a teacher and by 1939 had taken up a teaching post in Seaham, County Durham. From this start, Vera went on to teach at infant, junior, secondary, and special schools which provided her with a broad experience of teaching children.

Having established a base of sound teaching experience, Vera went back to furthering her education by attending Birmingham University where she initially studied for a Bachelor of Commerce (BCom) in social studies then followed up with a Master of Arts (MA) in Education. Vera also acquired a Diploma in Psychology (Dip Psych)

These qualifications enabled her to become the Head of the Remedial Education service which enhanced her experience and reputation even further allowing her entry into academia.

== Academic career ==
Arms of the University of Manchester, where Vera Southgate spent her whole academic career.

By 1957, Southgate had taken up a post as a lecturer in curriculum development at the School of Education at the University of Manchester, where she initially focused in the organisation of teacher training for teachers already in-service at Primary Schools.

Over her academic career Vera specialised in the pedagogy of reading, by 1969 her research had already been published in several books and over 70 papers in learned journals, the major works are listed below. Vera also extensively lectured on this subject both in the UK and abroad, including international conferences.

On her retirement in 1980, Vera Southgate donated her library of children's reading books, a collection of 2,589 books which Vera had accumulated over her two decades of study, to the John Rylands University Library of Manchester.

Vera Southgate continued to be accredited in academic publications for work previously done and she also continued to publish and speak until 1986, as detailed: –

== Published academic works ==
The major academic works authored or co-authored by Vera Southgate were: –

- 1959;- Southgate Group Reading Tests (supplemented by a Manual of Instructions) by Vera Southgate, London: University of London Press
- 1969;- i.t.a.: an independent evaluation by F. W. Warburton and Vera Southgate – London, J. Murray
- 1970;- Reading - which approach? by Vera Southgate and Geoffrey R. Roberts, London: University of London Press
- 1972;- Beginning Reading by Southgate, Vera, London: University of London Press
- 1981;- Extending beginning reading by Vera Southgate; Helen Arnold; Sandra Johnson; Schools Council (Great Britain), London: Published for the Schools Council by Heinemann Educational Books
- 1983;- Planning for Reading Success; - Children who do read (Book 1) by Vera Southgate
- 1984;- Planning for Reading Success; - Reading: teaching for learning (Book 2) by Vera Southgate

Vera Southgate prolifically published academic articles and papers in education journals with the more noteworthy listed: -

- 1958;- The construction and applicability of a group reading test for children of low reading ability by Vera Southgate, University of Birmingham M.A.
- 1963;- Augmented roman alphabet experiment an outsider's report, by Vera Southgate, article in Educational Review (1963 November)
- 1965;- Approaching i.t.a. results with caution, Vera Southgate article in Educational Research (1965 Feb)
- 1967;- A few comments on ‘reading drive, by Vera Southgate, an article published in Educational Research (1967 Feb)
- 1967;- Variables affecting aesthetic appreciation, in relation to age, by E E Rump; Vera Southgate, Article published in British Journal of Educational Psychology (1967 Feb)
- 1968;- Identifying Major Problems in Reading in England, by Vera Southgate, an article published in: Int Reading Assn Conf Proc Pt 1, v13 n863-70
- 1968;- Formulae for beginning reading tuition by Vera Southgate, an article in Publication: Educational Research, v11 n1 (1968 November): 23–30
- 1970;- i.t.a.: what is the evidence? a book for parents and teachers. by Vera Southgate
- 1972;- Literacy at all levels: proceedings of the eighth annual conference of the United Kingdom Reading Association, Manchester 1971, by Vera Southgate
- 1973;- How important is the infant reading scheme? by Vera Southgate; Christine Y Lewis, an article in publication; Literacy, v7 n2 (1973 June): 4-13
- 1973;- The Language Arts in Informal British Primary Schools by Vera Southgate, an article in publication; The Reading Teacher, v26 n4 (1973): 367-373
- 1973;- Reading: three to thirteen by Vera Southgate, an Article in Publication: Education 3–13, vol.1 no.1 (1973 April): Pages 47–52
- 1977;- Beginning Reading in England by Southgate, Vera,
- 1986;- Resources for reading : does quality count? by United Kingdom Reading Association including contributions from Vera Southgate

== Career highlights ==
The major academic highlights of Vera Southgate's career were: –

=== Notable Speeches ===
- 1966 – Vera Southgate was a speaker at the 1st International Congress on Reading in Paris held by the International Reading Association and UNESCO
- 1968 – Vera Southgate was a speaker at the 2nd International Congress on Reading in Copenhagen held by the International Reading Association and UNESCO
- 1971 – Vera Southgate was inaugurated as the 7th president of the UK Reading Association during its congress in Manchester in which the Education Secretary, the Right Honourable Margaret Thatcher M.P. gave a keynote speech
- 1986 – Vera Southgate gave the plenary address at the World Reading Congress in the Institute of Education, London which was her last speech

=== Southgate Group Reading Tests ===
Between 1957 and 1962, Vera Southgate developed the Southgate group reading tests, which were noteworthy for their ability to identify backward readers. The Southgate group reading tests consisted of the following: –

- Test 1 – Word Selection consisting of forms A, B and C and a manual of instruction
- Test 2 – Sentence Completion consisting of forms A and B and a manual of instruction

These were famously used in the National Child Development Study (a longitudinal study), where the tests were applied on the sample children born in 1958, when they reached age seven in 1965.

Vera Southgate was a staunch advocate of testing and monitoring levels of attainment in reading and was accredited by the James report (1972) for her work in measuring incidents of reading failure, which had led to the Lord James's enquiry into teacher education and teacher training.

=== Initial teaching alphabet ===
When the initial teaching alphabet (i.t.a.) was launched, it was the London Institute of Education which spun up the "Reading Research Unit" under the leadership of Dr. John Downing to carryout the original studies, whereas Manchester University with its esteemed School of Education which Vera Southgate was a part had remained on the sidelines, as such Vera Southgate simply observed the progress of the experiment and wrote two papers on her thoughts: –

- Augmented roman alphabet experiment an outsider's report, by Vera Southgate, article in Educational Review (1963 November)
- Approaching i.t.a. results with caution, Vera Southgate article in Educational Research (1965 Feb)

As the i.t.a. was initially a spectacular success, its usage expanded rapidly through the UK and across the English speaking world through the early 1960s, this was done in parallel to seventeen research studies which measured the performance of the i.t.a. By 1966, the Ministry of Education through the Schools Council, undertook an independent evaluation of the i.t.a. and all the published research to-date. As the London Institute of Education had been intricately involved in some of the major studies to-date, it fell on Manchester University to provide the independent & objective assessors, consequently Professor Frank (Francis) Warburton of Experimental Education and Vera Southgate were engaged to carryout the government assessment. The evaluation took place from 1966 to 1967 and the report was compiled in 1968 and published in 1969. Unfortunately Professor Frank Warburton died shortly after completing their assessment so leaving Vera Southgate as one of the pre-eminent independent academic authorities on the i.t.a.

=== Reading – which approach? ===
In 1970, Vera Southgate wrote a book in collaboration with Geoffrey R. Roberts, to help teachers to select an appropriate method and reading materials to use in classrooms to teach children to read. The book compared the major methods available at the time: – Phonics, Look & Say & others such as the initial teaching alphabet. The authors argued that the choice of method was situational and dependent on factors such as the teacher's own style and philosophy on teaching. The book defined a framework whereby a teacher could apply a set of criteria to assess the different methods & materials available including basal reading schemes and then choose the most appropriate.

=== Beginning Reading ===
In 1972, Vera Southgate published a collection of her most important articles and papers to-date in this book. Half the original book (chapters 5–8) was dedicated to the topical initial teaching alphabet, with the remainder socialising the following papers: -

1. Approaches to Beginning Reading in Great Britain
2. Selecting an Approach to Teaching Reading
3. The Importance of Structure in Beginning Reading
4. Early Reading
5. Formulae for Beginning Reading Tuition

=== Bullock Inquiry ===
In 1972, Margaret Thatcher, the Education Secretary set-up a committee of inquiry into the teaching in the schools of reading and the other uses of English under the Chairmanship of Sir Alan Bullock. Vera Southgate as one of the leading British experts in the field was invited to join the committee. She sat on the committee from 1972 until 1975 when the final report was published and presented to Reg Prentice. The recommendations included systematic testing to monitor levels of literacy attained, substantial improvements to teacher training with the opportunity of more advanced new courses and qualifications in English and intervention programmes to help failing pupils.

=== Extended beginning reading ===
In 1973, the Schools Council funded Vera Southgate to lead a team of four researchers at the School of Education in the University of Manchester, to help children of seven years and older improve their reading skills. The research team took half a decade and completed their work in 1977, publishing in 1981 and in so doing won the UK Reading Association book of the year. During the study, Vera used her own Southgate group reading tests to measure the performance of different cohorts of children. The study and final publication were noteworthy for its emphasis on the reading environment, comparing reading aloud with silent reading.

=== United Kingdom Reading Association ===
Between 1970 and 1971, Vera Southgate held the prestigious post of the seventh president of the United Kingdom Reading Association, now known as the United Kingdom Literacy Association. In 1998, Vera was posthumously elected to the associations hall of fame.

== Children's Literature ==
As an academic expert on teaching children to read, Vera Southgate authored or co-authored primers and other books used by children to learn to read, these were often part of basal reading schemes. Vera Southgate would often collaborate with a children's author called John Havenhand who would write the storyline whilst Vera herself would systematically design the word sequence to enable a child to learn to read as easily as possible.

=== The Sounds & Words reading scheme ===
In 1959, Vera Southgate collaborated with John Havenhand to produce an initial six book reading scheme called Sounds and Words: –

Sounds & Words Basal Reading Scheme
No.	Year	Title	Authors
#1	1959	Sounds & Words – Book 1	Vera Southgate & John Havenhand
#2	1959	Sounds & Words - Book 2	Vera Southgate & John Havenhand
#3	1959	Sounds & Words - Book 3	Vera Southgate & John Havenhand
#4	1959	Sounds & Words – Book 4	Vera Southgate & John Havenhand
#5	1959	Sounds & Words – Book 5	Vera Southgate & John Havenhand
#6	1959	Sounds & Words - Book 6	Vera Southgate & John Havenhand
#7	1959	Sounds & Words – Teachers Book	Vera Southgate & John Havenhand

The book series was originally published in 1960 by University of London Press then re-published in 1974 by Hodder & Stoughton Educational of Dunton Green

Subsequently, in 1968, Vera Southgate wrote some further supplementary readers for the scheme: –

- The Five Fat Sisters (1967)
- The Biggest Meat Pie (1967)

=== Ladybird's People at Work ===
The majority of Vera Southgate's work was published by Ladybird Books, between 1962 and 1974, in the easy reading series given the reference 606 by Ladybird Books.

Between 1962 & 1965, Vera Southgate wrote four books of the initial nineteen in the people at work easy reading series (606D) to encourage reading practice prior to a child attaining fluency.

Ladybird – People at Work Series 606B
Grade	No.	Year	Title	Authors
Easy Reading	#01	1962	The Fireman	Vera Southgate & John Havenhand
Easy Reading	#02	1962	The Policeman	Vera Southgate & John Havenhand
Easy Reading	#03	1963	The Nurse	Vera Southgate & John Havenhand
Easy Reading	#07	1965	The Postman and the Postal Service	Vera Southgate

=== Ladybird's Games ===
In 1964, Vera Southgate wrote both books of the Sports (aka Games) easy reading series (606C)

Ladybird – Sports aka Games Series 606C
Grade	No.	Year	Title	Genre
Easy Reading	#01	1964	The Story of Cricket	Factual
Easy Reading	#02	1964	The Story of Football	Factual

=== Ladybird's Well Loved Tales ===
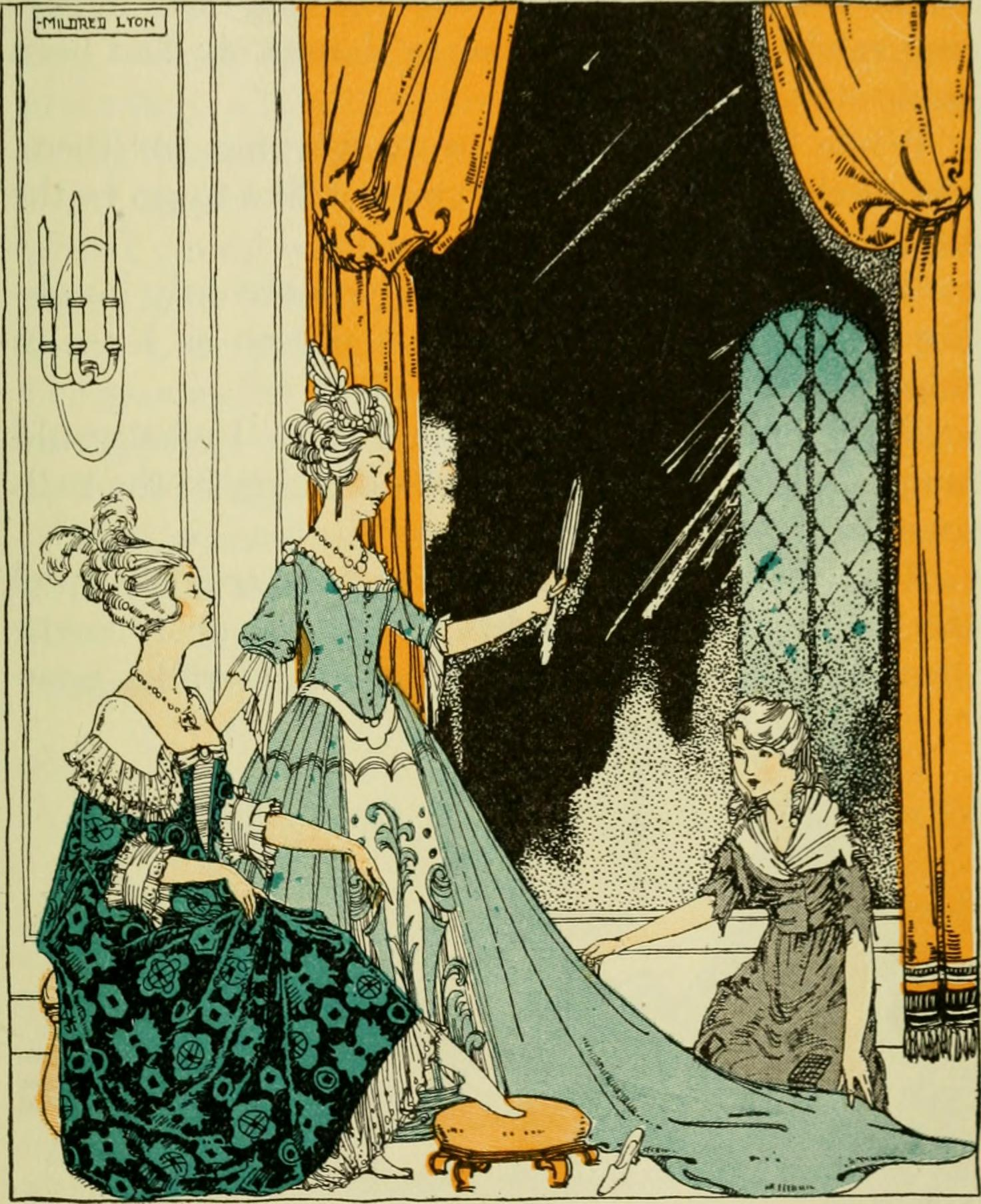
In 1964, Cinderella was the first story Vera Southgate retold in the Well Loved Tales series

Vera Southgate is most famously remembered as the re-teller of the Ladybird Books graded reading scheme; – Well Loved Tales which had global sales of upwards of 80 million, albeit the true readership was larger because such books were often present in libraries and schools. This popularity made Vera Southgate a household name in the second half of the 20th century. Vera wrote the original 27 retold tales between 1964 and 1974, but the series was such a success that Ladybird then extended the series with 19 additional books between 1979 and 1988, but the extended series used different authors to Vera Southgate.

In order to develop reading abilities in children, Vera often picked old fables and cumulative tales whose repetitive nature helped early grade 1 readers to learn before moving onto more complex fairy tales for grade 2 and 3 readers.

The books in the Well Loved Tales series retold by Vera Southgate are listed below: -

Ladybird – Well Loved Tales Series 606D
Grade	No.	Year	Title	Genre
Grade 1	#01	1965	The Elves and the Shoemaker	Fairy tale
Grade 1	#02	1965	The Three Little Pigs	Fable
Grade 1	#03	1966	The Gingerbread Boy	Folk tale
Grade 1	#04	1966	The Little Red Hen	Fable
Grade 1	#05	1967	The Princess and the Pea	Fairy tale
Grade 1	#06	1968	The Sly Fox and the Little Red Hen	Fable
Grade 1	#07	1968	The Three Billy Goats Gruff	Fable
Grade 1	#08	1969	Chicken Licken	Fable
Grade 1	#09	1970	The Enormous Turnip	Folk tale
Grade 1	#10	1971	Goldilocks and the Three Bears	Fairy tale
Grade 1	#11	1971	The Magic Porridge Pot	Fairy tale
Grade 1	#12	1972	The Big Pancake	Folk tale
Grade 1	#13	1973	The Old Woman and her Pig	Nursery Rhyme
Grade 2	#01	1965	Sleeping Beauty	Fairy tale
Grade 2	#02	1966	Dick Wittington and his Cat	Folk tale
Grade 2	#03	1967	Puss in Boots	Fairy tale
Grade 2	#04	1968	Rumpelstiltskin	Fairy tale
Grade 2	#05	1968	Rapunzel	Fairy tale
Grade 2	#06	1969	The Wolf and the Seven Little Kids	Fairy tale
Grade 2	#07	1972	Little Red Riding Hood	Fairy tale
Grade 2	#08	1974	The Musicians of Bremen	Fairy tale
Grade 3	#01	1968	Beauty and the Beast	Fairy tale
Grade 3	#02	1964	Cinderella	Folk tale
Grade 3	#03	1965	Jack and the Beanstalk	Fairy tale
Grade 3	#04	1973	The Princess and the Frog	Fairy tale
Grade 3	#05	1969	Snow White and Rose Red	Fairy tale
Grade 3	#06	1969	Snow White and the Seven Dwarfs	Fairy tale

=== Penny the Poodle ===
In 1964, Vera Southgate again collaborated with John Havenhand to write five of the six books in the "Penny the Poodle" series of children's fictional reading books which was published by E.J. Arnold & Son in Leeds and illustrated by Patricia McGrogan.

Penny the Poodle Series
No.	Year	Title	Authors
#01	1964	Penny in the Pet Shop	Vera Southgate & John Havenhand
#02	1964	Penny's New Home	Vera Southgate & John Havenhand
#03	1964	Penny in Trouble	Vera Southgate & John Havenhand
#04	1964	Penny at the Poodle Parlour	Vera Southgate
#05	1964	Penny at the Seaside	John Havenhand
#06	1964	Penny at the Dog Show	Vera Southgate

=== First Words ===
In 1968, Vera Southgate wrote a series of twelve illustrated books with brief captions intended to teach kindergarten children to read their first words, the series was published by Macmillan

First Words Series
Volume	Year	Title	Author
Volume 1	1968	First Words: Martin's Toys	Vera Southgate
Volume 2	1968	First Words: Jill's Toys	Vera Southgate
Volume 3	1968	First Words: Martin & Jill	Vera Southgate
Volume 4	1968	First Words: Boys & Girls	Vera Southgate
Volume 5	1968	First Words: People	Vera Southgate
Volume 6	1968	First Words: School	Vera Southgate
Volume 7	1968	First Words: Dogs	Vera Southgate
Volume 8	1968	First Words: Pets	Vera Southgate
Volume 9	1968	First Words: In the Country	Vera Southgate
Volume 10	1968	First Words: The Street	Vera Southgate
Volume 11	1968	First Words: Clothes	Vera Southgate
Volume 12	1968	First Words: Colours	Vera Southgate
