= Burgerbibliothek of Berne =

Archive and manuscripts of the Burgergemeinde of Bern, Switzerland

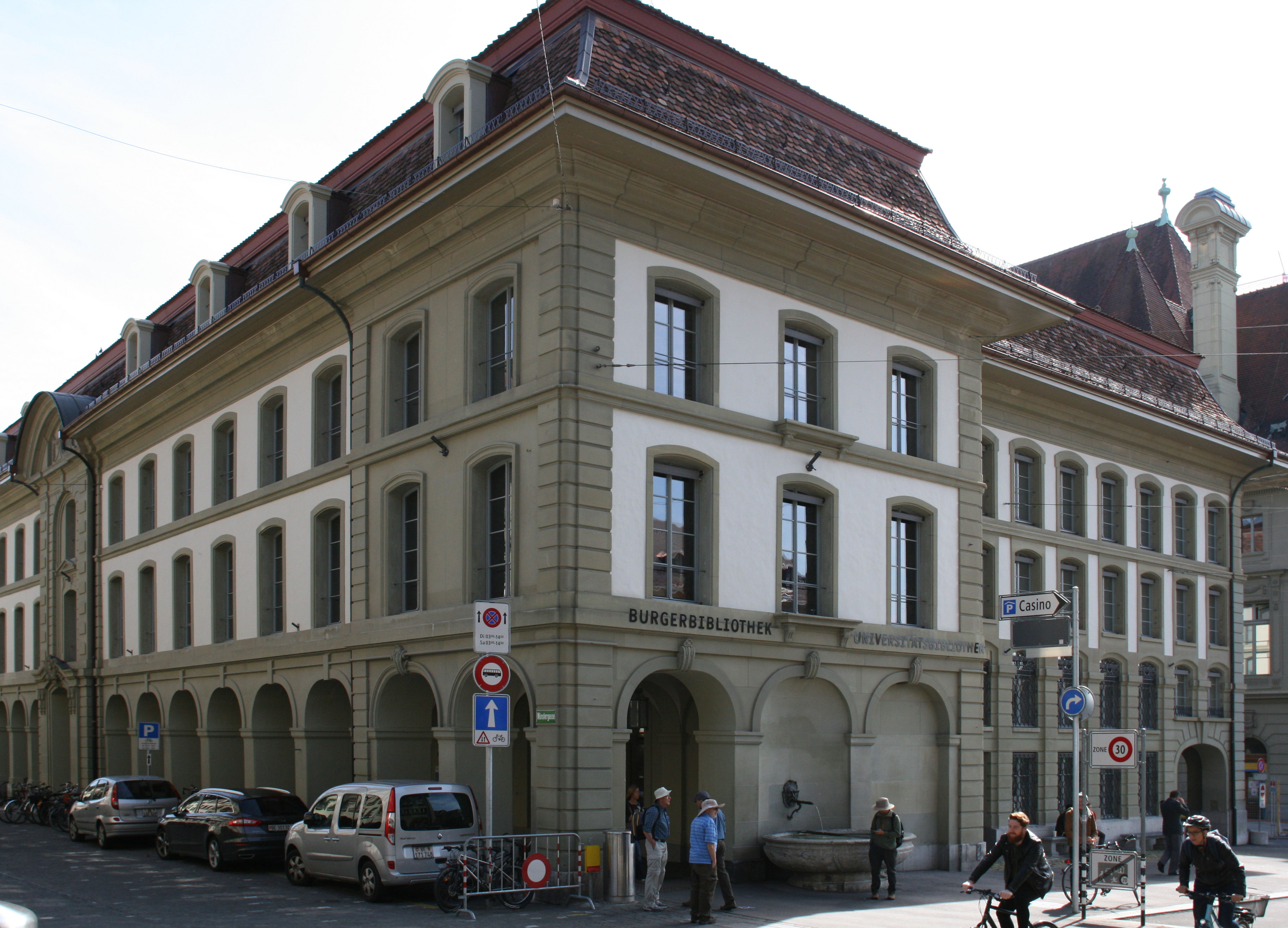
- 46°56′50″N 7°26′54″E
- Location: Bern, Switzerland

Other information
- Website: Official website

The Burgerbibliothek of Berne (German: Burgerbibliothek Bern) is a public library located at Münstergasse 63 in Bern, Switzerland.

The origins of this institution can be traced back to the Reformation. Until 1951 it belonged jointly to the city and the University of Bern, and was supported by the Canton of Bern and by the Community of Burghers of Bern.

The collection of the library includes the illustrated late mediaeval historical chronicle Berner Chronik written by Diebold Schilling the Elder, Liber ad honorem Augusti. It contains about 30 000 pictorial documents about Bern and about 1 000 precious codices, some of them from the late antiquity.

The library includes collections inherited from the following collectors:

- Eduard Bähler
- Philipp Emanuel von Fellenberg
- Jeremias Gotthelf
- Johann Rudolf Gruner
- Kurt Guggisberg (part of inheritance)
- Albrecht von Haller
- Karl Howald
- Ernst Kreidolf
- Rudolf Münger
- Rudolf Abraham von Schiferli
- Gottlieb Samuel Studer
- Rudolf von Tavel
- Gertrud Züricher

== See also ==
- Fragmenta Bernensia
- Bern Riddles
