= Schosshalden cemetery =

Schosshalden Cemetery
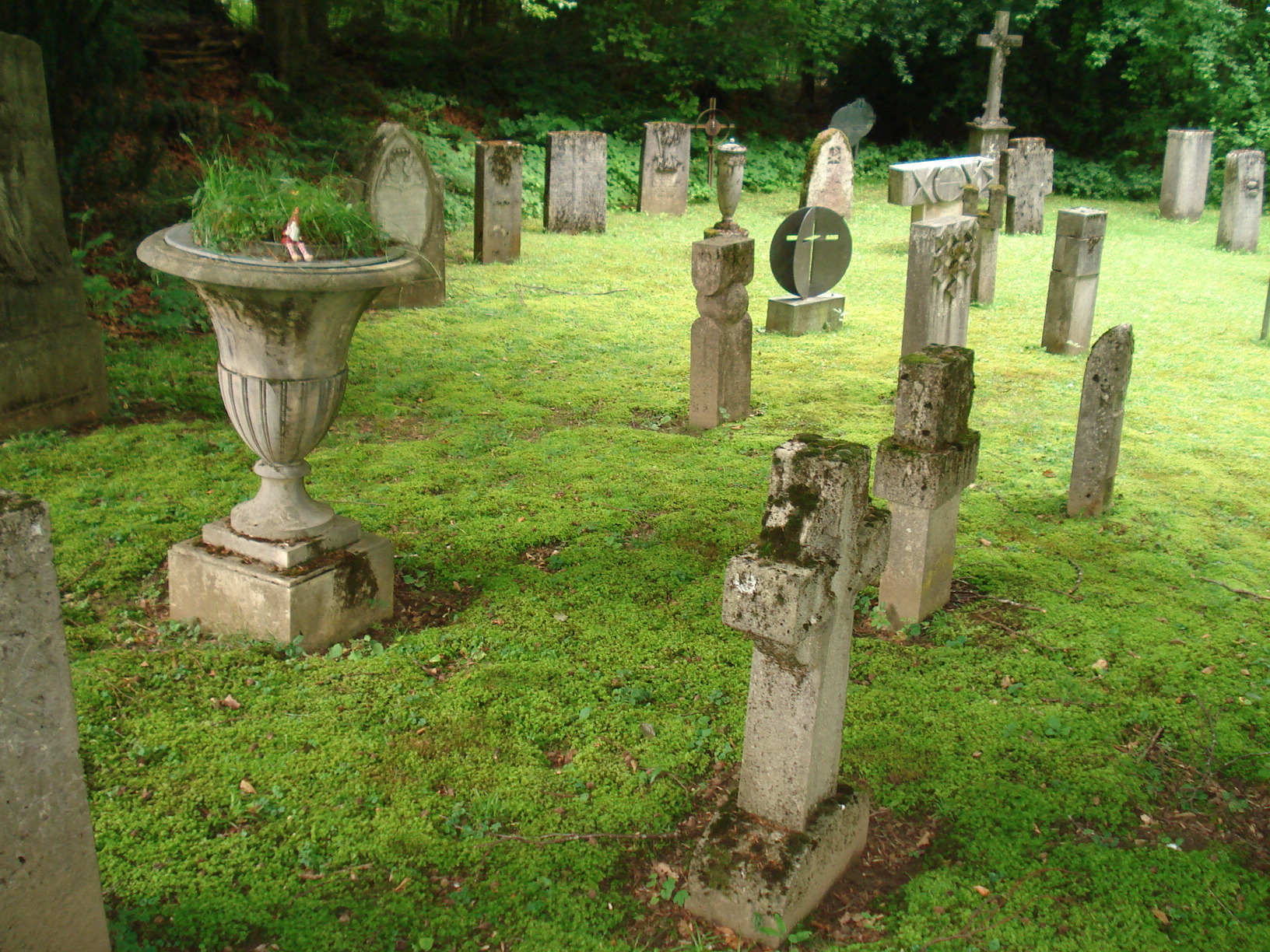
- Interactive map of Schosshalden Cemetery

Details
- Established: 1877
- Location: Bern
- Country: Switzerland
- Coordinates: 46.953°N 7.477°E
- Type: Public, non-denominational
- Website: bern.ch
- Find a Grave: Schosshalden Cemetery

The Schosshalden cemetery (in German: Schosshaldenfriedhof) is a cemetery at Ostermundigenstrasse 116 in Bern.

== Overview ==
It lies on the border to the Ostermundigen municipality, has been opened in 1877 as a replacement for the rose garden and then extended several times. It has rare wild plants, many species of birds, bats and small animals. A nature trail provides information on over 200 trees and shrubs.

The Schosshaldenfriedhof contains the family grave of Paul Klee, with a bronze plaque and the following quote:

I cannot be grasped in the here and now. For I reside just as much with the dead as with the unborn. Somewhat closer to the heart of creation than usual. But not nearly close enough.

The Schosshaldenfriedhof appears in Friedrich Dürrenmatt′s The Judge and His Hangman as the burial place of the murdered fictional character Police Lieutenant ″Ulrich Smith″ (or ″Dr. Prantl″).

== Museum graveyard ==
A museum graveyard (Museumsgrabfeld) has been created within the Schosshalde cemetery in 1980 in order to preserve aesthetically representative gravestones of different epochs. It is considered as Bern′s smallest museum and hosts cultural events.

== Prominent burials ==
=== Existing burials ===
- Erwin Friedrich Baumann (1890–1980), architect and sculptor
- Friedrich Baumann (1835v1910), architect and politician
- Markus Feldmann (1897–1958), Federal Council
- Otto von Greyerz (1863–1940), linguist
- Paul Klee (1879–1940), painter
- Ernst Kreidolf (1863–1956), painter and illustrator
- Eugen Meier (1930–2002), football player
- Marcel Perincioli (1911–2005), sculptor
- Karl Rappan (1905–1996), football player
- Eduard von Steiger (1881–1962), Federal Council
- Rudolf von Tavel (1866–1934), writer

=== Cleared burials ===
- Edward John Granet (1858–1918), British military attache, Bern - reburied in Commonwealth war grave plot at St Martin's Cemetery, Vevey
- Gertrud Kurz (1890–1972), humanist
- Franz Eugen Schlachter (1859–1911), Bible translator
- Adolf Wölfli (1864–1930), painter
