= Felix Hoffmann (illustrator) =

Swiss artist (1911–1975)

- Born: 18 April 1911; Aarau, Switzerland
- Died: 16 June 1975 (aged 64)
- Known for: Book illustration, stained glass, graphic design
- Notable work: A Boy Went Out to Gather Pears (Joggeli wott go Birli schüttle); Bern Minster (stained glass)
- Awards: New York Times Best Illustrated Children's Book (1966)

Felix Hoffmann (18 April 1911 – 16 June 1975) was a Swiss graphic designer, illustrator, and stained glass artist. He is widely regarded as one of the three defining figures of the Swiss picture book tradition in the 20th century, alongside Ernst Kreidolf and Hans Fischer.

Hoffmann illustrated more than 80 books, ranging from literary classics to children's fairy tales. His most acclaimed picture book, Joggeli wott go Birli schüttle (1963) was lauded by the Swiss National Museum in 2018 as a primary subject in the exhibition Joggeli, Pitschi, Globi, which examined the nation's cultural heritage. Its English translation A Boy Went Out to Gather Pears was named a New York Times Best Illustrated Children's Book of the Year upon release in 1966. In the field of fine press, he created the only illustrations for The Magic Mountain that were authorized by the author, Thomas Mann, prior to his death.

Hoffmann was a prolific stained glass artist for Swiss churches. His major commissions include the windows for the Bern Minster and the Stadtkirche Aarau, and frescoes and glasswork for numerous Reformed churches throughout the canton of Aargau.

== Biography ==
Felix Hoffmann was born on 18 April 1911 in Aarau, Switzerland, and died on 16 June 1975.

== Work ==
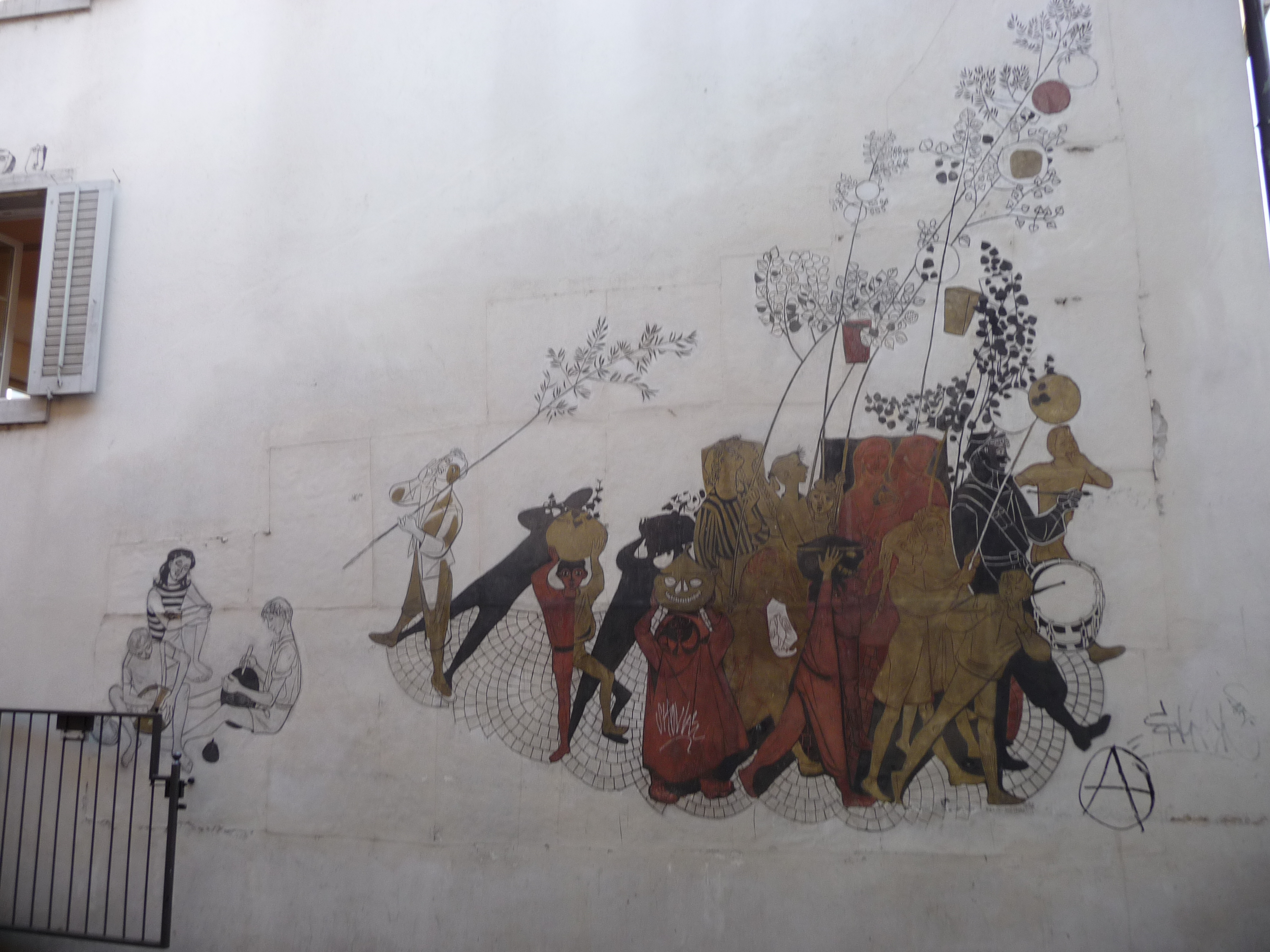
"Fresco Bachfischet" at the Upper Mill, Old Town of Aarau, is no longer at the original site.

=== Stained glass ===
Hoffmann designed stained glass windows for the Bern Minster and the Church of Aarau city (Stadtkirche Aarau). His commissions included frescoes and windows for numerous Reformed churches, including those in Auenstein, Bözen, Kirchberg, and Umiken.

- Church of Aarau city
- Reformed Church Auenstein
- Reformed Church Bözen
- Reformed Church Kirchberg
- Reformed Church Umiken
- Bern Minster

=== Illustrated works ===
Hoffmann illustrated more than 80 books, ranging from literature to children's stories.

Joggeli wott go Birli schüttle is distinguished by Hoffmann's illustration in lithography, and the book's oblong format that allows the narrative to unfold visually across wide page spreads. Its English translation A Boy Went Out to Gather Pears was named a New York Times Best Illustrated Children's Book of the Year upon release in 1966. Between 2018 and 2020, the Swiss National Museum featured it as a primary subject in the exhibition Joggeli, Pitschi, Globi, which examined the most culturally significant Swiss picture books of the century.

He illustrated the Limited Editions Club, including for Thomas Mann's The Magic Mountain (1962). Mann authorized the illustrations prior to his death.

This is a selection of his illustrations for fine press commissions.

- Mann, Thomas (1962). The Magic Mountain. Vol. 2. Illustrated by Felix Hoffmann. The Limited Editions Club.
- Stoker, Bram (1965). Dracula. Illustrated by Felix Hoffmann. The Limited Editions Club.
- Mann, Thomas (1972). Death in Venice. Illustrated by Felix Hoffmann. The Limited Editions Club.
- Longus (1972). Daphnis and Chloe. Illustrated by Felix Hoffmann. The Imprint Society.

This is a selection of his illustrations of children's picture books, including some by the Brothers Grimm.

- The Story of Christmas: A Picture Book
- Hoffmann, Felix (28 September 1966) [1963]. A Boy Went Out to Gather Pears [Joggeli wott go Birli schüttle] (first English ed.). New York City: Harcourt, Brace & World. ISBN 978-0-15-210690-4. OCLC 311258.
- The Sleeping Beauty
- Rapunzel
- The Wolf and the Seven Young Kids
- The Seven Ravens
- Little Red Riding Hood
- Hans in Luck
- Tom Thumb
- King Thrushbeard ("König Drosselbart")
- The Four Clever Brothers
