= Fragmenta Bernensia =

The Codex Bernensis known also as Fragmenta Bernensia, designated by t (traditional system) or 19 (in Beuron system), is a 5th or 6th century Latin manuscript of the New Testament. The text, written on vellum, is a version of the old Latin. The manuscript contains the fragments of the Gospel of Mark (1:2-23; 2:22-27; 3:11-18), on only 2 parchment leaves. Written in two columns per page, 23 lines per column. It is a palimpsest.

The Latin text of the codex is a representative of the Western text-type in Itala recension.

The text of the codex was edited by Hermann Hagen in 1884.

Currently it is housed at the Burgerbibliothek Bern (Cod. 611) in Bern.

== See also ==
- List of New Testament Latin manuscripts
