= Gertrud Kurz =

Swiss humanitarian (1890 – 1972)

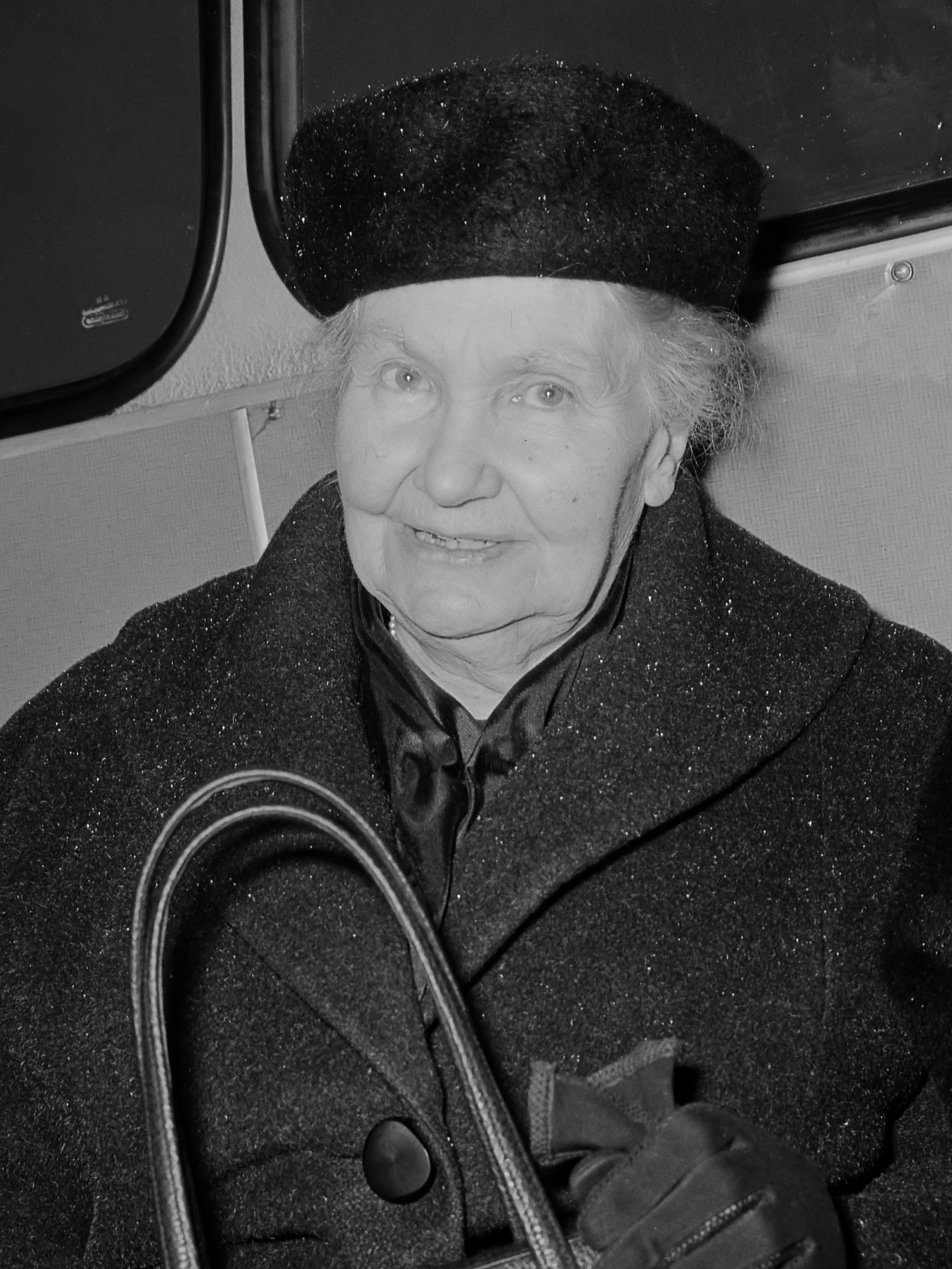
Gertrud Kurz (1965)

Gertrud Kurz (née Hohl; 15 March 1890 – 26 June 1972) was a Swiss humanitarian known for her work in refugee aid and peace activism. For her work in supporting displaced persons during and after World War II, she was nominated multiple times for the Nobel Peace Prize.

== Biography ==
Gertrud Hohl was born in Lutzenberg, Canton of Appenzell Ausserrhoden as the daughter of a textile manufacturer. She grew up in a middle-class household and attended a commercial school in Neuchâtel. Her parents further supported her education at a women's training school in Frankfurt, preparing her for a role as a housewife. In 1912, she married Albert Kurz, the rector of a preparatory school in Bern. In the early years of her marriage, she devoted herself almost entirely to her family, giving birth to two sons and a daughter between 1913 and 1921. At the same time, she engaged in social work, transforming her home in Bern into a refuge for beggars and vagrants. In 1930, she made her first contacts with the international peace movement Crusaders for Peace founded by Etienne Bach and became an active member.

The outbreak of World War II interrupted the international activities of the Crusaders. Kurz saw refugee aid as a continuation of her peace work. In 1938, she organized a Christmas celebration for all refugees in the city of Bern. This event led to the establishment of her own relief organization, the Crusader Refugee Aid. Initially, the organization functioned entirely on a private basis. Kurz hosted refugees in her home and provided help over the phone. The Crusader Refugee Aid soon became a hub for individuals who were not covered by other relief organizations. Its main activities included material aid, intervention with authorities, and public awareness campaigns.

During this time, she published articles on the refugee situation in newspapers and the "Crusader" newsletter. More and more volunteers offered their support. Additional relief organizations were established in Basel, St. Gallen, Zürich, Geneva, and Lausanne. In 1941, the Crusader Refugee Aid was integrated into the Swiss Refugee Council network while remaining a private initiative funded by donations and lecture collections.

During World War II, Kurz received up to thirty letters and numerous visits daily from people seeking help. These direct encounters with persecuted individuals deeply moved her. Her work was primarily motivated by religious compassion. She was open to all refugees and aimed to provide them with a substitute family, creating a place of love and security. She dedicated herself entirely to refugee work and was available almost around the clock. Many letters from refugees thanked her for her "generosity, compassion, and self-sacrifice". Refugees, government officials, and friends alike referred to her as "Mother Kurz".

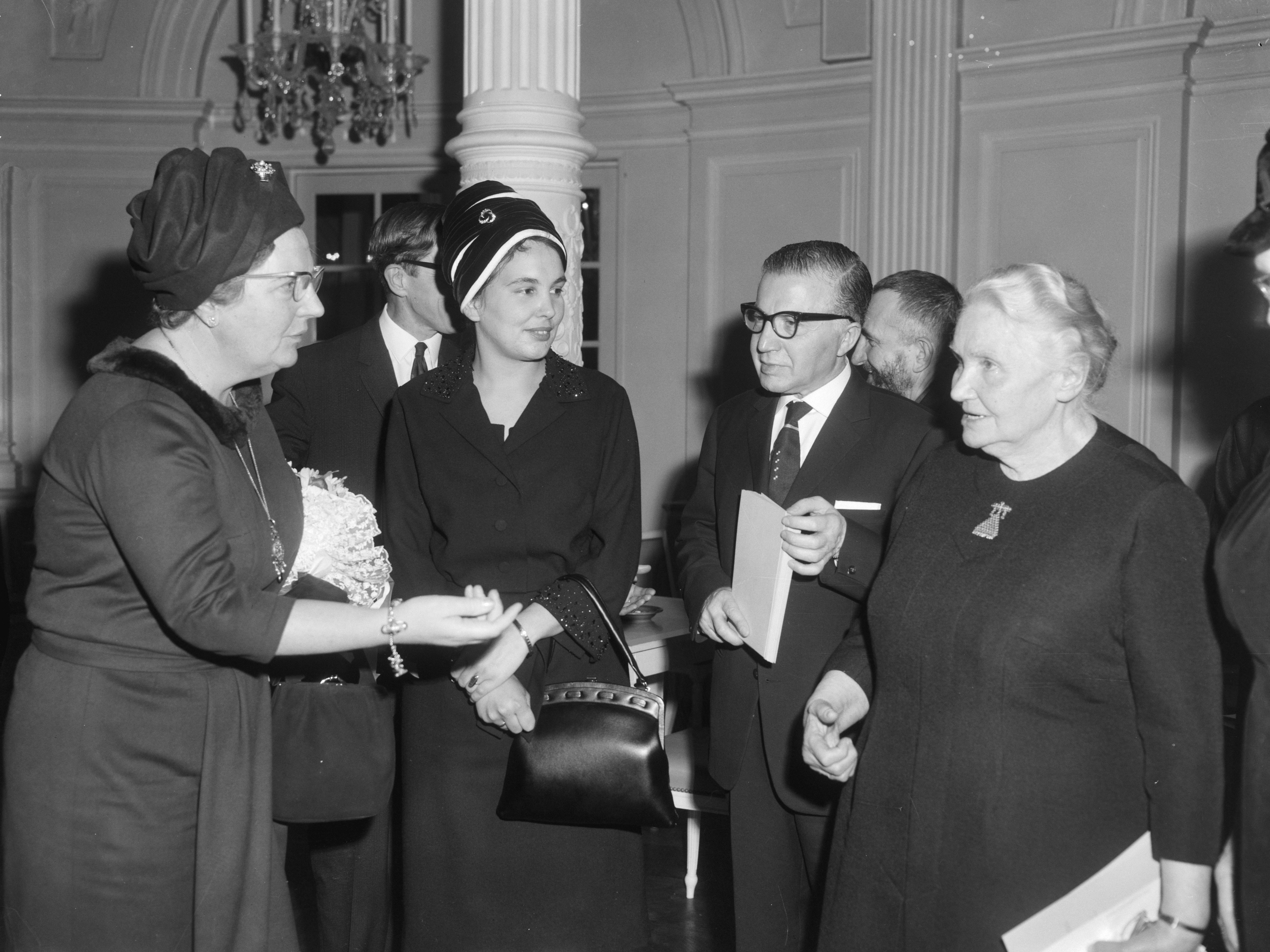
Dutch Queen Juliana (left) and Gertrud Kurz (right) at the 1965 Albert Schweitzer Prize ceremony

Kurz's intervention style was marked by direct engagement with authorities, practical and precise arguments, and appeals to human compassion. She never sought confrontation with officials but demonstrated loyalty and did not question their authority. Through persistent personal conversations, she helped persuade Swiss Federal Councilor Eduard von Steiger to ease restrictions on Jewish refugees. Her good connections with authorities earned her widespread acceptance and significant prestige. She was an important contact for figures such as Karl Barth and relief leaders Paul Vogt and Adolf Freudenberg, from whom she also received valuable information. After World War II, Kurz continued her refugee aid work. This evolved into the Flüchtlingshilfe der Kreuzritter (Crusaders' Refugee Aid), which was affiliated with the Swiss Central Office for Refugee Aid in 1941 and renamed the Christlicher Friedensdienst (cfd) in 1947. The General Assembly approved a name change in May 2023 to Frieda – the Feminist Peace Organisation, which aims to promote the organisation's coherence while maintaining its content and focus.

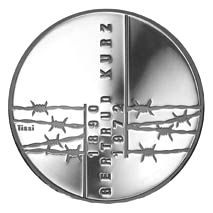
20-franc commemorative coin from 1992

In recognition of her humanitarian work, Kurz was awarded an honorary doctorate by the University of Zurich's Faculty of Theology in 1958, the first woman to receive this honor. In 1965, she received the Albert Schweitzer Prize from Queen Juliana of the Netherlands. The Swiss Federal Council also nominated her for the Nobel Peace Prize, for which she was nominated five times by 1962. In 1992, the Swiss Mint issued a 20-franc commemorative coin in her honor. In September 2022, the Swiss Post issued a commemorative stamp for the 50th anniversary of her death.

Gertrud Kurz was buried in the Schosshalden Cemetery in Bern; her grave has since been removed.

Two years after her death, friends and notable figures, including Alfred A. Häsler and theology professor Hans Ruh, established a foundation to preserve her legacy. The Gertrud Kurz Foundation supports niche projects that promote migrant participation, publishes biannual newsletters, and fosters critical discussion on Swiss migration and asylum policies.

== Works ==
- Im Dienst des Friedens. Johannes Kiefel Verlag, Wuppertal-Barmen 1966. (Inhalt: Entstehung und Aufbau des christlichen Friedensdienstes; Zeichnungen: Robert Eberwein).
