= Edward John Granet =

British Army general

Brigadier-General Edward John Granet CB
- Born: August 1858
- Died: 22 October 1918 (aged 60); Switzerland
- Burial place: St Martin's Cemetery, Vevey
- Military career
- Allegiance: United Kingdom
- Branch: British Army
- Service years: 1878–1918
- Rank: Brigadier-General
- Unit: Royal Artillery
- Conflicts: Second Anglo-Afghan War (1879–1880); Nile Expedition (1884); Second Boer War (1901–1902); First World War (1914–1918)
- Awards: CB

Brigadier-General Edward John Granet CB (August 1858 – 22 October 1918) was a British Army general. He had a long career serving in the field in the Second Anglo-Afghan War and in the 1884 Nile Expedition. He later became a staff officer and served as Deputy Assistant Adjutant General for intelligence in the Second Boer War.

Granet became military attaché to the British Embassy in Rome and Bern in 1911 and played a vital role in providing military intelligence out of Switzerland at the start of the First World War. At his instigation an air raid was carried out by British forces from southern France against a German hydrogen factory and zeppelin depot near to the Swiss border. This was successfully carried out and resulted in severe damage to the facility. Granet returned to action in 1915 commanding the artillery of the 11th (Northern) Division at Gallipoli. On 13 August that year he was severely wounded by an enemy shell. Granet was subsequently placed on half-pay (retirement) due to the severity of his injuries but returned to duty in 1917 when he was re-appointed as military attaché to Bern. He died of his earlier wounds in Switzerland on 22 October 1918, becoming the last British general to die from enemy action in the war.

== Early life and career ==
Granet was born in August 1858 and was the son of William Augustus Granet of Genoa, Kingdom of Sardinia. His brother Sir Guy Granet was a barrister and high ranking railway administrator. Granet was educated at Eton College before joining the British Army's Royal Artillery as a lieutenant in 1878. He served in the Second Anglo-Afghan War between 1879 and 1880 and in the 1884 Nile Expedition. He married Evelyn Pulchérie Chapman (1864–1933) in 1885. Granet was promoted to captain on 29 July 1886. He was seconded from his regiment to the general staff on 1 January 1892, returning on 31 October 1895. Granet was appointed brigade major of the Royal Artillery's Southern district on 18 August 1896 and received promotion to the substantive rank of major on 7 September of that year. Granet was promoted to the brevet rank of lieutenant-colonel on 29 November 1900.

Granet served in the Second Boer War and was mentioned in dispatches on 2 April 1901 by British commander, Lord Roberts. He was appointed Deputy Assistant Adjutant General (DAAG) for intelligence on 28 April 1901 and held that position until 1902. He was in London for the Coronation of King Edward VII and Queen Alexandra on 9 August 1902 and formed part of the King's procession. Granet served with the Army headquarters from 1902 as DAAG and received promotion to the substantive rank of lieutenant-colonel on 9 December 1903. He was promoted to the brevet rank of colonel on 31 July 1904 and returned to the Royal Artillery on 2 April 1905. Granet returned to Army headquarters on 17 November 1906 when he was appointed Assistant Director Remounts (i.e. the supply of horses) and promoted to the substantive rank of colonel. He remained in this role until 17 November 1910 when he was placed on half-pay. Granet was appointed military attaché to the British Embassy in Rome and Bern on 23 February 1911. He was appointed a companion of the Order of the Bath on 19 June 1911 in the Coronation Honours.

== First World War ==
After the outbreak of the First World War Granet's position as attaché became important for intelligence gathering, particularly in Switzerland where he was the primary source of military intelligence in the country. Early in the war he proposed that an air raid be carried out on the German hydrogen factory and zeppelin sheds at Friedrichshafen, near to the Swiss border. This was approved and the subsequent raid was made on 21 November 1914. This was carried out by four British aircraft (Avro 504s) shipped by crate to an airfield in Belfort, France. One plane was damaged on takeoff but the remainder survived German AA fire to drop nine bombs on the facility, for the cost of one aircraft shot down and one pilot captured; the remaining pilots returned safely to Belfort and were awarded the Legion of Honour – the aircraft were shipped back to England shortly afterwards. The hydrogen factory was said to be wrecked and a zeppelin was recorded as probably destroyed, with the raid described by historian Martin Gilbert as a "remarkable feat of aerial initiative". A complaint was received from Switzerland that their territory had been overflown but this was strongly denied by the First Lord of the Admiralty, Winston Churchill. A further complaint regarding the loss of a Swiss citizen working at the factory was dismissed by Churchill who said that "it serves him right". Although substantial damage was claimed at the time and in some later histories, the damage inflicted was slight.

Granet's appointment as military attaché ended in January 1915 and he returned to the Royal Artillery, where he was appointed to the temporary rank of brigadier-general on 18 March and given command of the artillery units of the 11th (Northern) Division. He fought with his unit at Gallipoli later that year. Whilst in a trench at Lala Baba Hill on 13 August he was badly wounded in the hands and face by gravel from an exploding Turkish shell. The shell is thought to have been a stray, falling short of its intended target – the British fleet in Suvla Bay. Granet was evacuated and returned to half-pay on 7 November 1916 owing to the severity of his wounds. He was appointed an officer of the Order of Saints Maurice and Lazarus by the Italian king and on 26 May 1917 was authorised to wear the decorations of that order by George V. Granet recovered enough to be reappointed as military attaché to Stockholm on 4 June 1917, transferring back to Bern the following year. He died of his wounds on 22 October 1918 and was buried initially at Schosshalden cemetery in Bern but after the war he was reburied, with other British service dead from elsewhere in Switzerland in the Commonwealth war graves plot in St Martin's Cemetery, Vevey (Plot 53, Grave 60A). He was the last British general to die as a result of enemy action during the war, which ended on 11 November 1918.
