= Rudolf von Tavel =

Swiss journalist and writer (1866–1934)

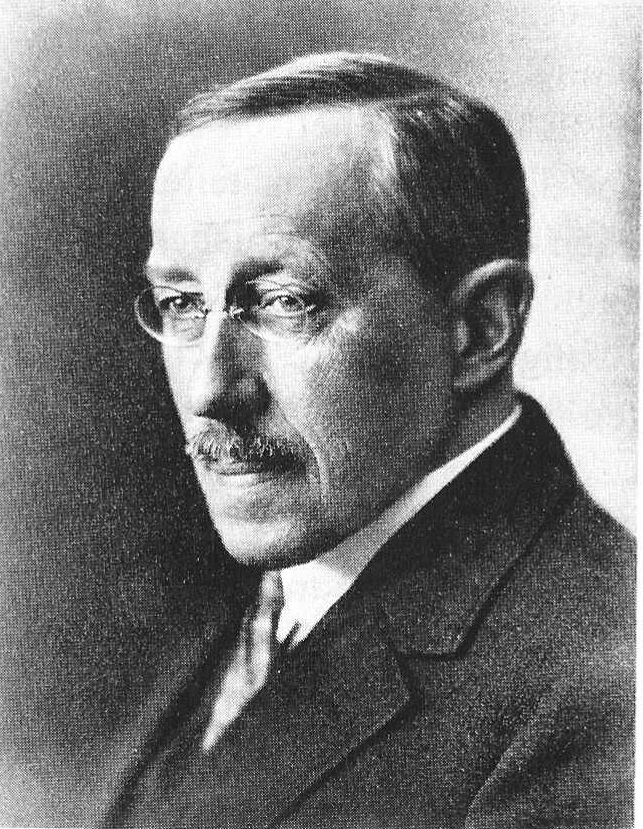
Rudolf von Tavel

Otto Friedrich Rudolf von Tavel (21 December 1866 – 18 October 1934 in Bern) was a Swiss journalist and writer. Many of his novels were written in Bernese rather than Standard German, and he is one of the best-known authors in that language.

== Life ==
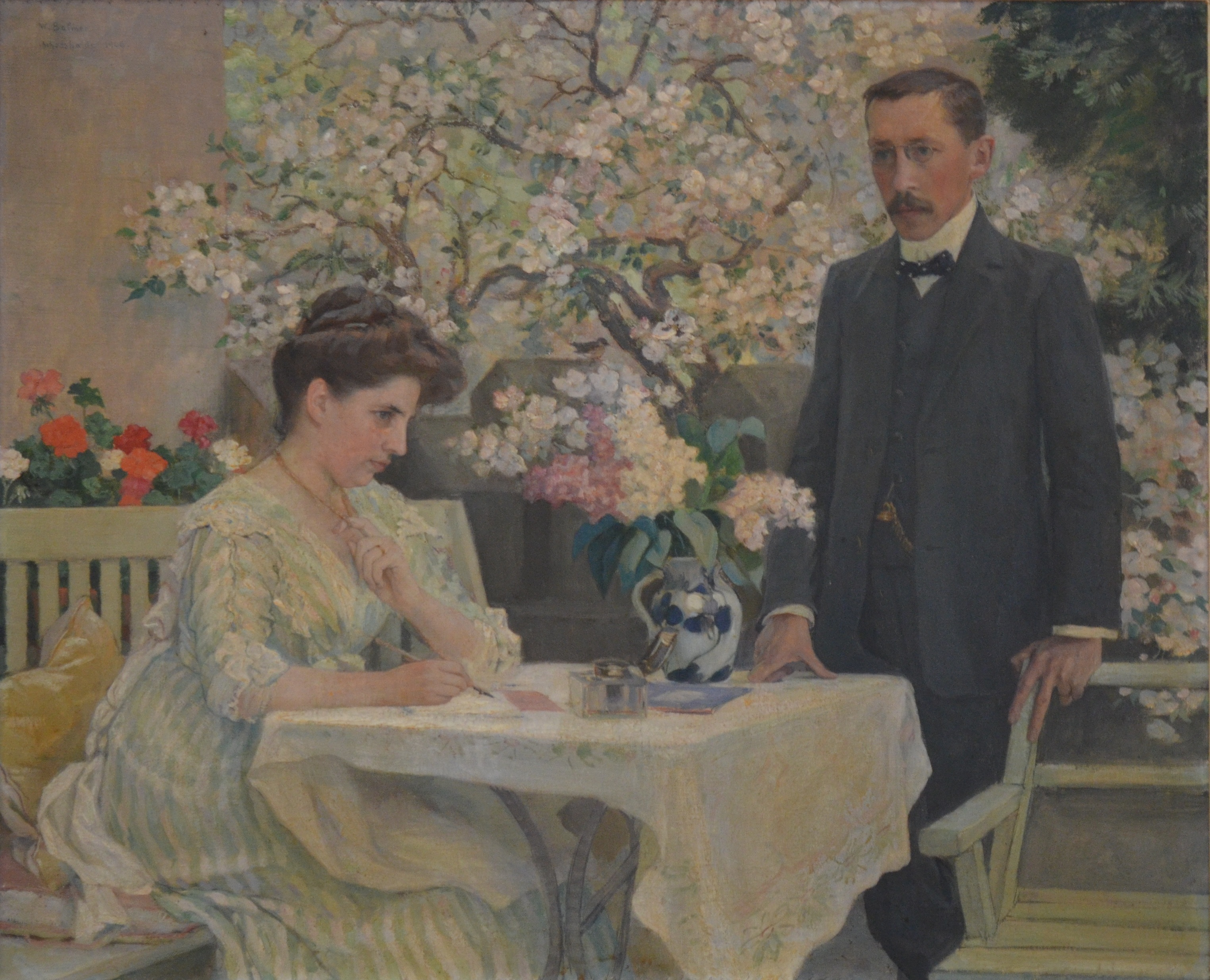
Adèle and Rudolf von Tavel-Stettler. Portrait by Wilhelm Balmer (1909)

Rudolf von Tavel was the youngest of six children of an old Bernese patrician family. He spent his youth in conservative circles of the city. He studied jurisprudence and cameralism in Lausanne, Leipzig, Berlin, and received his doctorate in Heidelberg in 1891. He then worked for the Berner Tagblatt (a forerunner of the Berner Zeitung) until 1916, and from 1896 to 1905 served as director of the Swiss Mobiliar insurance company. On 10 May 1894 he married Adele Stettler (1874-1966); the marriage was childless.

In the Swiss army, von Tavel obtained the rank of battalion commander. During the First World War he worked closely with Hermann Hesse in the care of prisoners of war. From 1902 to 1912 he was a member of the Bern city council (Stadtrat) for the Conservative-Democratic Party. He was a member of the Federation of Swiss Protestant Churches and several non-profit organizations.

From 1920 he lived as a freelance writer on his estate on the outskirts of Bern. He died of a stroke in 1934. His grave is in the Schosshalden cemetery. In 2003, the Rudolf von Tavel Foundation was established in Bern.

== Publications ==
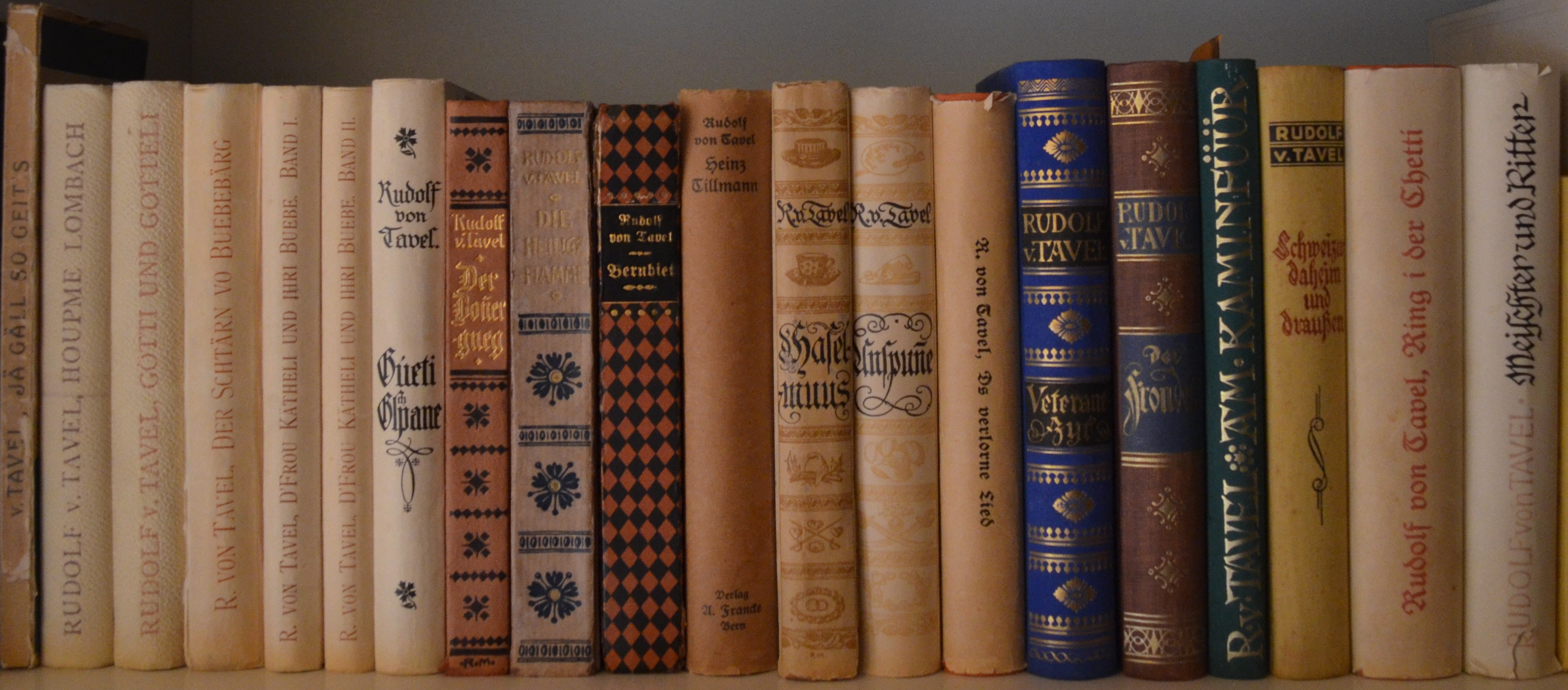
First editions of Von Tavel's novels

Von Tavel wrote predominantly in Bernese German, a dialect of the Alemannic language. His novels are still among the most widely read works in Swiss German. His collection is maintained in the Burgerbibliothek of Bern.

=== Novels and novellas ===
- «Jä gäll, so geit’s»: E luschtigi Gschicht uus truuriger Zyt, 1901
- Der Houpme Lombach, 1903
- Götti und Gotteli, 1906
- Der Stärn vo Buebebärg: E Gschicht us de trüebschte Tage vom alte Bärn, 1907
- D’Frou Kätheli und ihri Buebe, 1910
- Gueti Gschpane, 1913
- Der Donnergueg: E Liebesgschicht us stille Zyte, 1916
- Die heilige Flamme: Eine Erzählung aus dem Bernerland, 1917 (hochdeutsch)
- Heinz Tillmann, 1919 (Standard German)
- D’Haselmuus: E Gschicht us em Undergang vom alte Bärn, 1922
- Unspunne: Wie’s der Haselmuus wyter ergangen isch, 1924
- Ds verlorne Lied, 1926
- Veteranezyt, 1927
- Der Frondeur: Berndeutscher Roman aus dem 17. Jahrhundert, 1929
- Ring i der Chetti: E Läbesgschicht, 1931
- Meischter und Ritter, 1933

=== Short stories ===
- D' Glogge vo Nüechterswyl: E Gschicht usem Bärnbiet, 1917
- Bernbiet: Alte und neue Erzählungen, 1918 (Standard German)
- Simeon und Eisi, 1922
- Am Kaminfüür: Bärndütschi Gschichte, 1928
- Amors Rache, 1930
- Schweizer daheim und draussen: Novellen, 1932
- Uf d Liebi chunnt's alleini a: Mit Rudolf von Tavel in das 18. Jahrhundert, 2007 (story collection, with glossary)

=== Plays ===
- Di gfreutischti Frou: E Komedi i 3 Akte, 1923
- Zwöierlei Schatzig: Bauernkomödie in 2 Aufzügen, 1926

=== Non-fiction ===
- Die wichtigsten Änderungen in der Lebenshaltung der schweizerischen Hochgebirgsbewohner im Laufe des XIX. Jahrhunderts. Eine wirtschaftspolitische Abhandlung, dissertation, Heidelberg 1891
- Theodorich von Lerber: Ein Lebensbild, 1911
- Bern, seinen Besuchern geschildert, 1914
- Von grosser Arbeit: Kraftwerk und Stausee von Mühleberg in ihrer Entstehung, 1921
- Kraft und Herrlichkeit: Festschrift auf die Feier des neunzigjährigen Bestehens des Diakonissenhauses Bern-Bad Ems und "Jerusalem" Hamburg, 1934
- Vom Wert der Tradition, 1935
