= Well Loved Tales =

Well Loved Tales was a series of illustrated re-tellings of fairy tales and other traditional stories published by Ladybird between 1964 and the early 1990s. The books were labelled as "easy reading" and were graded depending on such aspects as their length, complexity and vocabulary. Most of the stories in the series were based on stories by Hans Christian Andersen, the Brothers Grimm and Charles Perrault, alongside a number of traditional English folk tales such as Jack and the Beanstalk and The Three Little Pigs. The first title in the series was Cinderella, and over the next decade, twenty seven titles were published, all written by Vera Southgate. In 1979, with the publication of The Ugly Duckling, Pinocchio and Tom Thumb in the series, the look and format of the books changed. The books universally featured a green spine and back cover, as well as a standard logo. The series also broke with the Ladybird tradition of having a left page of just text and a right page of just picture, and the illustrations became more stylised than the previous editions. Older titles were gradually re-illustrated over the years. Under this new look, even more titles retold by a variety of different editors and authors came to be added over the course of the 1980s, with popular stories including Hansel and Gretel, The Little Mermaid and The Wizard of Oz.

The series gradually went out of print in the early 1990s, yet the current "Ladybird Tales" series has reused some of the original "Well Loved Tales" texts.

== Reception ==
Titles in the series were translated into many different languages including Arabic, German and French. Eventually sales in the series sold upwards of 80 million copies worldwide. The older books have been known to fetch quite high prices on the secondhand market; for example, first editions of "Cinderella" with a dust jacket have been known to go for as much as £150.

Perhaps due to the nostalgia for some of the earlier titles in the series, later editions with more stylised illustrations are often held by some with lesser regard. Equally, the original editions of the 1960s and 1970s have been criticised for their illustrations for being lifeless and not leaving much to the imagination. Equally, some have raised concerns over the drastic abridging of longer stories such as Pinocchio and the right to retelling distinctly literary fairy tales with a clear author such as Hans Christian Andersen.

== List of tales published in the series ==
- The Elves and the Shoemaker
- The Three Little Pigs
- The Gingerbread Boy (narrated by Nigel Pegram)
- The Little Red Hen
- The Princess and the Pea
- The Sly Fox and the Little Red Hen
- Three Billy Goats Gruff
- Chicken Licken
- The Enormous Turnip
- Goldilocks and the Three Bears
- The Magic Porridge Pot
- The Big Pancake (narrated by John Baddeley)
- The Old Woman and her Pig
- The Ugly Duckling (narrated by John Baddeley)
- The Emperor's New Clothes
- Thumbelina (narrated by John Baddeley)
- Town Mouse and Country Mouse
- The Tinderbox (narrated by Roger Blake)
- The Twelve Dancing Princesses
- Sleeping Beauty
- Dick Whittington and His Cat
- Puss in Boots
- Rumpelstiltskin
- Rapunzel
- The Wolf and the Seven Young Kids
- Little Red Riding Hood
- The Musicians of Bremen
- Pinocchio
- The Golden Goose
- Hansel and Gretel
- The Goose Girl
- The Brave Little Tailor
- The Emperor and the Nightingale
- Pied Piper of Hamelin (narrated by Roger Blake)
- Cinderella
- Jack and the Beanstalk
- Beauty and the Beast
- Snow White and Rose Red
- Snow White and the Seven Dwarfs
- The Princess and the Frog (narrated by John Baddeley)
- Tom Thumb
- The Little Mermaid
- The Sorcerer's Apprentice (narrated by Nigel Pegram)
- The Snow Queen
- The Wizard of Oz
- The Firebird
- Peter and the Wolf

== Well Loved Tales on VHS ==
VHS title	Release date	Presenter(s)
Well Loved Tales - Chicken Licken, Town Mouse and Country Mouse and The Little Red Hen	14 November 1988	Christopher Biggins
Well Loved Tales - Cinderella and The Tinder Box (LPV 8269)	14 November 1988	Judi Dench
Well Loved Tales - Dick Whittington and his Cat and The Goose Girl (LPV 8268)	14 November 1988	Paula Wilcox
Well Loved Tales - Little Red Riding Hood and The Golden Goose	14 November 1988	Gemma Craven
Well Loved Tales - Rapunzel and Beauty and the Beast	14 November 1988	Una Stubbs
Well Loved Tales - Rumpelstiltskin and The Emperor's New Clothes (LPV 8273)	14 November 1988	Shirley Cheriton and Sam Howard
Well Loved Tales - The Bold Little Tailor and Jack and the Beanstalk (LPV 8257)	14 November 1988	Ron Moody
Well Loved Tales - The Emperor and the Nightingale and The Firebird	14 November 1988	Shirley Cheriton and Sam Howard
Well Loved Tales - The Little Mermaid and Tom Thumb (LPV 8260)	14 November 1988	Jan Francis
Well Loved Tales - The Pied Piper of Hamelin and The Sorcerer's Apprentice (LPV 8259)	14 November 1988	Ron Moody
Well Loved Tales - The Princess and the Pea and The Princess and the Frog (LPV 8261)	14 November 1988	Tim Brooke-Taylor
Well Loved Tales - The Snow Queen and Snow White and the Seven Dwarfs (LPV 8256)	14 November 1988	Una Stubbs
Well Loved Tales - The Three Little Pigs and The Wolf and the Seven Little Kids	14 November 1988	Jonathon Morris
Well Loved Tales - The Wizard of Oz and the Three Billy Goats Gruff (LPV 8266)	14 November 1988	Paul Jones
