= Lisa Wenger =

Swiss artist, writer (1858–1941)

- Portrait of Lisa Wenger, 1917 by Paul Basilius Barth
- Born: Lisa Ruutz; 23 January 1858; Bern, Switzerland
- Died: 17 October 1941; Carona, Switzerland
- Occupation(s): Artist; Author of children's books
- Spouse: Théo Wenger (1868–1928)
- Children: Ruth Wenger (1897–1994)
- Parent(s): Heinrich Ruutz; Elise Haller

Lisa Wenger (born Lisa Ruutz; 23 January 1858 – 17 October 1941) was a Swiss painter and writer of children's books. During the 1930s she was one of the best known and most widely read authors in the country.

== Life ==
Lisa Ruutz was born in Bern. Heinrich Ruutz, her father, owned a fabrics and textiles shop in Basel. She undertook artistic training successively in Basel, Paris and Florence, finishing off at the Fine Arts Academy in Düsseldorf. Her teachers in Basel, included Hans Sandreuter. In 1881 Lisa Ruutz opened a porcelain painting workshop, targeted on women and young ladies in Basel.

In 1890 she married Théo Wenger, the owner of a "steel goods" factory. That involved relocating to Delémont which at the time was still in the Canton of Bern (although the call for cantonal borders that more closely reflected language frontiers was already a longstanding cause of agitation). It was only on reaching the age of 46, after establishing herself at nearby Courtételle, that she embarked on the career for which she is today better remembered, as a children's author.

After 1919 Lisa and Théo Wenger became regular visitors to Carona (Lugano) in Ticino, members of the little informal summer season writers and artists' colony surrounding the author Hermann Hesse who moved to Lugano after the war. Their daughter Ruth Wenger (1897-1994) became a particularly welcome guest at the "Casa Costanza" (identified in less respectful sources as "the parrot house"). Eventually, in 1924, Ruth Wenger married Hermann Hesse. Ruth was twenty years younger than her husband and her first marriage was of short duration: the family attachment to Ticino appears to have lasted better, since it was at Carona that Lisa Wenger died in the autumn/fall of 1941.

== Published output (selection) ==
- Das blaue Märchenbuch 1905
- Wie der Wald still ward, animal story 1906
- Joggeli söll ga Birli schüttle, 1908
- Prüfungen, novel 1908
- Die Wunderdoktorin, novel 1909
- Der Kampf um die Kanzel, short story 1911
- Amoralische Fabeln, 1920
- Baum ohne Blätter, 1938
- Das Zeichen. Ein Schauspiel in drei Akten, 1914
- Der Garten. Erzählungen aus dem Tessin, 1924
- Der Vogel im Käfig, novel 1922
- Der Waldfrevler, 1919
- Die Altweibermühle. Zehn Frauenmärchen, 1921
- Die drei gescheiten Männer von Au. Vetter Jeremias and die Schwestern Tanzeysen., novels 1919
- Die Longway und ihre Ehen., novel 1930
- Die Wunderdoktorin, novel 1910
- Eine Heimkehr
- Elisabeth sucht Gott, 1941
- Er und Sie und das Paradies, 1918
- Es schwärs Warte. Einakter, 1930
- Hans-Peter Ochsner., novel 1955
- Licht und Schatten in San Marto, novel 1940
- Oh wie bös, oh nit so bös: die Geschichte vom Mannli und vom Fraueli, 1946
- s Zeiche: ein Schauspiel in drei Akten, 1916
- Verenas Hochzeit, 1939
- Vier junge Musikanten erleben Abenteuer. Zeichnungen von Fritz Deringer. Schweizerisches Jugendschriftenwerk 1940, SJW-Issue Nr. 88
- Was mich das Leben lehrte: Gedanken und Erfahrungen, 1927
- Wie der Wald still ward, 1907
- Aber, aber Kristinli. Schweizerisches Jugendschriftenwerk 1935, SJW-Issue Nr. 48, Jubiläumsausgabe-Reprint 2006 with illustrations by Meret Oppenheim, ISBN 3-7269-0520-0
