= Ernst Kreidolf =

Swiss painter

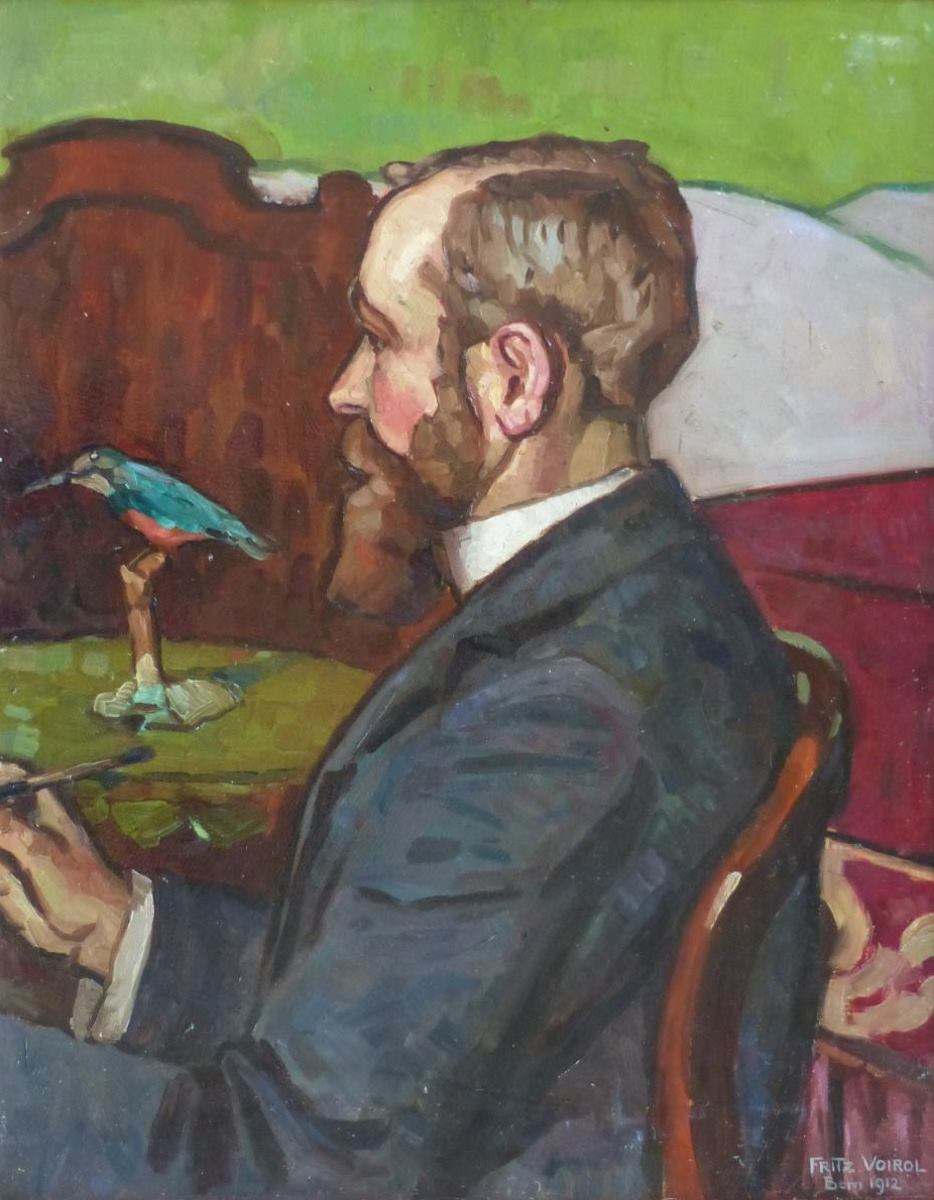
- Portrait of a painter friend, 1912 (possibly of Ernst Kreidolf) by Fritz Voirol, a Swiss landscape painter
- Born: Konrad Ernst Theophil Kreidolf; 9 February 1863; Berne, Switzerland
- Died: 12 August 1956 (aged 93); Berne, Switzerland
- Education: Lithographische Anstalt Schmidt-Pecht (1882); Kunstgewerbeschule (1883-1885); Akademie der Bildenden Künste München (1887 - discontinued)
- Known for: Painting
- Movement: Jugendstil

Ernst Kreidolf or Konrad Ernst Theophil Kreidolf (9 February 1863 – 12 August 1956) was a Swiss painter largely known for illustrating children's books about flower fairies.

== Early life and education ==
Konrad Ernst Theophil Kreidolf, the second eldest child of the Kreidolf family, was born on 9 February 1863 in Berne, Switzerland.

The family relocated to Konstanz in Germany, where his father opened a toy shop. Ernst Kreidolf was raised by his grandparents in Tägerwilen, Switzerland. In Konstanz, he began an apprenticeship as a lithographer at the Lithographische Anstalt Schmidt-Pecht (Lithographic Institute JA Pecht) while simultaneously studying drawing. Following the completion of his apprenticeship, Kreidolf kept working for Schmidt-Pecht as an assistant in order to provide for his family following the bankruptcy of his parents' shop.

In Munich, he attended the Kunstgewerbeschule. He supplemented his income by working as a lithographic draftsman. Beginning in 1885, he studied art at Paul Nauen's private art school. On his second application in 1887, the Akademie der Bildenden Künste München accepted Kreidolf as a student. He studied under Gabriel von Hackl and Ludwig von Löfftz.

== Career ==
He was a leading figure in the Jugendstil movement. His work as picture books demonstrates a high level of technical proficiency as well as exact botanical and zoological knowledge. Almost all of his illustrations include animals and plants given human characteristics.

Kreidolf's work often features dogs in significant or prominent roles. The Dachshund belonging to Kreidolf's friend and author Leopold Weber, whom he met in Partkirchen, served as inspiration for a large number of quite varied sketches, watercolors, paintings, and a whole illustrated book.

== Death ==
Kreidolf died on 12 August 1956 in Berne. He is interred in Bern's Schosshalden cemetery.

== Gallery ==
Works of Ernst Kreidolf
Tägerwilen in 1883: overall view from the southwest (with marginal vignettes). Photographed and lithographed from nature by Ernst Kreidolf
