= The Eight Hilarious Gods =

1993 Hong Kong film by Jeffrey Chiang

- Official poster
- Chinese: 笑八仙
- Jyutping: Siu^{3} Baat^{3} Sin^{1}
- Directed by: Jeffrey Chiang
- Screenplay by: Shui Lung
- Produced by: Hung Siu Lai
- Starring: Rosamund Kwan; Adam Cheng; Sandra Ng; Deric Wan; Ng Man-tat; Lawrence Cheng; Shing Fui-On; Peter Lai; Lau Shun
- Cinematography: Wong Kar Fai
- Edited by: Wong Ming Gong
- Music by: William Wu Wai Lap
- Production company: Crown Film
- Release date: 18 November 1993
- Running time: 87 minutes
- Country: Hong Kong
- Language: Cantonese

The Eight Hilarious Gods is a 1993 Hong Kong fantasy mo lei tau film directed by Jeffrey Chiang. The main characters are the Eight Immortals in Taoism. But being a comedy film, most are portrayed as crooks.

== Plot ==
Goddess Buddy Wall ascends to the mortal world to retrieve the holy pearls that Lucifer stole. She saves a group of villagers from sacrificing one of their children to Lucifer by posing as one. When she cannot win, she calls upon god Ben who manages to chase Lucifer away. To defeat Lucifer, the two embark on a journey to find the other six gods who were reincarnated into mortals; they are identified by a birthmark on their body.

Arriving in a town, the film introduces the reincarnated gods as mortals who are unaware of their celestial identities: Smart Han and Lousy Han are con artists, homosexual Cheung and Lotus are swindlers that run a hostel, and Lee and Tsao are employee and employer respectively for bounty hunting. Buddy Wall and Ben first meet con artists Smart Han and Lousy Han who tries to pickpocket Buddy Wall in the flea market; Ben beats them but is sidetracked when beautiful women come to watch him fight. The two meet Lee and Tsao when Lee physically abuses his mother to steal her jade bracelet to give to Tsao to pay off a debt. The two check into Cheung and Lotus' hostel as Lotus tries to seduce Ben.

That evening, Lucifer claims a young boy's life in retaliation for the humans sending the gods after him, and demands the sacrifices of three boys and girls in three days. At the hostel, all of the mortal gods have unknowingly gathered there. Lotus captures the mortal gods, except Smart Han, and she fights against Ben who has been suspicious of her intentions. Cheung, Lotus' partner in crime and in love with Tsao, is lured into where they are kept and knocked unconscious, allowing the captives to escape. All of the mortal gods unite, where Ben is forced to pardon their mortal crimes and ask for their help in locating the other 6 gods to fight Lucifer. Surprisingly, they all reveal their marks, indicating that they are the gods that he and Buddy Wall had been looking for. However, the group is skeptical of their celestial origins.

They see a group of villagers, marching to sacrifice three boys and girls to Lucifer. The gods promises to save the children in three days time. However, within the three days, the mortal gods dilly-dallies while Lucifer takes the initiative to break them apart by transforming as every one of them to fool the others. Ben reveals the true Lucifer but the mortal gods are disorganized and scattered, whereby Ben and Buddy Wall are captured.

The rest of the injured mortal gods reunite outside of the city and try to rescue Ben and Buddy Wall, but it costs them their lives. During a lunar eclipse, Lucifer tries to consume the holy pearls but they escape to possess their respective mortals, properly reviving and turning them into gods. With their powers united, they restrain Lucifer and burn him in his own tower of pyre. They then cross a large body of water back to their home island of fairies.

== Cast and characters ==
- Sandra Ng as Lam Choi-wo "Buddy Wall"
- Adam Cheng as Lui Dung-ban "Ben"
- Deric Wan as Hon Seung-zi "Smart Han"
- Ng Man-tat as Hon Zung-lei "Lousy Han"
- Lawrence Cheng as Cheung Gwo-lou "Cheung"
- Rosamund Kwan as Ho Sin-gu "Lotus"
- Shing Fui-On as Tit-gwai Lee "Lee"
- Peter Lai as Tsou Gwok-kau "Tsao"
- Lau Shun 劉洵 as Lucifer
