= Lan Caihe =

One of the Eight Taoist Immortals

Lan Caihe 藍采和
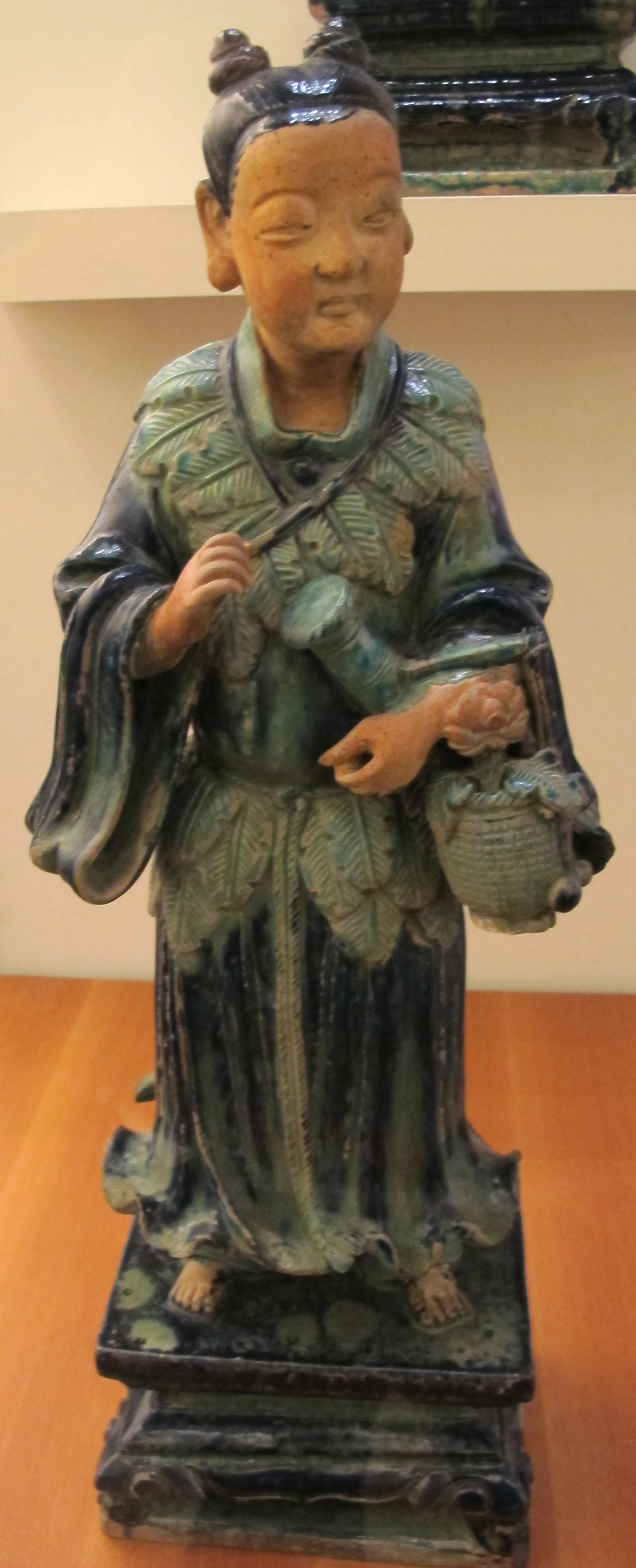
- Ming dynasty figurine of Lan Caihe, depicted as a young adult wearing long robes and leaves, and carrying a basket. Circa 1510 CE.
- Traditional Chinese: 藍采和
- Simplified Chinese: 蓝采和
Transcriptions
Standard Mandarin
- Hanyu Pinyin: Lán Cǎihé
- Wade–Giles: Lan Ts'ai-ho
Yue: Cantonese
- Yale Romanization: Làahm Chói Wòh
- Jyutping: Laam4 Coi2 Wo4

Lan Caihe (Chinese: 藍采和; pinyin: Lán Cǎihé; Wade–Giles: Lan Ts'ai-ho) is a Chinese mythological figure, and one of the Eight Immortals in the Taoist pantheon. Lan's presence in this group makes Lan one of the more familiar of the hundreds of other Taoist immortals. Lan Caihe is the only one of the Eight Immortals whose gender is ambiguous. Lan is not generally thought to be based on a historical person, but is traditionally said to have been born sometime during the Tang dynasty (618 to 907 CE), and lived as a homeless street entertainer, who wandered all over China, singing philosophical songs. Stories vary about how Lan attained immortality and became one of the Eight Immortals. Lan's emblem is a basket of flowers, and so this immortal is considered the patron of florists and gardeners.

== Name and epithets ==
According to the Hsiu hsiang Pa Hsien tung yu chi, epithets of Lan Caihe include "the Red-footed Great Genius," Ch’ih-chiao Ta-hsien incarnate. Lan was also called the "foot-stomping immortal," which was a reference to the genre of music that Lan performed, "stomping songs," which are described further below.

Sometimes Lan Caihe's personal name is said to have been Mu Dan Xian Nu (not to be confused with a famous general with that name who died in 606 CE). As such, the name "Lan Caihe" is understood to be a chosen name, or a name in religion.

== Gender ==
Different writers and artists portray this immortal as an intersex person, a man, a woman, a man who looks like a woman, an androgynous person, or someone who appears as—or dresses as—different genders at different times.

Chinese theatre portrays Lan as wearing feminine clothes, but speaking in a masculine voice, that is, by a male actor wearing a feminine dress without attempting a feminine style of speech. The Kai yü ts'ung k'ao (陔餘叢考) holds the view that Lan was male, and having him dress as a woman in contemporary plays was a "highly ridiculous" error.

He Xiangu is always described as the only woman among the Eight Immortals, which suggests that Lan Caihe is not a woman. According to the Xiu Xiang Ba Xian Dong You Ji (Wade–Giles: Hsiu hsiang Pa Hsien tung yu chi) (東遊記), Lan Caihe was a man who could not understand how to be a man. This could explain why Lan Caihe is sometimes seen as a woman or otherwise.

== Appearance ==
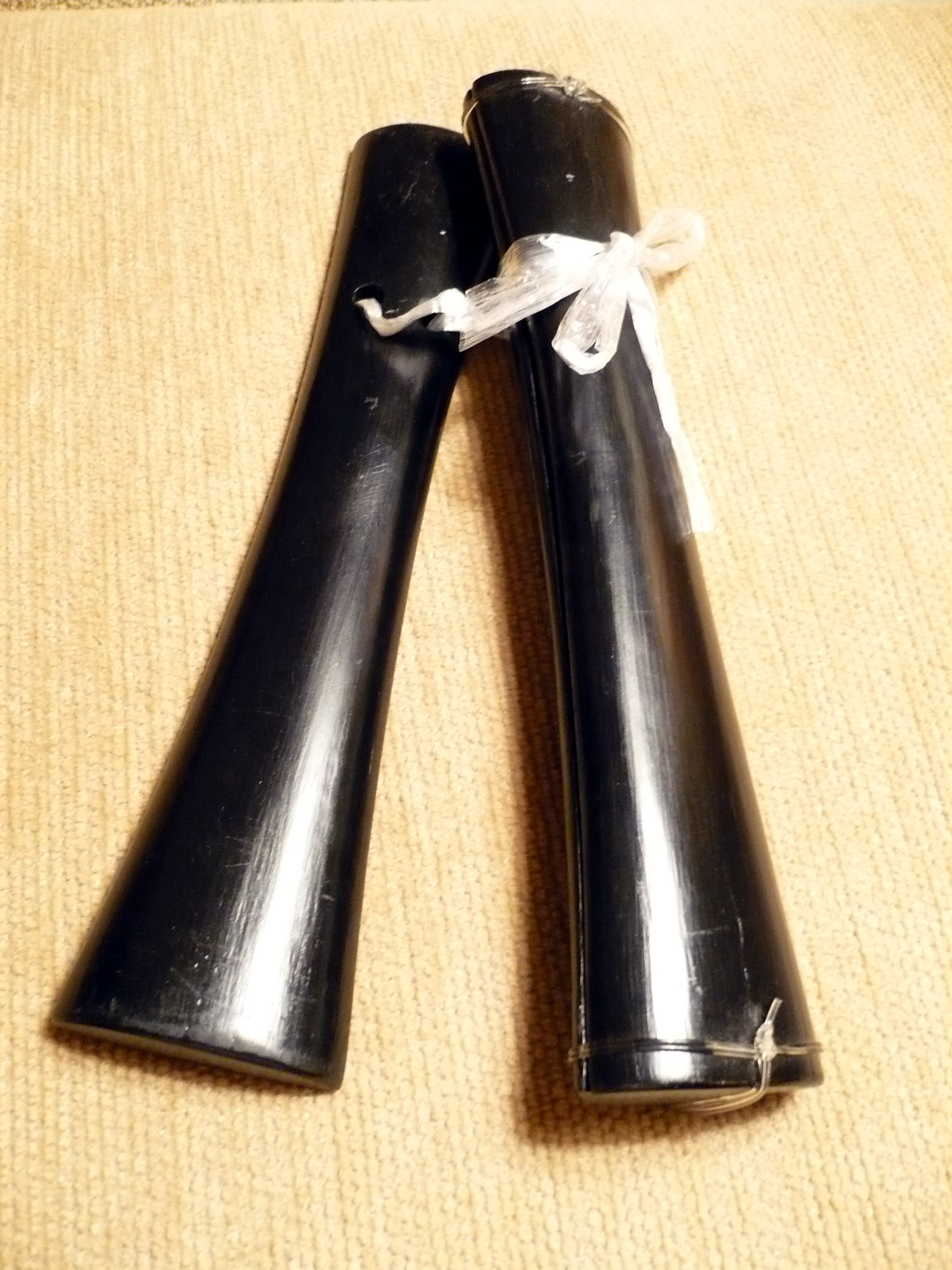
One type of clapper is used in Chinese music. Lan Caihe is sometimes pictured holding clappers similar to these.

As an immortal, Lan's apparent physical age is uncertain, and varies from one depiction to the next. Depictions most often show Lan as a young person of about sixteen, or a young adult. Lan was more often an old person in earlier depictions, but tends to be a young person in depictions from the past century or two. Legends describe Lan as failing to visibly age over the decades, even before attaining immortality. In connection with this, Lan represents eternal youth and innocence.

Lan Caihe is a wandering musician. These immortal's musical instruments appear in depictions in art and have an important role in stories about Lan Caihe. Lan's musical instrument is the clapper (sometimes translated as castanets), of which there are many types in China. The type used by Lan were sometimes said to be jieban, or else the yunban, which are apparently both types of paiban. Usually clappers are wood or bamboo, but some legends say Lan's were jade. Lan's clappers were three chi long (about 72 centimeters; the length of a chi varies from one time period to the next). Others of the Eight Immortals also carry castanets, including Cao Guojiu, and Zhang Guolao. Because of this, sometimes archaeologists dispute which of these immortals is being represented by a figure identified only by its holding castanets.

Lan Caihe sometimes uses cymbals as well. Sometimes Lan uses a flute, but a flute is more common in depictions of the Immortal Han Xiangzi. Some art of the Eight Immortals show more of them holding instruments, so presence of an instrument is not a certain method to distinguish one immortal from another.

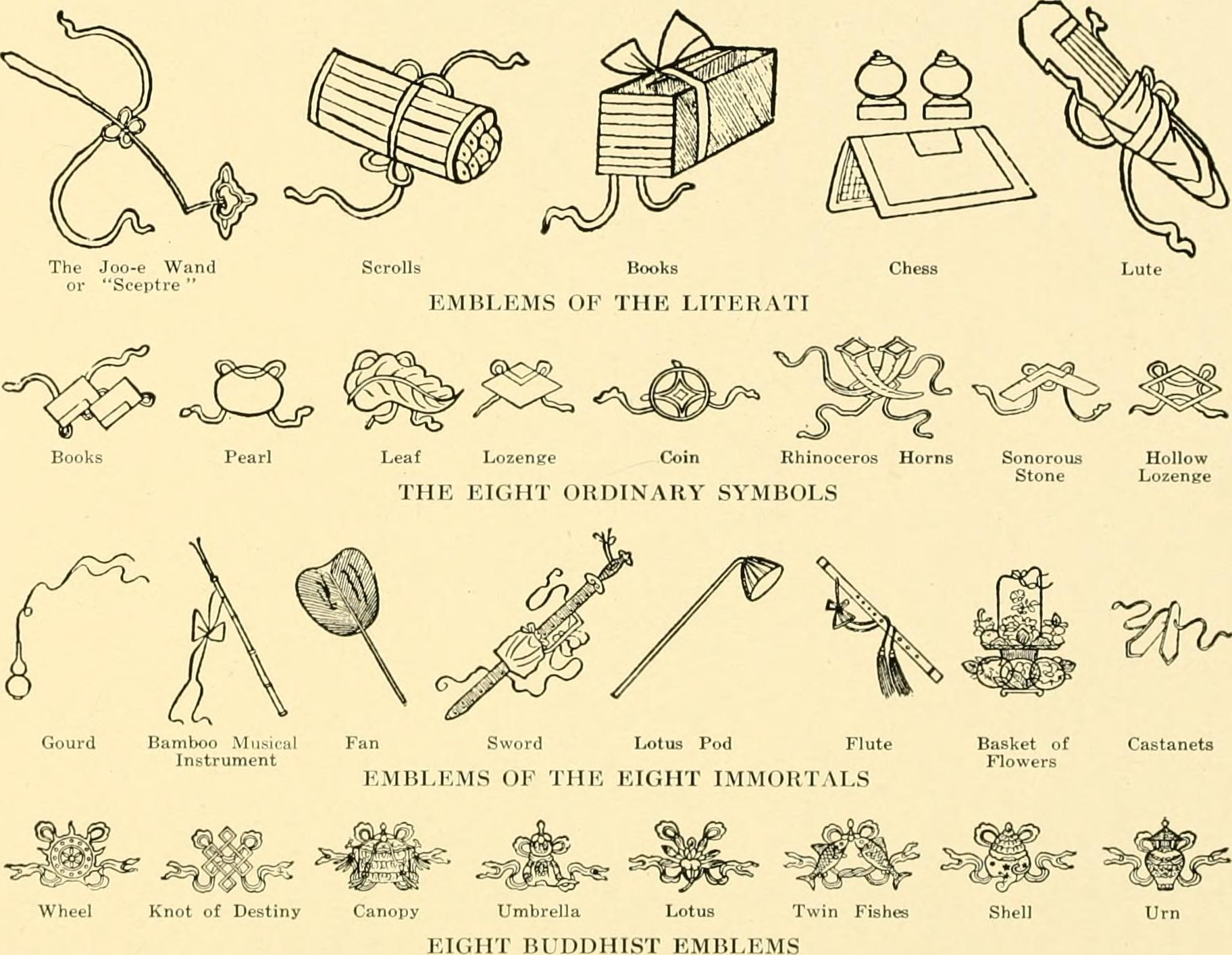
Emblems in Chinese art. The third row shows the emblems of the Eight Immortals, in which Lan Caihe's basket of flowers appears second from the right.

In most art of the Eight Immortals, Lan can be recognized as the one that carries a basket of fruit and/or flowers. Sometimes Lan carries the basket in hand, and other times, slung on a hoe over the shoulder. This basket is Lan's distinctive emblem, and is connected to how Lan is the patron of florists. Lan's basket contains plants and medicinal herbs associated with longevity, including: the magic fungus (lingzhi mushroom, Ganoderma lucidum), which resists decay, and in Traditional Chinese medicine is used to prolong life; sprigs of bamboo and pine, which as evergreen plants, symbolize longevity; flowering and leafless plum, because they show vitality in blooming in early spring from seemingly lifeless branches; chrysanthemums; and heavenly bamboo (Nandina domestica) with red berries. As with the emblems of each of the Eight Immortals, sometimes Lan's basket is depicted by itself. As a motif, Lan's basket is popular in decorations for the Chinese New Year, and represents riches and abundance Lan's flower basket, along with the emblems of the rest of the Eight Immortals, appear in such places as on a Qing dynasty 19th century imperial dragon robe.

Lan's flower basket must be distinguished from the giant lotus flower typically carried by one of the other Eight Immortals, He Xiangu. He Xiangu sometimes carries a giant ladle with its bowl full of flowers, looking similar to a flower basket.

Lan Caihe wears feminine or masculine clothing at different times. Sometimes Lan Caihe wears gender-ambiguous clothing. During Lan Caihe's initial mortal existence as a homeless musician, Lan wore a tattered blue gown or dress. This long blue gown is called lan shan (襕衫), which is traditional attire for men since the Tang dynasty. The gown was fastened with six black wooden buttons, and a waist-belt more than three inches wide. (Some English sources mistranslate this part of the description as a "wooden belt.")

Lan wore a shoe on one foot, the other foot bare. The one bare foot is also associated with the 5th–6th century Buddhist monk, Bodhidharma, for whom it symbolized survival beyond death. (Bodhidharma was seen after his own death, walking along carrying a shoe. Then, when people opened his grave to check if his body was there, they found his grave contained only his other shoe.) It's possible that imagery of these two unrelated figures came to be conflated in art. In Lan's case, the one bare foot may represent freeing the soul, as well as disregard for convention. Having a shoe on only one foot could also have a purpose in the genre of music Lan performed, "stomping songs," which are described further below.

The ragged clothing and one bare foot, carrying castanets and a string of cash, are Lan's appearance as described in the Huan Chu version of the Liexian Zhuan. Some depictions of Lan diverge significantly from anything described above.

== Early life as a mortal ==
Scholars believe that only three members of the Eight Immortals are based on real people who historically existed: Lü Dongbin, Zhongli Quan, and Zhang Guolao. Scholars generally don't believe that Lan Caihe is based on an actual historical person. However, one view is that this immortal may have been based on an actor whose stage name was Lan Caihe, and otherwise went by Xu Jian, during the Five Dynasties period (907–960 CE).

Lan Caihe is said to have lived sometime during the Tang dynasty (618 to 907 CE), like others of the Eight Immortals. Other traditions say Lan lived later, during the Five Dynasties period. The earliest stories about Lan were told as far back as at least the 10th century CE.

Lan's air of mystery extends to time period as well as place of origin. Even the Huan Chu version of the Liexian Zhuan says "Where [Lan Caihe] came from is not known."

During Lan Caihe's career as a mortal, Lan was a homeless wandering musician and street entertainer. Lan entertained people in different towns and villages, visiting no longer than a month. Lan drank in wine shops and restaurants, entertaining the patrons with songs.

Lan's songs were improvised on the spot, while drunk (or believed to be drunk), and performed in a "half-crazy" way. Lan's voice was famously beautiful, but Lan's songs and attire were so strange that people thought this person was mentally ill, so some onlookers said slanderous things. Lan's songs frequently denounced life and its pleasures, warned that life is short, talked about immortality and the immortals, and urged everyone to seek the Tao (the Way). This made the songs "unintelligible to ordinary mortals." Some ballads attributed to Lan survive today.

One of Lan's songs went: "In singer Lan Caihe's eyes, how long can your life last? Good-looking faces are just like the green trees in spring, how could they keep this unchanged forever?" Another of Lan's songs also described physical aging and the brevity of mortal life, as follows:

Ye men of the world!
Now are ye born, and soon ye die.
Yesterday, ye were twice eight,
And your valour puffed from your breast.
Today ye are as seventy years old,
Looking feebly and without strength.
Ye are like flowers of the spring day,
Which blossom in the morning, but fade in the evening.

Another song attributed to Lan Caihe in the T'ai p'ing kuang chi refers to the swift passing of generations:

Lan Caihe for song and dance, for song and dance!
How short our sojourn here below!
The ancients have passed away like running water, never to return;
While the men of to-day are pressing on in ever increasing multitude.

Lan's performed in a traditional Chinese music style called stomping songs (Chinese: 踏歌; pinyin: tàgē; Wade–Giles: t'a-ko). The genre first appeared in the Tang dynasty, and the form practiced by Lan first appeared in the Northern Sung: performed alone, singing and dancing at the same time, using certain types of tunes and patterns, while stomping the foot on the beat of the music, accompanied with a clapper. All classes and parts of the society performed in this style. Lan's habit of wearing only one shoe could have a purpose in stomping one foot while performing.

Although Lan seemed to be performing music to earn a living, whenever anybody gave Lan money, the musician used it only to pay for food and drinks, and otherwise didn't use it for their own benefit. Sometimes Lan strung the money on a cord (Chinese coins having a hole in the middle for stringing), letting it drag on the ground while walking along, or waving it to the time of their song. Lan gave the rest of the money to the poor. Lan was not concerned about losing money, letting coins scatter from the cord, leaving it bare.

While living as a homeless mortal, Lan wore clothing that was generally inappropriate for the weather, without being harmed by it. During the summer, Lan wore a warm undergarment that was quilted or stuffed with cotton and wool. In the winter, Lan slept naked on the snow, so that their hot breath rose like a cloud of steam. The latter resembles paradoxical undressing, a symptom of hypothermia (being exposed to too cold of weather), in which people feel strangely as if they are too hot, and take off all their clothes, when really they are in danger of freezing to death. Paradoxical undressing is sometimes seen in street people who die of exposure. This part of the story may also represent Lan's mastery over the body, similar to feats performed by other Taoist immortals.

Lan roamed all over China for decades. Elderly people noticed that Lan's face hadn't aged since they had seen Lan during their childhoods.

In Taoism, Lan's wandering was seen as a spiritual practice, an "unencumbered lifestyle." This view is expressed in the 20th verse of the Tao Te Ching (The Book of the Way), which says that in contrast with sharp-witted and determined people, a wanderer seems to be confused and drifting, but is directly mothered by the Tao (the Way). In other words, by not intentionally setting out to do things, a wanderer makes it possible for the Way to lead them to where they need to be.

== Attaining immortality ==
Stories vary about how Lan Caihe attained immortality, some of which follow.

In one legend, Lan Caihe became drunk at an inn at Fêng-yang Fu in Anhui. While intoxicated, Lan Caihe threw down to earth their robe, belt, clappers, and their only shoe. Then Lan Caihe rode a cloud up to Heaven.

In a similar legend, Lan was drinking at a tavern in Hao-liang, and heard the music of pipes, and then a crane flew down and landed on the table on the terrace of the restaurant where Lan was eating and drinking. Lan rode the crane up to Heaven, throwing down their sash and only shoe. When onlookers tried to pick up the sash and shoe, the things vanished. In this story, the crane (in some tellings, a swan or stork instead) is a celestial being that represents immortality.

Another legend says that Lan Caihe helped a beggar. Lan gathered medicinal herbs and used them to tend to the beggar's sores. The beggar was revealed to be Li Tieguai, one of the other Eight Immortals, who usually appears as an old beggar who walks with an iron crutch, and who uses his powers to help the oppressed. Li rewarded Lan's kindness by granting Lan immortality.

== Life as an immortal ==
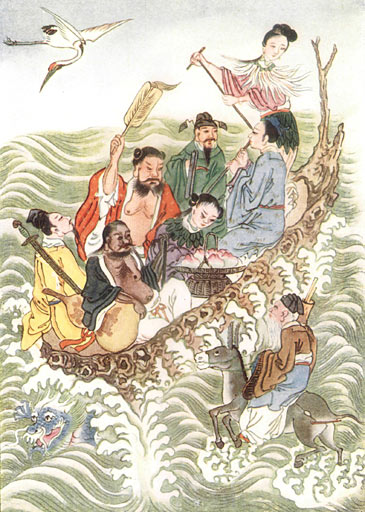
The Eight Immortals crossing the sea in a raft. Lan Caihe is the childlike person in the middle, wearing a collar of leaves, and looking into a basket of fruit or dumplings.

=== In The Eight Immortals Cross the Sea ===
In a story written by an anonymous author during the Ming dynasty (c. 14th–15th centuries), "The Eight Immortals Cross the Sea" (八仙過海; bā xiān guò hǎi), the Eight Immortals chose to all test their talents by riding across an ocean, not upon clouds as they all usually did, but by each placing their personal emblem upon the surface of the sea, and standing upon them to ride across the sea. (This is the origin of the proverb "The Eight Immortals cross the sea, each reveals its divine powers" (八仙過海，各顯神通; bā xiān guò hǎi, gè xiǎn shén tōng). This saying indicates a situation where everybody shows off their skills and expertise to achieve a common goal.) Lan Caihe rode across the sea upon their musical instrument, the jade clappers. During this, the Dragon King of the Eastern Sea spied and envied the clappers. The Dragon King stole the instrument and imprisoned its owner. This started a war between the Eight Immortals and the dragons. Eventually the Eight Immortals rescued Lan and the clappers, and defeated the dragons by pushing a mountain into the sea, which ruined the dragons' undersea palace, and killed many. Guanyin, the Bodhisattva of mercy, showed up to bring peace. As part of the compromise, Guanyin gave the clappers to the dragons, to make up for their fatalities.

=== In The Legend of the Shipwrecked Servant ===
In one scene in "The Legend of the Shipwrecked Servant," the Eight Immortals walked on water to visit a god who lived across the sea. Lan Caihe was the one who noticed that the Immortals' mortal servant couldn't follow them that way, and asked another immortal to build a raft for the servant. Lan doesn't figure importantly in the rest of the story.

== Religious role ==
Lan Caihe doesn't receive attention outside of Lan's presence in the group of the Eight Immortals.

According to the Shih wu yüan hui, quoted in the 19th century compilation Chi shuo ch'üan chén, the Eight Immortals represent dualities of characteristics: old and young, male and female, rich and poor, honored and humble, warriors and scholars, noble and disabled. Of these, says the Shih wu yüan hui, Lan is supposed to represent the young.

Because of carrying a basket of flowers, this immortal is the patron of florists and gardeners. Because of Lan's career as a street musician, Lan is also the patron of minstrels, though being a patron of musicians is usually attributed to a different one of the Eight Immortals, such as Han Xiangzi, the flutist.

== In traditional art and literature ==
=== In poetry by Yuan Yishan ===
Yuan Yishan (Wade–Giles: Yüan I-shan) (1190–1257 CE) was a poet whose hao was Hao Wên. In his collected works and biography, yi shan xian sheng wen ji (Wade–Giles: i-shan hsien-sheng wen chi), Yuan mentions Lan Caihe in some of his poems. In one sad passage, Yuan compares himself unfavorably with two cultural figures:

I tremble at the appearance of white hairs even more than P'an Yo;
People laugh at my blue gown-- like that of Ts'ai-ho.

In the first line, P'an Yo was a poet and official of the 4th century who was famous for his beauty. In the second line, Yuan refers to how Lan Caihe (Wade–Giles: Lan Ts'ai-ho) was sometimes derided in public for wearing a blue gown that was ragged. Yuan uses both figures to express his fear of aging, and feeling ashamed of his clothes as they become worn out as well.

Yuan also wrote this poem on a painting of Lan Caihe, in the Chinese tradition of adding calligraphy to illuminate other artists' illustrations:

Long castanets and loud songs are no sure sign of madness.
You, my children, are equally excited in your pursuit of money.
Whenever, then, you meet the old fellow in the blue gown,
Dance a measure with him in the breeze of spring.

Yuan's poem, above, describes the appearance and behavior of Lan Caihe, and points out that Lan's behavior was no more irrational than that of people who hurry to build mere material wealth.

=== In The Story of Han Xiangzi ===
In the 17th century novel The Story of Han Xiangzi by Yang Erzeng (楊爾曾), the protagonist is one of the other Eight Immortals, Han Xiangzi, the flutist. Lan Caihe has several appearances in this novel. In chapter 20, Lan Caihe materializes an entire remote village, called Three Mountains Village, populated exclusively by eight hundred women. Lan uses this fabricated Village of Beautiful Women to open the mind of Han Tuizhi.

== In popular culture ==
=== Television and movies ===
The Eight Immortals, including Lan Caihe, often appear in television and movies, including the ones listed below. In some of these, Lan Caihe is played by a male actor, and in others, by an actress. This shows that presently Lan Caihe's gender is popularly seen as ambiguous.

- 1976 Mainland version of the opera film Eight Immortals Crossing the Sea (八仙过海). Hao Ruiting plays Lan Caihe.
- 1983 Shaw Brothers Movie Of Ghosts Galore In Role Of Chin Siu-Ho In Transformation Of A Taoist Priest (Lo Lieh) In A Final Scene.
- 1985 Hong Kong version of the ATV TV series Eight Immortals Crossing the Sea (八仙過海). Dion Lam (林迪安) plays Lan Caihe.
- 1985 Hong Kong version of TVB TV series The Yang's Saga (楊家將). Katie Chan Fook-Sang (陳復生) as Lan Caihe
- 1985 Mainland version of the movie The Legend of the Eight Immortals (八仙的传说). Yang Jianzhong (楊健忠) as Lan Caihe
- 1993 Hong Kong version of the movie The Laughing Eight Immortals (笑八仙). Sandra Ng (吴君如) as Lan Caihe
- 1996 Hong Kong version of TVB TV series Journey to the West (西遊記). Mak Ka Lun (麥嘉倫) plays Lan Caihe
- 1998 Singapore version of the TV series Legend of the Eight Immortals (东游记). Deborah Sim as Lan Caihe. In this story, Lan is called the Barefoot Immortal (the Barefoot Immortal is normally a different Taoist immortal from Lan), and achieved immortality with help from Sun Wukong, the monkey king.
- 1998 Hong Kong version of TVB TV series Journey to the West II (西遊記). Mak Ka Lun (麥嘉倫) as Lan Caihe
- 1998 Taiwan TV Series Li Tieguai (李鐵拐). Chien Chia-Ling (簡嘉伶) as Lan Caihe
- 2000 to 2005. In the animated fantasy television show Jackie Chan Adventures, which is loosely inspired by Chinese mythology, Lan Caihe was the Immortal who sealed away a villain, Dai Gui, The Earth Demon, by striking him with a flower. In this story, this immortal was portrayed as a bald older man, wearing black and purple robes.
- 2002 Mainland Chinese TV series The Story of the Laughing Eight Immortals (笑八仙之素女的故事). Huang Bin (黄斌) as Lan Caihe
- 2006 Mainland Chinese TV series Eight Immortals (八仙传奇). Tso Shiao-Hu (左孝虎) plays Lan Caihe
- 2008 Mainland Chinese TV Series Eight Immortals (八仙全传). Nikita Mao (毛林林) plays Lan Caihe
- 2011 Mainland Chinese TV series Lotus Goddess (碧波仙子). Wan Changhao (万昌皓) plays Lan Caihe
- 2014 mainland version of the TV series A Legend of Chinese Immortal (劍俠). Zheng Yecheng (鄭業成) as Lan Caihe
- 2014 Mainland TV series The Eight Fairies (蓬莱八仙). Zhao Xiaosu (赵晓苏) plays Lan Caihe.
- 2016 Mainland TV series Xianban Campus (仙班校园). Gao Jicai (高基才) plays Lan Caihe
- The 2018 mainland TV series Little Bone: Eight Immortals Crossing the Sea (小戏骨：八仙过海). Liu Shijie (劉世傑) as Lan Caihe

== Images ==
The Eight Immortals are a familiar and popular motif in art in China, as well as in Japan and Vietnam. Lan Caihe usually appears together with them, distinguished by the emblem of the flower basket.

=== As an androgynous young person ===
In these pictures, Lan's appearance is neither distinctly masculine nor feminine.

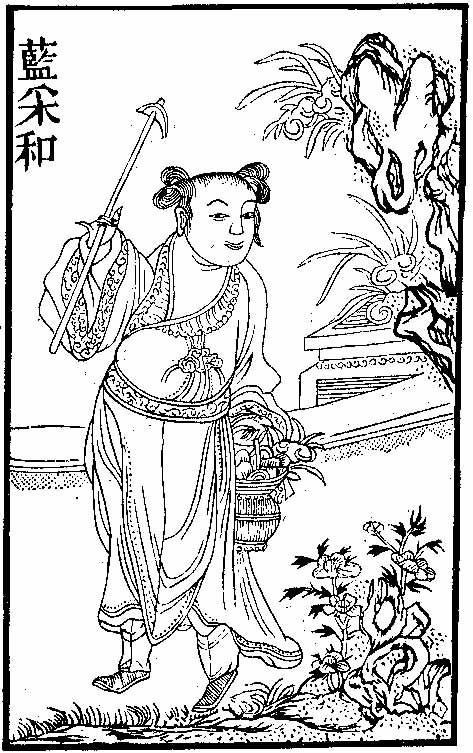
A woodblock print of Lan Caihe, as a young person wearing long robes and carrying a flower basket. Originally printed in the Huan Chu version of the Liexian Zhuan, c. 1206–1368 CE; reproduced 1916 CE.

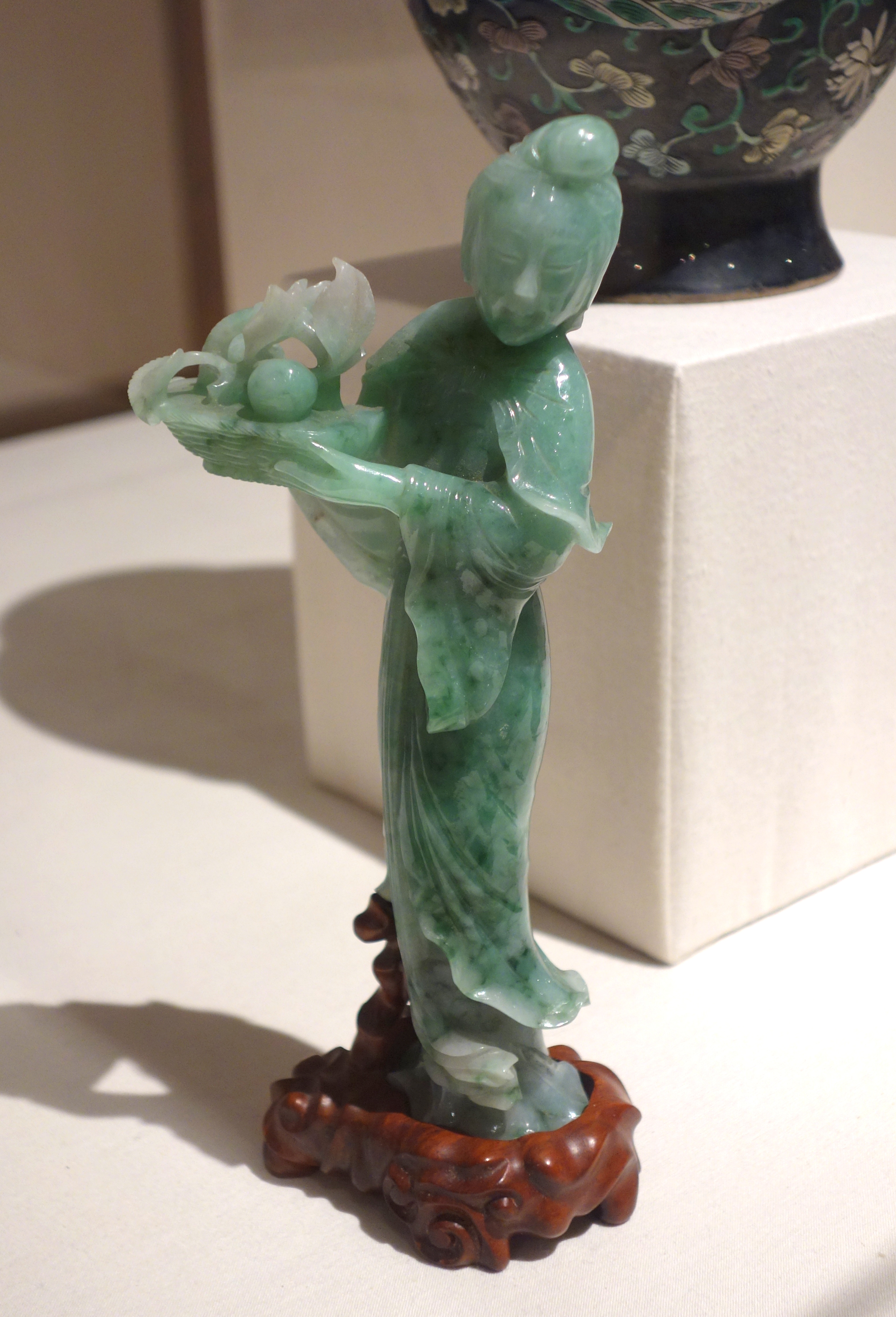
A jadeite figurine of Lan Caihe as a young adult wearing long robes and carrying a basket of fruit. Qing dynasty, Daoguang Period, 1821–1850 CE.

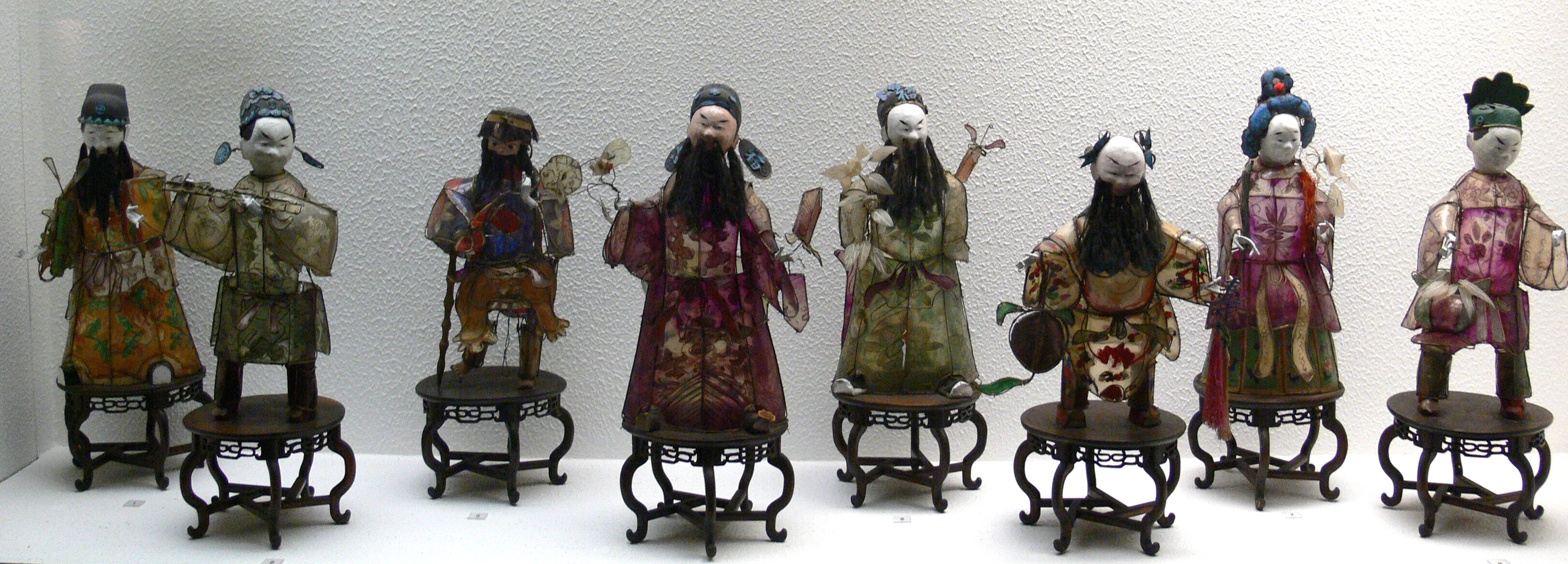
A group of New Year's lamps representing the Eight Immortals. Lan Caihe is on the farthest right, as a young person wearing a pink tunic trousers, and carrying a basket of fruit. Qing Dynasty, 19th century.

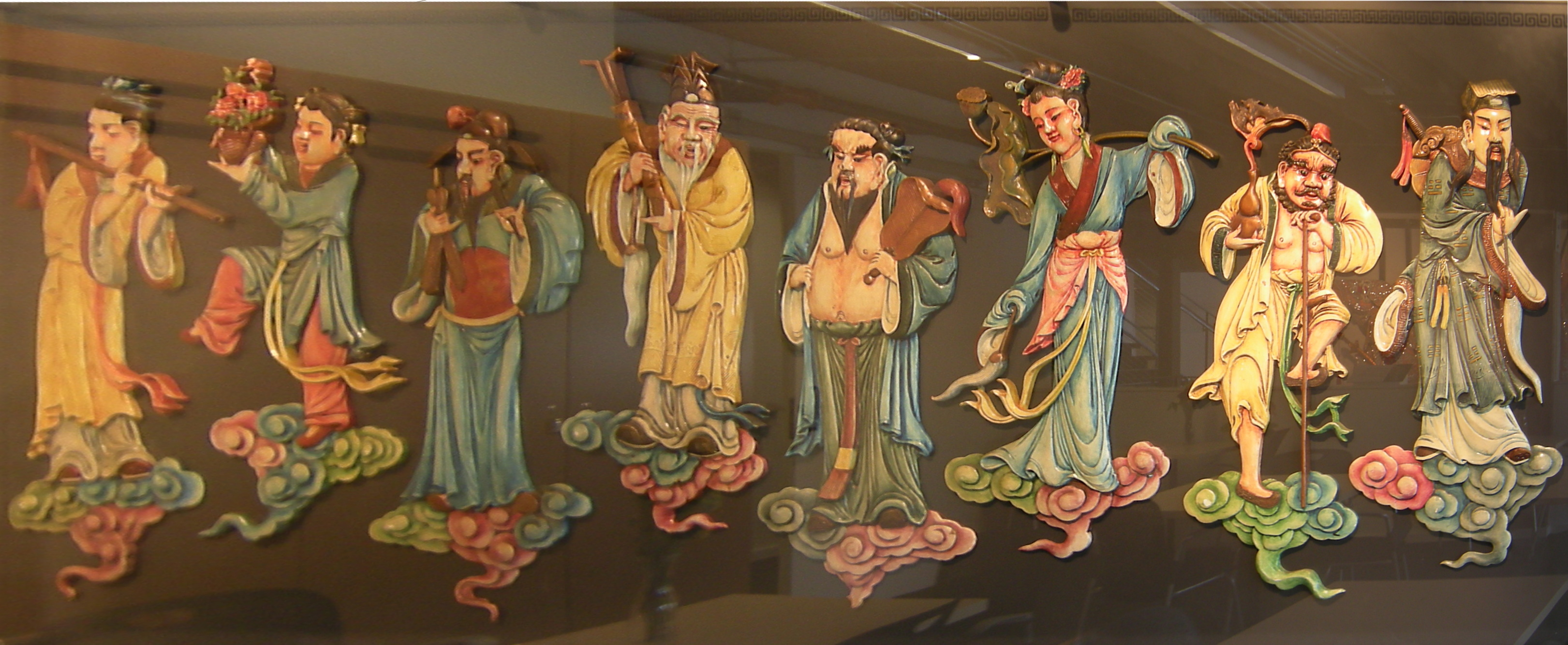
A plaque showing the Eight Immortals. Lan Caihe is second from the left, as a child wearing a blue tunic, pink trousers, white or yellow sash, and carrying a basket of flowers. nd.

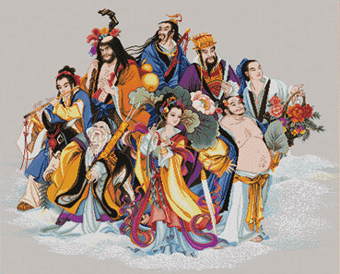
An illustration of the Eight Immortals. Lan Caihe is on the far right, as a young person in pale clothing, holding a flower basket. nd.

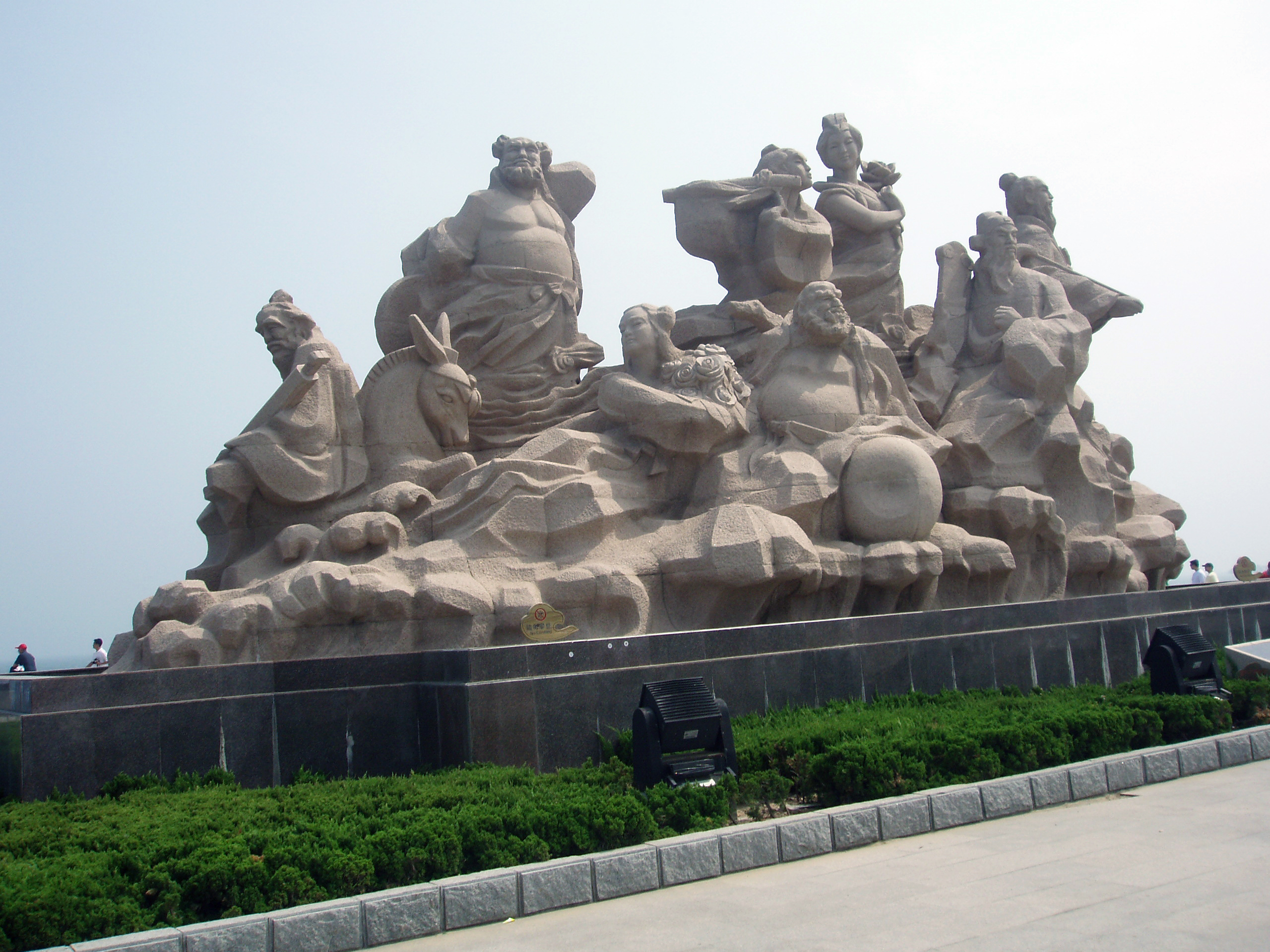
The statue of eight Immortals of Chinese myth in Penglai, Shandong. Lan Caihe is in the middle, holding a large bouquet of roses. nd.

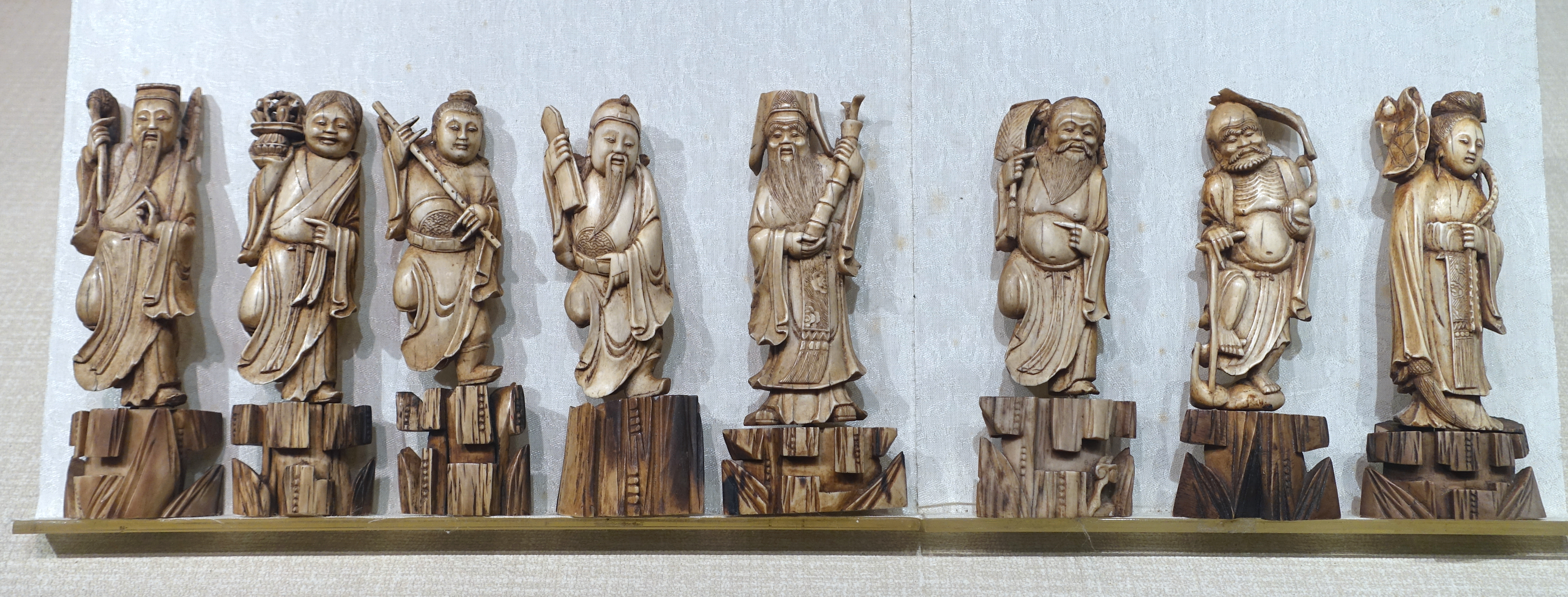
A set of figurines of the Eight Immortals, in the Sichuan University Museum. Lan Caihe is second from the left, holding up a basket of flowers. nd.

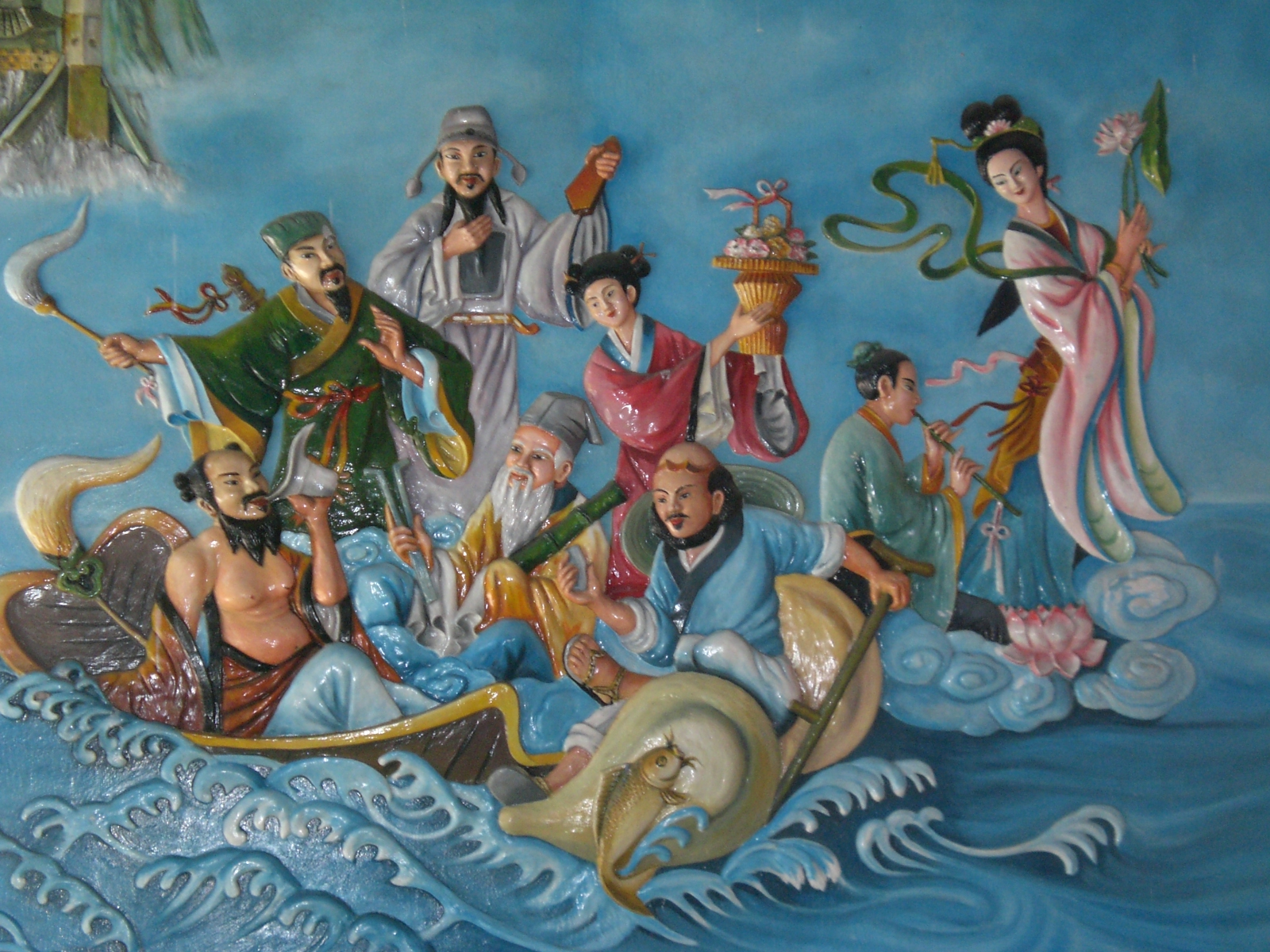
A relief of the Eight Immortals at a temple in Hue, Vietnam. Lan Caihe is in the middle, as a young person wearing pink robes, holding up a basket of flowers. nd.

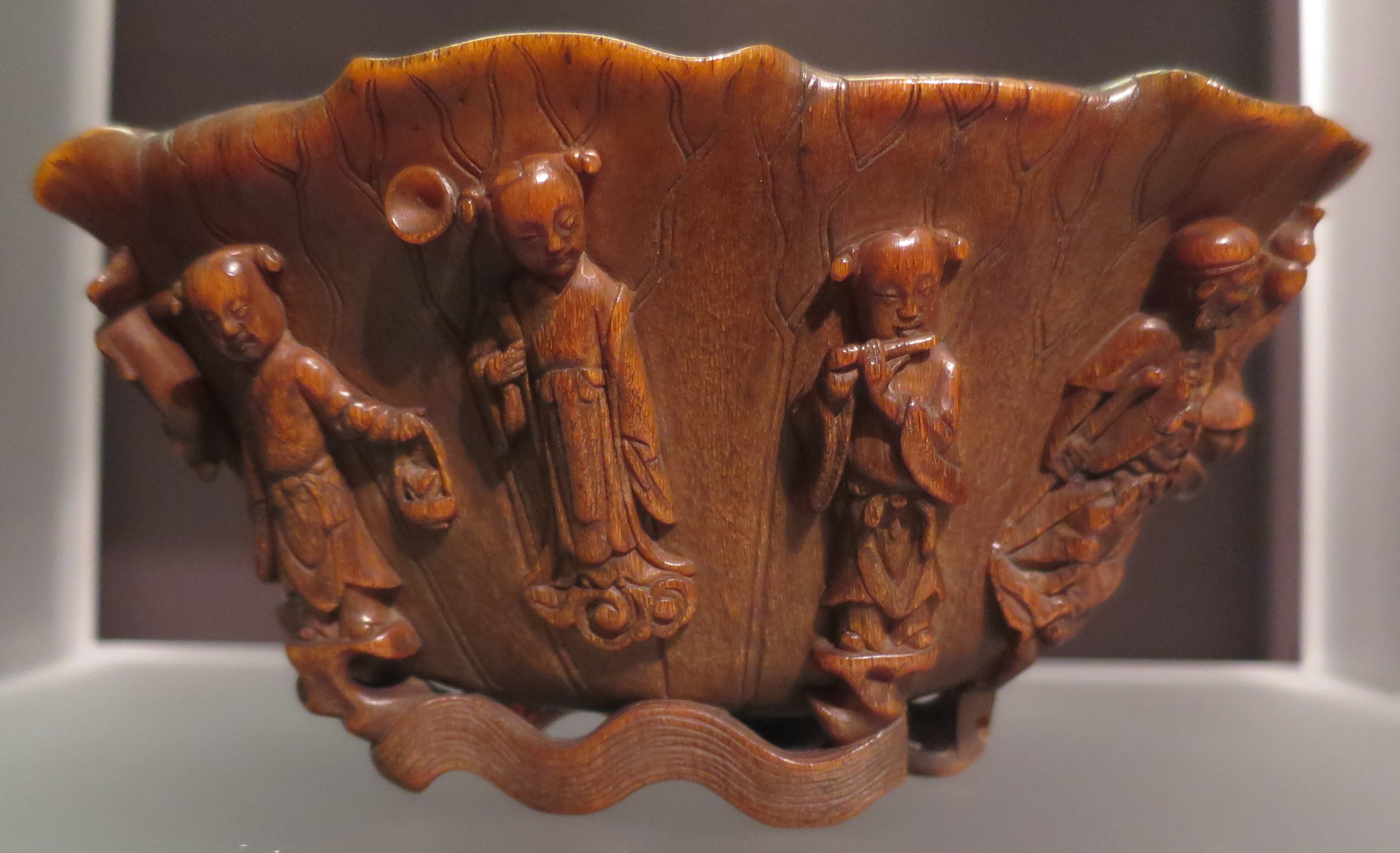
A rhinoceros horn cup showing the Eight Immortals, Qing dynasty, late 18th-19th century, Metropolitan Museum of Art. Lan Caihe is on the left, holding a basket of flowers.

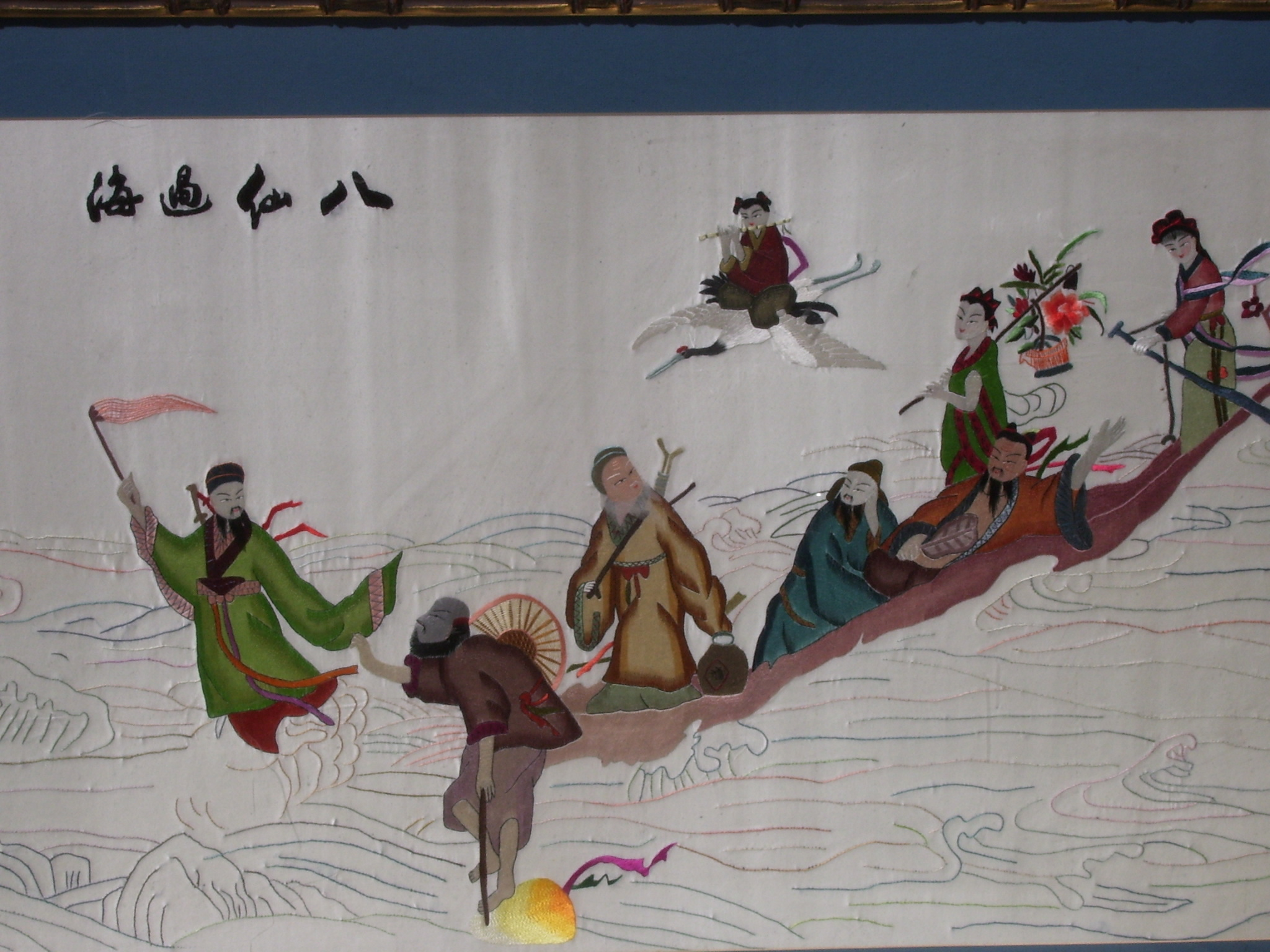
A needlepoint of the Eight Immortals crossing the sea. Lan Caihe is the standing figure second from the right, carrying a flower basket slung on a hoe.

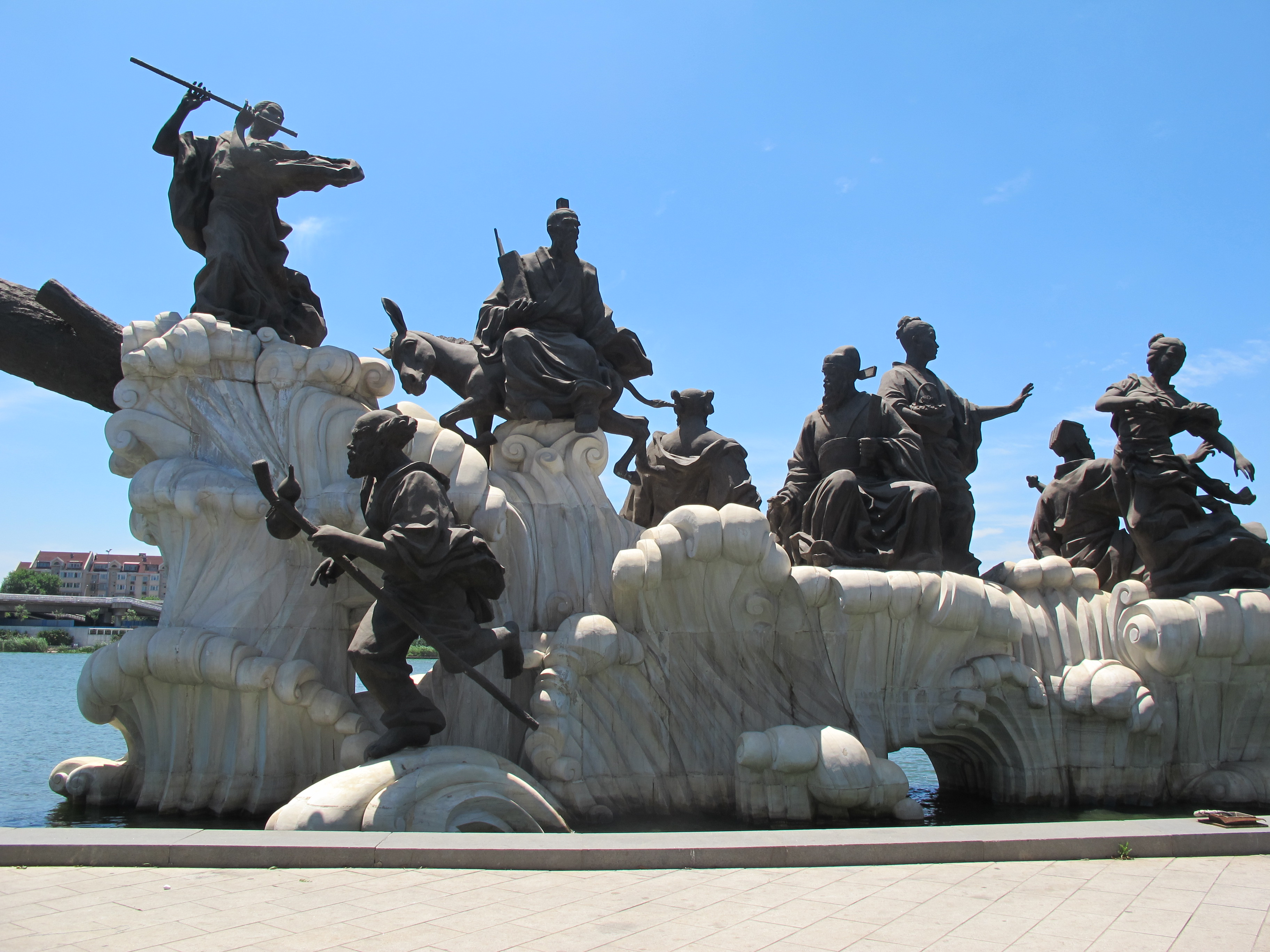
Statue of the Eight Immortals crossing the sea, in Tianjin, China. Lan Caihe is third from the right, holding a flower basket. 2008.

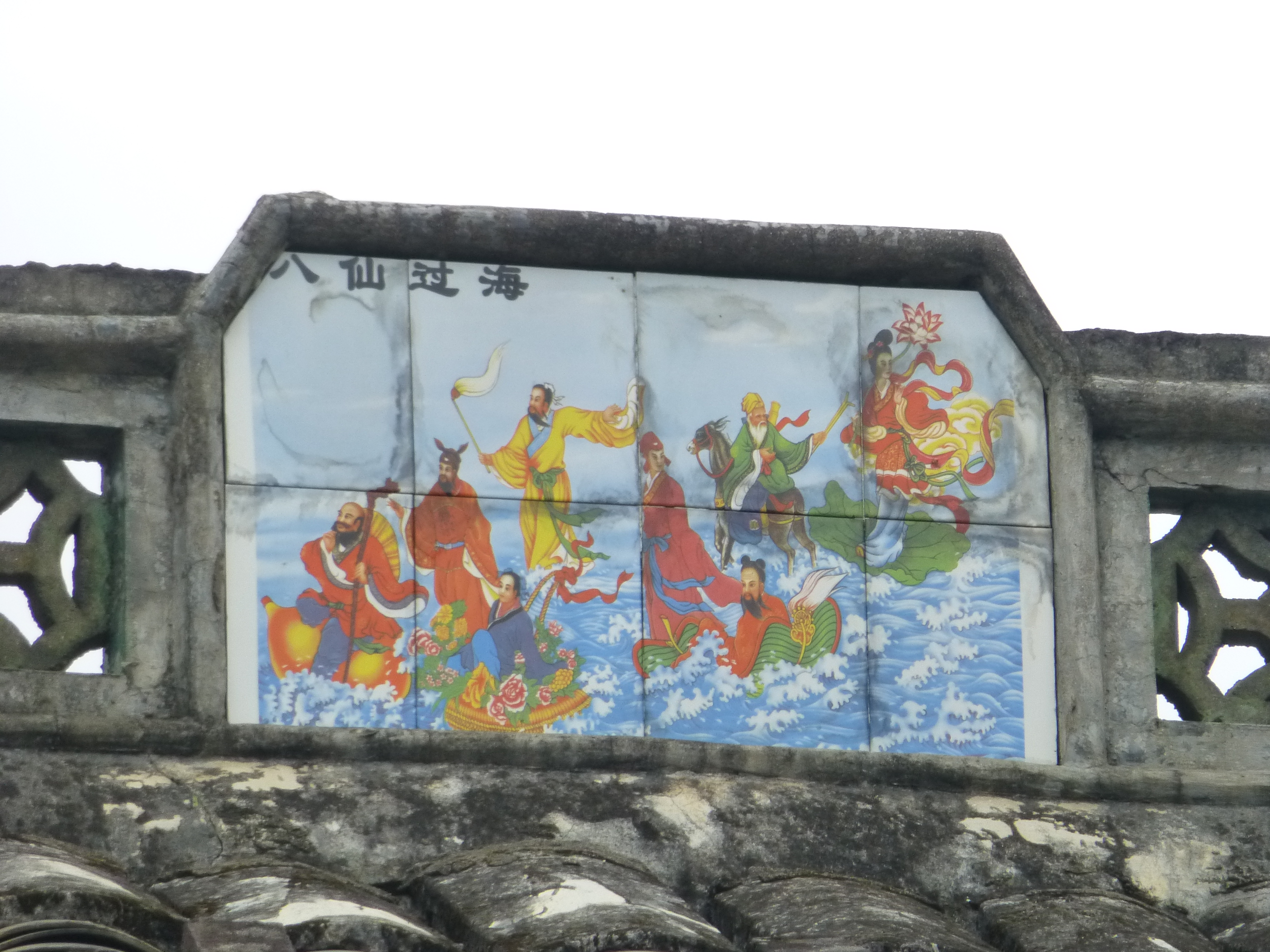
A plaque of the Eight Immortals crossing the sea, decorating a house in Zhejiang, China. Lan Caihe is third from the left, riding a giant flower basket, instead of riding clappers as in the story.

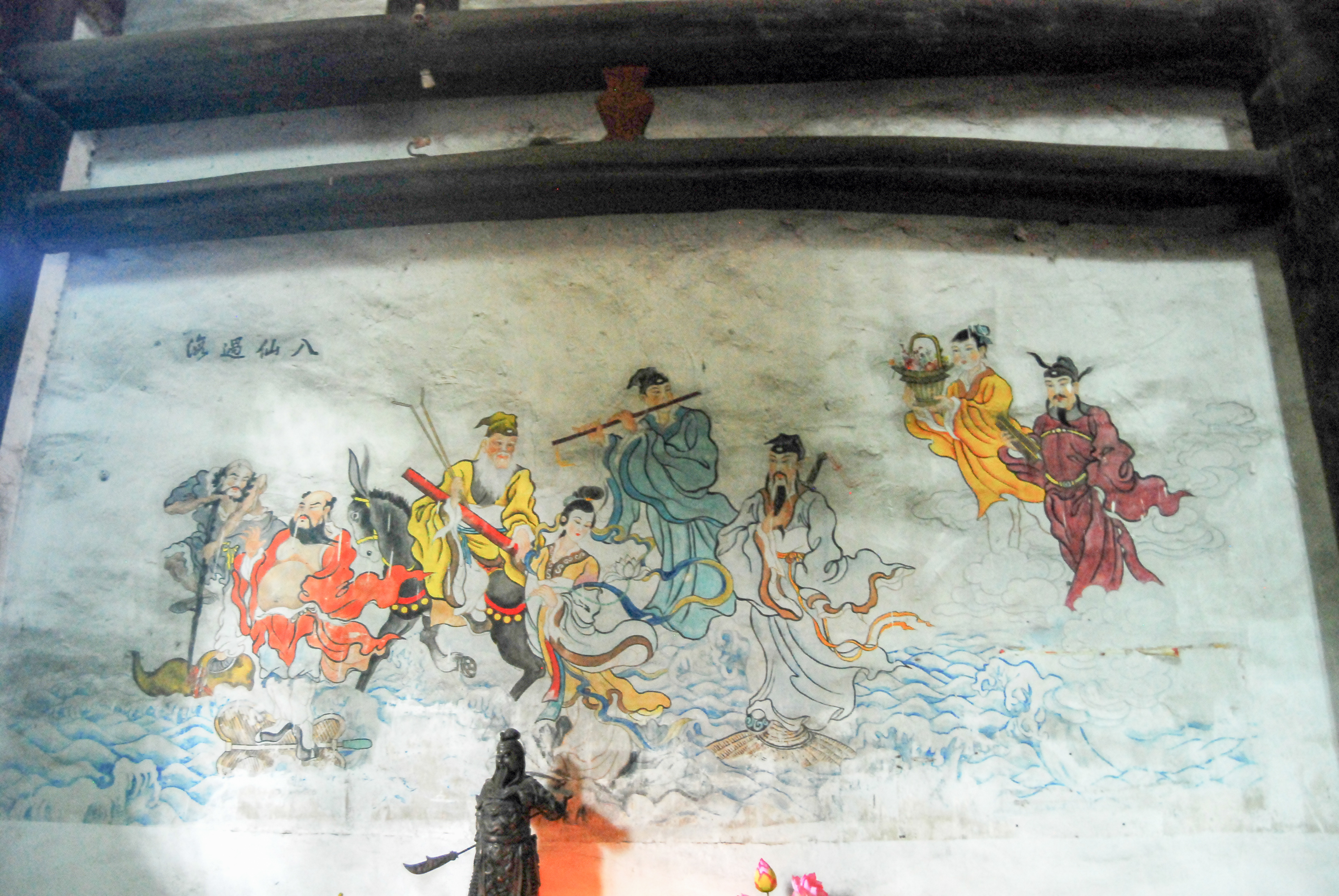
A mural in Sichuan of the Eight Immortals crossing the sea. Lan Caihe is second from the right, in gold, holding a flower basket.

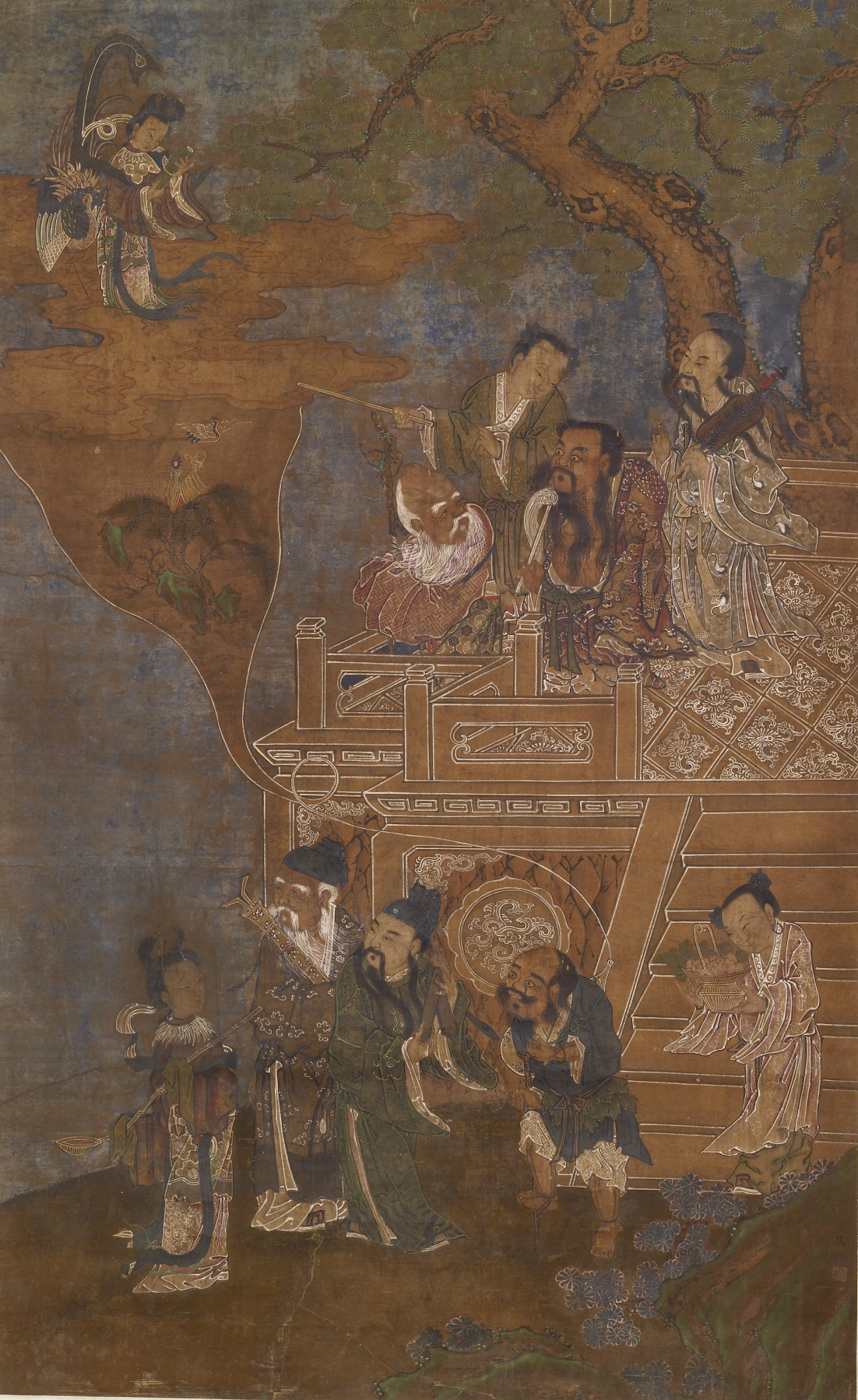
A painting of the Eight Immortals. There are ten figures in this painting. Lan Caihe is the middle figure in the bottom register with a clapper in his hands.

=== As a man ===
Some pictures showing masculine characteristics.

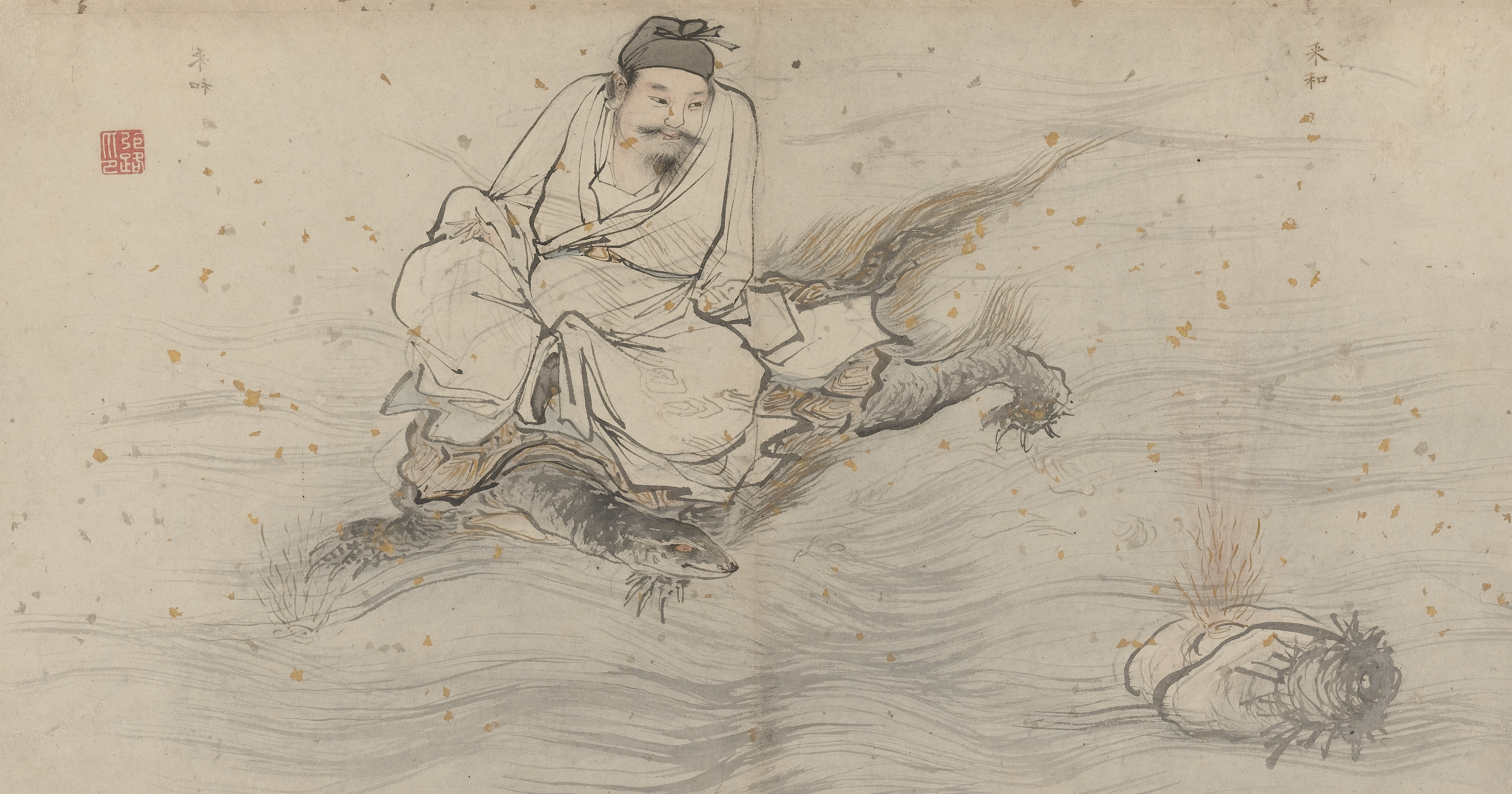
Zhang Lu's painting of Lan Caihe, as a bearded man riding a turtle, a symbol of longevity. Many Taoist immortals are shown riding turtles. Early 16th century.

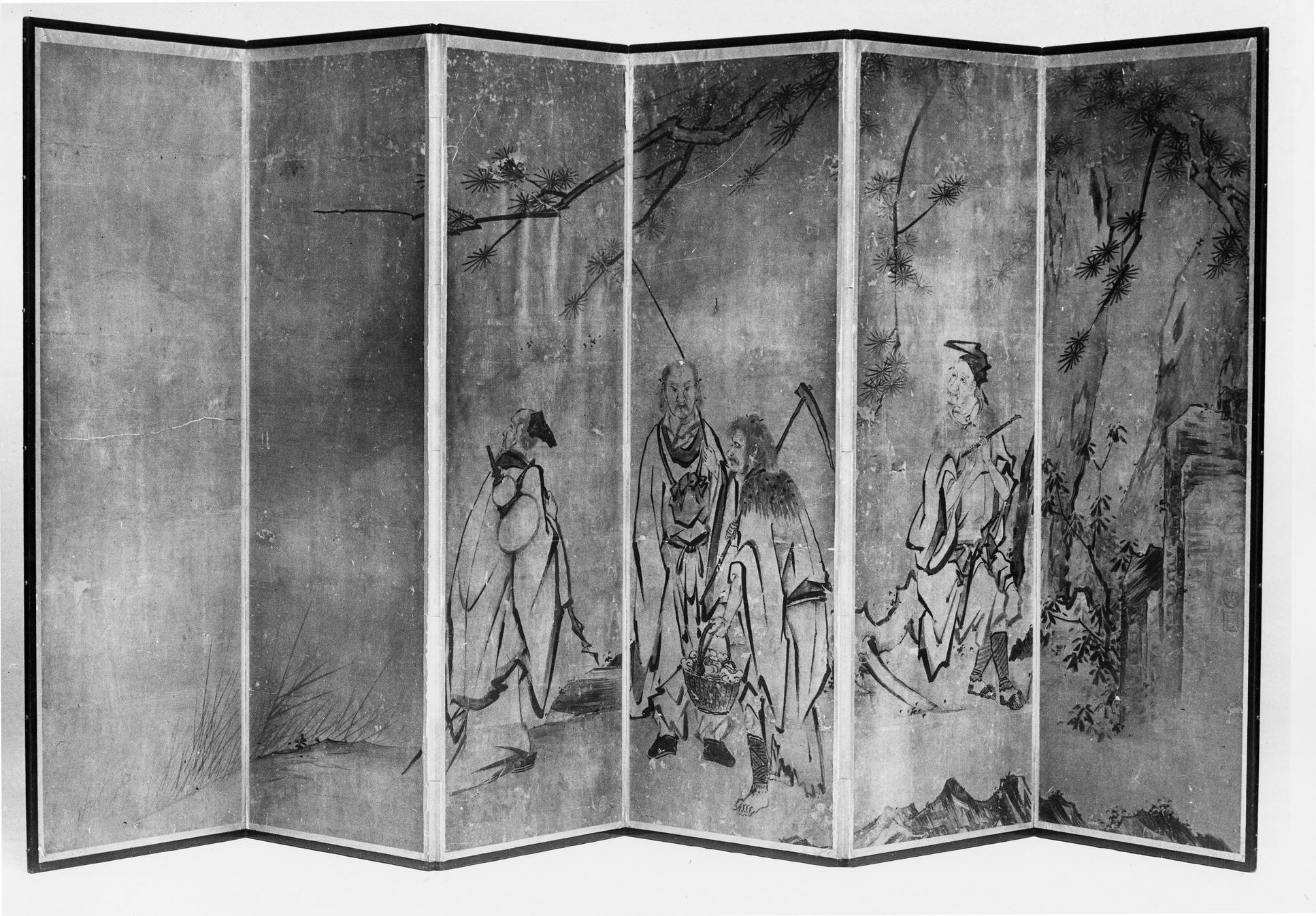
A screen painted by Hasegawa Tōchō, in the Metropolitan Museum of Art, showing a few of the Eight Immortals. Lan is second from the right, with a mustache and disheveled hair. Lan wears tattered robes, and carries a flower basket in one hand, and a hoe in the other. 17th century.

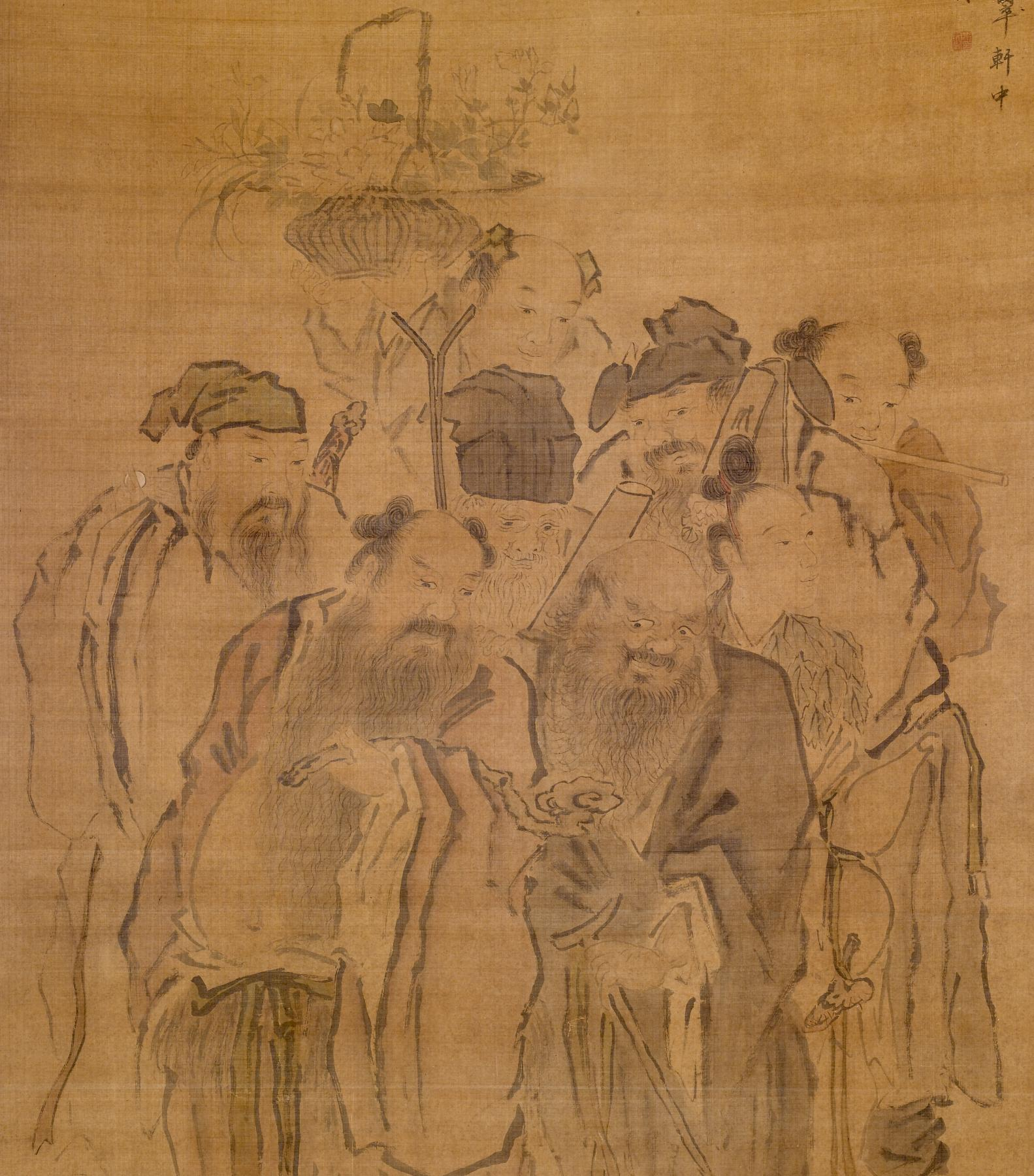
A painting by Zhu Wenxin, of the Eight Immortals. Lan Caihe is at the top, as a smiling, balding man holding up a flower basket. 1813 CE.

== See also ==
- Barefoot Immortal, another Taoist immortal whose depictions can be similar
- Guanyin, a Buddhist figure whose depictions in China often have an ambiguous gender
- LGBT themes in Chinese mythology
- LGBT themes in mythology
- Transgender people and religion
- Intersex people and religion
- Spirituality and homelessness
- Street Transvestite Action Revolutionaries, a charitable organization based on mutual aid for homeless gender nonconforming people
