= Barefoot Immortal =

Taoist deity

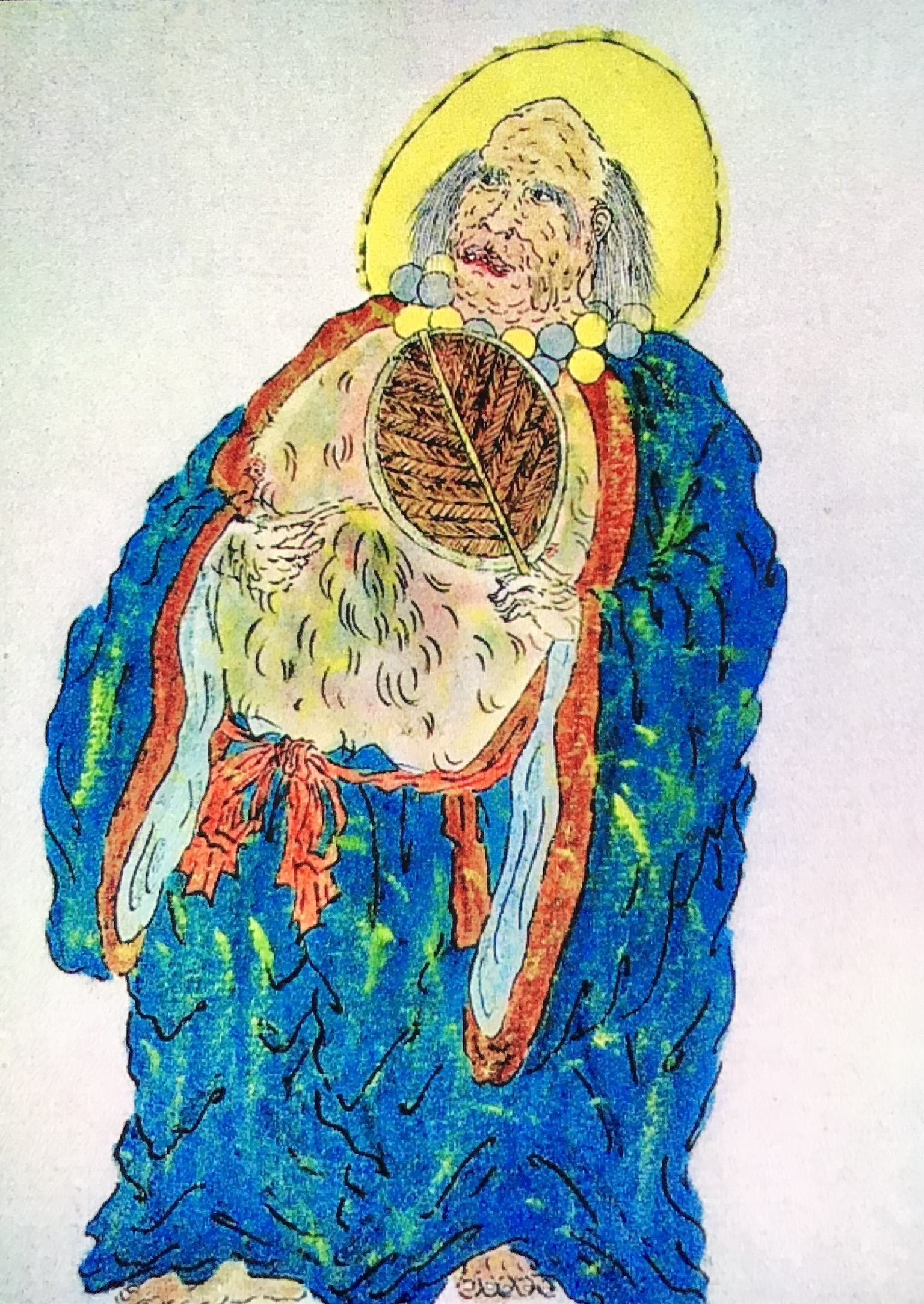
- Painting of Barefoot Immortal
- Other names: Liu Hai, Liu Cao, Liu Tao
- Gender: Male
- Region: China

Barefoot Immortal (Chinese: 赤腳大仙), also known as Barefoot Master, is a Taoist deity in Chinese religion. He is known for his numerous appearances in Chinese operas and Chinese ancient literature, such as Journey to the West and Outlaws of the Marsh. The ancient images and ceramic works that people found about the conception of the appearance of Barefoot Immortal demonstrate that in the minds of most people, Barefoot Immortal is a kind god who always has a gracious smile on his face. Never wearing any shoes and having a half bald head are his unique marks and looks. There are several stories and legends about Barefoot Immortal that have become the widely known classical folk oral literature in China. His original name was Liu Hai before he was widely known as Barefoot Immortal and Liu Cao.

== Personalities of Barefoot Immortal ==
=== Barefoot Immortal and Monkey ===
According to the Journey to the West, one of the Four Great Classic literature Novels in China, Barefoot Immortal was shown to be an innocent god in heaven. There is a plot in this book that describes the story of how Monkey tricked Barefoot Immortal and then went to the Peach Banquet by using Barefoot Immortal's identity. One day the Monkey was pretty annoyed by knowing he was not on the invitation list and that no one had informed him of Peach Banquet which is a really important celebration in heaven. With a strong desire to go there, the Monkey soon came up with an idea. He met the Barefoot Immortal on his way to the Green Jade Pool. That is the place where Peach Banquet is held. He told Barefoot Immortal that every guest should go to the Hall of Bright Lights to go through a rehearsal before the banquet, and this is an order from the Jade Emperor. Even though Barefoot Immortal realized that this is not a tradition and he was kind of dubious about this message. But in the end, he still did what Monkey said and changed the destination without asking too many questions. After successfully deceiving the Barefoot Immortal, the Monkey changed himself into the appearance of Barefoot Immortal and headed to the Green Jade Pool Immediately. In the end, he totally ruined the entire banquet and made the Jade Emperor very angry. In this story, Barefoot Immortal was described as a naive god with an innocent heart but easily trusts the words from someone else which indirectly lead to the destruction of the Peach Banquet.

=== Legend in Shaxian ===
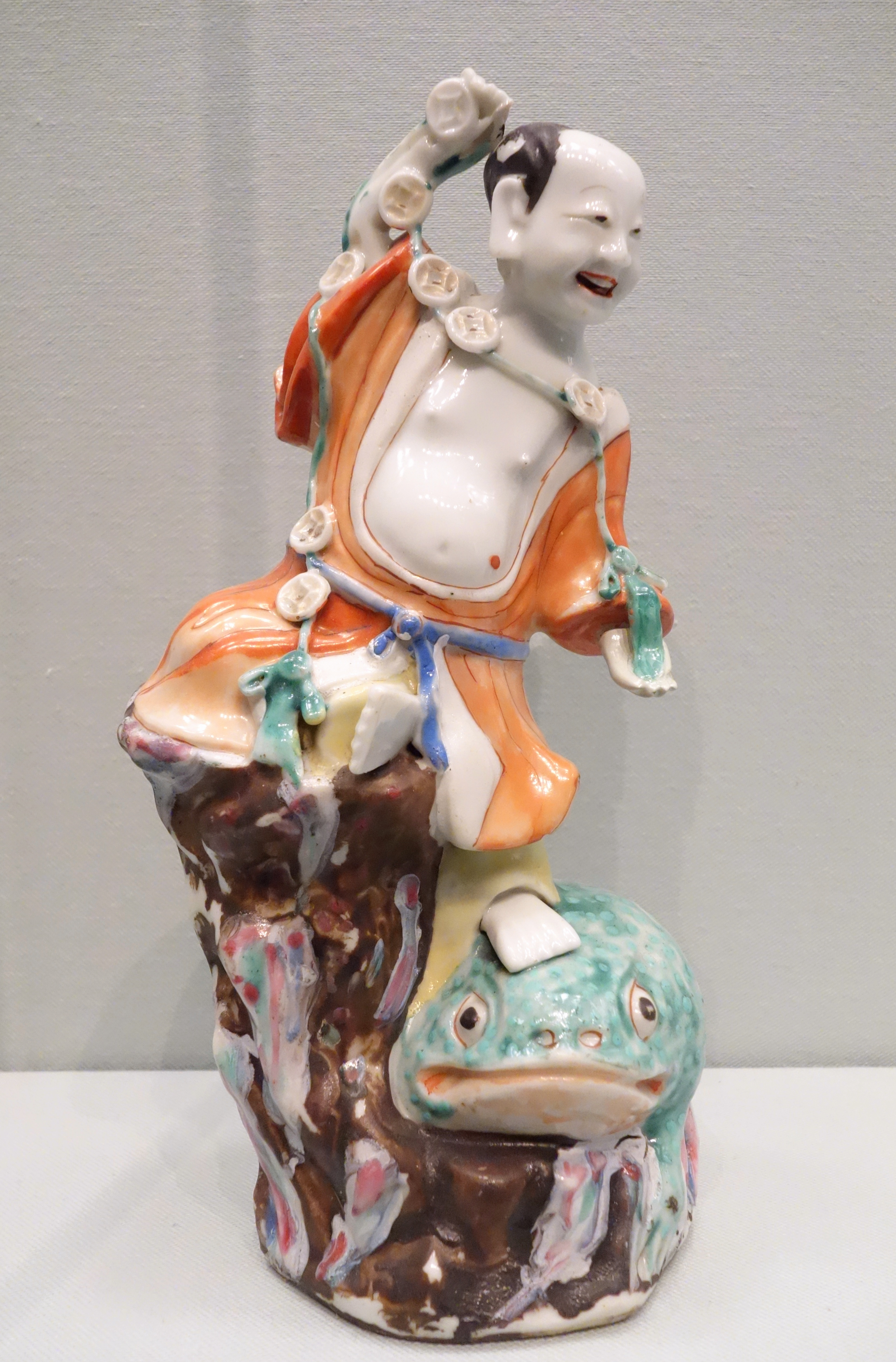
Barefoot Immortal statue in the Asian Art Museum of San Francisco

In Shaxian, Fujian, there is a legend about Barefoot Immortal. After Pangu created the world, one day Barefoot Immortal was on his way to the Green Jade Pool by riding his cloud. Suddenly his foot was knocked against the cliff of a mountain in Shaxian and that made him extremely painful and could not fly stably. The mountain was called Qingyun Feng (青云峰). He thought, even a god like him could get hurt by this strange and annoying cliff, what if it was a normal person passing by? Later, he decided to smooth this mountain up by plowing it with a god cattle that he borrowed from heaven to prevent people passing by from being hurt by its cliff.

However, the Mountain God did not agree with that decision, he was so scared that Barefoot Immortal will really destroy his mountain. Therefore, he came up with an idea to prevent it. He put a special insect on Barefoot Immortal's way that can make him fall asleep very quickly. Mountain God gave him a dream which told Barefoot Immortal that his mother has a serious illness and does not have many days left. If he did not come back to heaven right now, he might lose the chance to see his mother for the last time. Obviously, it is a lie. But after Barefoot Immortal woke up from this nightmare, he was so worried about his mother so he tied the god cattle to a tall pine tree and then came back to heaven. Mountain God successfully prevented Barefoot Immortal from plowing the cliff of his mountain. He asked Lei Gong and Dian Mu a favor to kill god cattle by hitting it with thunder and lightning, while the god cattle was carrying special spells that thunder and lightning they created could not hurt him even a little bit. Subsequently, the Mountain God borrowed a cymbal and a gong from a temple. He hit god cattle on the head with cymbal and gong when he was not looking. After Barefoot Immortal realized he was fooled by Mountain God, he came back to that mountain. However, at that time, the god cattle already killed by the Mountain God and he would never have any chance to plow this mountain anymore. In this legend, Barefoot Immortal showed his care and concern for people and his love for his mother in his character. He is a kind and filial god. He cared about people and he wanted to protect people so the idea of plowing the cliff up appeared to his mind. He also concerned about his mother. But, on the other hand, lack of enough wisdom made him fall into the traps of others and caused the death of god cattle. In the end, the Barefoot Immortal put the cymbal and gong on the top of that mountain with full of anger. After that, the name of that mountain was changed to " Cymbal and Gong Peak" (锣钹顶). As for that god cattle, it turned into a boulder and is still in Shaxian.

== Old folk tales about Barefoot Immortal ==
=== The story of Emperor Renzong ===
The Emperor Renzong was an emperor of the Song dynasty. In Chinese ancient stories, there is a relationship between him and Barefoot Immortal. A linguistic study on the book Outlaws of the Marsh, analyzed the prologue of the original text, which outlines the tale that Emperor Renzong was said to be the Barefoot Immortal. The book that the author of this resource studied on is another one of the Four Great Classical Novels of Chinese literature which enjoys a highly literary achievement in China. Not only this paper mentioned about this tale, there is another Chinese book mentioned the same thing that Barefoot Immortal was said to be the previous life of Renzong. He was ordered by the Jade Emperor to reincarnate into the human world. This indirectly reflects how widely this tale of the Barefoot Immortal spread. Another legend about Renzong presents that when he was a Child, he liked to go barefoot. Moreover, the ancient people at that time said that he has a kind of special ability that made him can see things in heaven. Coupled with his habit of going barefoot, the folk story of he was Barefoot Immortal spread.

=== Legend of Barefoot Immortal and Demon Dragon ===
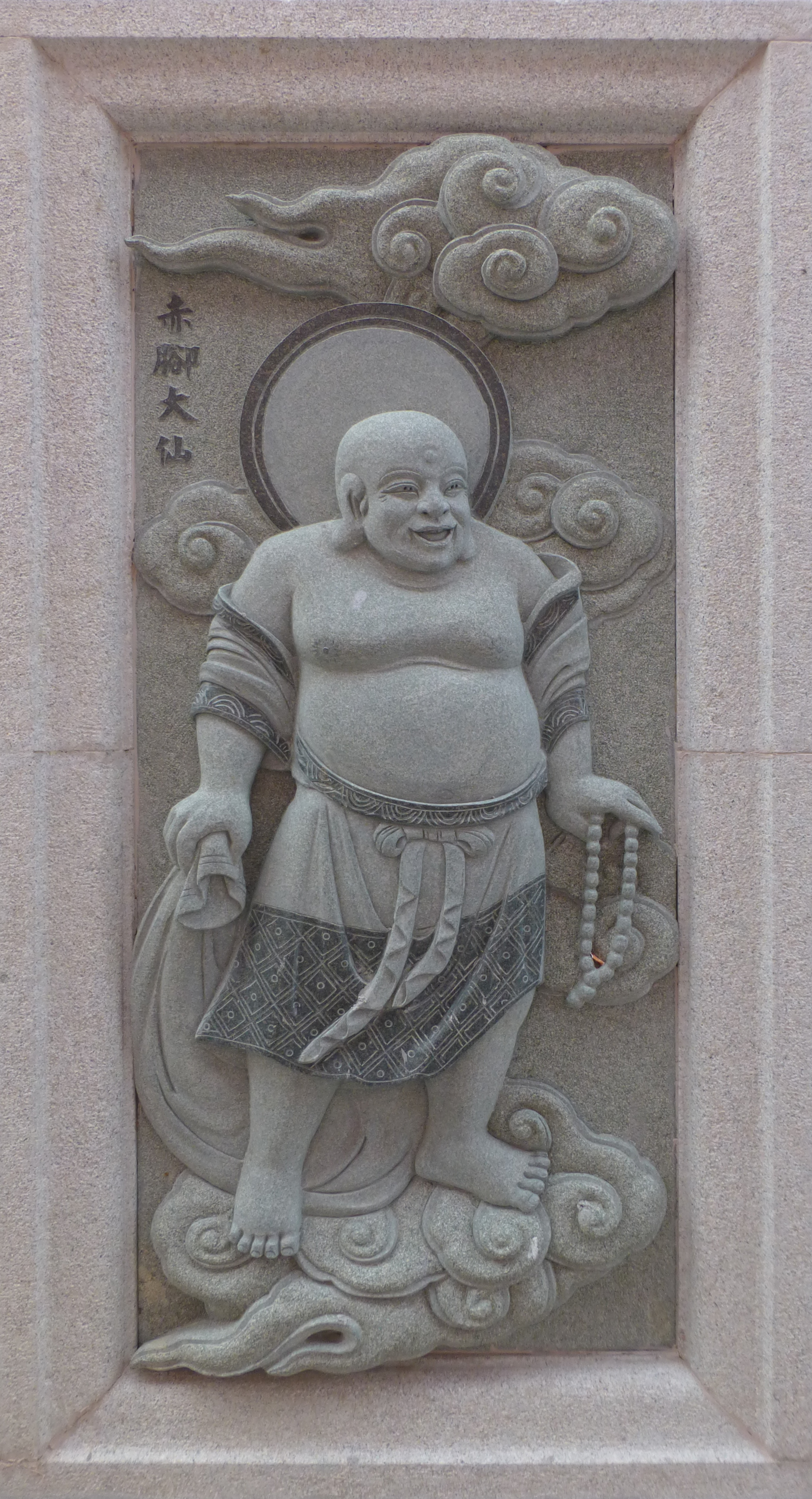
Relief of Barefoot Immortal

In China, there is a district called Sikouzi (寺口子). According to the legend, in ancient times, it was a beautiful place with a pleasant landscape before a Demon Dragon came and invaded here. After the Demon Dragon took this place, he was quite reckless and has bullied all living creatures that made people who were living there feeling like in the hell. He destroyed the wonderful scenery of that place and caused many people became homeless. However, he is not the only one who loved this precise place. Barefoot Immortal was also attracted by the beautiful scenery of Si Kouzi so he went there a few times a year with his god friends in the ancient times. One day, he invited other gods including the Eight Immortals and Seven Celestial Princesses to go there and enjoy the pleasant scenery just as usual. But when they got to there, they were so shocked by the terrifying and horrible views of that place. He found a mountain in front of him, there was a serious flood on the South side of the mountain. On the north side of the mountain, the pleasant scenery turned into a bare field with no grass and no plants.

They saw the Demon Dragon hurting this place deeply and getting pleasure by abusing local people. The Demon Dragon asked a group of people that were as thin as skeletons and wearing worn clothes to build a place for him to rest and have entertainment. After witnessing all these evil things that Demon Dragon had done to this place, Barefoot Immortal was extremely livid and decided to punish that Demon Dragon. And then, the Demon Dragon found Barefoot Immortal went straight to him and his eyes fixed on him with full of angry expression. He was so scared and he could even felt Barefoot Immortal's strong aggressiveness, so he ran away as fast as he could. All other gods that came with Barefoot Immortal were trying to surround the Demon Dragon like a circle. In order not to be caught by Barefoot Immortal, he used a kind of spell that allowed him to hide into the mountain. But Barefoot Immortal just kicked the mountain so hard with his right leg and kicked out a big fissure in the mountain. The fissure was so wide like a canyon. People after this fight have named this canyon as "Yi Xiantian" (一线天). The Demon Dragon was exposed so he hid into the mountain again but Barefoot Immortal is brave and smart, he used his left leg to kick the mountain and made the Demon Dragon had nowhere to hide. Finally, the Demon Dragon was caught by him and his head was chopped off by Lü Dongbin which is one of the Eight Immortals. In this legend, the head of the Demon Dragon turned into stones with hideous appearances. Future generations called these stones "Pan Long Stones" (盘龙石). Barefoot Immortal and the gods he invited to Si Kouzi have saved many living creatures' lives and brought a peaceful life back to this place. Moreover, the canyon that Barefoot Immortal kicked out had connected the two sides of the mountain which successfully let the flood flow into the arid bare field of another side of the mountain. Until now, the footprints that Barefoot Immortal left from kicking mountain remain there in Si Kouzi. .

== Barefoot Immortal and Taoism ==
Barefoot Immortal, also known as Liu Cao, is a god with a strong desire for learning Taoism, a major indigenous religion of China. One day he was inspired by an instruction from a Taoist visitor. Then he decided to study Taoism with that Taoist visitor. He showed his highest respect to Taoism and begged the visitor to accept him as his student. But visitor refused him and told Liu Cao that Lü Dongbin is the Taoist teacher that he should look for. He listened to visitor's words, so he found Lu Dongbin and became his student. Lu Dongbin taught Liu Cao the techniques of meditation, internal of alchemy and sexual yoga. Moreover, he met another Taoist called Chen Xiyi, being taught techniques of Qigong and spirit travel. He was described as the only person that received the knowledge from both Lu Dongbin and Chen Xiyi in this legend. He combined the information and knowledge from two teachers perfectly. Finally, he was not only just learned and received Taoism from his teachers but also spread this precise treasure of Chinese culture and history to others such as Zhang Boduan. Instructing his students to the core idea of the Taoism. He made this culture more well-known and stronger. Especially in the Song dynasty, Southern Complete Reality Taoism was at its most prosperous period because it has five great teachers. Liu Cao and his student Zhang Boduan were two of them.
