= He Xiangu =

One of the Eight Taoist Immortals

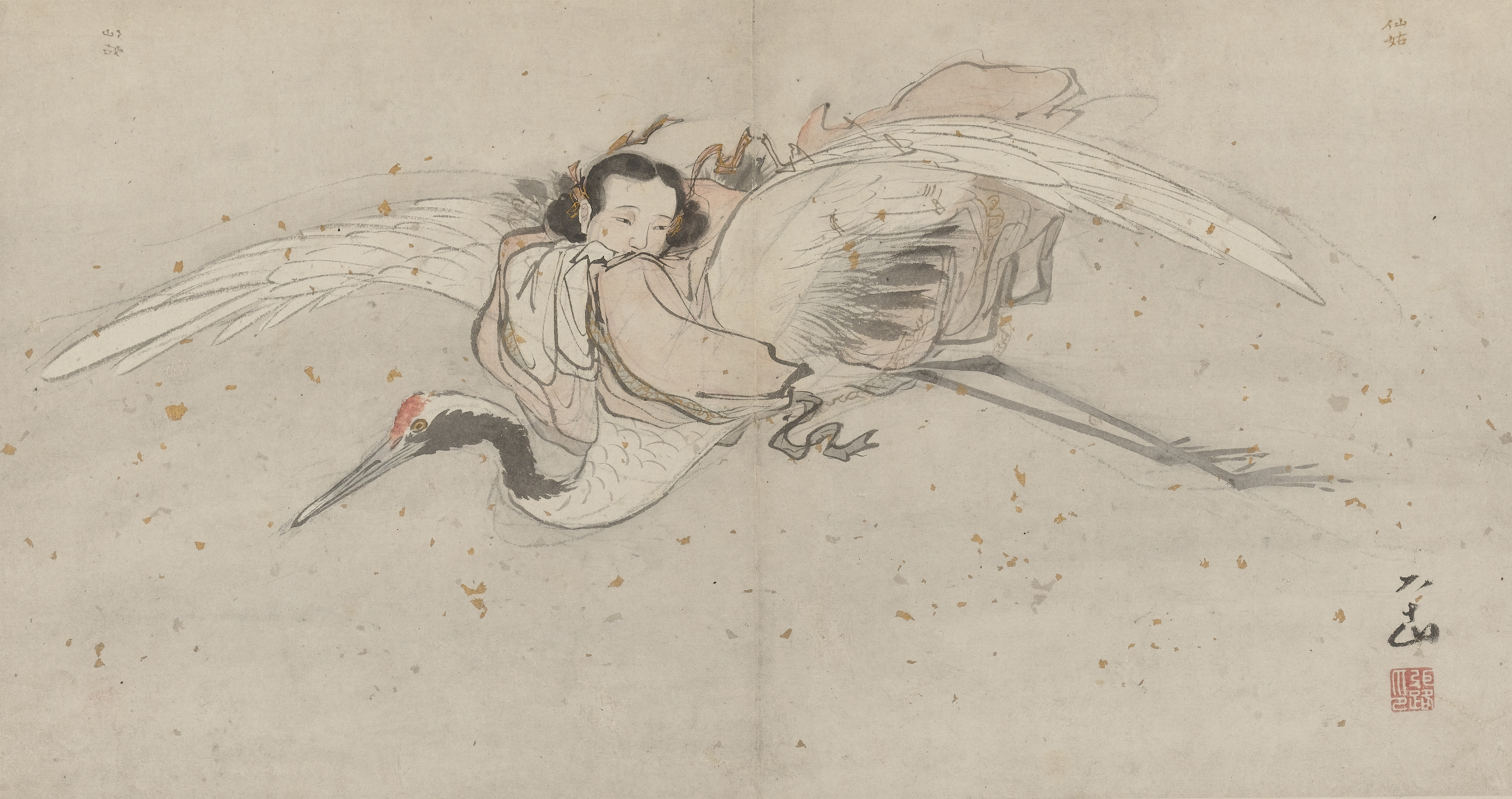
- The Daoist Immortal He Xiangu by Zhang Lu, early 16th century
- Chinese: 何仙姑
Transcriptions
Standard Mandarin
- Hanyu Pinyin: Hé Xiāngū
- Wade–Giles: Ho Hsien-ku
Yue: Cantonese
- Yale Romanization: Hòh Sīn Gū
- Jyutping: Ho4 Sin1 Gu1

He Qiong
- Traditional Chinese: 何瓊
- Simplified Chinese: 何琼
Transcriptions
Standard Mandarin
- Hanyu Pinyin: Hé Qióng
- Wade–Giles: Ho Ch'iung
Yue: Cantonese
- Yale Romanization: Hòh Kìhng
- Jyutping: Ho4 King4

He Xiangu, birth name He Qiong, is a Chinese mythological figure and one of the Eight Immortals in the Taoist pantheon. She is often seen as the only female among the Eight Immortals (though the sex of Lan Caihe, another of the Eight Immortals, is somewhat ambiguous). He Xiangu is believed to have lived in the Tang dynasty and was born in either Lingling District, Yongzhou, Hunan or Zengcheng District, Guangzhou, Guangdong, and some portrayals have her as the daughter of a shopkeeper.

== Legend ==
According to the Xian Fo Qi Zong (仙佛奇蹤), He Xiangu was the daughter of He Tai (何泰), a man from Zengcheng, Guangdong. At birth, she had six long hairs on the crown of her head. When she was about 14 or 15, a divine personage appeared to her in a dream and instructed her to eat powdered mica so that her body might become etherealised and immune from death. She did as instructed, vowed to remain a virgin, and gradually decreased her food intake.

Wu Zetian once sent a messenger to summon He Xiangu to the imperial court, but she disappeared on the way there.

One day during the Jinglong era (707–710 CE) in the reign of Emperor Zhongzong of the Tang dynasty, she ascended to Heaven in broad daylight and became an immortal.

In the "Duxing Magazine" written by Zeng Minxing during the Song dynasty, it is recorded that when Di Qing was on a campaign to suppress the Nannong rebellion and passed through Yongzhou, he heard that He Xiangu had the ability to foresee good and bad omens. He went to her to request a prediction regarding the success or failure of this expedition. He Xiangu said, "General, when you go there, you won't even see the enemy. Before you reach the enemy, they will have already been defeated and fled". Di Qing didn't initially believe in this fortunate prediction. Later, during the battle between the Song army and Nong Zhigao, after only a few rounds, Nong Zhigao was defeated and fled to the Dali Kingdom.

== Depiction ==
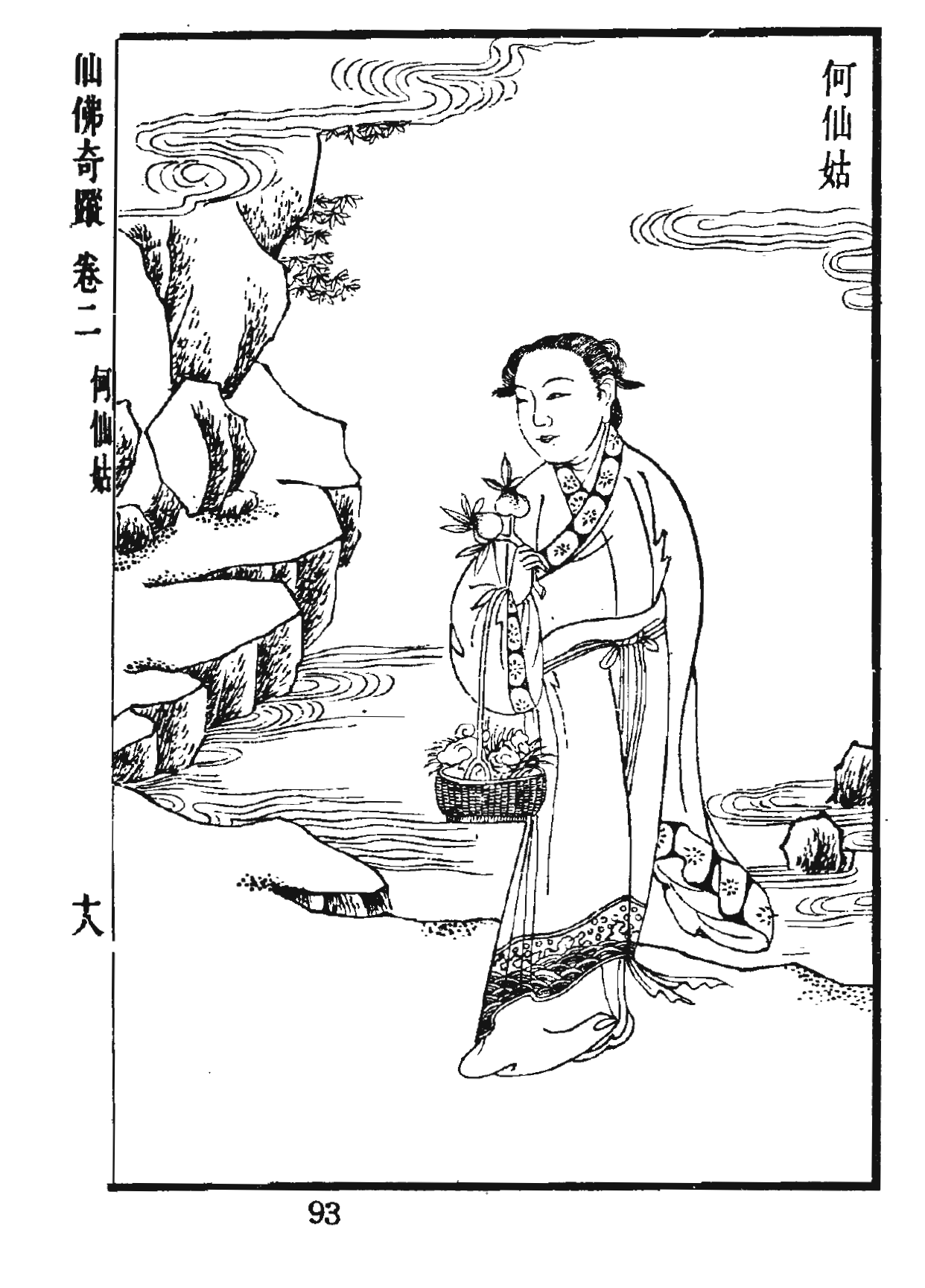
He Xiangu

He Xiangu's lotus flower improves one's health, mental and physical. She is depicted holding a lotus flower, and sometimes with the musical instrument known as sheng, or a fenghuang to accompany her. She may also carry a bamboo ladle or fly-whisk.

== Modern depictions ==
In the television show Jackie Chan Adventures, He Xiangu was shown to be the Immortal who sealed away Tso Lan, The Moon Demon, even though show lore initially indicated that she sealed away Hsi Wu, The Sky Demon.

In the musical theater song cycle album Eight Immortals (A Song Cycle) written by Sam Tsui and Casey Breeves, He Xiangu is depicted as a modern-day social media influencer addicted to crushed Tahitian moonstone supplements in the song #MyMorningRoutine sung by Ashley Chiu.
