= Eight Immortals =

Immortal beings of Chinese mythology

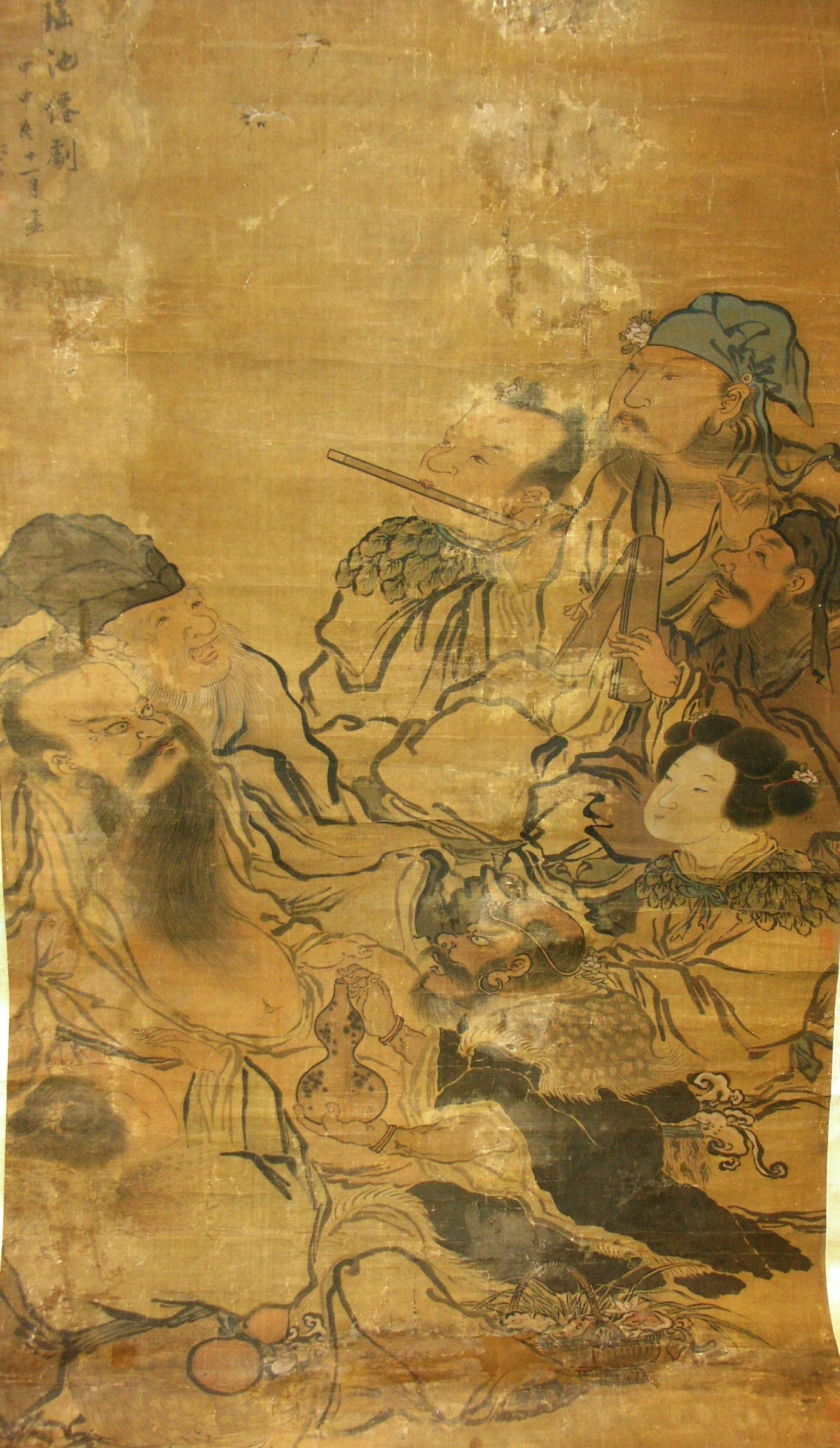
- Gathering of Yaochi (Eight) Immortals (瑤池仙劇圖), by Zhang Chong, Ming dynasty (British Museum)

Chinese name
- Chinese: 八仙
- Literal meaning: eight xian
Transcriptions
Standard Mandarin
- Hanyu Pinyin: bā xiān
- Wade–Giles: Pa^{1}-hsien^{1}
- IPA: [pá.ɕjɛ́n]
Yue: Cantonese
- Jyutping: baat^{3} sin^{1}
Southern Min
- Hokkien POJ: pat-sian
Middle Chinese
- Middle Chinese: /pˠat̚ siᴇn/
Old Chinese
- Zhengzhang: /*preːd sen/

Vietnamese name
- Vietnamese alphabet: Bát Tiên
- Chữ Hán: 八仙 or 八僊

Korean name
- Hangul: 팔선
- Hanja: 八仙
Transcriptions
- McCune–Reischauer: palseon

Japanese name
- Kanji: 八仙 or 八僊
- Hiragana: はっせん
Transcriptions
- Romanization: hassen

The Eight Immortals (Chinese: 八仙) are a group of legendary xian (immortals) in Chinese mythology. Each immortal's power can be transferred to a vessel (法器) that can bestow life or destroy evil. Together, these eight vessels are called the "Covert Eight Immortals" (暗八仙). Most of them are said to have been born in the Tang or Song Dynasty. They are revered by the Taoists and are also a popular element in secular Chinese culture. They are said to live on a group of five islands in the Bohai Sea, which includes Mount Penglai.

The Immortals are:

- He Xiangu (何仙姑), in modern context generally seen as the only female of the group, often depicted holding a lotus flower.
- Cao Guojiu (曹國舅), related to a Song dynasty emperor before he became immortal.
- Li Tieguai (李鐵拐), considered to be mentally disturbed and associated with medicine and easing the suffering of the sick and needy, identified by his iron crutch and calabash bottle.
- Lan Caihe (藍采和), originally pictured as female; later becoming ambiguous, and is considered the patron of florists and gardeners.
- Lü Dongbin (呂洞賓), a scholar and poet considered to be the leader of the Eight Immortals.
- Han Xiangzi (韓湘子), a flute artist.
- Zhang Guolao (張果老), a fangshi symbol of longevity.
- Zhongli Quan (鍾離權), associated with death and the power to create silver and gold, often depicted holding a fan.

In literature before the 1970s, they were sometimes translated as the Eight Genies. Some stories had them all "cheerfully addicted to wine", so they were called the "Jiu-zhong Ba Xian" or "Eight Drunken Immortals". First described in the Yuan Dynasty, they were probably named after the Eight Immortal Scholars of the Han.

== In art ==
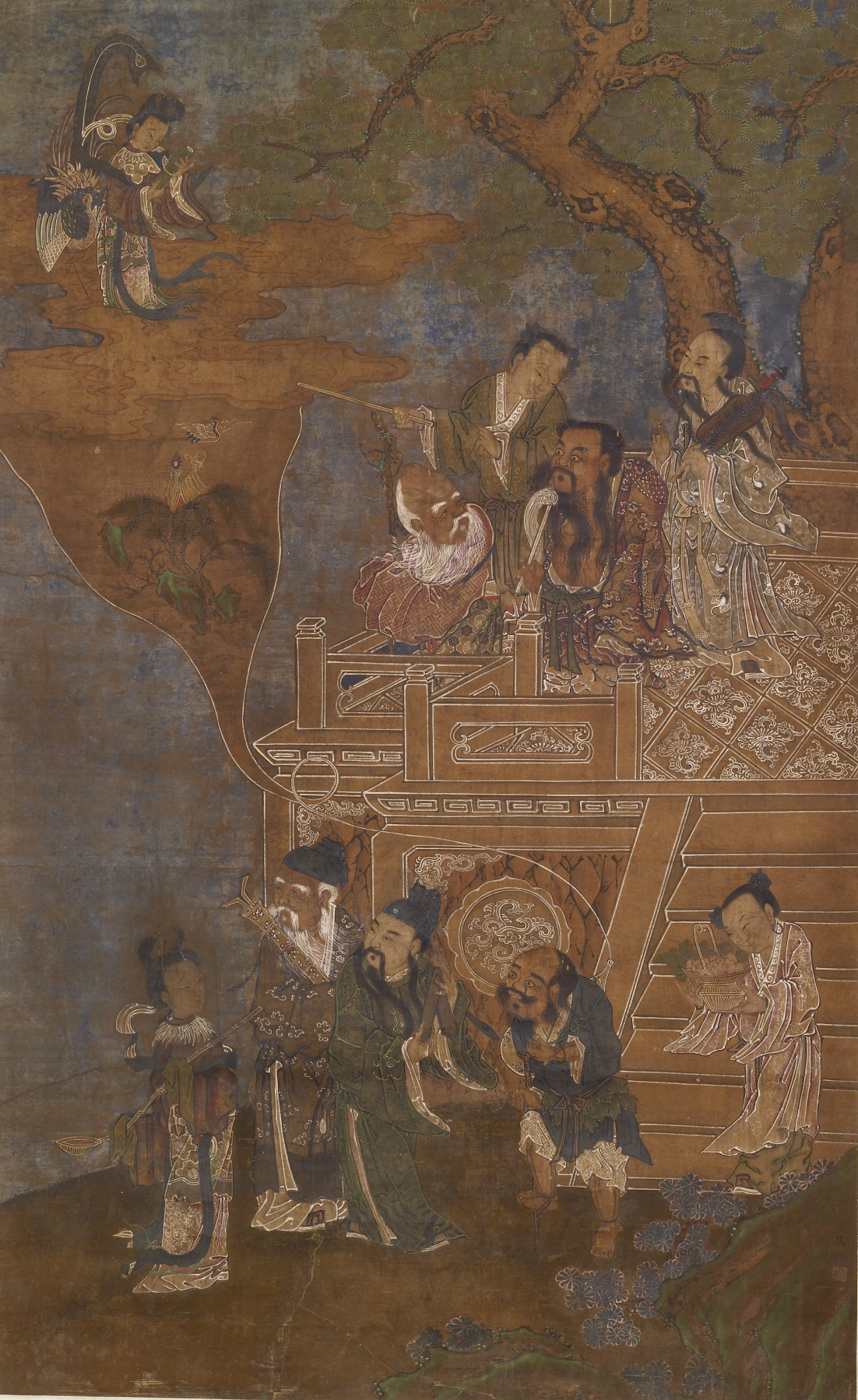
The Eight Immortals (Walters Art Museum)

While cults dedicated to various Taoist immortals date back to the Han dynasty, the popular and well-known Eight Immortals first appeared in the Jin dynasty. The wall murals and sculptures in the Jin tombs, created during the 12th and 13th centuries, depict a group of eight Taoist immortals. The term "Eight Immortals" became commonplace after the popularization of the Taoist group of writers and artists known as the Complete Realization (Quanshen). The most famous art depiction of the Eight Immortals from this period is a mural of them in the Eternal Joy Temple (Yongle Gong) at Ruicheng.

The Eight Immortals are considered to be signs of prosperity and longevity, so they are popular themes in ancient and medieval art. They were frequent adornments on celadon vases. They were also common in sculptures owned by the nobility. Many silk paintings, wall murals, and wood block prints remain of the Eight Immortals. They were often depicted either together in one group, or alone to give more homage to that specific immortal.

An interesting feature of early Eight Immortal artwork is that they are often accompanied by jade hand maidens, which are commonly depicted as servants of the higher ranked deities, and depictions commonly include other images showing their great spiritual power. During the Ming and Qing dynasties, the Eight Immortals were frequently associated with other prominent spiritual deities in artwork. There are numerous paintings with them and the Three Stars (the gods of longevity, prosperity, and good fortune) together. Also, other deities such as the Queen Mother of the West are commonly seen in the company of the Eight Immortals and she is also popularly thought to have blessed them with their supernatural abilities.

Artwork inspired by and about the Eight Immortals is not limited to paintings or other visual arts. They are quite prominent in written works as well. Authors and playwrights have written numerous stories and plays on the Eight Immortals. One famous story that has been rewritten many times and turned into several plays (the most famous written by Mu Zhiyuan in the Yuan Dynasty) is The Yellow-Millet Dream, which is the story of how Lǚ Dòngbīn met Zhongli Quan and began his path to immortality.

== In literature ==
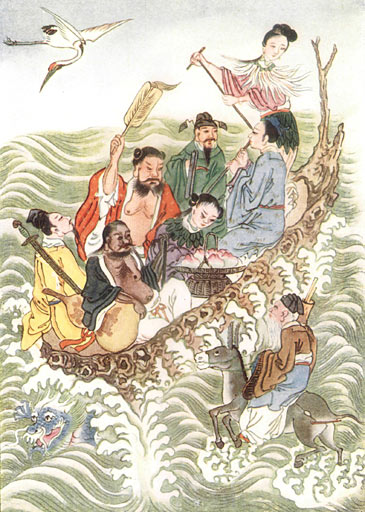
The Eight Immortals crossing the sea, from Myths and Legends of China. Clockwise in the boat starting from the stern: He Xian'gu, Han Xiang Zi, Lan Caihe, Li Tieguai, Lü Dongbin, Zhongli Quan, Cao Guojiu and outside the boat is Zhang Guo Lao.

The Immortals are the subject of many artistic creations, such as paintings and sculptures. Examples of writings about them include:

- The Yueyang Tower by Ma Zhiyuan.
- The Bamboo-leaved Boat (竹葉船; zhú yè chuán) by Fan Zi'an (范子安; fàn zǐ ān).
- The Willow in the South of the City (城南柳; chéng nán liǔ) by Gu Zijing (谷子敬; gǔ zǐ jìng).
- The most significant is The Eight Immortals Depart and Travel to the East (八仙出處東遊記; bā xiān chū chù dōng yoú jì) by Wu Yuantai (吳元泰; wú yuán taì) in the Ming Dynasty.

- There is another work, also made during the Ming (c. 14th–15th centuries), by an anonymous writer, called The Eight Immortals Cross the Sea (八仙過海; bā xiān guò hǎi). It is about the Immortals on their way to attend the Conference of the Magical Peach (蟠桃會; pán taó huì) when they encounter the Bohai Sea. Instead of relying on their clouds to get them across, Lü Dongbin suggested that they each should exercise their unique powers to get across. Derived from this, the Chinese proverb "The Eight Immortals cross the sea, each reveals its divine powers" (八仙過海，各顯神通; bā xiān guò hǎi, gè xiǎn shén tōng) indicates the situation that everybody shows off their skills and expertise to achieve a common goal.

== In qigong and martial arts ==
The Eight Immortals have been linked to the initial development of qigong exercises such as the Eight Piece Brocade. There are also some Chinese martial arts styles named after them, which use fighting techniques that are attributed to the characteristics of each immortal. Some drunken boxing styles make extensive use of the Eight Immortals archetypes for conditioning, qigong/meditation and combat training. One subsection of ba ying quan(八英拳; bā yīng quán) drunken fist training includes methodologies for each of the eight immortals.

== Worship ==
Established in the Song Dynasty, the Xi'an temple Eight Immortals Palace (八仙宮), formerly Eight Immortals Nunnery (八仙庵), has a collection of statues depicting the Immortals in what is called the Hall of Eight Immortals (八仙殿). According to legend, the palace was built atop an ancient wine shop and was constructed to protect the region from divine thunder. There are also many other shrines dedicated to them throughout China and Taiwan. In Singapore, the Xian'gu Temple (仙姑殿) is dedicated to the Immortal Lady He from the group as its focus of devotion.

Overall in the Sinosphere, the Eight Immortals are depicted as deities, although they are often not seen as such, being more like folk heroes and saints to most who venerate them. However, to these people, the Immortals often "represent ... the close ties between the living and the deceased, since the spirits of the deceased are always within reach when help in needed" in some branches of Chinese folk religion and their existence is seen as being similar to ghosts as well.

== Depictions in popular culture ==
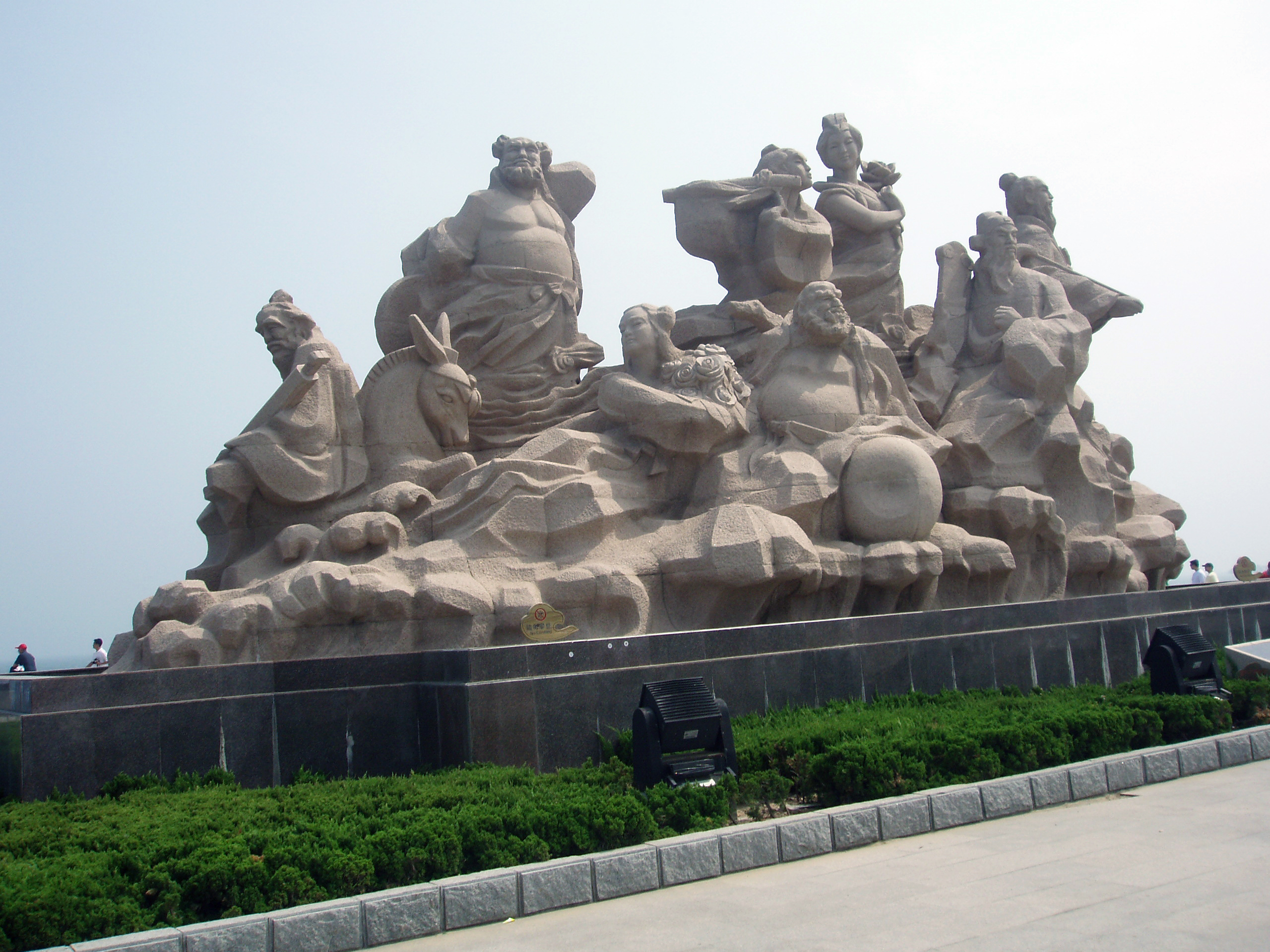
Statue of the Eight Immortals in Penglai City, Shandong

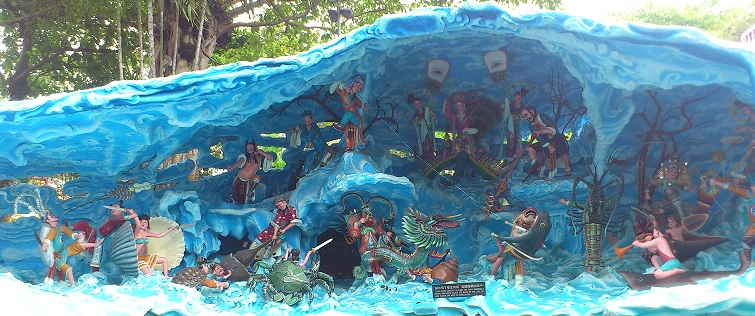
Diorama at Haw Par Villa, Singapore, depicting the battle between the Eight Immortals and the forces of the Dragon King of the East Sea

The Immortals are the subject of many depictions in popular culture, including:

- In Jackie Chan's films Drunken Master and Drunken Master II, there are eight "drunken" Chinese martial arts forms that are said to be originated from the Eight Immortals. At first, the protagonist did not want to learn the Immortal Lady He form because he saw it as feminine, but he eventually created his own version of it.
- The 1998–99 Singaporean television series Legend of the Eight Immortals was based on stories of the Eight Immortals and adapted from the novel Dong You Ji.
- The Eight Immortals play an important part in the plot of the video game Fear Effect 2.
- In the Andy Seto graphic novel series Saint Legend, the Eight Immortals reappear to protect the Buddhist faith from evil spirits set on destroying it.
- The Eight Immortals played a role in the animated show Jackie Chan Adventures. In the show, the Immortals were said to be the ones who defeated the Eight Demon Sorcerers and sealed them away in the netherworld using items that symbolized their powers. They then crafted the Pan'ku box as a key to opening the portals that lead into the demons' prison. Later on in the series, the items the Immortals used to seal away the demons the first time are revealed to have absorbed some of the demons' chi and become the targets of Drago, the son of Shendu (one of the Demon Sorcerers), to enhance his own powers.
- In The Forbidden Kingdom, Jackie Chan plays the character Lu Yan, who is supposed to be one of the Eight Immortals, as revealed by the director in the movie's special feature, The Monkey King and The Eight Immortals.
- In The Iron Druid Chronicles, Zhang Guolao joins the party journeying to Asgard to slay Thor in vengeance for the Norse gods crimes. Zhang Guolao's grudge stems from Thor killing his donkey in a trick.
- The 2026 film All Wishes Come True by Mu Zhengyang will be based on the story The Eight Immortals Cross the Sea.
