= Cao Guojiu =

One of the Eight Taoist Immortals

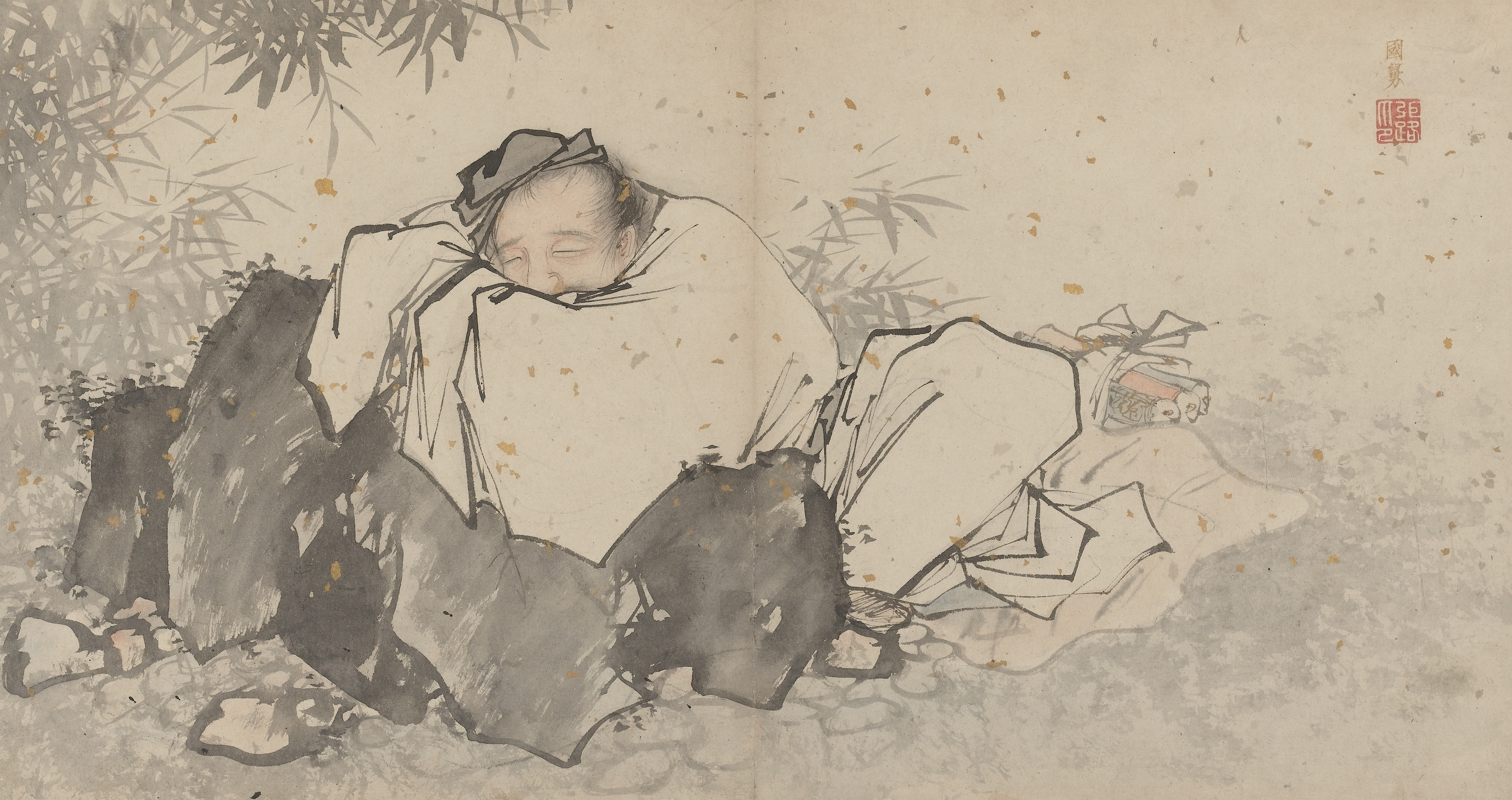
- Zhang Lu's painting of Cao Guojiu, early 16th century
- Traditional Chinese: 曹國舅
- Simplified Chinese: 曹国舅
- Literal meaning: Imperial Uncle Cao
Transcriptions
Standard Mandarin
- Hanyu Pinyin: Cáo Guójiù
- Wade–Giles: Tsao Kuo-chiu
Yue: Cantonese
- Yale Romanization: Chòuh Gwok Káuh
- Jyutping: Cou4 Gwok3 Kau5

Cao Yi
- Chinese: 曹佾
Transcriptions
Standard Mandarin
- Hanyu Pinyin: Cáo Yì
- Wade–Giles: Tsao I
Yue: Cantonese
- Yale Romanization: Chòuh Yaht
- Jyutping: Cou4 Jat6

Jingxiu
- Chinese: 景休
Transcriptions
Standard Mandarin
- Hanyu Pinyin: Jǐngxiū
- Wade–Giles: Ching-hsiu
Yue: Cantonese
- Yale Romanization: Gíng Yāu
- Jyutping: Ging2 Jau1

Cao Guojiu, literally Imperial Brother-in-law Cao, is a Chinese mythological figure and one of the Eight Immortals in the Taoist pantheon. His real name was Cao Yi while his courtesy name was Jingxiu, and he was better known to his contemporaries as Cao Jingxiu.

Cao's younger brother, Cao Jingzhi (曹景植), abused his relationship with the imperial family by bullying others and engaging in corrupt practices. Cao tried to persuade his brother to change his ways but he did not listen. In the meantime, he also used his family fortune to help the poor and tried to make up for his brother's misdeeds. One day, Cao Jingzhi was accused by other officials in the imperial court of corruption and abuse of power. Cao Guojiu felt so ashamed and disappointed by his brother's misconduct that he gave up his official career and went to the countryside to lead a reclusive life. During this time, he met the immortals Zhongli Quan and Lü Dongbin, who taught him Taoist magical arts. After many years of practice and cultivation, Cao himself also became an immortal.

In other versions of his myth, he was Emperor Renzong's actual brother and attempted to reform Renzong due to his political corruption.

Cao is often depicted dressed in official robes and holding a jade tablet or paiban (clapper). He is also regarded as the patron deity of acting and theatre.
