= Qianliyan =

Chinese god

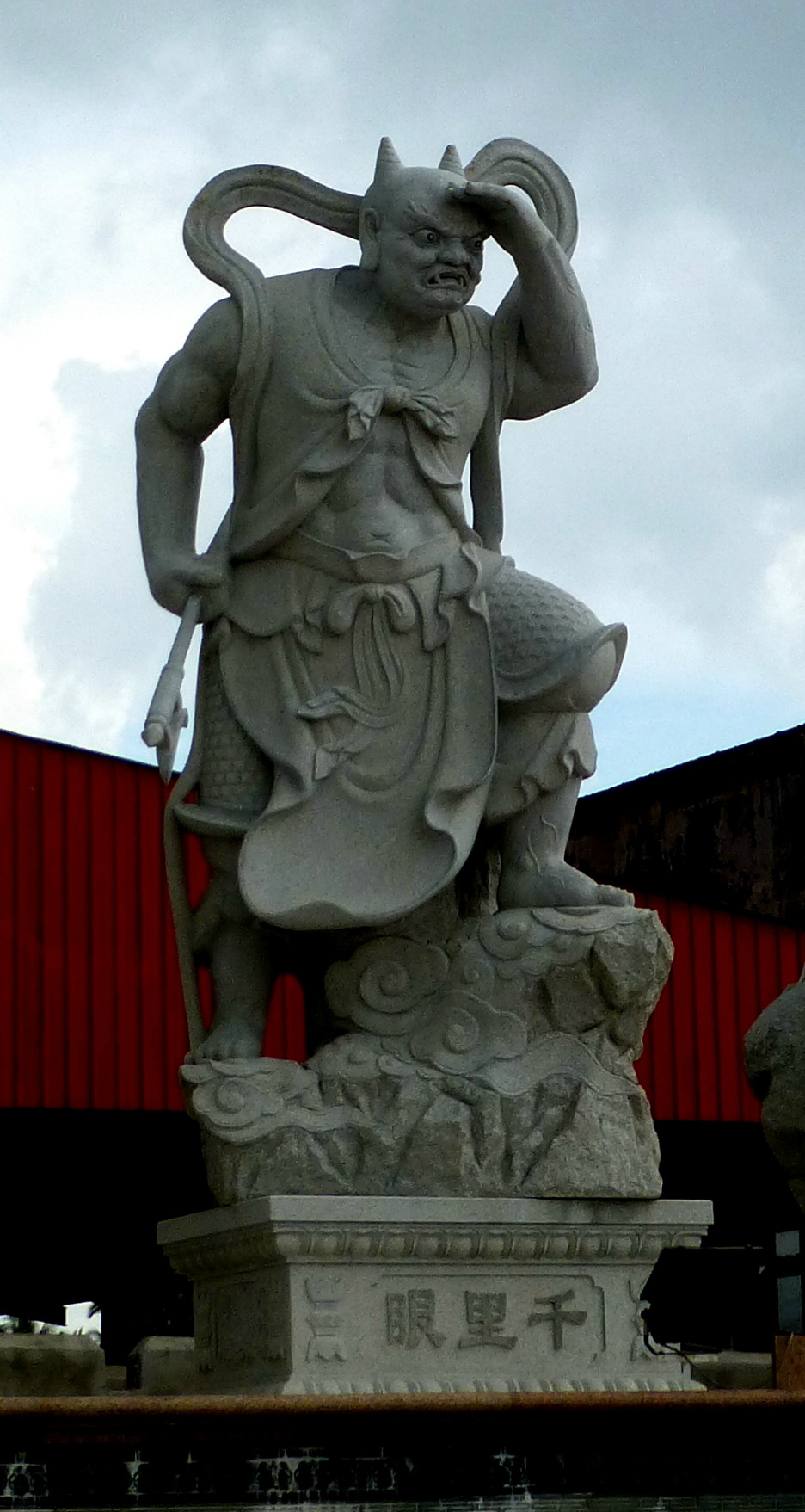
- A statue of Qianliyan in Perak, Malaysia
- Chinese: 千里眼
- Literal meaning: Thousand-Li Eye(s)
Transcriptions
Standard Mandarin
- Hanyu Pinyin: Qiānlǐyǎn
- Wade–Giles: Ch‘ien-li-yen

Li Lou
- Traditional Chinese: 離婁
- Simplified Chinese: 离娄
Transcriptions
Standard Mandarin
- Hanyu Pinyin: Lí Lóu
- Wade–Giles: Li Lou

Qianliyan is a Chinese sea and door god. He usually appears with Shunfeng'er as a guardian of the temples of the sea goddess Mazu.

== Name ==
The name "Qianliyan" literally means "Thousand Li Eyes" or "League Eyes" but may be taken more generally as "Hawkeye", "Lynx-Eyed", "Far-Seeing", or even "All-Seeing" or "Clairvoyant" as a distance of 1,000 li was idiomatic in Chinese for any great distance. It also appears as Qianli Yan and Qian Li Yan. His partner Shunfeng'er's name similarly means "Sharp-Eared" or "All-Hearing".

Under the Ming, Qianliyan was also known as Li Lou.

== History ==
Qianliyan is first attested in the early-16th century novel Journey to the West, where he appears as the personified form of the Taoist Jade Emperor's eyes and one of his lieutenants. There is, however, an earlier depiction of him in the caves of Shimen (t 石門山, s 石门山, Shíménshān) in Sichuan which has been dated to the Southern Song. The Chinese folk tale about the Ten Brothers also probably long predates its first publication during the Ming Dynasty; in it, the eldest two brothers have powers just like those of Qianliyan and Shunfeng'er.

Qianliyan next appeared as a lieutenant of the Emperor of Flowering Brightness (t 華光大帝, s 华光大帝, Huáguāng Dàdì) in Yu Xiangdou's Journey to the South and as a character in Xu Zhonglin's Creation of the Gods. He was confused with the door god Shenshu (神荼, Shēnshū) and, particularly, gradually conflated with the earlier sea god Zhaobao Qilang (招宝七郎, Zhāobǎo Qīláng) as he was supplanted by the cult of Mazu.

== Religion stories ==
Qianliyan's sharp vision is employed to help protect sailors at night and during fog and other inclement weather. In some accounts, he is capable of seeing everything in the world.

Qianliyan is most often portrayed as a demon defeated and tamed or befriended by the sea goddess Mazu. By one account, he and Shunfeng'er appeared off Meizhou Island during a storm and were defeated by Mazu's magical silk scarf, which blew clouds of sand into their eyes and ears. After their submission, they pledged their loyalty when she kindly healed them of the damage she had caused them. In another, the two were Song generals who competed for her hand at Peach Blossom Mountain (桃花山, Táohuā Shān) but were both defeated by her kung fu. In another, the two were the brothers Gao Ming and Gao Jue. Ruthless generals, they fell at Peach Blossom Mountain and subsequently haunted it as demons. They appeared to Mazu when she traveled nearby and challenged her to battle, with the loser to do the winner's bidding. They intended to have her marry them both but were defeated by her magic and became her servants. In still another, the Gao brothers were bandits during the Shang before they began to haunt the mountain.

In still another account, the pair were originally warriors or guards of Di Xin. In this version of the story, they are sometimes said to have already possessed their superhuman powers and to have used them to foil the first moves towards rebellion by the Zhou. Ji Fa's advisor Jiang Ziya is made out to have been a Taoist adept, however, who uses the esoteric knowledge he received from the Primordial Lord of Heaven on Mount Kunlun to defeat them. Their powers fail them when he covers them in the blood of a black dog and Ji Fa is able to triumph at Muye and finally establish himself as the Martial King of Zhou ("King Wu").

== Legacy ==
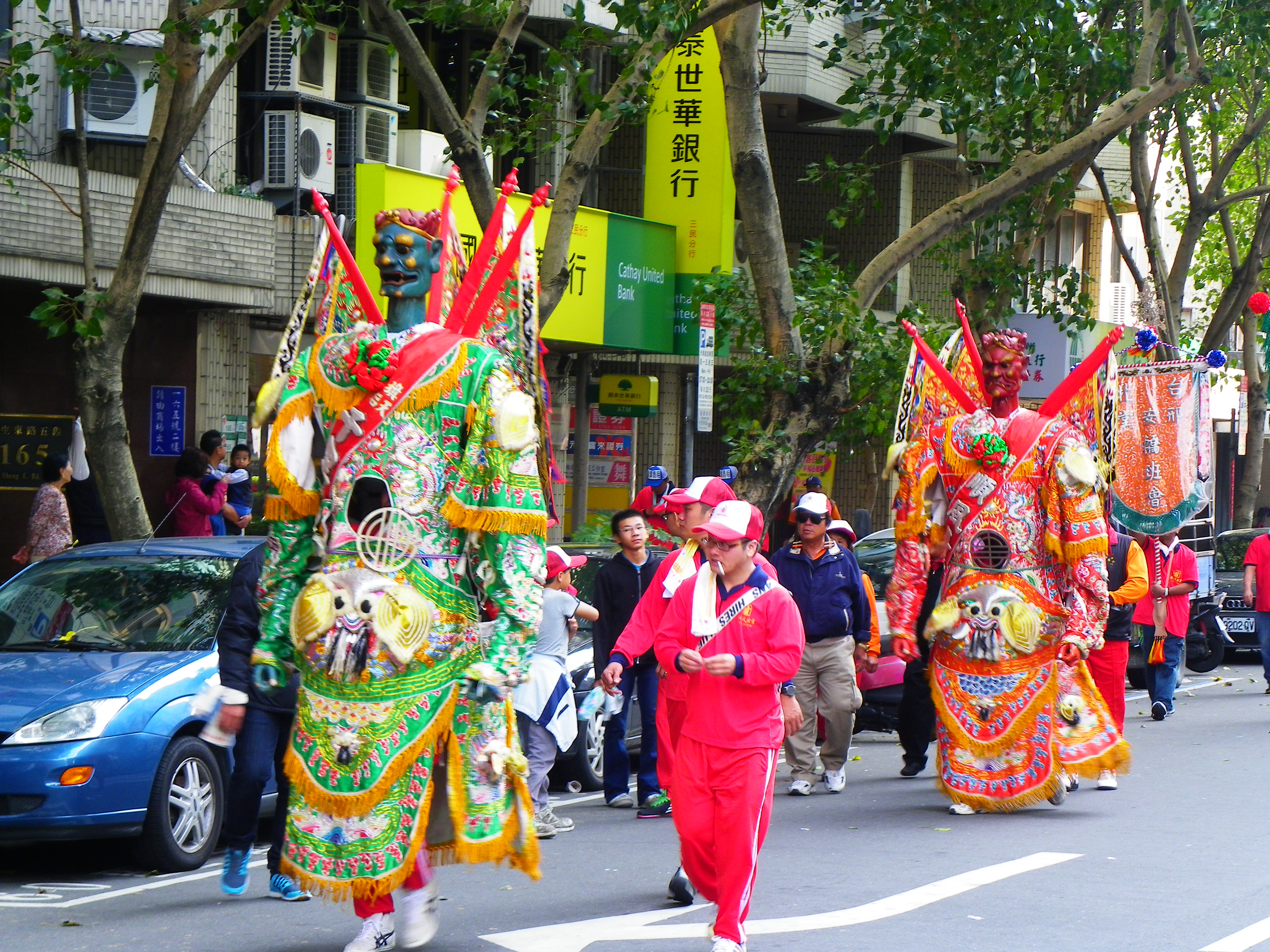
Actors portraying Qianliyan and Shunfeng'er during a parade in Taipei.

=== Worship ===
Qianliyan most often appears as a door god at Mazuist temples or as a guardian beside Mazu at her altars or on her yellow paper charms. He is separately worshipped in some villages and by mariners for assistance avoiding danger. During the 8-day, 250-kilometer (155 mi) annual pilgrimages from Dajia to Beigang, Mazu's idol is accompanied by 10-foot (3 m) figures of Qianliyan and Shunfeng'er played by masked men on stilts.

=== In art ===
Qianliyan typically appears as a green-skinned demon shielding his eyes from the sun's glare. This was not his original position: The Southern Song statue mentioned above and another in the Nanhai Longwang Temple (t 南海龍王廟, s 南海龙王庙, Nánhǎi Lóngwáng Miào) in eastern Guangzhou in Guangdong give him three eyes but do not have either of his hands raised to his brow. He apparently picked up the pose from the earlier Zhaobao Qilang as that god's followers came to worship Mazu. Qianliyan also occasionally appears with three heads and six arms. He usually appears to the right of his companion Shunfeng'er. He sometimes appears as the red demon, in which case he usually has two horns and yellow sapphire eyes.

=== Linguistic ===
In Chinese, Qianliyan's meaning of "thousand-mile eyes" is used to convey clairvoyance or clairvoyant.
