= Shunfeng'er =

Chinese sea god

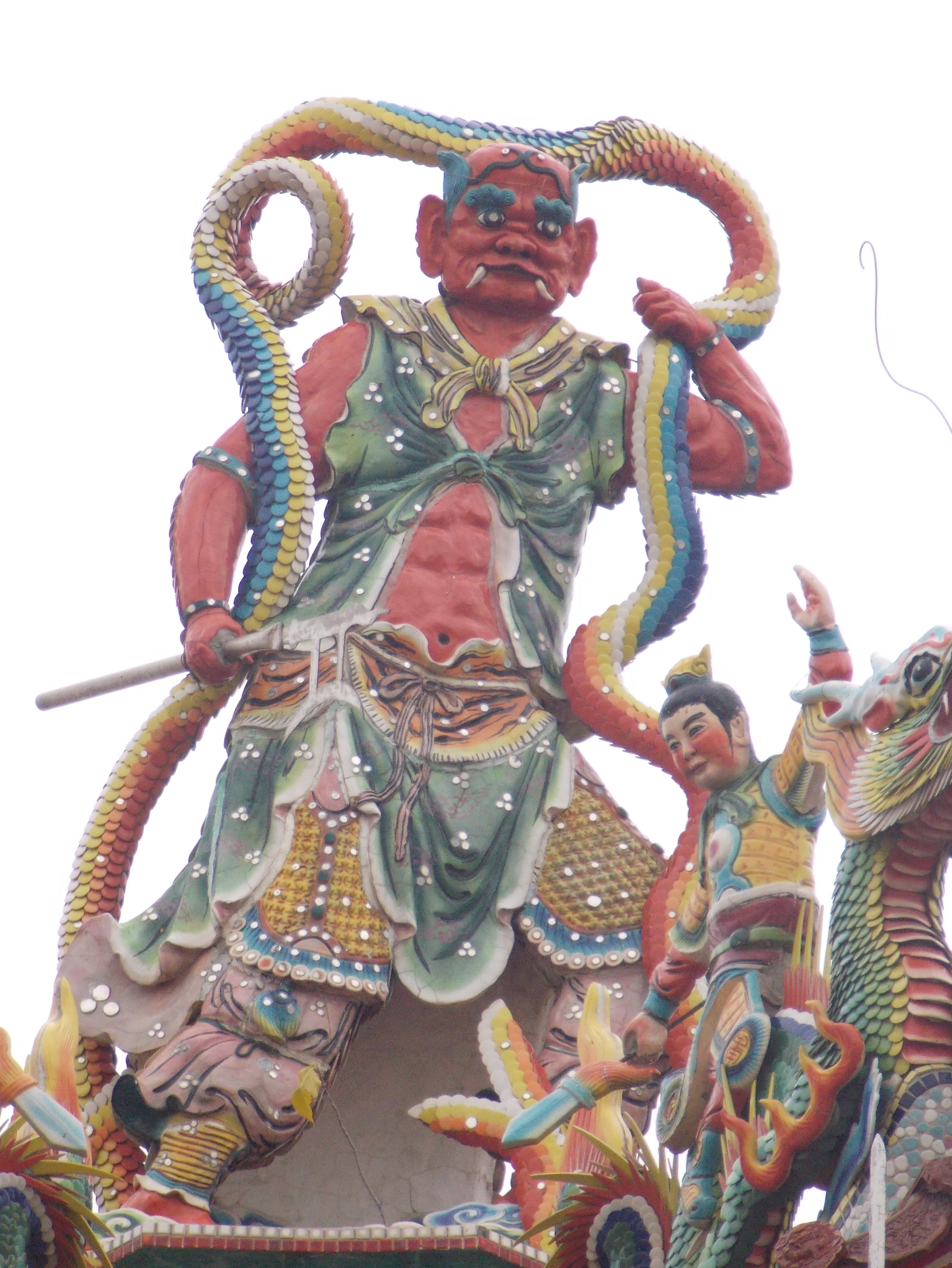
- A statue of Shunfeng'er at Longde Temple in Tainan
- Traditional Chinese: 順風耳
- Simplified Chinese: 顺风耳
- Literal meaning: Wind-following Ear(s)
Transcriptions
Standard Mandarin
- Hanyu Pinyin: Shùnfēng'ěr
- Wade–Giles: Shun-fêng-êrh

Wanli'er
- Traditional Chinese: 萬里耳
- Simplified Chinese: 万里耳
- Literal meaning: Myriad-Mile Ear(s)
Transcriptions
Standard Mandarin
- Hanyu Pinyin: Wànlǐ'ěr
- Wade–Giles: Wan-li-êrh

Shi Kuang
- Traditional Chinese: 師曠
- Simplified Chinese: 师旷
Transcriptions
Standard Mandarin
- Hanyu Pinyin: Shī Kuàng
- Wade–Giles: Shih Kʻuang

Shunfeng'er is a Chinese sea and door god. He usually appears with Qianliyan as a guardian of the temples of the sea goddess Mazu.

== Name ==
The name "Shunfeng'er" literally means "Wind Accompanying Ears" in reference to his ability to hear any sound carried upon the wind. The unusual idiom is translated variously as "Ears that Hear with the Wind", "Ears that Hear what Comes on the Wind", "Ears that Hear the Sounds Taken with the Wind", "Wind-Accompanying Ears", "Downwind Ears", or even "Sharp Ears", "Far-Hearing", or "All-Hearing". The god's role in helping sailors distinguish favorable winds also prompts the translations "Fair-Wind Ears" and "Favorable-Wind Ears".

It also appears as Shunfeng Er and Shen Feng Er. His partner Qianliyan's name similarly means "Sharp-Eyed" or "All-Seeing".

Under the Ming, Shunfeng'er was also known as Shi Kuang. He is also sometimes known as Wanli'er, which has similar meaning, as the Chinese word wàn—like the English "myriad"—simultaneously means the number 10,000 and "innumerable" or "uncountably vast".

== History ==
Shunfeng'er is first attested in the early-16th century novel Journey to the West, where he appears as the personified form of the Taoist Jade Emperor's ears and one of his lieutenants. There is, however, an earlier depiction of him in a Sichuan cave which has been dated to the Southern Song. The Chinese folk tale about the Ten Brothers also probably long predates its first publication during the Ming Dynasty; in it, the eldest two brothers have powers just like those of Qianliyan and Shunfeng'er.

Shunfeng'er next appeared as a lieutenant of the Emperor of Flowering Brightness (t 華光大帝, s 华光大帝, Huáguāng Dàdì) in Yu Xiangdou's Journey to the South and as a character in Xu Zhonglin's Creation of the Gods. He was confused with the door god Yulü (t 鬱壘, s 郁垒, Yùlǜ).

== Religion stories ==
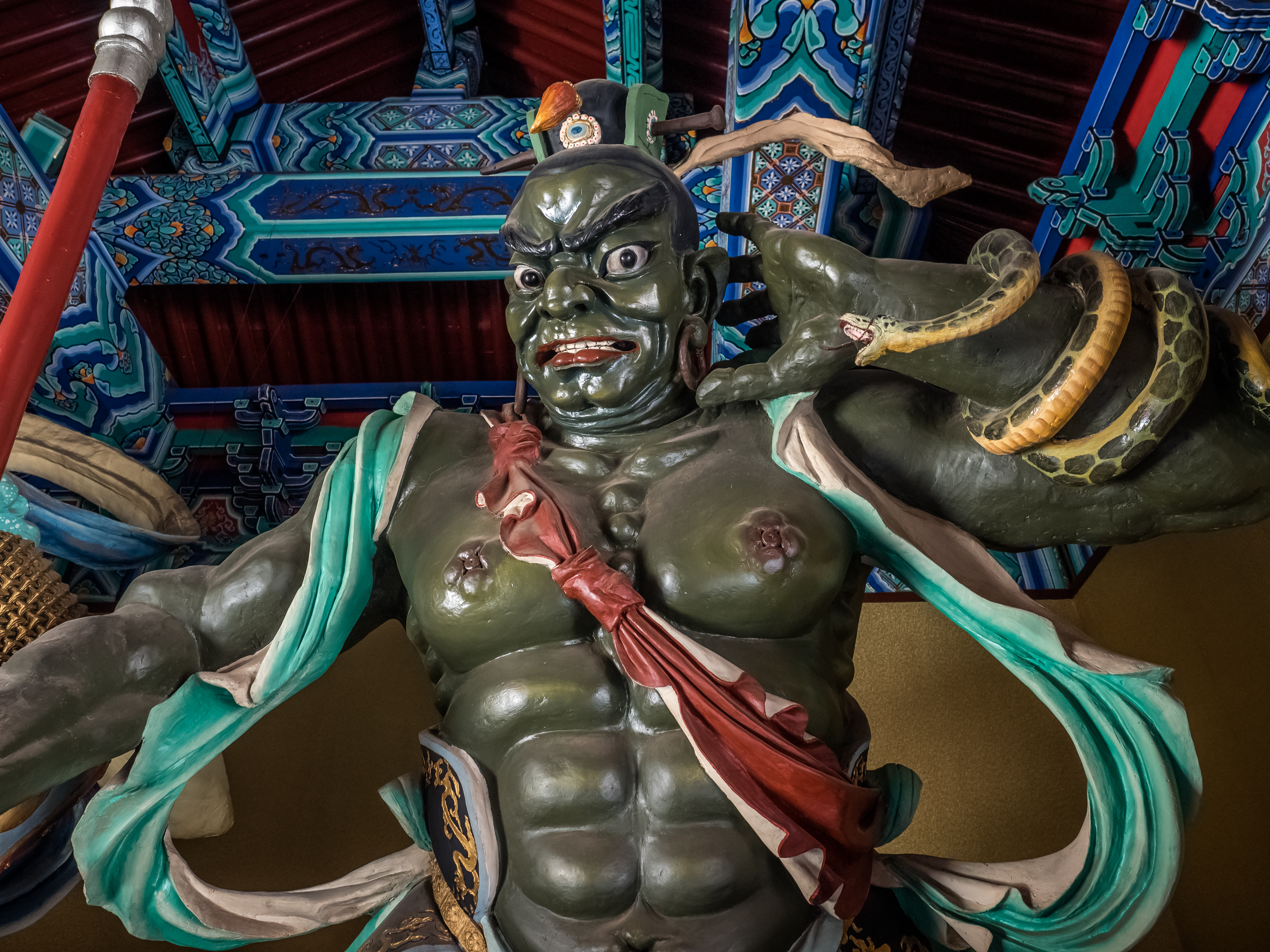
A green-skinned Shunfeng'er at Tianjin's Queen of Heaven Palace.

Shunfeng'er's sharp hearing is employed to help sailors distinguish favorable winds from coming storms. In some accounts, he is capable of hearing everything in the world, no matter how quietly spoken, and was therefore also worshipped as a witness and guarantor of oaths and contracts.

Shunfeng'er is most often portrayed as a demon defeated and tamed or befriended by the sea goddess Mazu. By one account, he and Qianliyan appeared off Meizhou Island during a storm and were defeated by Mazu's magical silk scarf, which blew clouds of sand into their ears and eyes. After their submission, they pledged their loyalty when she kindly healed them of the damage she had caused them. In another, the two were Song generals who competed for her hand at Peach Blossom Mountain (桃花山, Táohuā Shān) but were both defeated by her kung fu. In another, the two were the brothers Gao Jue and Gao Ming. Ruthless generals, they fell at Peach Blossom Mountain and subsequently haunted it as demons. They appeared to Mazu when she traveled nearby and challenged her to battle, with the loser to do the winner's bidding. They intended to have her marry them both but were defeated by her magic and became her servants. In still another, the Gao brothers were bandits during the Shang before they began to haunt the mountain.

In still another account, the pair were originally warriors or guards of Di Xin. In this version of the story, they are sometimes said to have already possessed their superhuman powers and to have used them to foil the first moves towards rebellion by the Zhou. Ji Fa's advisor Jiang Ziya is made out to have been a Taoist adept, however, who uses the esoteric knowledge he received from the Primordial Lord of Heaven on Mount Kunlun to defeat them. Their powers fail them when he covers them in the blood of a black dog and Ji Fa is able to triumph at Muye and finally establish himself as the Martial King of Zhou ("King Wu").

== Legacy ==
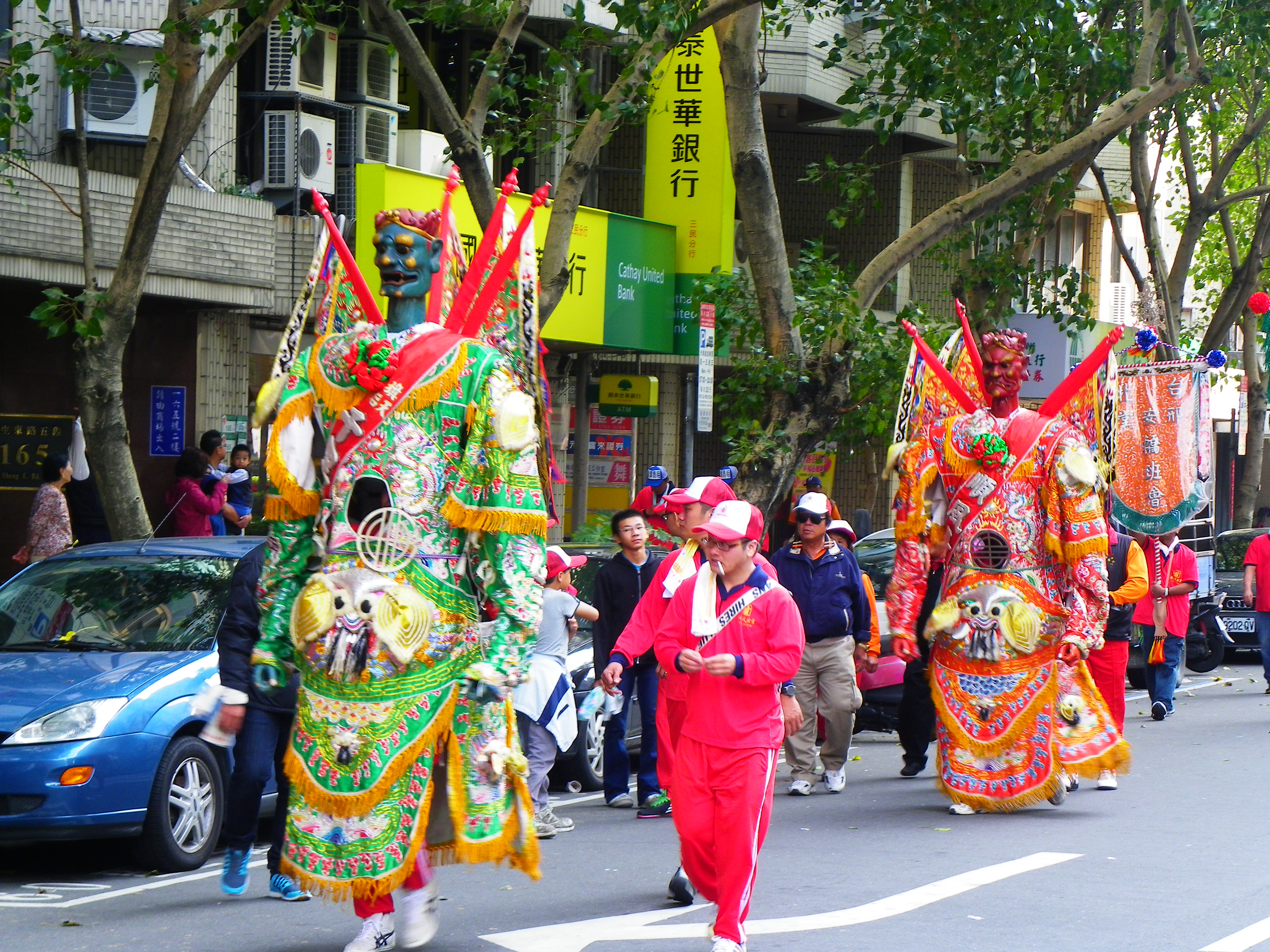
Actors portraying Qianliyan and Shunfeng'er during a parade in Taipei.

=== Worship ===
Shunfeng'er most often appears as a door god at Mazuist temples or as a guardian beside Mazu at her altars or on her yellow paper charms. He is separately worshipped in some villages or by mariners for assistance avoiding danger. During the 8-day, 250-kilometer (155 mi) annual pilgrimages from Dajia to Beigang, Mazu's idol is accompanied by 10-foot (3 m) figures of Shunfeng'er and Qianliyan played by masked men on stilts.

=== In art ===
Shunfeng'er typically appears as a red- or brown-skinned demon cupping a hand to one of his ears. He also occasionally appears with three heads and six arms. He usually appears to the left of his companion Qianliyan. Sometimes Shunfeng'er appears as the green demon, in which case he usually has one horn and ruby eyes.
