= Hong Hai Er (disambiguation) =

Hong Hai Er (simplified Chinese: 红孩儿; traditional Chinese: 紅孩兒; pinyin: Hóng Hái Er) is the Chinese name of Red Boy, a character in the Chinese classical novel Journey to the West. It may also refer to:

- Hong Hai Er (band), a Taiwanese boy band in the 1990s.
- Films:
  - Hong Hai Er (1928 film), a 1928 Chinese film directed by Gu Wuwei and starring Gu Baolian.
  - The Fantastic Magic Baby, a 1975 Hong Kong film.
  - Fire Ball (2005 film), a 2005 Taiwanese animated film from Wang Film Productions.
