= The Fantastic Magic Baby =

1975 Hong Kong film by Chang Cheh

- Film poster
- Directed by: Chang Cheh
- Written by: Ni Kuang; Chang Cheh
- Starring: Ting Wa Chung; Lau Chung-Chun; Tang Gok-Yan; Chen I-Ho; Yeung Fui-Yuk
- Cinematography: Kung Mu-To
- Edited by: Kwok Ting Hung
- Music by: Frankie Chan
- Distributed by: Shaw Brothers Studio
- Release date: 15 August 1975 (Hong Kong)
- Running time: 96 minutes
- Country: Hong Kong
- Language: Mandarin

The Fantastic Magic Baby (紅孩兒) is a 1975 Hong Kong film directed by Chang Cheh. The film is based on selected chapters of Wu Cheng'en's classical 16th century novel Journey to the West focusing on the story of Red Boy.

== Main cast ==
- Ting Wa Chung as Red Boy
- Lau Chung-Chun as Sun Wukong
- Tang Gok-Yan as Tang Priest Tripitaka
- Chen I-Ho as Zhu Bajie
- Yeung Fui-Yuk as Sha Wujing
- Chiang Tao as Bull Demon King
- Woo Gam as Princess Iron Fan
- Fung Hak-On as Erlang Shen
- Chao Li-Chuan as Guan Yin
- Tsai Hung as Juling Shen
