= Journey to the East (disambiguation) =

Journey to the East is a 1932 German novel by Hermann Hesse.

Journey to the East may also refer to:

- Journey to the East, a 16th-century Chinese novel by Wu Yuantai and one of the Four Journeys
- Legend of the Eight Immortals, 1998–1999 Singaporean TV series based on Wu Yuantai's novel
- Đông Du, an early-20th century Vietnamese political movement which encouraged young Vietnamese to go to Japan

== See also ==
- Journey to the West (disambiguation)
- Journey to the North
