= Journey to the South =

Ming dynasty novel by Yu Xiangdou

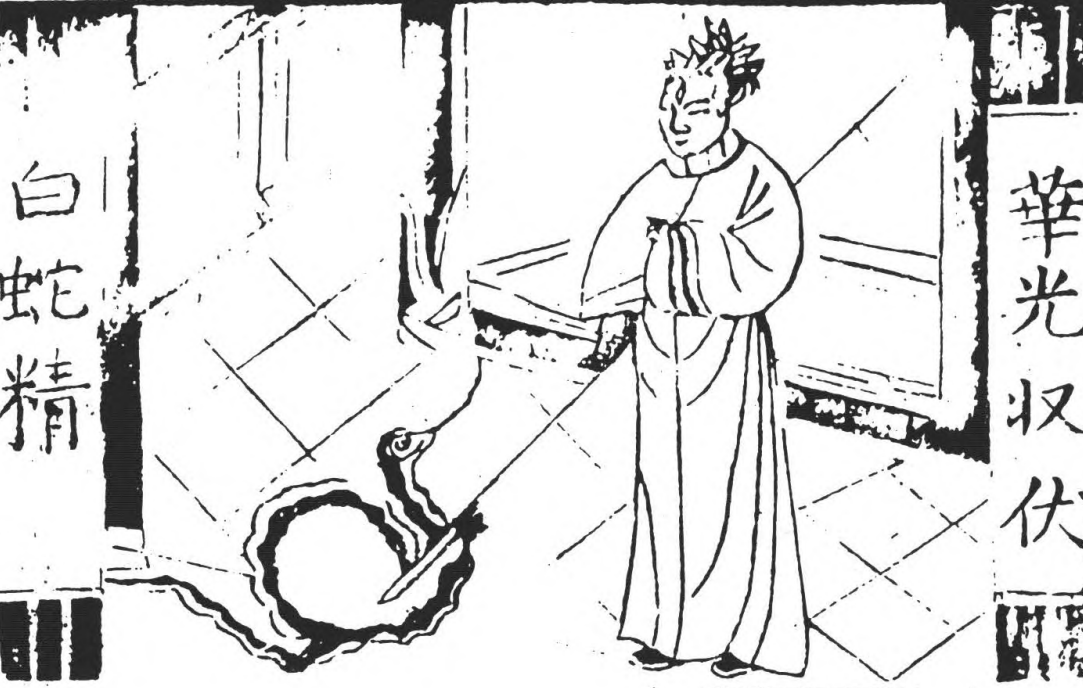
- Ming dynasty illustration of Huaguang subduing the white snake
- Author: Yu Xiangdou
- Original title: 南遊記
- Language: Written vernacular Chinese
- Genre: Gods and demons fiction, Chinese mythology, fantasy, adventure
- Publication date: 1571 or 1631 (earliest surviving print)
- Publication place: China

The Legend of King Huaguang's Journey to the South (華光天王南遊志傳, Huaguang Tianwang Nanyou zhizhuan), usually referred to as Journey to the South (zh:南遊記, Nanyou ji), is a Chinese shenmo novel by Yu Xiangdou (余象斗). First published in the seventeenth century during the Ming dynasty, it tells the story of the celestial being Huaguang, who is reincarnated three times as a result of his transgressions. It was later included in the anthology Four Journeys.

== Plot ==
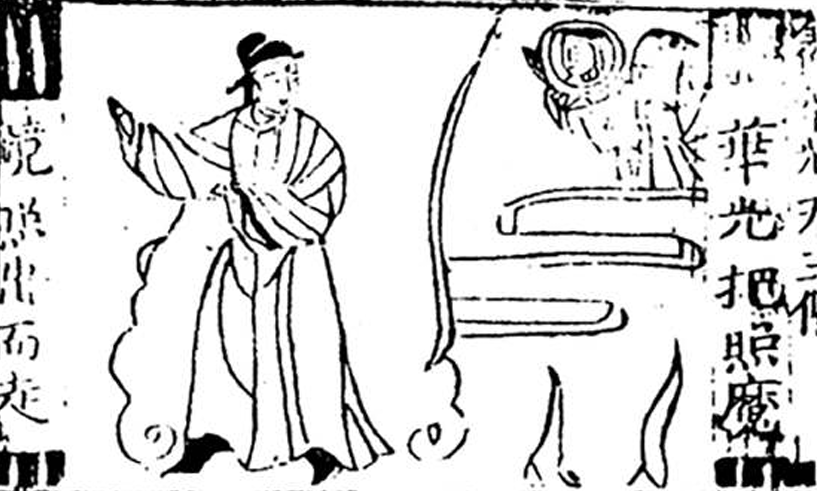
Ming dynasty illustration of Huaguang infiltrating the netherworld

Originally the flame produced by an oil lamp, Huaguang (華光) is transformed by the Buddha into a fire deity. Sometime later, a demon known as Single Fire Great King (Note: In Chinese: Duohuo dawang (獨火大王)) gatecrashes a vegetarian feast at Vulture Peak, causing the Buddha's congregation to panic. Huaguang burns the demon to death. Alarmed by his cruelty, the Buddha decrees that he has to be reborn.

Huaguang is first reincarnated as the son of the Goddess of the Horse-Ear Mountain, (Note: Ma'er shan niangniang (馬耳山娘娘)) whose husband has been slain by the Dragon King. (Note: According to Mahayana mythology, the Horse-Ear Mountain King "(corresponds) to one of the ten stages of Bodhisattva practice.") She names her son Three-Eyed Divine Radiance (Note: Sanyan ling'guang (三眼靈耀)) since he is born with three eyes. Three days later, he slays the Dragon King. However, Huaguang subsequently steals the golden lance of the Ziwei Emperor and is crushed to death by him.

In his second reincarnation, Huaguang becomes the son of the Red-Bearded Blazing Demon Heavenly King (Note: Chixu Yanmo Tianwang (赤鬚炎魔天王)) and his wife. He becomes a disciple of the Buddha of Scorching Fire and Jade Radiance, (Note: Huoyan Yuguang Fo (火炎玉光佛)) who gives him a triangular golden brick that enables its wielder to transform at will. Huaguang then finds employment in the heavenly palace as the Great Marshal of the Fire-Department's Troops and Horses. (Note: Huobu bingma da yuanshuai (火部兵馬大元帥)) After a public dispute with the crown prince, however, Huaguang is excommunicated by the Jade Emperor, who dispatches the Perfect Warrior Dark Emperor of the North, (Note: Beifang Zhenwu Xuantian Shangdi (北方真武玄帝)) a water deity, to capture him. The Dark Emperor decides to free Huaguang after the latter pledges to renounce heresy.

Huaguang flees to the mortal world and becomes a popular demon slayer. To thank him for protecting the Country of a Thousand Fields, (Note: Qiantian guo (千田國)) the king presents Huaguang with his own temple, but this incurs the wrath of another fire deity, General Fire-Whirl, (Note: Huopiao Jiang (火漂將)) whose shrine had to be demolished to make way for Huaguang's. Fire-Whirl kidnaps the king's daughter but she is quickly rescued by Huaguang.

Realising that the Jade Emperor's men have discovered his new whereabouts, Huaguang enters a woman's womb once again. He is reborn in Wuyuan, Jiangxi as one of a certain Lady Xiao's quintuplets. The five boys become adults in just a few days; four of them elect to be ordained as monks, while the remaining child—Huaguang—stays behind to take care of his parents.

Unbeknownst to Huaguang, his mother is in fact a cannibalistic demon who has eaten the real Lady Xiao and usurped her identity. After his mother is captured by a dragon and sent to the netherworld, Huaguang disguises himself as a celestial messenger in an attempt to rescue her. This eventually leads to an extended skirmish between Huaguang and various Buddhist and Taoist authorities, including Manjushri, Samantabhadra, Guanyin, Nezha, and Princess Iron Fan. He defeats them all and even makes Princess Iron Fan his wife, although he loses his golden brick while battling Nezha.

As he resumes his search for his mother, Huaguang is impersonated by a malevolent Taoist—the self-proclaimed Great Immortal of Falling Stones (Note: Luoshi Daxian (落石大仙))—who accosts a girl in her own bedroom. Huaguang somehow intervenes and forces the Taoist to revert to its true form as a white snake, before appointing it as his attendant.

Descending into hell, Huaguang learns the truth about his mother from the real Lady Xiao. Nonetheless, he remains determined to free the demon. Huaguang impersonates the Monkey King and steals a few Peaches of Immortality from the Queen Mother of the West's garden. He returns to his mother and feeds her the peaches, thereby liberating her from her cannibalistic ways. Moved by Huaguang's filial piety, the Jade Emperor grants him a full pardon.

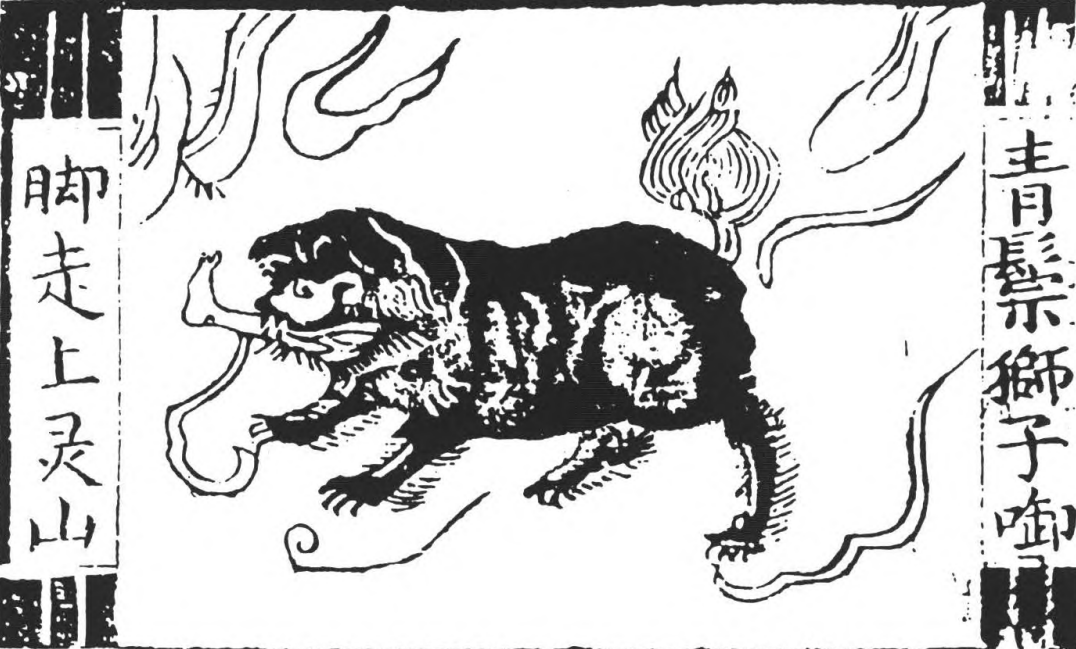
Ming dynasty illustration of Huaguang's amputated right leg being carried off by a lion

Meanwhile, the Buddha instructs his arhats to compel Huaguang to convert to Buddhism. Believing that he would be unlikely to do so on his own accord, the arhats resort to trickery: posing as magicians, they greet Huaguang and act as though they were amputating their limbs. Huaguang tries to mimick them but inadvertently cuts off his right leg for real. A lion appears out of nowhere and carries Huaguang's leg off in its teeth to the Buddha. Huaguang is forced to convert to Buddhism, following which the Jade Emperor confers upon him the title of "Great Emperor of Superior Morality among the Buddhas and Divine Agent of the Five Manifestations". (Note: Fozhong Shangshan Wuxian Ling'guan Dashi (佛中上善五顯靈官大帝))

== Publication history ==
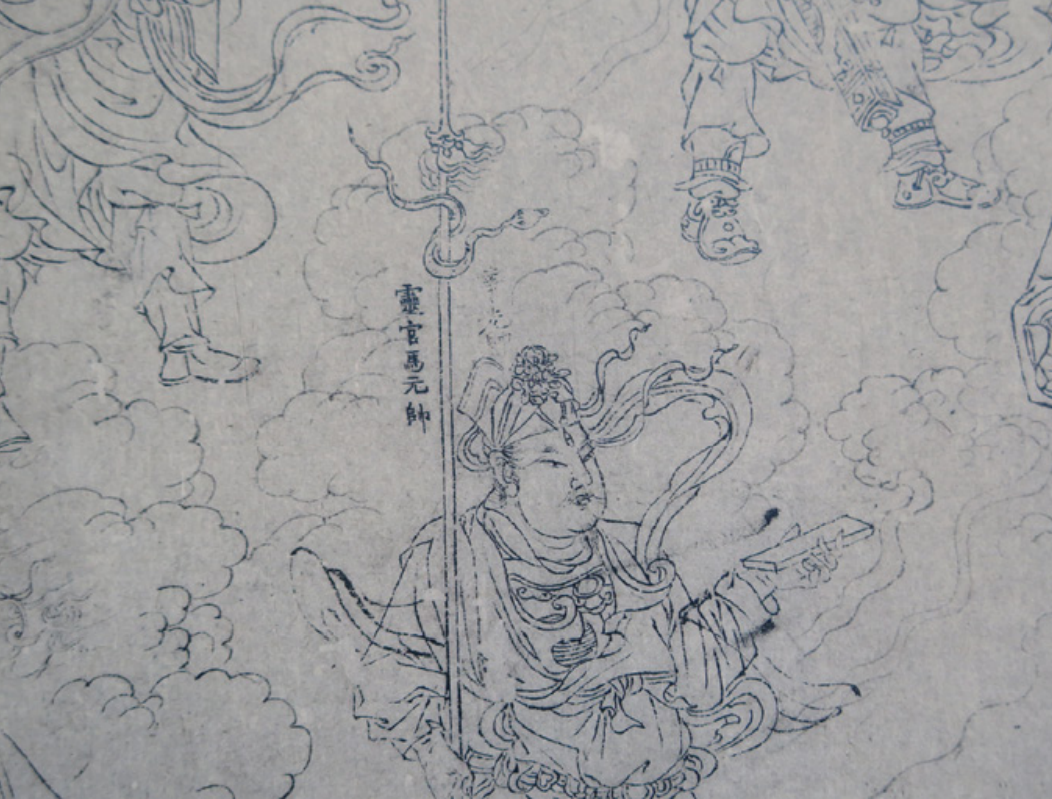
A twelfth-century depiction of Ling'guan Ma Yuanshuai (靈官馬元帥) or "Divine Official, Horse Marshal", Huaguang

Yu Xiangdou is credited with writing and publishing the novel during the Wanli era although much of its material probably came from earlier sources such as the missing opera Huaguang xian sheng (華光顯聖) or Huaguang Manifests His Holiness. Huaguang's descent into hell to save his mother, for instance, recalls the Chinese Buddhist fable Mulian Rescues His Mother. Some scholars, for instance Liu Ts'un-yan, have gone so far as to suggest that Yu merely republished an earlier version of the novel. (Note: A Huaguang zhuan (華光傳), which Cedzich asserts "must be identical" with Yu's novel, was already in circulation by 1586.) In any case, Yu also paired several passages in the novel with his own poems.

The protagonist in Yu's novel is the Taoist war deity Huaguang, who in turn was likely based on the three-eyed Horse King. (Note: Since as early as the twelfth century, the Horse King had already been popularly referred to by the name Huaguang (華光) or "Splendid Radiance".) The novel also contains allusions to the Wutong spirits and shanxiao (zh:獨腳鬼), (Note: A catch-all term referring to evil spirits that dwell in the wilderness. The Wutong spirits were initially thought of as a type of shanxiao but by the sixteenth century at the latest they had become rehabilitated as benevolent deities known as the Wuxian (五顯).) (Note: Moreover, by the Ming dynasty, the distinctions between the Horse King and Wutong/Wuxian cults had begun to blur. Richard von Glahn has argued that Yu's novel can be read as an "apologia intended to dispel the 'mistaken' association between Huaguang and the demonic Wutong, and in so doing recuperate Huaguang as a force for good.") for instance in Huaguang's loss of one leg at the end of the novel (both the Wutong spirits and shanxiao were popularly depicted as one-legged) and in his rebirth into the Xiao family (some sources claimed that the Wutong spirits were five brothers also surnamed Xiao).

The title of the novel, Huaguang Tianwang Nanyou zhihuan (华光天王南游志传), translated into English as the Heavenly King Huaguang's Journey to the South, (Note: The novel's alternative title is Quanxiang Wuxian Lingguan Dadi Huaguang Tianwang zhuan (全像五顯靈官大帝華光天王傳), translated into English as the Fully Illustrated Hagiography of the Heavenly King Huaguang, the Great Emperor and Divine Agent of the Five Manifestations. Versions distributed independently of the Four Journeys, such as by temples, use similar titles.) takes it cue from the classic Chinese novel Journey to the West, and there are numerous parallels between the plots of the two novels. At the same time, the title of Yu's novel is a nod to the Taoist association of fire—the element controlled by Huaguang—with the cardinal direction south.

The earliest surviving edition of the novel, an illustrated woodblock print housed at the British Museum, is dated to the "Xinwei" (辛未) year, which may refer to either 1571 or 1631. (Note: Cedzich argues that the latter date "appears more probable" based on when the earlier works that inspired Yu Xiangdou's were most likely published, i.e. in the 1570s or late 1580s.) Divided into four juan and eighteen chapters, the woodblocks for the text were carved by a certain Li Pu (李鋪). Every page of text has an illustration at the top.

In the early nineteenth century, the novel was reprinted together with Journey to the North (also by Yu Xiangdou), Wu Yuantai's Journey to the East (zh:東遊記), and Yang Zhihe's Journey to the West as part of a collection known as the Four Journeys.
