= Han Xiangzi =

One of the Eight Taoist Immortals

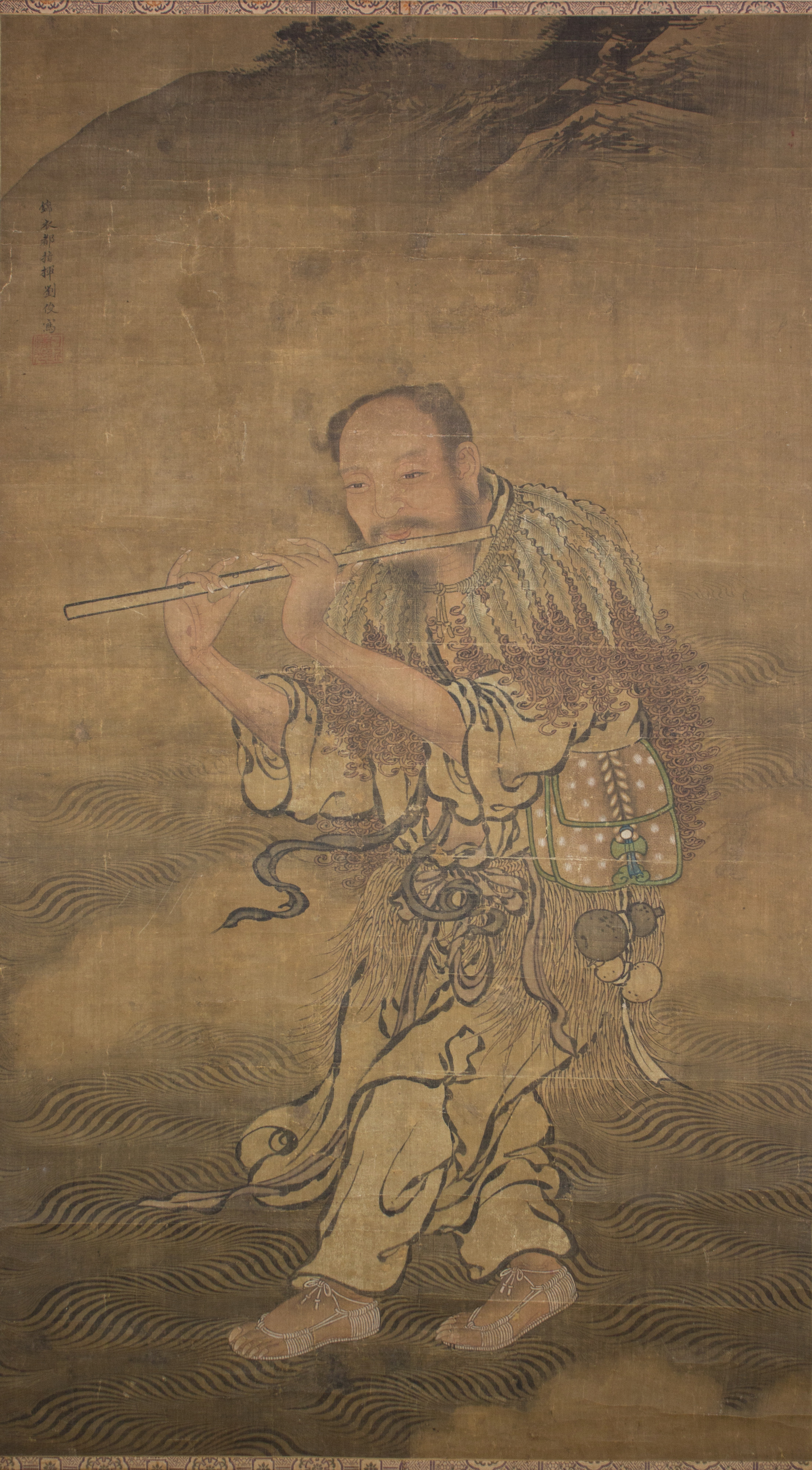
- The Taoist immortal Han Xiangzi, painted by Liu Jun, Ming dynasty
- Traditional Chinese: 韓湘子
- Simplified Chinese: 韩湘子
Transcriptions
Standard Mandarin
- Hanyu Pinyin: Hán Xiāngzǐ
- Wade–Giles: Han Hsiang-tzu
Yue: Cantonese
- Yale Romanization: Hòhn Sēung Jí
- Jyutping: Hon4 Soeng1 Zi2

Qingfu
- Chinese: 清夫
Transcriptions
Standard Mandarin
- Hanyu Pinyin: Qīngfū
- Wade–Giles: Ching-fu
Yue: Cantonese
- Yale Romanization: Chīng Fū
- Jyutping: Cing1 Fu1

Beizhu
- Chinese: 北渚
Transcriptions
Standard Mandarin
- Hanyu Pinyin: Běizhǔ
- Wade–Giles: Pei-chu
Yue: Cantonese
- Yale Romanization: Bāk Jyú
- Jyutping: Bak1 Zyu2

Han Xiangzi, courtesy name Qingfu or Beizhu, is a Chinese mythological figure and one of the Eight Immortals in the Taoist pantheon. He studied Taoist magical arts under the tutelage of Lü Dongbin, another of the Eight Immortals. Han Xiangzi is often depicted carrying a dizi (Chinese flute), so he is also regarded as the patron deity of flutists. He is also believed to be the composer of the Taoist musical piece Tian Hua Yin (天花引).

== Historical identity ==
It is not known if Han Xiangzi existed historically. However, he is believed to be Han Xiang, a grandnephew of Han Yu, a prominent politician, poet and Confucian scholar who lived in the Tang dynasty. There are at least three different accounts about Han Xiang and Han Yu's grandnephew.

Han Yu once dedicated three poems to his grandnephew, Han Xiang, whose courtesy name was "Qingfu". The three poems are Zuo Qian Zhi Languan Shi Zhisun Xiang (左遷至藍關示侄孫湘), and the two-part poem Su Zeng Jiang Kou Shi Zhisun Xiang (宿曾江口示侄孫湘). In 819, during the reign of Emperor Xianzong of Tang, the emperor arranged a grand ceremony for an alleged Buddhist relic to be escorted to the imperial palace in Chang'an and encouraged the people to worship the relic and donate to Buddhist monasteries. Han Yu wrote a memorial to Emperor Xianzong to advise him against doing so, and drew on the example of Emperor Wu of Liang and Hou Jing to caution the emperor. Emperor Xianzong was furious and wanted to execute Han Yu, but eventually pardoned him, demoted him, and sent him out of Chang'an to serve as the Prefect of Chao Prefecture (潮州; present-day Chaozhou, Guangdong). Along the way, Han Yu passed by Lan Pass (藍關; in present-day Lantian County, Xi'an, Shaanxi), where Han Xiang came to join him on his journey. Han Yu wrote the poem Zuo Qian Zhi Languan Shi Zhisun Xiang and dedicated it to Han Xiang.

The historical text New Book of Tang mentioned that Han Yu had a grandnephew, Han Xiang, whose courtesy name was "Beizhu". Han Xiang served as a da li cheng (大理丞), an official in the Ministry of Justice, under the Tang government.

In the miscellany Miscellaneous Morsels from Youyang, Han Yu had an unnamed grandnephew who lived in the Huai River region. He instructed his grandnephew to study Confucian classics in a school, but his grandnephew showed no interest in his studies and bullied his classmates. Han Yu then arranged for his grandnephew to study in a Buddhist school, but the abbot complained that he was defiant and reckless. Han Yu then brought his grandnephew home and scolded him for not spending his time productively. However, his grandnephew claimed that he had the special ability to change the colour of peony flowers, and demonstrated it in front of him. Han Yu was greatly surprised. His grandnephew then returned to the Huai River region and led the rest of his life as a simple commoner.

== Legends ==
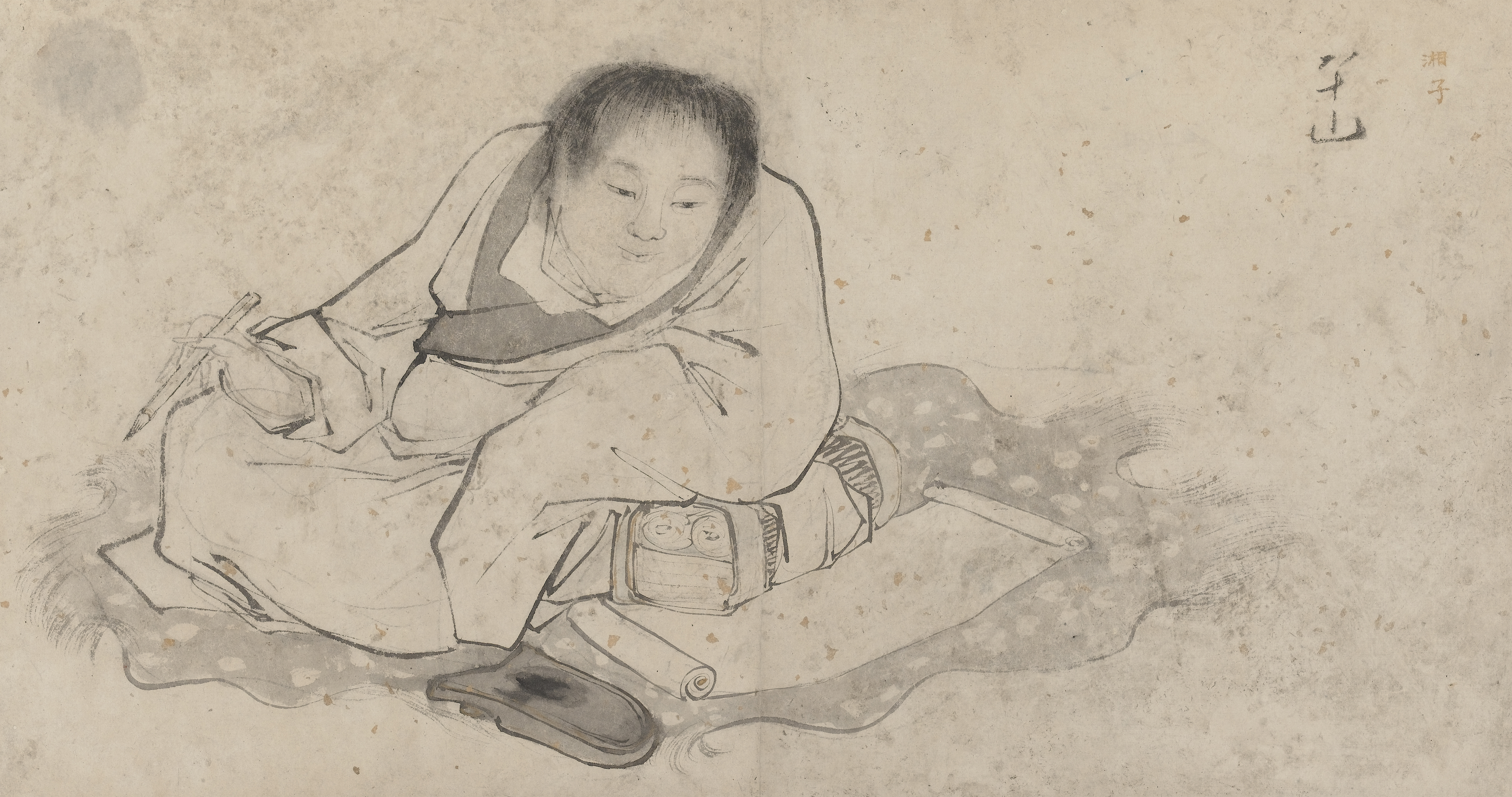
Zhang Lu's painting of Han Xiangzi, early 16th century

According to the 17th century novel Han Xianzi Quanzhuan 韓湘子全傳 (The Story of Han Xiangzi: The Alchemical Adventures of a Daoist Immortal), Han Xiangzi was a son of Han Hui, the elder brother of Han Yu (a famous statesman and poet from Tang Dynasty). After the death of Han Hui and his wife, Xiangzi was raised in Han Yu’s household, as if he was Han Yu’s son. Han Yu had great expectations of his nephew, unfortunately the latter had no intention of entering government service. Instead he liked to cultivate himself according to Taoist doctrine.

Han Yu then married his nephew to Lin Luying, the daughter of scholar Lin, in hopes that Xiangzi would forget his pursuit of Taoism and have more interest in worldly matters. However, Han Xiangzi never impregnated his wife, and several years later he ran away from home to join Lü Dongbin and Zhongli Quan. After Han Xiangzi successfully became immortal, he returned to earth to deliver his uncle, his aunt and his wife (so they could become immortals too). After several failed attempts to break Han Yu’s Confucian obstinacy, Xiangzi finally delivered him after saving his uncle’s life from a snowstorm at Languan (Blue Pass). Later he did the same to his aunt and wife.

There are similar stories of Han Xiangzi’s origin in other accounts such as The Eight Immortals Depart and Travel to the East (八仙出處東遊記; bā xiān chū chù dōng yoú jì) and "The Eight Immortals Achieving the Tao" (八仙得道 Baxian Dedao). However, the Dongyouji’s and Baxian Dedao’s version are shorter and didn’t mention Han Xiangzi’s marriage.

Han is often said to carry "a basket of flowers and a jade flute".

== Han Xiangzi’s Prophecy ==
This story was recorded in both Xiyouji (Journey to the West) and Han Xianzi Quanzhuan.

It was said that after achieving his immortality Han Xiangzi went to his uncle’s birthday. Han Yu once again tried to convince his nephew to abandon his pursuit of Taoism. In response, Xiangzi said that their paths were different. Before leaving, Xiangzi put some earth in a flower-pot and forthwith there came forth a bouquet of perfect peonies. On the petals of these flowers, written in gold, were two verses:

Clouds shroud Qin Peak, where is my abode?
Snow is piled on Languan (Blue Pass), and my horse will not push on

Many years later Emperor Xianzong of Tang was offended by Han Yu's criticism of Buddhism. Thus he was demoted from his position in government and banished to Chaozhou. On his way to Chaozhou, Han Yu's journey was blocked due to heavy snowfall on Languan (Blue Pass). At this point he remembered his nephew’s prophecy and cried. Suddenly Han Xiangzi appeared before him, swept away the snow and opened a road for him. Realizing his past mistakes, Han Yu finally converted to Taoism.

== Han Xiangzi and the Dragon Girl (Longnu) ==
The love story between Han Xiangzi and Dragon Girl (Longnu) is a famous folktale in China and has been adapted to many television series as well as opera. It was said that one day Han Xiangzi visited the East Sea and played his flute on the shore. The 7th daughter of the Dragon King was curious to the beautiful melody and emerged from the sea. She transformed herself into a silver eel, then danced in front of the immortal boy. Upon realizing that Han Xiangzi had noticed her, the Dragon Girl transformed herself into her true shape and thus they became lovers.

One day an old woman appeared in front of Han Xiangzi. She informed him that the Dragon King had locked away her daughter at the bottom of the ocean, because he forbade her relationship with Xiangzi. The old lady then took a magical golden bamboo (or Azure Deep Sea jade in another version) from her bag and handed it over to Xiangzi. Actually this was a memento from the Dragon Girl for him. With a broken heart, Han Xiangzi turned the golden bamboo into a magical flute and carried it wherever he went.

The Dragon Girl has appeared in several of the television series depicting the Eight Immortals, such as: Dongyouji-Legend of the Eight Immortals (portrayed by Yvonne Lim), Eight Avatar (portrayed by Jia Qing) and Penglai Baxian (portrayed by Li Qian)

== Modern depictions ==
In the television show Jackie Chan Adventures, Han Xiangzi was shown to be the Immortal who sealed away Hsi Wu, The Sky Demon. Han Xiangzi also appeared in tv series adaption of Eight Immortals:

- Dongyouji (Legend of Eight Immortals), played by Jerry Chang.
- Eight avatar, played by Roger Kwok.
- Penglai Baxian, played by Xu Haiqiao
