= Journey to the North =

1602 Chinese fantasy novel by Yu Xiangdou

Title page of Journey to the North, in an early 20th century edition

Journey to the North (zh:北遊記) is a 1602 Chinese shenmo novel by Yu Xiangdou (Chinese: 余象斗) composed of 24 chapters. The protagonist is the god Zhenwu. The book centers on the re-births of Zhen Wu, who is the Perfected Warrior, who taught the immortal Zhang Sanfeng the art of Taijiquan.

Soon after the publication of Journey to the North, Yu Xiangdou published Journey to the South. Later, these two novels were combined with Wu Yuantai's Journey to the East and Yang Zhihe's abridged Journey to the West to be republished as Four Journeys.

== English translation ==
- Journey to the North: An Ethnohistorical Analysis and Annotated Translation of the Chinese Folk Novel Pei-Yu Chi. Translated by Gary Seaman. University of California Press. 1988.
