= Ten Brothers =

Chinese folktale

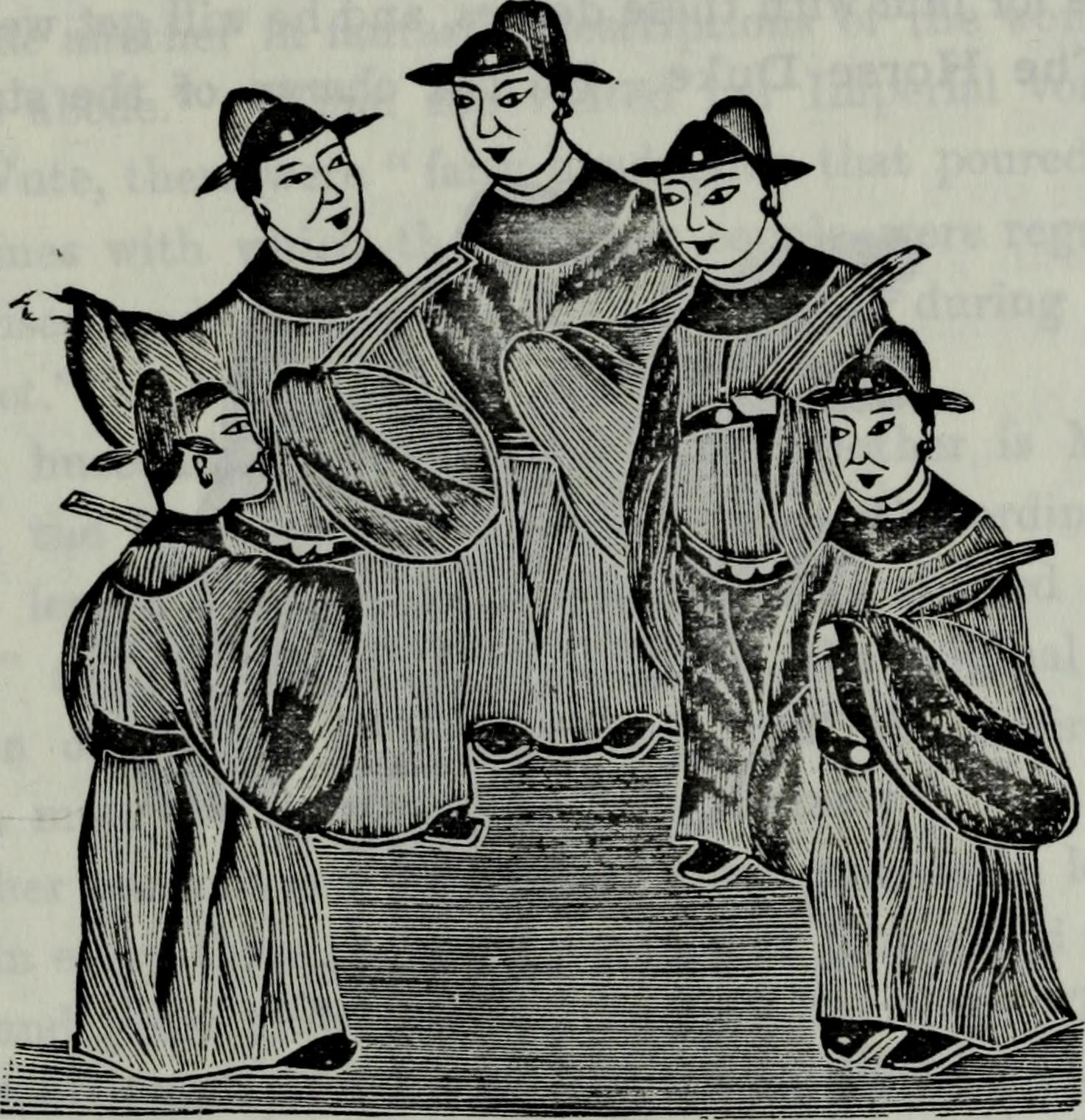

Ten Brothers (Chinese: 十兄弟; pinyin: Shí Xiōngdì) is a Chinese legend known to be written around the time of the Ming Dynasty (1368 to 1644). It has been told and spun off in various adaptations and remains popular since it is one of the oldest Chinese legends to feature characters in a superhero fashion.

== Story ==
The more modern version of the story has a married couple finding ten magical pearls; the wife swallows all ten pearls in one gulp and gives birth to decuplet sons. Each one of the ten brothers possesses a different supernatural power, though they develop their gifts as the story progresses. At the end, the brothers battle some form of an antagonist and they only win by working together.

However, if the ten brothers come into contact with limestone, their powers disappear and they become helpless.

== Characters ==
The number of brothers varies among Chinese ethnicities: the Yi people have nine brothers; the Zhuang people have eight brothers; the Han people have five brothers; and the Li people have 10 brothers.

- 1st and Oldest Brother Ah Dai - Capable of seeing miles away with his binocular eyes, sometimes identified as Mazu's guardian Qianliyan
- 2nd Brother Ah Yi - Capable of hearing miles away, sometimes identified as Mazu's guardian Shunfeng'er
- 3rd Brother Ah Sam - Has Herculean strength.
- 4th Brother Ah See - Has the ability to stretch and is invincible.
- 5th Brother Ah Ng - Capable of flying.
- 6th Brother Ah Luk - Has a solid impenetrable head and is the smartest.
- 7th Brother Ah Chi - Can grow in height.
- 8th Brother Ah Ba - Capable of tunneling underground.
- 9th Brother Ah Kow - Has a huge mouth that can blow wind and shout loudly.
- 10th and Youngest Brother Ah Sup - Can cry a river; also can heal any illnesses if he cries on people.

== Adaptations ==
=== Film ===
The story has been adapted many times in Asian films and TV series, most notably in China and Hong Kong:

- The Liu Brothers, 1953 Soviet cartoon
- Ten Brothers, 1959 Hong Kong black and white film by director Wui Ng
- Ten Brothers vs. the Sea Monster (十兄弟怒海除魔), 1960 film
- Ten Brothers, 1985 series by ATV
- Ten Brothers, 1995 Hong Kong film by director Lee Lik-Chi
- Ten Brothers, 2007 series by TVB

=== Literary ===
- The Five Chinese Brothers, 1938 American book by Claire Huchet Bishop, illustrated by Kurt Wiese
- Seven Chinese Brothers, 1990 children's picture book by Margaret Mahy, illustrated by Jean and Mou-sien Tseng
- The Five Queer Brothers. a transcription of a Chinese version by Western missionary Adele M. Fielde

Music

- 7 Chinese Brothers, song by R.E.M.

== See also ==
- Chinese mythology
- Great Ten
