= Princess Iron Fan =

Character from Journey to the West

- 'Journey to the West; Journey to the South' character
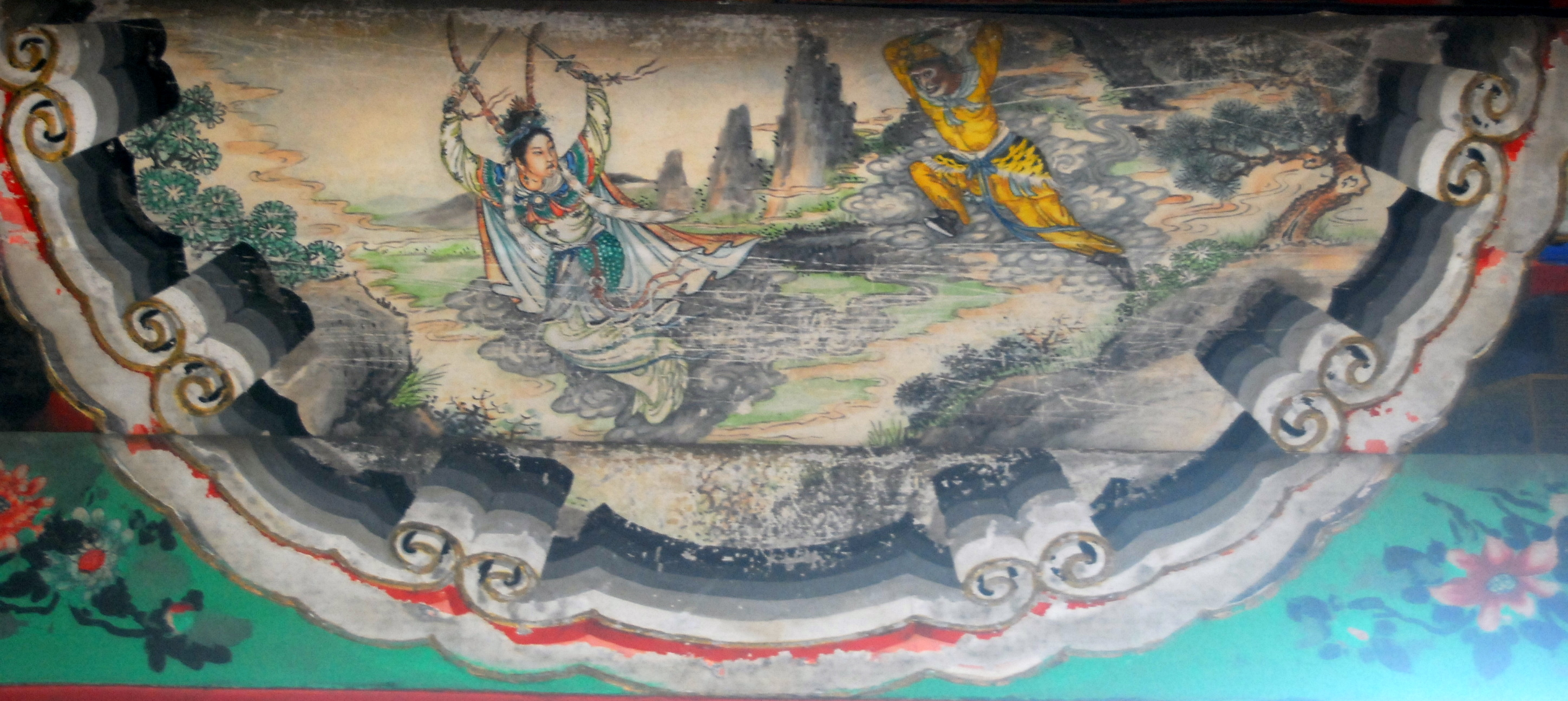
- Princess Iron Fan and Sun Wukong. Painting in the Long Corridor of the Summer Palace in Beijing.
- First appearance: Journey to the West, Chapter 59 (1592)
- Created by: Wu Cheng'en (attributed to JTTW); Yu Xiangdou (JTTS)

In-universe information
- Alias: Rakshasi (羅剎女)
- Species: Rakshasa / Demoness (in JTTW); Goddess (in JTTS)
- Gender: Female
- Title: Princess Iron Fan (鐵扇公主)
- Weapon: Banana Leaf Fan / Plantain Fan (芭蕉扇)
- Family: Goddess Jade Ring (mother) (in JTTS)
- Spouses: Bull Demon King (in JTTW); Emperor Huaguang (in JTTS)
- Children: Red Boy (in JTTW)
- Relatives: Ruyi Jinxian (brother-in-law, in JTTW); Shan Cheng (brother, in JTTS)
- Home: Plantain Cave, Mount Cuiyun (in JTTW)

Princess Iron Fan (traditional Chinese: 鐵扇公主; simplified Chinese: 铁扇公主; pinyin: Tiěshàn Gōngzhǔ; Wade–Giles: T‘ie^{3}-shan^{4} Kung^{1}-chu^{3}; Jyutping: Tit3sin3 Gung1zyu2; Vietnamese Thiết Phiến Công chúa or Bà La Sát) is a character from the 16th century Chinese novel Journey to the West. She is one of the most popular Journey to the West villains, alongside her husband the Bull Demon King, her son Red Boy, and Baigujing.

In Journey to the West, Princess Iron Fan made the villagers living near Flaming Mountains yield to her and offer her tribute like a goddess. She is also addressed as Rākṣasī (羅剎女; Luóchànǚ).

== Legend and literary origins ==
=== Journey to the West ===
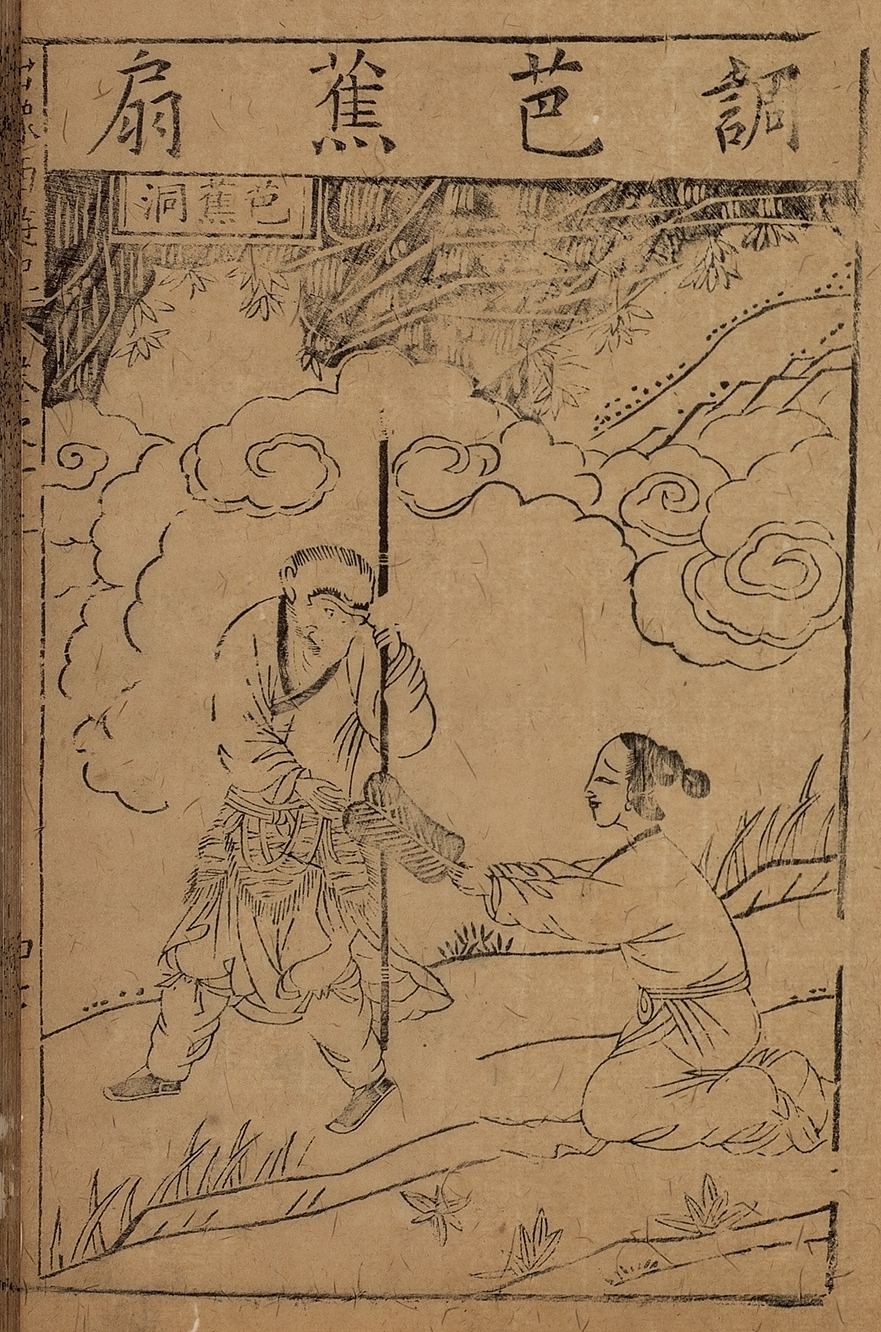
Sun Wukong and Princess Iron Fan, as depicted in the Journey to the West, Shidetang Hall of Jinling edition (1592)

Princess Iron Fan is a beautiful demoness, married to the Bull Demon King and mother to the Red Boy. She was living in "Palmleaf Cave/Grotto" (棕櫚葉洞; Zōnglǘyèdòng), up on "Jade Cloud Mountain" (玉雲山; Yùyúnshān (or "Emerald Cloud Mountain" (翠云山; Cuìyúnshān)), awaiting her husband's return, but was also angry at him for his affair with a fox-spirit woman, Princess Jade Face. The Bull Demon King described his wife as an "immortal female with excellence in spiritual practice (female Xian)" and that she had "practiced self-cultivation since her youth".

She possessed the magical treasure, the Banana Leaf Fan (香蕉叶扇; Xiāngjiāoyèshàn). The fan, made from banana leaves (not dissimilar to the Palm Leaf Fan (芭蕉扇; Bājiāoshàn), one of 5 sacred treasures of Daode Tianzun/Laozi), is extremely large and has magical properties; the novel describes the palm-leaf fan as a spiritual treasure 'begotten' of Heaven and Earth at the back of Mount Kunlun at the time when chaos divided. It is a finest leaf of the "supreme yin", and that is why it can extinguish all fires, including the fires on the Flaming Mountains (the volcano that was created inadvertently by Wukong when he burst out of the aforementioned Laozi's Eight Trigrams Crucible/Brazier 500 years earlier). The palm-leaf fan is also described as being able to create giant whirlwinds; if a man is bodily fanned by it, he will "drift for eighty-four thousand miles before the cold wind subsides", and they're the subject of gravity again. The only known thing immune to the fan's winds is a 'Wind-Arresting elixir' (定风珠 / 定风丹; Dìngfēngzhū / Dìngfēngdān), a bead of which was loaned to Sun Wukong from the Boddhisatva, Lingji, who had originally gotten it from Tathāgata Buddha.

Besides the Banana Leaf Fan, Princess Iron Fan also wields a pair of blue-bladed treasure swords. Princess Iron Fan used this ability to extort favours from the residents near the mountains: by fanning only once each time, the fire would only be extinguished for a year before starting again.

When Sun Wukong and his fellow pilgrims came to the region, they encountered an extremely hostile range of volcanic mountains that they could only pass if the volcanoes became inactive. Sun Wukong wanted to borrow her fan to subdue the Flaming Mountains, but she turned him down as the monkey had been on bad terms with her husband before, which was further soured when Wukong assisted Guanyin in subduing his son Red Boy. Sun Wukong, however, craftily transformed into a fly and flew into her mouth, down her throat, and into her soft belly.

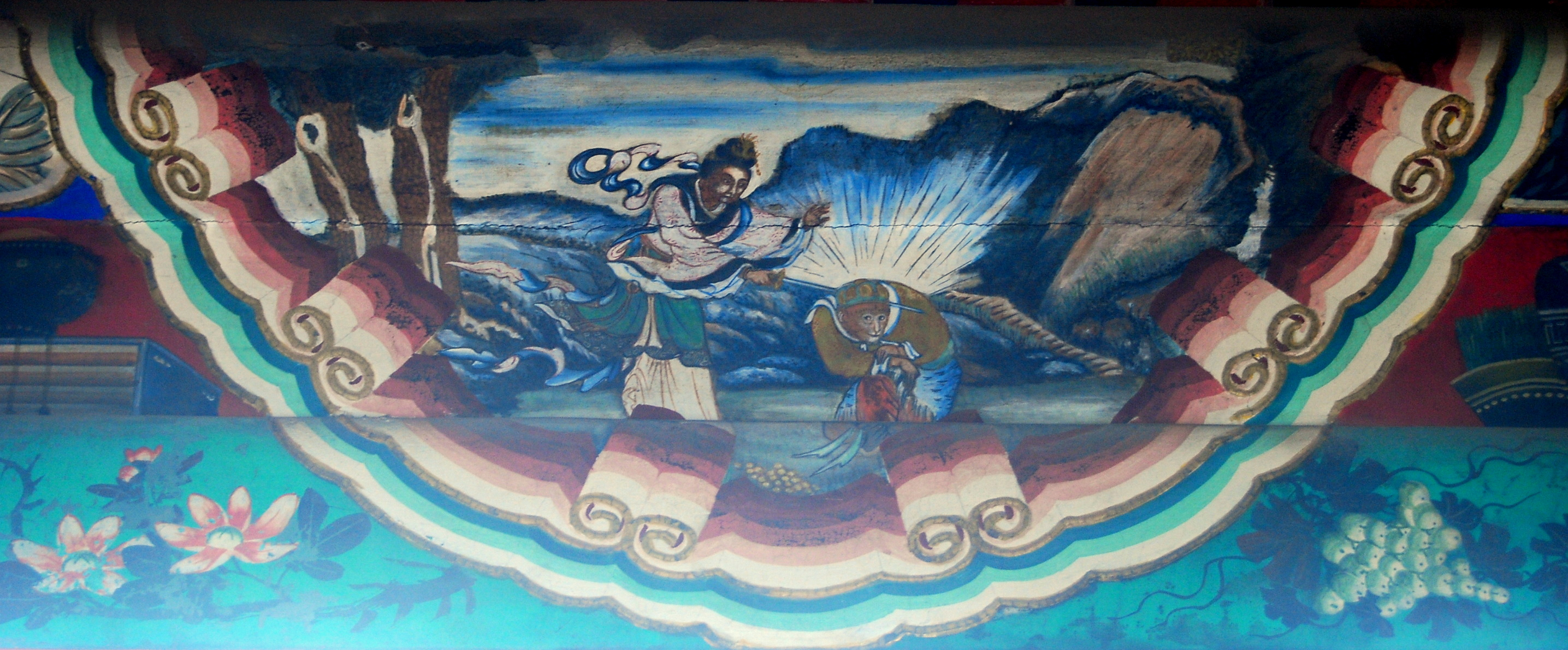
Princess Iron Fan and Sun Wukong. Painted decoration in the Long Corridor at the Summer Palace in Beijing, China

Once inside, Sun Wukong kicked and punched Princess Iron Fan's guts until she was in so much pain that she gave him a fan. However, the fan turned out to be a fake fan which intensified the flames instead of putting them out. Having barely escaped from the fire, Sun Wukong returned, pretending to be her husband through shape shifting and obtained the real fan. Soon afterwards, the real husband came home. Angry at what had happened, he pretended to be Zhu Bajie also through shape shifting and offered to carry the big fan. Lost in the moment of victory, Sun Wukong carelessly believed the Bull King and handed over the fan. Later, the Jade Emperor sent his heavenly troops to help Sun Wukong defeat Bull Demon King and Princess Iron Fan for good, and she was forced to give them the real fan. After using the fan to extinguish the fire on the Flaming Mountain, Sun Wukong forgave the princess and returned the fan to her. The princess continued her spiritual practice, and eventually achieved success.

=== Journey to the South ===
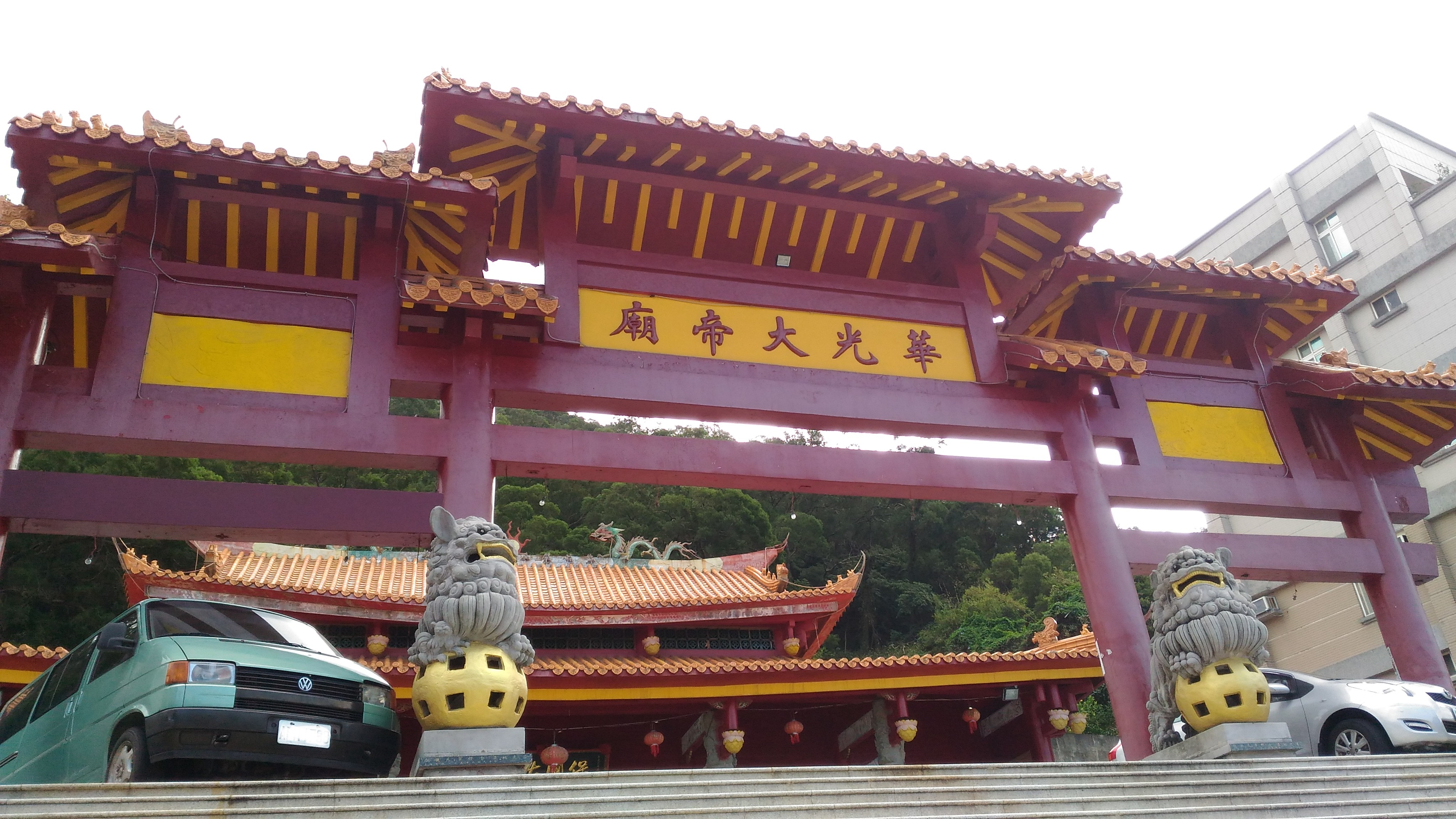
The Huaguang Great Emperor Temple

According to Journey to the South, Princess Iron Fan is depicted as a goddess. She is the daughter of Yuhuan Shengmu and has a younger brother named Shan Cheng. When Huaguang Dadi (the protagonist of Journey to the South) stole the Golden Pagoda from his mother, Princess Iron Fan disguised herself and carried her iron fan, long spear, and sharp knife to seek revenge. In their first battle, the princess defeated Huaguang. Later, Huaguang coincidentally encountered an immortal who revealed his connection with Princess Iron Fan. After obtaining a Wind-Calming Pill from the immortal, Huaguang successfully captured Princess Iron Fan and married her. Due to the story of their marriage, Princess Iron Fan is worshipped alongside Huaguang Dadi in the Huaguang Great Emperor Temple in Fu'ao Village, Nangan Township.

=== In early theatrical adaptations ===
Before her appearance as the wife of the Bull Demon King in the Ming dynasty novel Journey to the West, Princess Iron Fan appeared in Yang Jingxian's Yuan dynasty zaju play Journey to the West. In the play, she identifies herself as an immortal who had served as an ancestor of the Wind Department (风部祖师). She says that she descended to the mortal world after a conflict with the Queen Mother of the West at the Peach Banquet. The conflict is associated with the Five Elements, with the Queen Mother of the West using the power of Metal against Princess Iron Fan's Wood and Wind.

In the play, Princess Iron Fan also identifies Lishan Laomu as her sworn sister and Meng Po as her disciple. She uses an iron fan weighing more than a thousand jin and says that its twenty-four ribs correspond to the twenty-four solar terms. This fan is distinct from the plantain fan (芭蕉扇) that she uses in the later Ming dynasty novel.

== In popular culture ==
The statues of the Princess Iron Fan and Bull Demon King have been established at the Flaming Mountains Scenic Area in Xinjiang and have become a popular tourist destination.

=== Adaptations ===
- The subject of the first Chinese animated feature film is a liberally adapted version of the encounter between Sun Wukong and Princess Iron Fan entitled Princess Iron Fan (1941).
- Princess Iron Fan (1966) by Shaw Brothers Studio
- An adaptation of this occurs in the 24th episode of the Japanese television adaptation Saiyuuki, "The Fires of Jealousy".
- In the adaptation in the 1996 Journey to the West series, the Princess and Bull King have already known Monkey since childhood (they went to the same school that taught Monkey his fighting abilities) and were willing to give him the fan. But their obnoxious son, Red Boy, refuses to let his mother give the fan, thus forcing Monkey to enter her belly to force her to give him the fan.
- The Dragon Ball series Son Goku's wife Chi Chi is based on the character. When she first appeared, her mission alongside Goku was to find the Bansho fan to put out the fire in her father's castle.
- The Sonic the Hedgehog (Archie Comics) series had the Iron Queen, who was wed to the ox-like king Jun Kun and, in her first appearance, set an eternal fire on Mount Stormtop with her magic that could only be put out with the Fan of Fen Xing.
- In Act-Age, competing actresses Kei Yonagi and Chiyoko Momoshiro are both cast to interpret Princess Iron Fan in an original play centered around the character.
- In the film Doraemon: The Record of Nobita's Parallel Visit to the West, she appeared under the name Queen Iron Fan, as the secondary antagonist.
- In the anime Dinosaur King, one of the villains, Sheer, is mistaken briefly for Princess Iron Fan ("lady tessen").
- She appears in the 2020 Lego Monkie Kid animated series as a secondary antagonist alongside the Bull King and Red Boy.
- Poppy Liu plays Princess Iron Fan in the 2023 Disney+ series American Born Chinese.
- It is also the surname of Cong An Hanoi FC (Câu lạc bộ bóng đá Công an Hà Nội).

== See also ==
- List of media adaptations of Journey to the West

== Sources ==
- Yuan, Haiwang (2006). The Magic Lotus Lantern and Other Tales from the Han Chinese. Libraries Unlimited. ISBN 978-1-59158-294-6.
- Werner, Edward Theodore Chalmers (1956). Myths and Legends of China. Library of Alexandria. ISBN 978-1-4655-8092-4.
- Beijing Review. Beijing Review. 1987.
- Che, Muqi (1989). The Silk Road, Past and Present. Foreign Languages Press. ISBN 978-0-8351-2100-2.
