= Bull Demon King =

Character in the novel Journey to the West

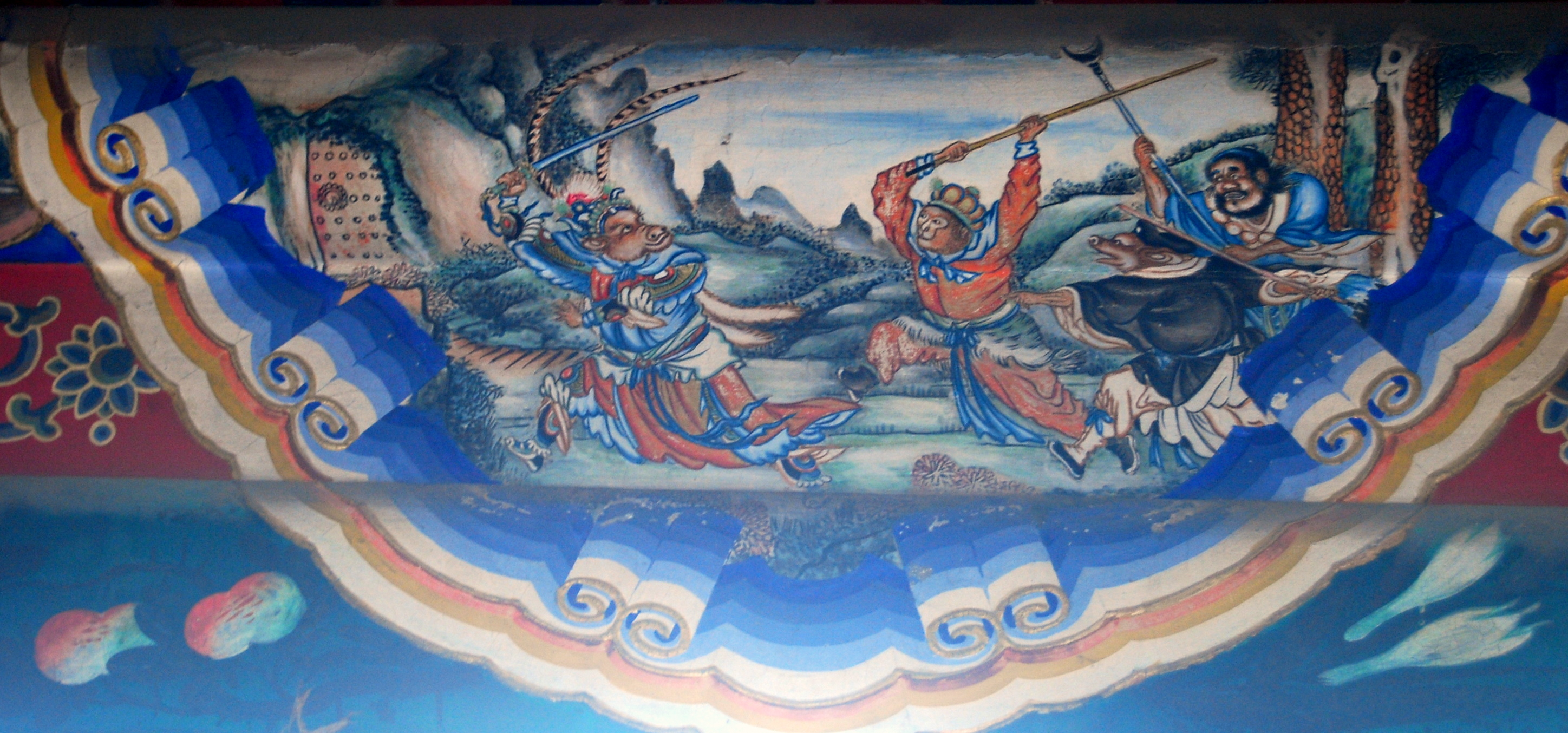
The battle of the Bull King and Sun Wukong. Painting in the Long Corridor of the Summer Palace in Beijing.

Bull Demon King (Chinese: 牛魔王; pinyin: Niú Mówáng), also translated as the Ox King, also-known by his self-proclaimed title the Great Sage Who Pacifies Heaven (Chinese: 平天大聖; pinyin: Píngtiān Dàshèng), and as Dàliwáng (大力王; "King [of] Great Might"/"King Powerful") and as Niú Dàli (牛大力; 'Great Might/Powerful Bull/Ox'), is a character and demon from the 16th century novel Journey to the West.

He is the estranged-husband of the Princess Iron Fan and father of Red Boy. He is a demon king originally-based in the "Palm leaf Cave/Grotto" (棕櫚葉洞; Zōnglǘyèdòng), up on "Jade Cloud Mountain" (玉雲山; Yùyúnshān), with his wife, before betraying his wife for a younger demoness, Princess Jade-Countenance, a female Huli jing, of the "Sky-Scraping Cave" (摩雲洞; Móyún-dòng) on "Accumulated-Thunder Mountain" (积雷山; 積雷山; Jīléi-shān).

Bull King is a major antagonist in the novel Journey to the West by Wu Cheng'en and its many adaptations. He is especially portrayed as the main antagonist in several remakes of Journey to the West, despite his limited appearances in the original novel. He is one of the most popular Journey to the West villains, alongside his wife Princess Iron Fan, his son the Red Boy, the Six-Eared Macaque, and the Baigujing.

He was possibly influenced by Ox-Head, one of the guardians of hell in Chinese mythology.

== In Journey to the West ==
In the early chapters of the novel, he becomes sworn brothers with Sun Wukong and five other demon kings, the Saurian Demon King (蛟魔王; Jiāo Mówáng), the Roc Demon King (鵬魔王; Péng Mówáng), the Lion Spirit King (獅狔王; Shīnǐ Wáng), the Macaque Spirit King (獼猴王; Míhóu Wáng) and the Snub-nosed monkey Spirit King (禺狨王; Yúróng Wáng). He is ranked the most senior of the seven, and styles himself "Great Sage Who Pacifies Heaven" (平天大聖).

He later meets and marries Princess Iron Fan and they have a son, Red Boy. He appears again in a later chapter when the protagonists arrive at the Flaming Mountains along their journey. Sun Wukong disguises himself as Bull Demon King to deceive Princess Iron Fan and takes away her Banana Leaf Fan. The real Bull Demon King visits Princess Iron Fan, who then realises she has been tricked. Bull Demon King disguises himself as Zhu Bajie to trick Sun Wukong and retrieve the fan.

In the ensuing fight against Sun Wukong and Zhu Bajie, Bull Demon King reveals his true form, a giant white bull, and attempts to charge towards his opponents. Heavenly forces, including Devaraja Li, his third son, Prince Nezha and the Four Heavenly Kings all show up, with orders from the Buddha and the Jade Emperor to capture the Bull Demon King. When Prince Nezha fails to vanquish Bull Demon King after repeatedly beheading him (as the Bull Demon King also knew the arts of the 72 Transformations; 七十二變化 / 地煞 / 地煞數; Qīshí'Èr Bianhua, lit. "72 Terrestrial Killers"), he attaches one of his flaming wheels to the Bull Demon King's horns--burning him and causing him great pain--whilst Devaraja Li uses an "imp-reflecting mirror" (照妖镜; Zhàoyāojìng) to prevent the Bull Demon King from shapeshifting and escaping. After the Bull Demon King is captured, he pleads for his life and finally with her wife gives the fan back to Sun Wukong , who fans the mountain 49 times and permanently extinguishes the flames. Then he gives the fan back to the two, who go into the mountains to practice self-cultivation as a recluse.

=== Jade-Faced Princess ===
The Jade-Faced Princess (玉面公主; Yùmiàn Gōngzhǔ) or Princess Jade-Countenance is a female, white-faced Huli jing (a vixen), described as 'lissome' (and compared to legendary court-beauty, Wang Qiang), of the "Sky-Scraping Cave" (摩雲洞; Móyún-dòng) on "Accumulated-Thunder Mountain"/"Hoard-Thunder Mountain" (積雷山; Jīléi-shān). Her late father, a 'fox king of ten thousand years', was the previous master of "Sky-Scraping Cave/Grotto" and "Accumulated-Thunder Mountain" (described as a 'very fine mountain'); when he passed away with no son, he left everything his cave/grotto, mountain, and a vast fortune to his only child, Princess Jade-Countenance. Desirous of a powerful protector, Princess Jade-Countenance, 2 years prior to her appearance in Journey to the West, after having learned of King Powerful's (the Bull Demon King's) reputation for enormous magic powers, used her equally enormous inheritance as a dowry to lure him away from his first wife, Princess Iron Fan/Rākṣasī, becoming his second wife/concubine, and he (to her mind) her consort over her late father's domain.

She proves to be a female who is highly jealous of her husband's ex-wife and the fact that he continued to acknowledge and pay maintenance to his ex-wife (in jewels, precious stones, bolts of silk and satin, firewood, and rice). She also proves cowardly, as she is easily scared by Sun Wukong's appearance (when he angrily calls her a hypocrite) and by the fact that her sole reason for luring King Powerful/Bull Demon King away from Princess Iron Fan in the first place was out of desire for a powerful protector. When Sun Wukong's and Zhu Bajie's fight with her husband reached her mountain a day and a night after first meeting Wukong, Princess Jade-Countenance, scared again, sent out the mountain's entire army to aid the Bull Demon King. Later, when Sun Wukong and Zhu Bajie break into the Sky-Scraping Cave/Grotto and overwhelm the household, her husband, the Bull Demon King, abandons her and their entire household to their fates by transforming into a swan and taking to the air. Her fate is later revealed by Zhu Bajie, who killed her after Sun Wukong first gave chase after the fleeing Bull Demon King with one swing of his rake before burning out the Sky-Scraping Cave/Grotto.

== Cultural site ==
In modern times, the character is frequently adapted for cultural tourism. For example, scenic areas such as the Shengtan Grand Canyon in Yongji, Shanxi, have been rebranded as "Bull Demon King Valley".

In China, historical "Ox King Temples" (牛王庙, Niu Wang Miao) are occasionally mistaken by modern tourists for shrines dedicated to the Bull Demon King due to the similarity in name. However, these temples were traditionally built to worship agricultural deities—often associated with Ran Geng, a disciple of Confucius—who protected plowing oxen from disease, and have no connection to the novel.

In the Qinling Mountains, a complex of three natural caverns is locally identified as the "Bull Demon King Cave." According to regional folklore, these caves served as the residence for the Bull Demon King and Princess Iron Fan.

In the Zhangye region of Gansu Province, the red sandstone landscapes of the Heli Mountains (合黎山) are frequently associated with the character's domain. A natural cavern known as the "Bull Demon King Cave" (牛魔王洞) serves as a central landmark for local folklore in Linze County, which includes specific regional tales such as the "Marriage of the Demon King." Similar sites are integrated into regional tourism initiatives in the nearby Pingshanhu Grand Canyon, where the canyon's rugged geological formations are used to evoke the fictional settings of the novel.

In Meishan, Sichuan Province, the Bull Demon King Cave is locally identified as a residence for the character's son, Red Boy. The interior of the cavern features a statue of a white bull, representing the character's true form—the "White Bull of the Snow Mountains"—as described in Chapter 61 of the novel.

The statues of the Bull Demon King and Princess Iron Fan have been established at the Flaming Mountains Scenic Area in Xinjiang and have become a popular tourist destination. A statue of the Bull Demon King has been erected at Baima Mountain in Chongqing.

== Analysis ==
Associate Professor Zhao Xu of Shenyang University identifies the Bull Demon King as a symbolic counterpart to Sun Wukong, citing the line from Chapter 61: "The Bull King was originally a transformation of the Mind Monkey" (牛王本是心猿变). Zhao argues that while the two share similar temperaments and origins, their differing abilities to "control the mind" (摄心) result in their contrasting fates. In this analysis, the Bull Demon King is framed as an "alternative demon" (另类妖魔) whose characterization provides a philosophical foil to Sun Wukong's own development.

Professor Cheng Yunlei of Nantong University characterizes the Bull Demon King's domestic relationships as being defined by a sense of stability and mutual consideration. Cheng notes that the character justifies his relationship with the Jade-Faced Princess to Princess Iron Fan as a means of "managing external property" (图治外产) to improve the family's financial standing. Furthermore, his behavior toward the Jade-Faced Fox is described as providing a "steady and mature" sense of security through frequent consolation and patience. According to this analysis, the character maintains genuine, reciprocal affection with both spouses, distinguishing him from other demonic figures in the novel.

Qing dynasty Taoist adept Liu Yiming provides an allegorical interpretation of the Bull Demon King centered on the concept of "following desires" (shun, 顺). Analyzing the sequence where the Bull King loses the Water-Crystal Golden-Eyed Beast to Sun Wukong, Liu argues that the narrative serves to distinguish between "correct" and "incorrect" ways of following one's inclinations. He posits that following one's nature with disciplined intent leads to sagehood, while doing so without restraint leads to the "demonic." In this view, the Bull Demon King represents the risk of losing "truth" to "falsehood" for those who lack a profound understanding of Yin and yang and spiritual cultivation.

== Adaptations ==
- Bowser, the main antagonist of the Mario video game franchise, was inspired by the Ox-King. Nintendo designer Shigeru Miyamoto has stated that he first envisioned Bowser as an ox, basing him on the Ox-King from the 1960 anime film Alakazam the Great.
- In the adaptation in the 1996 Journey to the West series, the Bull King and the Princess Iron Fan have already known Monkey since childhood (they went to the same school that taught Monkey his fighting abilities) and were willing to give him the fan. But their obnoxious son, Red Boy, refuses to let his mother give the fan, thus forcing Monkey to enter her belly to force her to give him the fan.
- In the 1988 film Doraemon: The Record of Nobita's Parallel Visit to the West as the main antagonist. In the film, he becomes ruler of Japan after Doraemon and Nobita accidentally release monsters from a 22nd-century game based on Journey to the West. As a result, the protagonist's loved ones are also converted into demons. In order to save Japan, they travel in time to prevent this from happening.
- In the 2014 film The Monkey King, the Bull Demon King (Aaron Kwok) is waging war on Heaven. Much of Heaven is destroyed during the battle, and the Bull Demon King faces off against the Jade Emperor (Chow Yun-fat), the ruler of Heaven. The Bull Demon King is defeated but before the Jade Emperor can kill the Bull Demon King.
- In the LEGO theme Monkie Kid, which is based on Journey to the West, the Demon Bull King is the main antagonist, seeking to take over a modernized world alongside his wife and son. In the animated series based on the theme, he is voiced by Steven Blum.
- In the Dragon Ball franchise, the Bull Demon King is referred to as the Ox King, is a human with incredible physical attributes, and is the father of the Iron Fan Princess instead of her husband, who is known as Chi-Chi.
- In the 2017 film Journey to the West: Bull Demon King (西游之牛魔王), Bull Demon King was portrayed as the main protagonist.
- Portrayed by Louis Fan in the 2023 film Niu Mo Wang (牛魔王之魔王再临), as the main protagonist.
- Portrayed by Leonard Wu in the 2023 American television series American Born Chinese.
- The Bull Demon King appears in Black Myth: Wukong.
- The Bull Demon King appears as a playable character in the app version of Kemono Friends 3.

== See also ==
- List of media adaptations of Journey to the West
- Ravana
