= The Story of Han Xiangzi =

Chinese Daoist novel

A page from a critical commentary edition, from the Harvard University

The Story of Han Xiangzi (韓湘子全傳) is a 17th-century Chinese novel written by Yang Erzeng (楊爾曾). It is written in vernacular Chinese. The protagonist is Han Xiangzi, one of the Eight Immortals. The novel was written with a clear Daoist message.

The novel has been translated in full to English by Philip Clart.
