= Yu Xiangdou =

Chinese writer and publisher (c. 1560–c. 1637)

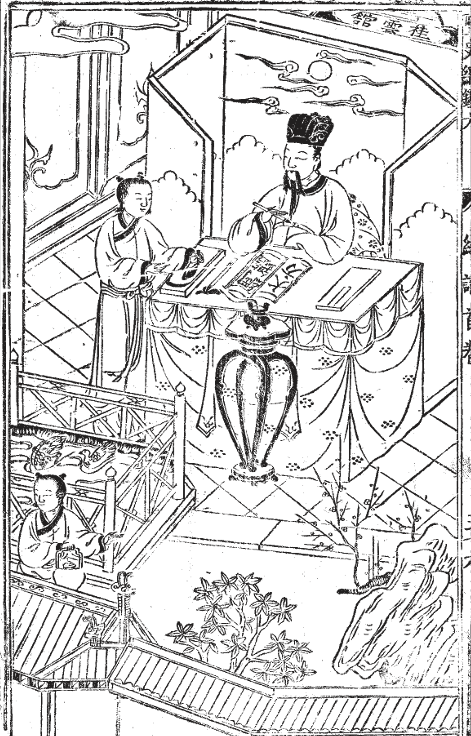
Portrait of Yu in the New Edition of the Classic Annals and Histories edited by Grand Scribe Li Tingji (新刊九我李太史編纂古本歷史大方綱鑒 Xinkan Jiuwo Li Taishi bianzuan Guben lishi dafang gangjian); 1600.

Yu Xiangdou (Note: Yu had several courtesy names, including Yangzhi (仰止), Wentai (文台), Junzhao (君召), Shiteng (世騰), Xiangwu (象烏), and Yuansu (元素). He sometimes used the pen name Santai shanren (三台山人) or The Recluse of the Triple-Terraced House.) (Chinese: 余象斗; pinyin: Yú Xiàngdòu; c. 1560 – c. 1637) was a Chinese writer, editor, and publisher active during the late Ming dynasty. He took over the leadership of his family's printing conglomerate in Jianyang, Fujian after repeatedly failing the imperial examination, and was known for including portraits of himself in his publications.

== Career ==
Yu's family had been in the publishing industry since as early as the twelfth century. At the time of Yu's birth around 1560, his family owned the largest printing conglomerate in Jianyang, Fujian, which comprised some thirty independent publishing houses. In 1591, after failing the imperial examination multiple times, Yu began running the family business.

Yu edited and published at least seventy titles, including the Four Books and Five Classics, two collections of fictional Taoist writing, three collections of gong'an (court-case) stories, and two or three editions of Romance of the Three Kingdoms. By his own account, Yu also published "a treatise on poetry, at least two household encyclopedias, and several works on divination."

Yu is credited with authoring two shenmo novels—The Heavenly King Huaguang's Journey to the South (華光天王南遊志傳, Huaguang Tianwang Nanyou zhizhuan) and The Full Story of the Journey to the North and the Origin of Xuandi (全像北游記玄帝出身傳, Quanxiang Beiyou ji Xuandi chushen zhuan). These two novels, alongside The Source of the Eight Immortals' Journey to the East (八仙出處東遊記, Baxian chuchu dongyou ji) by Wu Yuantai (吴元泰) and the Journey to the West (西遊記傳, Xiyouji zhuan) by Yang Zhihe, make up the later Qing dynasty collection titled Four Journeys (四遊記). (Note: The four works are better known as Journey to the South, Journey to the North, Journey to the East, and Journey to the West respectively.)

Yu occasionally passed off his own writing as part of the older novels that he republished. For instance, his additions to his 1594 edition of Water Margin were derided as "the hasty, slipshod writing of a relatively illiterate bookseller" by one reviewer. On the other hand, Yu claimed that his republications were superior to those of other printing houses because of their unique illustrations. In the preface of the same 1594 edition of Water Margin, Yu writes,

"There are many editions of Water Margin published by commercial publishers. There are dozens of them that are illustrated. But only my edition has illustrations of all the scenes ... Scholars who purchase this edition should keep (one of Yu's printing houses) Shuangfeng tang (雙峰堂) in mind."

In addition, Yu enjoyed including illustrations of himself in his publications. While many authors at the time were known to include their portraits in their books, it was "extremely rare" for commercial publishers to follow suit. One of the earliest surviving portraits of Yu—depicting him in front of one of his printing houses, Santai guan (三台館) or Triple-Terraced House—can be found on the cover page of his 1598 anthology of vernacular love stories, titled Numerous Splendid Love Stories, newly carved and freshly collected at the studio (新刻芸窓彙爽萬錦情林, Xinke Xinke yunchuang huishuang Wanjin qinglin).
