= Four Journeys =

Chinese fantasy novels

Left: cover of the Four Journeys, a printed collection that encompasses all four novels.
Center: cover of the novel Journey to the South.
Right: cover of novel Journey to the East.

The Four Journeys (Chinese: 四遊記; pinyin: Sì Yóujì) is a collection of four shenmo novels that were published during the Ming dynasty Wanli era, and they consist of Journey to the North, Journey to the South, Journey to the East, and Journey to the West.

- Journey to the North (北遊記) was composed by Yu Xiangdou.
- Journey to the South (南遊記) was composed by Yu Xiangdou.
- Journey to the East (東遊記) was composed by Wu Yuan-tai (吳元泰, fl. 1522–1526).
- Journey to the West (西遊記), a shortened and re-narrated version of Wu Cheng'en's Journey to the West, composed by Yang Zhihe (楊致和).

== Bibliography ==
- Gary Seaman (tr.): Journey to the North. University of California Press, 1987.
- List of personages in the Journey to the North
- "Divine Authorship of the Journey to the North".
