= Red Boy =

Journey to the West character

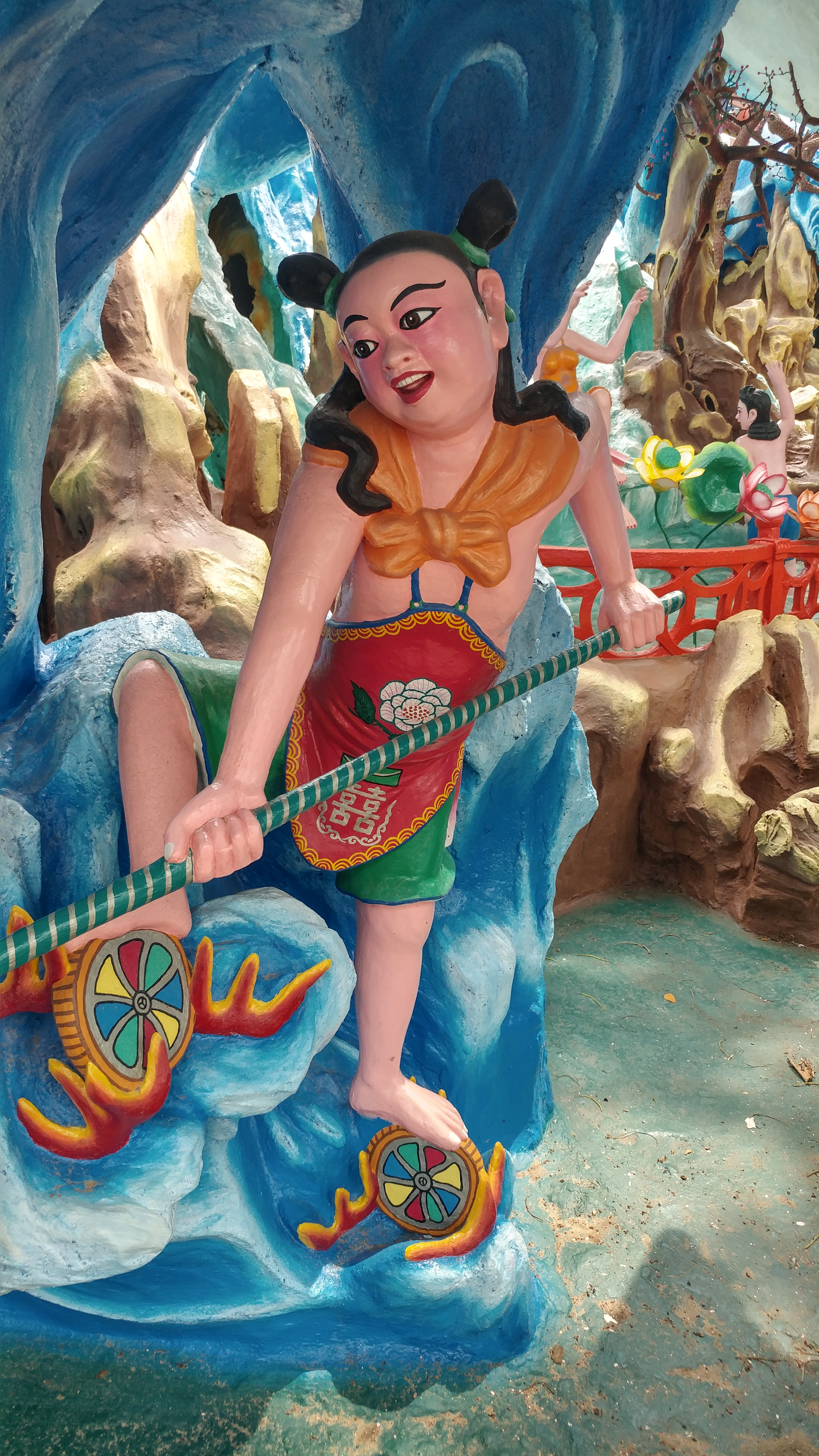
Statue of Red Boy wrongly depicted with a fire wheel under each of his soles similar to Nezha

Red Boy (traditional Chinese: 紅孩兒; simplified Chinese: 红孩儿; pinyin: Hóng Hái-er; Wade–Giles: Hung^{2} Hai^{2}-êrh; Jyutping: Hung4 Haai4ji4; Vietnamese: Hồng Hài Nhi, Japanese: Kōgaiji) is a character featured in the 16th-century novel Journey to the West. Red Boy was also known as the Boy Sage Great King (聖嬰大王; Shèngyīng Dàwáng) and "Bull Boy Sage" (牛聖嬰; Niú Shèngyīng). Through this, Red Boy had developed True Samādhi Fire (三昧真火; Sānmèi-zhēnhuǒ), which enables him to shoot fire inextinguishable by water and smoke from his eyes, nostrils, and mouth. Samādhi is the Sanskrit word for concentration. His classical appearance is Sudhana, also known as Shancai.

== Life as Red Boy in Journey to the West ==
Red Boy (紅孩兒) is the ferocious son of the Bull Demon King and Princess Iron Fan (a Rakshasa). Upon hearing about Tang Sanzang's arrival at his mountain, he attempted to capture the monk so he and his father could eat the latter's flesh and extend their lifespans. Although a young child, he is fiercely independent and assigned to a land away from his parents, even reigning over lesser demons and local deities with his mighty power.

Red Boy first meets Sun Wukong, Tang Sanzang, Zhu Bajie, and Sha Wujing as a red cloud emerging from Mount Hao, which alerts them to his presence. He then turned into a ball of fire and disappeared. Red Boy tries to lure the travelers by disguising himself as an innocent boy tied to a tree; they kindly untie him, and Sun Wukong (who knows that he's a demon) has to carry him along the way until he prepares to kill him afterward. But Red Boy escaped his spirit out of his body just in time as Wukong violently destroyed it. Enraged that Wukong tried to kill him, Red Boy conjures a powerful whirlwind around him and kidnaps Tang Sanzang in the chaos.

Red Boy brought him to his Fire-Wind Cave near the Withered Pine Ravine in Mount Hao. He prepared to cook Tang Sanzang but was alerted by the lesser demons that Sun Wukong and Zhu Bajie were demanding his master back outside the cave. Red Boy ordered the lesser demons to push five carts outside the cave in the order of the Five Elements.

He did not believe Wukong's statement that his father (the Bull Demon King) was Sun Wukong's sworn brother, which technically made Wukong a relative of his.

Red Boy and Wukong fought for 20 rounds. When Zhu Bajie joined the fight, Red Boy stood in the middle of one of the five carts and punched himself twice in the nose. He said a spell and breathed out fire with smoke from his nostrils. Fire blew out of the five carts and spread everywhere, blotting the skies.

Wukong cast a fire resistance spell and chased after Red Boy but could not find him in the flames, so he jumped out of the fire. Red Boy, who had returned to his cave, thought he had defeated Wukong.

Sun Wukong at first asks for some rain from the Eastern Dragon King to counter Red Boy's Samadhi Fire, to no avail (the Dragon King's rain can only extinguish normal fires, but Red Boy's fire is inextinguishable from normal efforts to quench fire), with the rain in fact intensifying the flames. Caught directly by the flames, Sun Wukong is ultimately almost burned to death, and he finally resorts to asking for the help of the Guanyin.

Zhu Bajie volunteered to ask for her help as Wukong was still recovering. But Red Boy was spying on him and deduced he was going to look for Guanyin for reinforcements. He transformed into her shape and form and tricked Bajie into following him back to his cave, where the lesser demons captured him into Red Boy's As-you-will leather bag and hung him up the rafters.

When Wukong noticed that Bajie was taking too long, he lured the lesser demons out of the cave. When they chased him with spears, he discreetly transformed into a clothes bundle, which they took back to the cave. That's when he learned that Red Boy sent out his six little devils, who are his warriors (Mist-in-the-Clouds, Clouds-in-the-Mist, Firefast, Windspeed, Hurley-Burley, and Burley-Hurley) to invite his father, the Bull Demon King, to the cave and share Tang Sanzang as a meal.

Wukong flew out of the cave as a fly and transformed himself into the Bull Demon King from a distance. He used his hairs to change them into dogs, bows, crossbows, and falcons so that it may look like he was coincidentally nearby through a hunting party when the six warriors met him.

The six warriors lead him back to Red Boy, who is elated but suspicious when his "father" refuses to eat Tang Sanzang. He asked Wukong, transformed into the Bull Demon King, when his son's birthday is. When Wukong feigned forgetfulness, Red Boy signaled all the demons to attack, claiming that his father "is always reeling off the details of his birth time."

Wukong escaped, but not before teasing Red Boy for attacking his "father". Feeling elated at having tricked Red Boy, he went to ask Boddhisatva Guanyin for help.

Guanyin listened to Wukong's tale. Upon hearing that Red Boy tricked another by transforming into her, she furiously flung a vase into the sea. A tortoise returned it, the vase now full of the water equivalent of the sea. Because Wukong cannot carry it, Guanyin came with him.

When Wukong returned with Guanyin, she ordered all the mountain gods and local deities to get all the living things on the top of the mountain. Then she vanquished the still-burning Samadhi fire with the sea-full of water in her vase of purity. She put a Confusion spell on Wukong's palm and ordered him to lure Red Boy out.

Wukong tried to challenge and mock Red Boy out of the cave. When Red Boy continued to ignore him, Wukong bashed through the outer doors. Red Boy confronted him. Upon Wukong provoking him, Red Boy charged. Wukong released the Confusion spell inside his fist on him. Confused, Red Boy chased him away from the cave, and Wukong hid himself in Guanyin's divine radiance. Red Boy then confronted Guanyin, who ignored his demands. He tried to pierce her with his spear, but she and Wukong disappeared in a beam of golden light. They appeared in the highest heavens and watched Red Boy find Guanyin's (empty) lotus throne.

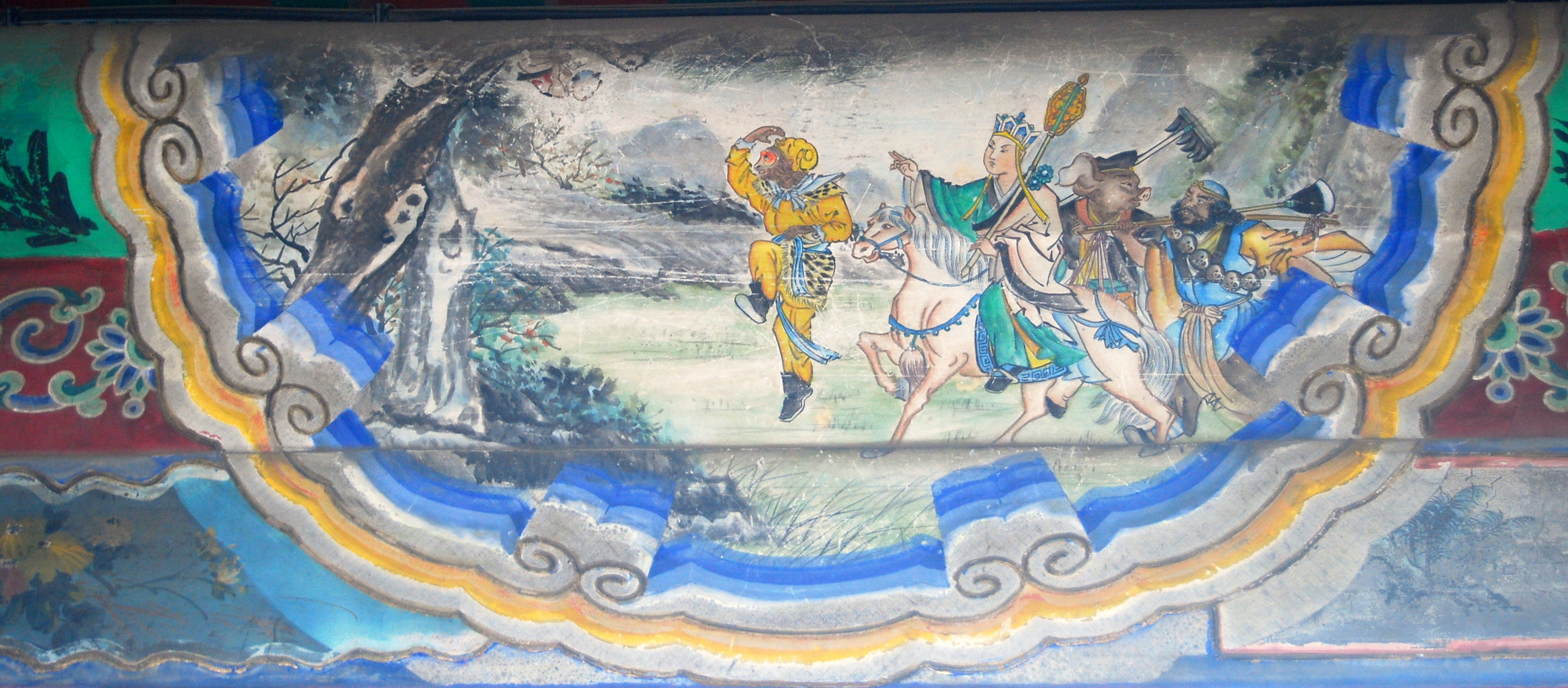
Mural in the Long Corridor, Summer Palace, Beijing, depicting a scene from Journey to the West.

Red Boy, in irreverence, sat in it, imitating Guanyin's posture. Suddenly the lotus throne transformed into thirty-six pole-star swords (that she borrowed from Heavenly King Li), which pierced and wounded Red Boy; as he attempted to take them out, the swords then transformed into halberds, which trapped him. In pain, Red Boy then pleaded for Guanyin to release him. In return, Guanyin told him to accept her rules of conduct. He agreed. She then shaved Red Boy's head into a Mount Tai tonsure. She then named him Shancai (善財; 'Great Wealth') or Shancai Tongzi (善財童子; 'Great Wealth Dragon Boy') and asked if he would accept. He agreed.

She then withdrew the blades and healed Red Boy's wounds, but Red Boy attempted to attack the Bodhisattva again. Wukong tried to protect her, but she threw a golden band that multiplied into five and fixed around Red Boy's head, wrists, and legs (which was similar to the magical band around Wukong's head, in that it also tightened after Guanyin recited the mantra "oṃ maṇipadme hūṃ", causing pain to Red Boy), thereby subduing him.

Red Boy then found out that he could not remove these bands. They are described as being so painfully tight and rooted to his flesh that the more he rubbed them, the more they hurt. After being jibed by Wukong, he took his spear again and attempted to attack him, only to have Guanyin recite yet another mantra, which made Red Boy put his hands together in front of his chest, unable to pull them apart; Red Boy, now with his arms immobilized, could do nothing other than lower his head in a bow of defeat. Guanyin then became his 53rd religious teacher.

The subduing of Red Boy greatly soured the relationship between Wukong and Princess Iron Fan, which created issues when Wukong needed to borrow the Banana Leaf Fan to traverse a flaming mountain.

== Life as Shancai in Journey to the West ==
Red Boy, now Shancai, became a student of the Guanyin. He resides with her, Moksa, the Naga Maiden, the twenty-four devas, and her attendants in Mount Putuo. He became amiable with Sun Wukong when Wukong went to Mount Putuo again to seek Guanyin's help.

== Tales of the Southern Seas ==
Sudhana as a disciple of Guanyin, helped in rescuing the East Sea Dragon King's third son from the fisherman when dragon king prayed to Guanyin for help.

== Worship ==
In certain regional folk religions, Red Boy is venerated as a deity. A cavern in Meishan, Sichuan Province, houses a statue of Red Boy that serves as an object of local worship. The iconography of the statue depicts the character with a fire-tipped spear and a red cloak, attributes from the novel.

== In popular culture ==
The 2021 film The Journey to the West: Demon's Child features Red Boy as the main character. It depicts his life and relationship with Sun Wukong.

In the 2024 Action RPG Black Myth: Wukong, Red Boy's backstory is significantly altered. Here, he was born to Princess Iron Fan after she was impregnated from being forced to drink from the child-bearing river of the Kingdom of Women, and displays the traits of a Yaksha, later becoming the Yaksha King after absorbing one of Wukong's relics. He is bested in battle by the Destined One, the protagonist of the story, and takes his own life in stubborn defiance of the Celestial Court.
