= Huaguang Dadi =

Chinese deity

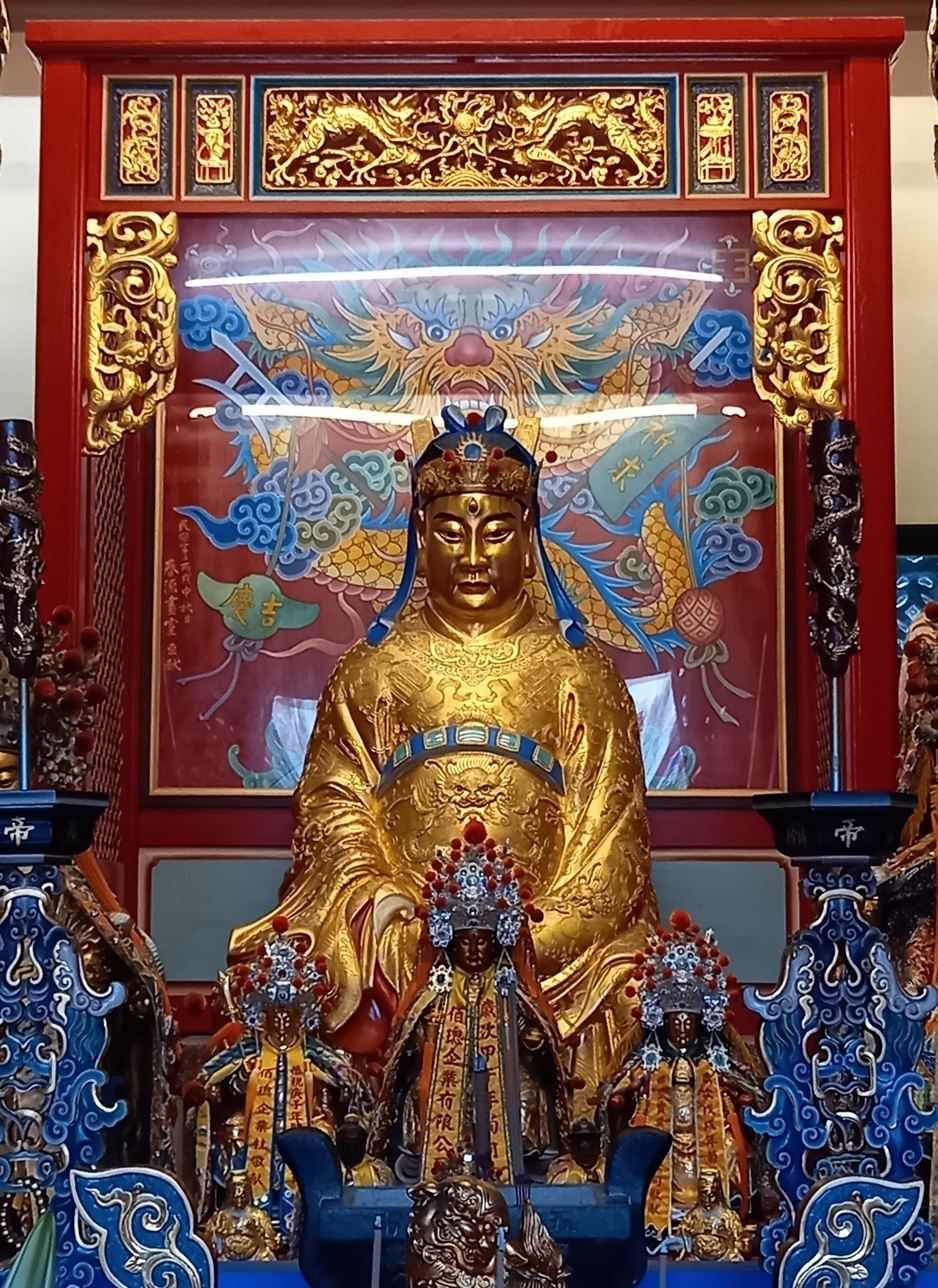
Five Emperors Temple, Bajijing, Tainan

Emperor Huaguang (simplified Chinese: 华光大帝; traditional Chinese: 華光大帝; pinyin: Huáguāng Dàdì), also known as Marshal Ma (馬靈官) or Wu Xian (五显), is a deity of fire and protection in Chinese folk religion. He is also one of the Four Guardian Marshals in Taoism.

== Iconography ==
Huaguang is a fire deity with supernatural powers. In the Sanjiao Soushen Daquan (三教搜神大全), he is described as a powerful god. He is often shown with three eyes, giving rise to the saying "Marshal Ma has three eyes" (马王爷三只眼). He usually wears armor and carries magical weapons, including a golden brick (金砖). Some local traditions give him other forms and powers.

== Origins ==
The worship of Wu Xian (五显) began in Jiangxi, especially in Wuyuan County, and grew during the Song dynasty. Early traditions worshipped five gods or spirits. Later, Huaguang became part of this worship but originally was a separate deity. The gods also received official titles containing the word Xian (显).

During the Ming dynasty, the worship of Huaguang and Wu Xian spread to Jiangnan, Fujian, and Guangdong. Temples were built for them in these regions. In some Hakka and southern Chinese communities, Huaguang's birthday falls on the 28th day of the ninth lunar month. Some merchants in Yongding, Fujian, also worship him as a god of wealth.

== In Buddhism ==
The Song dynasty text Xianchuang Kuoyi Zhi (閒窗括異志) by Lu Yinglong identifies Wuxian Lingguan Dadi (五显灵官大帝) with Huaguang Rulai (华光如来). However, scholar Chow Shu-kai notes that Huaguang Rulai is traditionally another name for Śāriputra, a disciple of the Buddha. He regards the identification with Huaguang Dadi as a later folk belief.

Huaguang is also worshipped as a Buddhist temple guardian (伽藍神). A statue of him is kept at Manpuku-ji (萬福寺), the main temple of the Ōbaku Zen school in Japan.

In Chapter 96 of Journey to the West, Tang Sanzang says that Huaguang Bodhisattva was a disciple of Flame Five-Light Buddha (火焰五光佛). After defeating the Poisonous-Fire Ghost King (毒火鬼王), he was punished and became Wuxian Lingguan.

== Patron deity of Cantonese opera ==
In Guangdong and Hong Kong, Cantonese opera performers worship Huaguang as their patron god. According to one legend, the Jade Emperor ordered Huaguang to destroy theaters because of the behavior of opera performers. Huaguang protected the performers instead, and they later began worshipping him. Opera performers call him "Master Huaguang" (华光师傅). Some opera groups and temples have shrines for him.

== In Journey to the South ==
Huaguang is the main character in the Ming dynasty novel Journey to the South (南遊記). He is first a fire spirit named Miaojixiang (妙吉祥). He studies under Tathāgata Buddha and gains magical powers. After killing Duhuo Gui at a Buddhist gathering, he angers the Buddha. He is later reborn as Ma Lingguan (馬靈官), the son of the god of Mount Ma'er. He is born with three eyes and is also called Sanyan Lingguan (三眼靈官).

Ma Lingguan later dies while trying to take Ziwei Dadi's golden lance. Miaole Tianzun (妙樂天尊) then arranges for him to be reborn as the son of Douniugong Tianwang. He continues his training and gains magical weapons, including the Three-Cornered Golden Brick. The Jade Emperor makes him a marshal of the Ministry of Fire. However, Huaguang causes trouble in Heaven and burns the Southern Heavenly Gate. Xuantian Shangdi eventually stops his rebellion.

Huaguang is later reborn as the son of Madam Xiao. When his mother is sent to Hell, he travels to the underworld to rescue her. He meets several supernatural beings, including Nezha. During his journey, he loses his golden brick and receives a Golden Pagoda from Yuhuan Shengmu (玉環聖母). He also defeats Princess Iron Fan and marries her.

At the end of the novel, Huaguang rescues his mother and obtains the Queen Mother of the West's Peaches of Immortality to restore her health. The Jade Emperor forgives him and gives him back his position as a heavenly marshal.
