= Temple blocks =

Percussion instrument

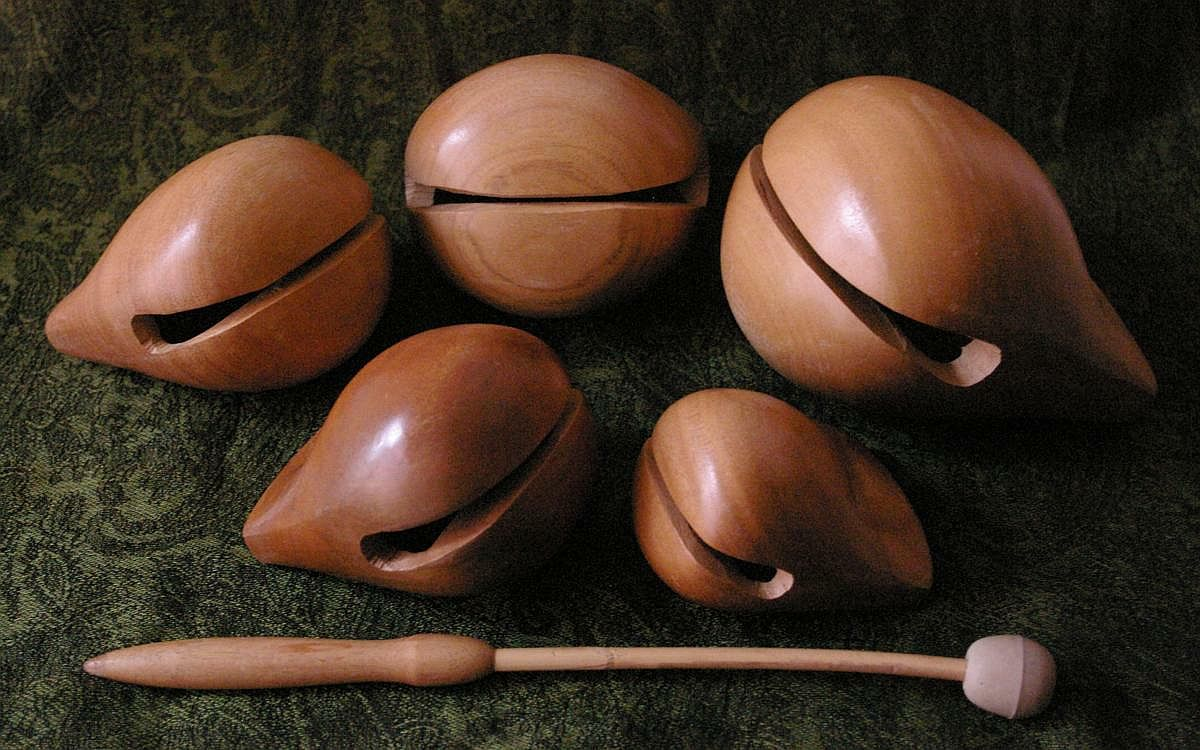

Percussion instrument
- Other names: Tone blocks; skulls; wooden bells; dragons' mouths
- Classification: Percussion
- Hornbostel–Sachs classification: 111.242.221 (Sets of hanging bells without internal strikers)

Related instruments
- Woodblock; wooden fish; slit drum

Builders
- Latin Percussion; Pearl; Meinl

Temple blocks are a type of percussion instrument consisting of a set of woodblocks. It is descended from the muyu or wooden bell, an instrument originating from eastern Asia, where it is commonly used in religious ceremonies.

== Description ==
It is a carved hollow wooden instrument with a large slit. In its traditional form, the muyu, the shape is somewhat bulbous like a bell, but modern instruments are often rectangular in shape. They are generally played in sets of four or more to give a variety of pitches, in which they are also known as "tone blocks". In Western music, they can be traced back to early jazz drummers where they were used as exotic instruments before being later adopted into widespread orchestral use. An updated version of the instrument made by Latin Percussion, known as "granite blocks", is made out of plastic rather than wood.

The sound of temple blocks is similar to that of normal woodblocks, although temple blocks have a darker, more "hollow" timbre. In their most common configuration of five, temple blocks are typically tuned to a pentatonic scale. Chromatic and diatonic sets have also been made. Despite this, they are not commonly treated as pitched percussion.

Temple blocks are often used as sound effects, such as in Leroy Anderson's "The Syncopated Clock" and "Sleigh Ride" where they mimic a ticking clock and a galloping horse, respectively. They can also be used to reinforce the melody. John Barnes Chance's Incantation and Dance and Variations on a Korean Folk Song both have temple blocks introduce and double the motifs that appear within the music, with the latter using the pentatonic nature of the temple blocks to evoke the sound of the Orient.
