= Arirang =

Korean folk song

- UNESCO Intangible Cultural Heritage
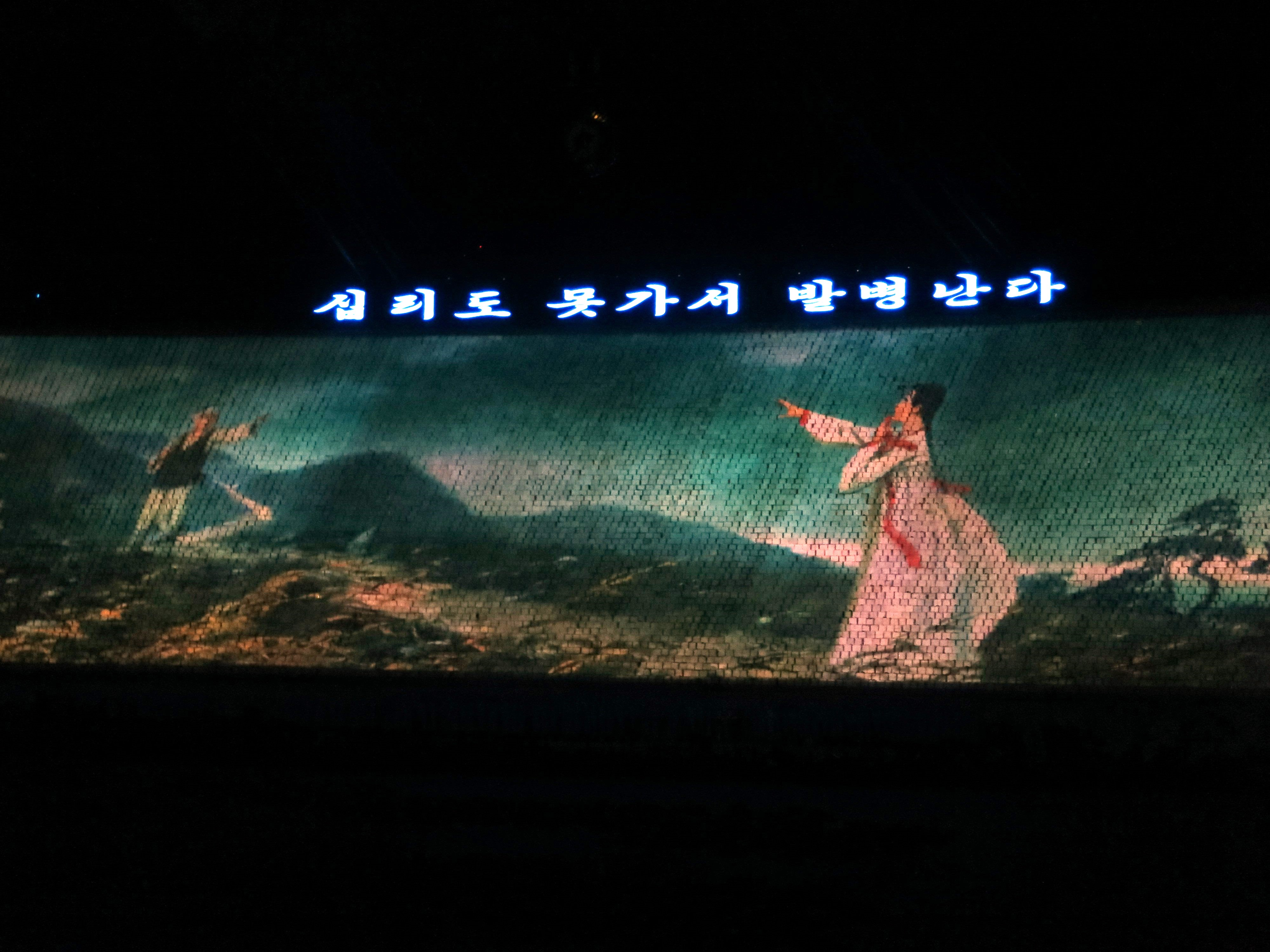
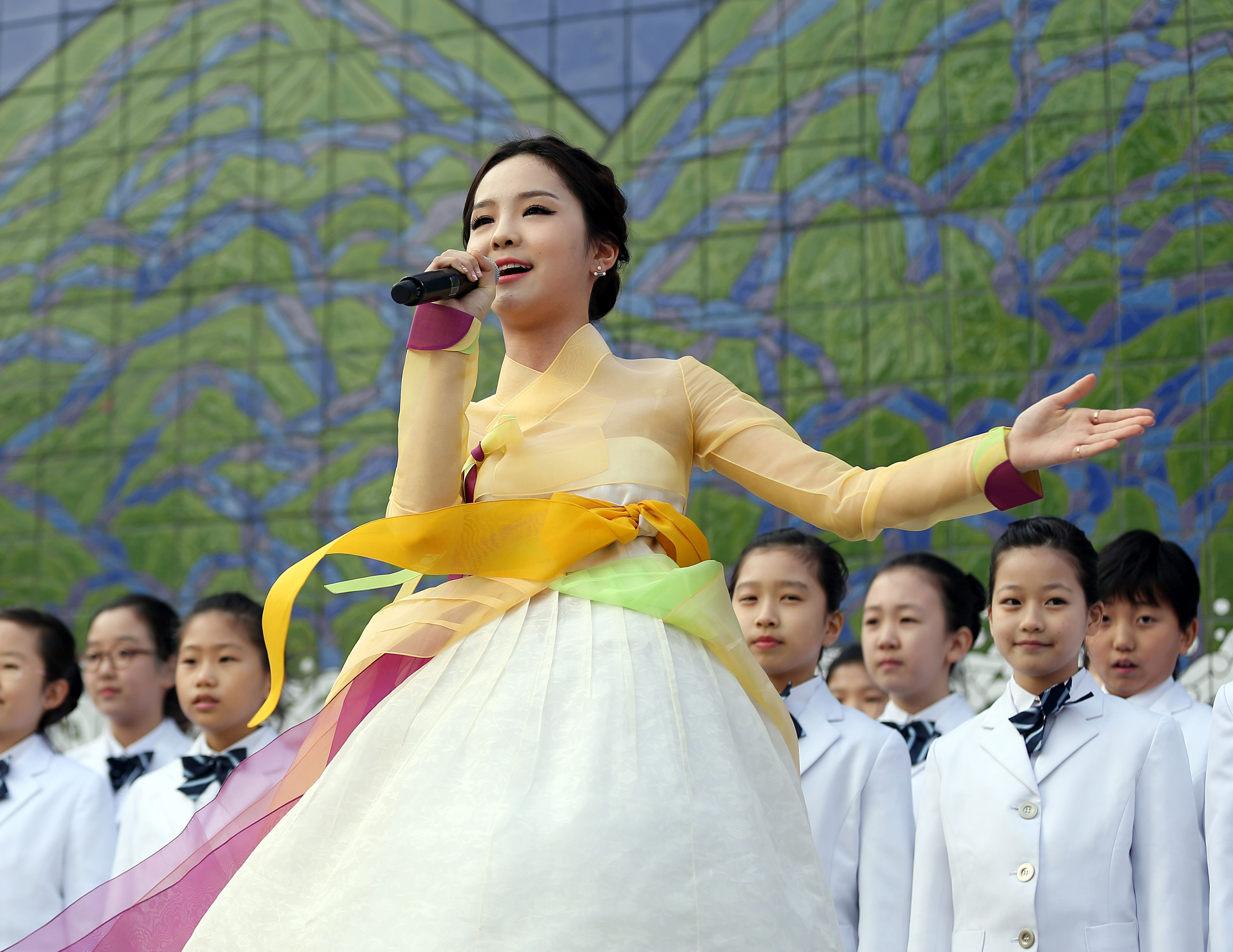
- An Arirang performance during the Arirang Mass Games in North Korea Song So-hee performing Arirang in South Korea

Arirang
- UNESCO regional groupings: Asia and the Pacific

UNESCO information (North Korea)
- Reference: 914
- Inscription history: 2014 (9th session)

UNESCO information (South Korea)
- Reference: 445
- Inscription history: 2012 (7th session)

Korean name
- Hangul: 아리랑
- RR: Arirang
- MR: Arirang
- IPA: a.ɾi.ɾaŋ
- Recording of Gyeonggi Arirang

"Arirang" (Korean: 아리랑; pronounced [a.ɾi.ɾaŋ]) is a Korean folk song. There are about 3,600 variations of 60 different versions of the song, all of which include a refrain similar to "arirang, arirang, arariyo" ("아리랑, 아리랑, 아라리요"). It is estimated that the song is more than 600 years old.

"Arirang" is included twice on the UNESCO Intangible Cultural Heritage list, having been submitted for inclusion first by South Korea in 2012 and then by North Korea in 2014. In 2015, the South Korean Cultural Heritage Administration added the song to its list of important intangible cultural assets.

The song is sung today in both North and South Korea and acts as a symbol of unity between the two nations, which are divided by the Korean conflict.

== History ==
=== Origin and ethnomusicology ===
It is believed that "Arirang" originated in Jeongseon, Gangwon Province. "Arirang" as a term today is ambiguous in meaning, but some linguists have hypothesized that "ari" (아리) meant "beautiful" and "rang" (랑) referred to a "beloved one" or "bridegroom" in the ancient native Korean language. With the two words together, the term arirang meant "my beloved one". This theory, supported by scholars such as Shin Yong-ha, bears the song's legend. According to the legend, the name is derived from the story of a bachelor and a maiden who fell in love while picking camellia blossoms near the wharf at Auraji (아우라지)—a body of water that derives its name from the Korean word "eoureojida" (어우러지다), which is closely translated to "be in harmony" or "to meet". For example, the body of water that connects the waters of Pyeongchang and Samcheok to the Han River is called Auraji. Two versions of this story exist:

- In the first one, the bachelor cannot cross Auraji to meet the maiden because the water is too high, so the two sing a song to express their sorrow.
- In the second version, the bachelor attempts to cross Auraji and drowns, singing the sorrowful song after he dies.

According to Professor Keith Howard, Arirang originated in the mountainous regions of Jeongseon, Gangwon, and the first mention of the song was found in a 1756 manuscript. The Academy of Korean Studies also shares the view that "Arirang" was originally a folk song of Jeongseon. Some Jeongseon locals trace the song further back, to the era of Goryeo.

Some believe that the song spread to Seoul and other regions of Korea when workers from Gangwon were sent to Seoul to rebuild the Gyeongbok Palace under the order of Prince Regent Heungseon of the Joseon period. Others theorize that the words "arirang" and "arari" in the song's lyrics originate from the families of the workers during this period, who said "arirang" (아리랑; 我離郞) or "ananri" (아난리; 我亂離) to the officials taking the workers from their Gangwon homes to the palace construction in Seoul, phrases that meant they couldn't be separated from their lovers or families, respectively. According to the Maecheonyarok (매천야록; 梅泉野錄), recorded by Joseon scholar Hwang Hyeon, it seems the song was widespread in the country by this time.

The South Korean literary scholar Yang Ju-dong has theorized that the term "arirang" came from the combination of "ari" (아리), the old Korean indigenous word that also meant "long", and "ryeong" (Korean: 령; Hanja: 領; lit. 'hill').

Some trace the term "arirang" to the name of Lady Aryeong, the wife of the first king of Silla, as the song could have evolved from a poem praising her virtues. Others have speculated that the term is linked to the Jurchen word "arin", meaning "hometown", or the name of an Indian god with a similar name.

=== First recording ===
The first known recording of "Arirang" was made in 1896 by American ethnologist Alice C. Fletcher. At her home in Washington, D.C., Fletcher recorded three Korean students singing a song she called "Love Song: Ar-ra-rang". One source suggests that the students belonged to noble Korean families and were studying at Howard University during the period in which the recording was made. Another source suggests that the singers were Korean workers who happened to be living in America during that time. The recordings are currently housed in the U.S. Library of Congress.

=== Resistance anthem ===
During the Japanese occupation of Korea, it became a criminal offense for anyone to sing patriotic songs, including Korea's national anthem, so "Arirang" became an unofficial resistance anthem against Imperial Japanese rule. Korean protesters sang "Arirang" during the March First Movement, a Korean demonstration against the Japanese Empire, in 1919. Many variations of "Arirang" that were written during the occupation contain themes of injustice, the plight of labourers, and guerrilla warfare. It was also sung by mountain guerrillas who were fighting against the occupiers. Thus, multiple versions of the song were banned in the 1930s for "disturbance of public order".

The most well-known lyrics to "Arirang" first appeared in the 1926 silent film Arirang, directed by Na Woon-gyu. Arirang is now considered a lost film, but various accounts state it was about a Korean student who became mentally ill after being imprisoned and tortured by the Japanese. The film was a hit upon its release and is considered the first Korean nationalist film.

=== Introduction to Japan ===
"Arirang" was introduced to Japan in the 1910s, when Koreans began immigrating there due to harsh working conditions in Joseon. The song gained popularity, and between 1931 and 1943, more than 50 Japanese versions were released across various genres, including pop, jazz, and mambo.

The version of "Arirang" sung in Okinawa retains more characteristics of folk music than mainland Japanese versions. After hearing the song being sung by Korean comfort women when he was young, Yonaha Hirotoshi built the Arirang monument in Miyakojima in 2008.

== Lyrics ==
All versions of "Arirang" include a refrain similar to "Arirang, arirang, arariyo (아리랑, 아리랑, 아라리요)". The word "arirang" itself is nonsensical and does not have a precise meaning in Korean. While the other lyrics vary from version to version, themes of sorrow, separation, reunion, and love appear in most versions.

The table below includes the lyrics of "Standard Arirang" from Seoul. The first two lines are the refrain, which is followed by three verses.

=== Original text in Korean ===
Hangul
Hangul/Hanja
Revised Romanization
IPA transcription

아리랑, 아리랑, 아라리요...
아리랑 고개로 넘어간다.

아리랑, 아리랑, 아라리요...
아리랑 고개로 넘어간다.

Arirang, arirang, arariyo...
Arirang gogaero neomeoganda.

[a̠.ɾi.ɾa̠ŋ a̠.ɾi.ɾa̠ŋ a̠.ɾa̠.ɾi.jo̞]
[a̠.ɾi.ɾa̠ŋ ko̞.ge̞.ɾo̞ nʌ̹m.ʌ̹.ga̠n.da̠]

나를 버리고 가시는 님은
십리도 못가서 발병난다.

나를 버리고 가시는 님은
十里도 못가서 발病난다.

Nareul beorigo gasineun nimeun
Simnido motgaseo balbyeongnanda.

[na̠.ɾɯɭ pʌ̹.ɾi.go̞ ka̠.ɕi.nɯn nim.ɯn]
[ɕʰim.ni.do̞ mo̞t̚.k͈a̠.sʌ̹ pa̠ɭ.bjʌ̹ŋ.na̠n.da̠]

청천하늘엔 잔별도 많고,
우리네 가슴엔 희망도 많다.

晴天하늘엔 잔별도 많고,
우리네 가슴엔 希望도 많다.

Cheongcheonhaneuren janbyeoldo manko,
Urine gaseumen huimangdo manta.

[tɕʰʌ̹ŋ.tɕʌ̹n.ɦa̠.nɯ.ɾe̞n tɕa̠n.bjʌ̹ɭ.do̞ ma̠n.ko̞]
[u.ɾi.ne̞ ka̠.sɯm.e̞n çi.ma̠ŋ.do̞ ma̠n.ta̠]

저기 저 산이 백두산이라지,
동지 섣달에도 꽃만 핀다.

저기 저 山이 白頭山이라지,
冬至 섣달에도 꽃萬 핀다.

Jeogi jeo sani baekdusaniraji,
Dongji seotdaredo kkonman pinda.

[tɕʌ̹.gi tɕʌ̹ sʰa̠n.i pe̞k̚.t͈u.sa̠n.i.ɾa̠.dʑi]
[to̞ŋ.dʑi sʰʌ̹t̚.t͈a̠.ɾe̞.do̞ k͈o̞n.ma̠n pʰin.da̠]

=== English translation ===
Arirang, arirang, arariyo...
You are going over Arirang hill.

My love, if you abandon me
Your feet will be sore before you go ten ri.

Just as there are many stars in the clear sky,
There are also many dreams in our heart.

There, over there, that mountain is Baekdu Mountain,
Where, even in the middle of winter days, flowers bloom.

== Variations ==
Old Arirang

Miryang Arirang

Jindo Arirang

Gangwondo Arirang

There are an estimated 3,600 variations of 60 different versions of "Arirang"; their respective titles are usually prefixed by their place of origin.

While "Jeongseon Arirang" is generally considered to be the original version of the song, "Bonjo Arirang" (literally: Standard Arirang) from Seoul is one of the most famous. This version was first made popular when it was used as the theme song of the 1926 film Arirang.

Other famous variations include "Jindo Arirang" from South Jeolla Province, a region known for being the birthplace of the Korean folk music genres pansori and sinawi; and "Miryang Arirang", from South Gyeongsang Province.

== Official status ==
"Arirang" performed by the United States Army Band Strings with a tenor soloist

=== China ===
In 2011, Arirang was added to the third batch of the "List of Representative Items of National Intangible Cultural Heritage of China".

In 2023, to celebrate the 70th anniversary of the founding of the Yanbian Korean Autonomous Region, ethnic Korean singer Cui Liling published the first "Arirang" variation about Heaven Lake on Jangbaeksan.

=== UNESCO ===
Both South and North Korea have successfully submitted "Arirang" to be included on the UNESCO Intangible Cultural Heritage list; South Korea in 2012 and North Korea in 2014.

=== South Korea ===
In 2015, the South Korean Cultural Heritage Administration added "Arirang" to its list of important intangible cultural assets.

"Arirang" performed by the United States Army Band Chorus with a tenor soloist

=== U.S. Army ===
"Arirang", lyrics in English, adaptation-2, by GSIT at HUFS in 2013. Adaptation of W. B. Yeats' poem "The Falling of the Leaves" into the "Arirang" melody to convey the woe and sorrow which the Korean people experience when listening to the song.

The U.S. Army's 7th Infantry Division adopted "Arirang" as its official march song in May 1956, after receiving permission from Syngman Rhee, the first president of South Korea. The division had been stationed in South Korea from 1950 to 1971, including during the Korean War period.

== In popular culture ==
=== Music ===
- American composer John Barnes Chance based his 1962–63 concert band composition Variations on a Korean Folk Song on a version of "Arirang" that he heard in Korea in the late 1950s.
- North Korean composer Choi Sung-hwan wrote the "Arirang Fantasy" in 1976. The New York Philharmonic performed a slightly modified arrangement of this work for an encore during its trip to North Korea on 26 February 2008.
- In 2007, the South Korean vocal group SG Wannabe released the album The Sentimental Chord, which contains a song entitled "Arirang".
- Chinese singer-songwriter Cui Jian interpolated "Arirang" into his song "Dance Across the 38th Parallel", which references the line of latitude that divides the Korean peninsula. The track is included on his 2005 album, Show You Colour.
- The 2026 tenth studio album by the South Korean boy band BTS is titled Arirang. The album's first track, "Body to Body", features a choral version of "Arirang" in the bridge.

=== Films ===
- Arirang is the title of filmmaker Na Woon-gyu's 1926 film, which popularized the song "Arirang" in the 20th century.
- Arirang is also the title of a 2011 South Korean documentary. The film won the top prize in the Un Certain Regard category at the 2011 Cannes Film Festival.

=== Media ===
- Arirang TV and Arirang Radio are international English-language media stations run by the Korea International Broadcasting Foundation.

=== Sports ===
- North Korea's mass gymnastics and performance festival is commonly known as the Arirang Festival.
- At the 2000 Summer Olympics opening ceremony in Sydney, Australia, South Korean and North Korean athletes marched into the stadium together carrying the Korean Unification Flag while "Arirang" played.
- South Korean fans used "Arirang" as a cheering song during the 2002 FIFA World Cup.
- South Korean figure skater Yuna Kim performed to "Arirang" during her free skate in the 2011 World Figure Skating Championships, where she placed second.
- Parts of "Arirang" were used many times during the 2018 Winter Olympics in Pyeongchang, South Korea, especially during the opening ceremony and in the Olympic Broadcasting Services TV intro. During the gala figure skating performance, Choi Da-bin skated to "Arirang".{{|date=April 2025}}
- At the 2018 Asian Games, "Arirang" was played when the Korea Unification Team won the gold medal in canoeing.
- South Korean figure skater Haein Lee performed to "Arirang" during her free skate in the 2022 Four Continents Figure Skating Championships, where she placed second.

=== Video games ===
- Kim Wu's theme in Killer Instinct has elements of "Arirang", sung by Hoona Kim.
- "Arirang" is used as the Korean civilization's theme in Sid Meier's Civilization VI.
- "Horangi Arirang" is the name of Hwang's theme in Soul Calibur.
