= 2008 visit by New York Philharmonic to North Korea =

Classical music concert in Pyongyang

The New York Philharmonic concert in Pyongyang, North Korea, on February 26, 2008, was a significant event in North Korea–United States relations. The orchestra played in East Pyongyang Grand Theatre, with the entire concert broadcast on North Korean state television.

== Concert ==
=== Program ===
New York Philharmonic at a performance at the East Pyongyang Grand Theatre in North Korea

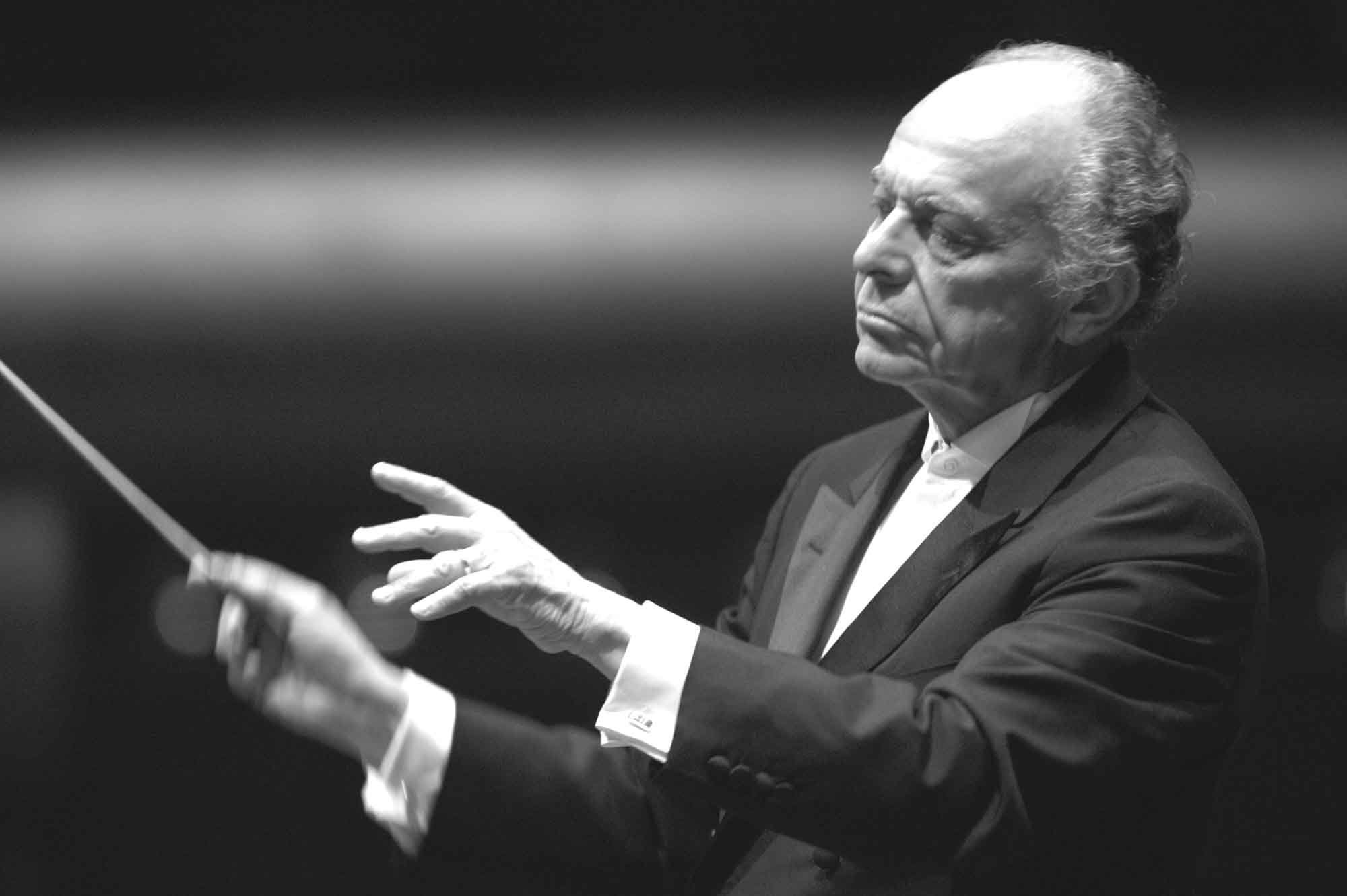
2006 photo of Lorin Maazel conducting the Philharmonic

The program, conducted by Lorin Maazel, included the national anthems of both North Korea ("Aegukka") and the United States ("The Star-Spangled Banner"), the Prelude to Act III of Lohengrin by Richard Wagner, Antonín Dvořák's Symphony No. 9 "From the New World", and George Gershwin's An American in Paris. Encores included the Farandole from Georges Bizet's Second L'Arlesienne Suite, Leonard Bernstein's Overture to Candide, and concluded with Choi Sung-hwan's 1976 "Arirang Fantasy", based on the popular Korean folk song "Bonjo Arirang". The Dvořák, Gershwin, and Bernstein works were each originally premiered by the New York Philharmonic, which is the oldest U.S. orchestra.

=== Attendance ===
North Korea's leader Kim Jong Il did not attend the concert, but vice president of the Presidium of the Supreme People's Assembly Yang Hyong-sop and the Foreign Ministry's America chief Li Gun were present.

=== Broadcast ===
At the request of the New York Philharmonic, a live national broadcast was aired on Korean Central Television. The TV recording of the concert was produced by the German production company EuroArts Music International and was broadcast live internationally on CNN in Canada and the United States, CNN International, MBC in South Korea, and SMC in China. Time delayed broadcasts were shown amongst others on Arte in France and Germany, on PBS in the United States as well as PBS's member station WNET locally in New York City, on SVT in Sweden, on DR in Denmark, on RTBF in Belgium, on MTV in Hungary. The concert was also streamed live on the New York Philharmonic's website.

The concert may have been remarkable in North Korea for its live coverage alone. Evans J.R. Revere, president of the Korea Society and a negotiator of the visit, stated he believed it to be unprecedented, as other major events are broadcast from videotape footage.

=== DVD ===
In spring 2008 the New York Philharmonic's Pyongyang concert was released worldwide on DVD (Medici Arts / EuroArts / Naxos).

== Political context ==
On August 13, 2007, the New York Philharmonic announced it was considering an invitation to perform in North Korea that it had received via "an independent representative of the Ministry of Culture".

On October 4, 2007, officials from the New York Philharmonic traveled to Pyongyang, accompanied by the executive director of the Korea Society and a member of the U.S. State Department's Office of Korean Affairs. They toured three concert halls including the Moranbong Theatre and the East Pyongyang Grand Theatre, which was chosen for its larger capacity. The group discussed permission to meet with local musicians, accompaniment of an international press corp, international broadcast issues, and logistical issues concerning transport and venue preparations.

The invitation was formally accepted on December 11, 2007, at a news conference attended by the president of the New York Philharmonic, the chairman, and North Korea's ambassador to the United Nations, Pak Kil-yon.

According to the South Korean news agency Yonhap, the possibility of civilian exchanges was discussed at the six-party nuclear disarmament talks in July 2007. The New York Philharmonic was specifically mentioned. Orchestra president and executive director Zarin Mehta billed the concert as "a manifestation of the power of music to unite people."

=== Effects ===
The North Korean government allowed unprecedented access to the country to more than 300 foreigners. Internet access and almost completely unrestricted international telephone calls were allowed for foreign journalists, something which is usually highly restricted.

The event was the first significant cultural visit from the United States to North Korea since the Korean War. The visit was anticipated as an opportunity to broaden relations with one of the world's most isolated nations. The U.S. State Department viewed the invitation as a potential softening of anti-U.S. propaganda.

Song Sok-hwan, North Korea's culture minister, said, "We hope this will be a big step toward increased bilateral cultural exchange between our two countries."

White House Press Secretary Dana Perino said, "I think at the end of the day, we consider this concert to be a concert, and it's not a diplomatic, you know, coup."

U.S. Secretary of State Condoleezza Rice said, "The North Korean regime is the North Korean regime," before attending the inauguration of the new president of South Korea Lee Myung-bak in Seoul, adding, "I don't think we should get carried away with what listening to [the concert] is going to do in North Korea."

== Funding ==
The orchestra received a donation from Yoko Nagae Ceschina, a Japanese philanthropist who lives in Italy. Zarin Mehta, the orchestra's president, is a friend of Kumho Asiana Group Chairman Park Sam-koo, who provided the Asiana Airlines Boeing 747. Munhwa Broadcasting Corporation offered to pay for the rights to broadcast a concert by the philharmonic in Seoul after the visit to North Korea.

== See also ==
- North Korea–United States relations
- Six-party talks
- Ping-pong diplomacy
- State Symphony Orchestra of the Democratic People's Republic of Korea
- Summit Series
- Spring is Coming
