= Clapper (musical instrument) =

Percussion instrument

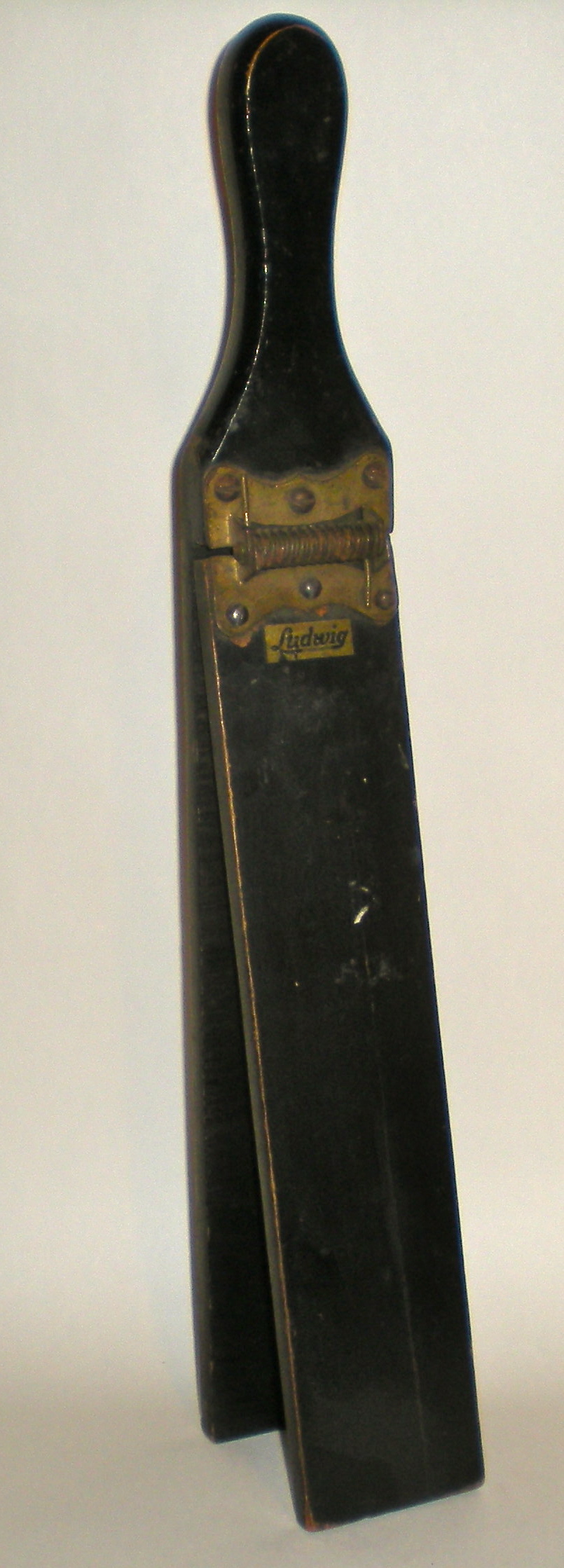
A slap stick manufactured by Ludwig

A clapper is a basic form of percussion instrument. It consists of two long solid pieces that are struck together producing sound. They exist in many forms in many different cultures around the world. Clappers can take a number of forms and be made of a wide variety of material. Wood is most common, but metal and ivory have also been used. The plastic thundersticks that have recently come to be popular at sporting events can be considered a form of inflated plastic clapper.

Several specific forms of clapper have their own names, such as the Chinese guban, Japanese hyoshigi, or the Korean bak. In the classical music of Thailand, a similar instrument is called krap. In India cooking tongs or cimṭā are often used to provide rhythm while singing religious hymns in many areas (sometimes tongs made specifically for the purpose are also equipped with bells). In Vietnam, the coin clapper called sinh tiền is widely used. In medieval French music, clappers called tablettes or cliquettes were used. In the Western symphony orchestra, a clapper called the whip (also called slapstick) is occasionally used in the percussion section.

== Whip/slapstick ==
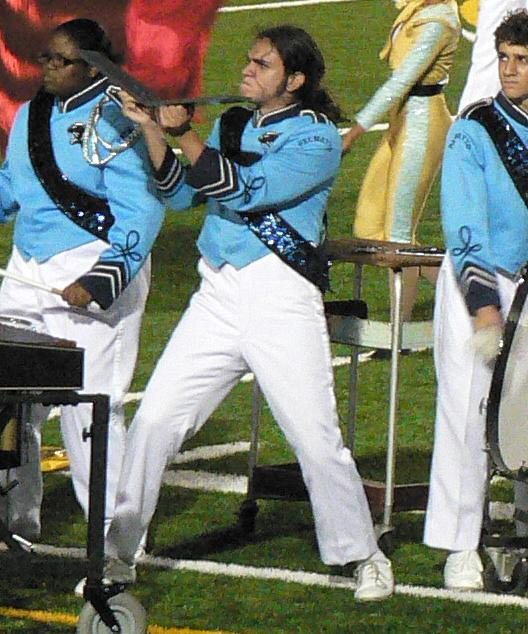
A whip being used in a front ensemble

In music, a whip or slapstick is a clapper (percussion instrument) consisting of two wooden boards joined by a hinge at one end. When the boards are brought together rapidly, the sound produces a sound reminiscent of the crack of a whip. It is often used in modern orchestras, bands, and percussion ensembles.

There are two types of whips. The first has two planks of wood connected by a hinge, with a handle on each. The percussionist holds the instrument by the handles and hits the two pieces of wood together, creating a loud whip noise. The other type also has two planks of wood, one longer than the other, with one handle, connected with a spring hinge so it can be played with just one hand, though it cannot produce sounds as loud as a whip requiring both hands. This second type of whip is technically a separate instrument called a slapstick.

== Usage in classical music ==
The whip is sometimes indicated in scores by the native words for "whip" (French fouet, German Peitsche, or Italian frusta) or a term indicating the clapper construction (French claquette or German Holzklapper).

This list is alphabetical, but is by no means exhaustive.

- John Adams: Nixon in China
- Thomas Adès: Living Toys (the whip is played by the lead French horn player), The Tempest and "Totentanz"
- Leroy Anderson: Christmas standard "Sleigh Ride", where the instrument is meant to imitate an actual whip on a horse
- Samuel Barber: Piano Concerto
- Benjamin Britten: The Young Person's Guide to the Orchestra, Noye's Fludde, Sinfonia da Requiem, Saint Nicolas, Spring Symphony, and War Requiem
- John Barnes Chance: Incantation and Dance
- Aaron Copland: Rodeo (Buckaroo Holiday), Symphony No.3
- George Gershwin: Piano Concerto in F
- Adam Guettel: The Light in the Piazza
- Daron Hagen: Shining Brow
- Alun Hoddinott: Fioriture
- James MacMillan: The Sacrifice
- Frederik Magle: Symphonic suite Cantabile
- Gustav Mahler: Symphonies No. 5 and 6
- William Mathias: Vistas, Laudi, and In Arcadia
- Olivier Messiaen: Des Canyons aux étoiles, Saint François d'Assise, and Éclairs sur l'au-delà…
- Modest Mussorgsky: Pictures at an Exhibition (the whip is used by the orchestrations of Maurice Ravel, Leopold Stokowski, Vladimir Jurowski and Henk de Vlieger's version for percussion ensemble)
- Krzysztof Penderecki: Symphony No. 1 (which begins with nine whip cracks punctuated by pauses)
- Maurice Ravel: Piano Concerto in G and L'heure espagnole (The Spanish Hour)
- Dmitri Shostakovich: Cello Concerto No. 2 in G (last movement), Symphony No. 13, Symphony No. 14 and Symphony No. 15
- Philip Glass: Symphony No. 8
- Juan María Solare: Un ángel de hielo y fuego
- Johann Strauss II: Unter Donner und Blitz
- Frank Ticheli: Fortress
- Michael Tippett: New Year (opera and suite version), The Knot Garden, The Ice Break, The Vision of Saint Augustine, Songs for Dov, and The Shires Suite
- Edgard Varèse: Ionisation
- Alexander Vustin: The Devil in Love
- William Walton: Belshazzar's feast
- Huw Watkins: Piano Concerto
- Bernd Alois Zimmermann: Die Soldaten

== Gallery ==
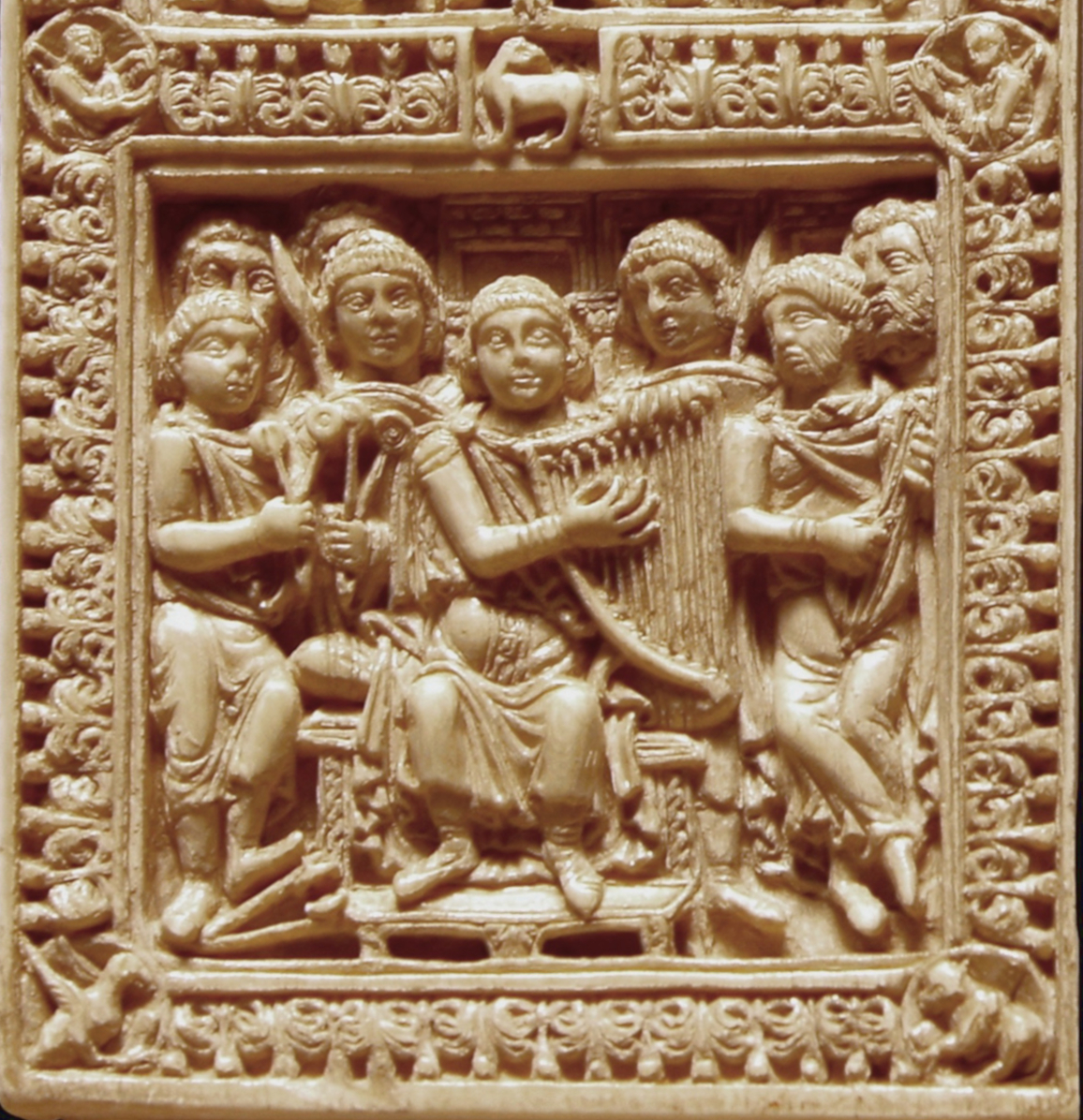
Circa 795 A.D. David playing the harp, accompanied by a plucked fiddle and clappers. Germany or France. Clappers from the Carolingian Empire appear to have been disks or possibly chimes attached to sticks.

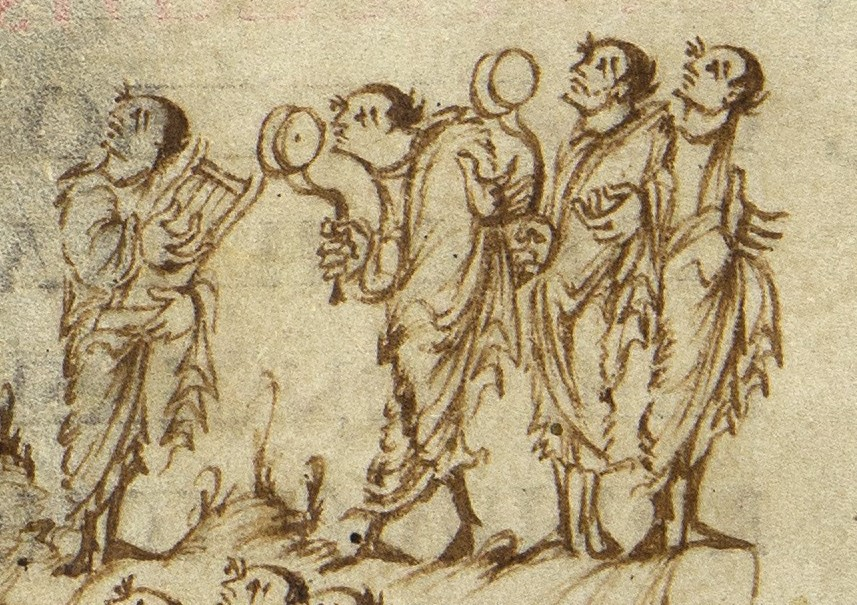
Circa 850 A.D. Musicians in the Utrecht Psalter holding a lyre and clappers.

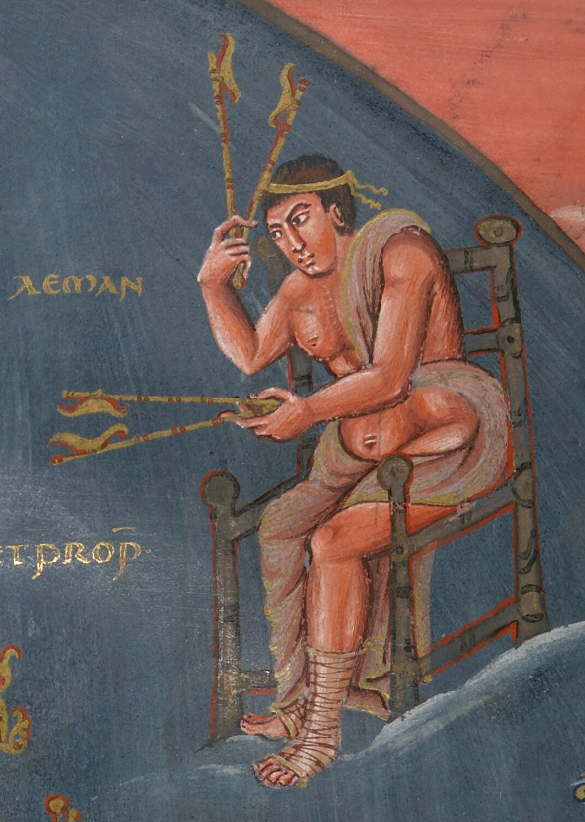
9th century A.D. Aeotan holding clappers in the Charles the Bald Bible.

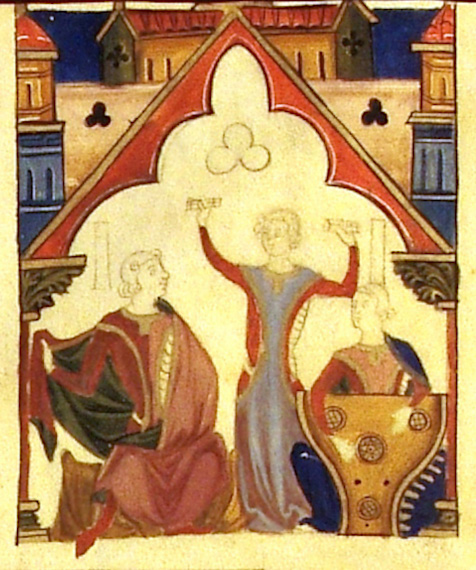
13th century Spain. Clappers raised overhead in a miniature in the Cancioneiro da Ajuda, folio 59

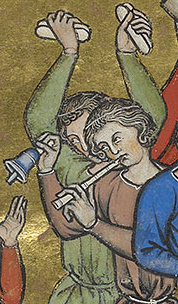
Circa 1250 A.D. Crusader Bible (MS M.638, fol. 39r) cropped for cliquettes. Also a bell and a clarinet.

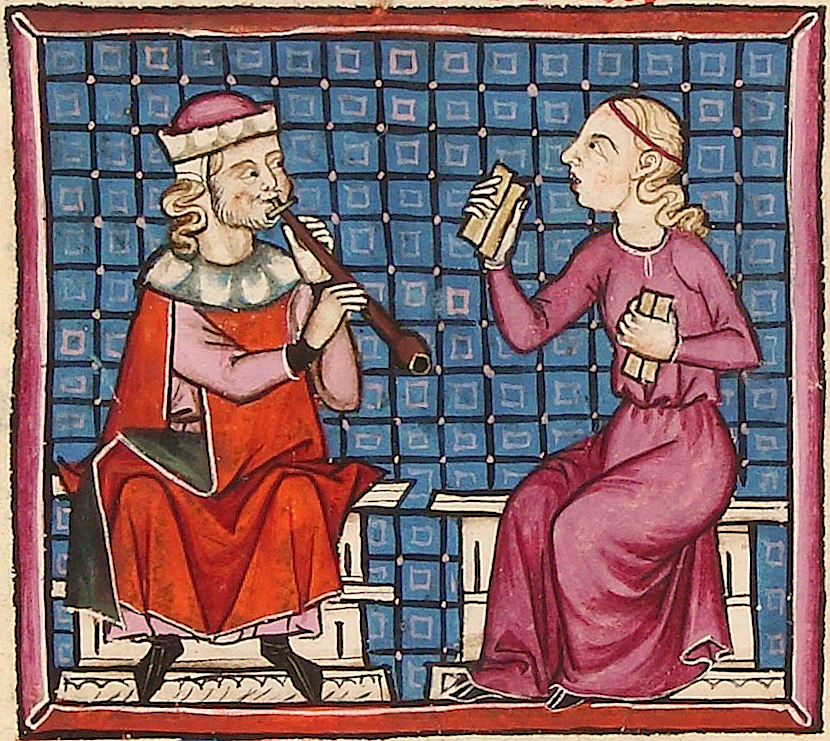
1280 A.D. Cliquettes or clappers (in the woman's hands) from the Musician's Codex, Cantigas de Santa Maria.

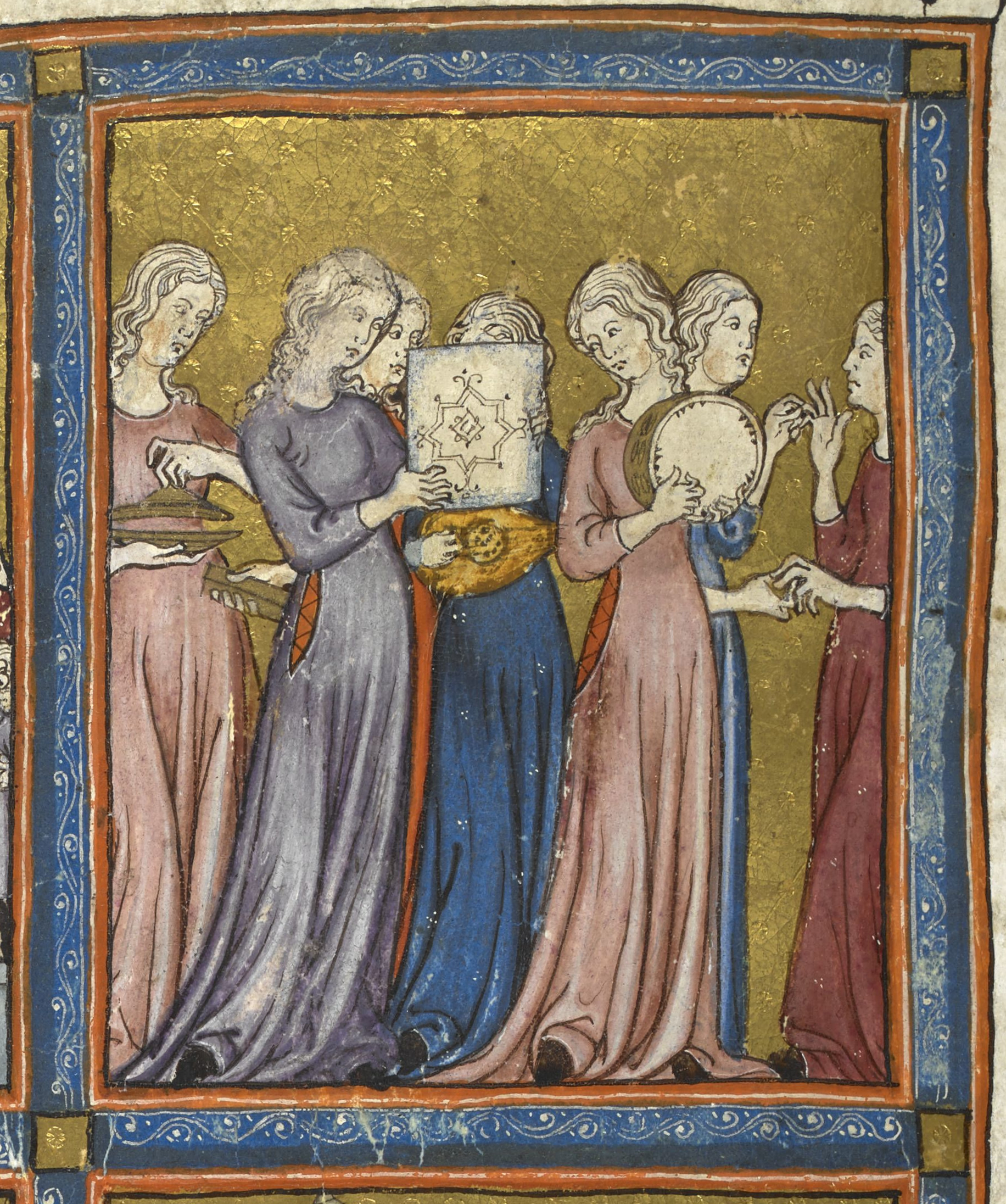
1320 A.D., Barcelona. Image from the Golden Haggadah. Image has cymbals, clappers, a lute and a tambourine.

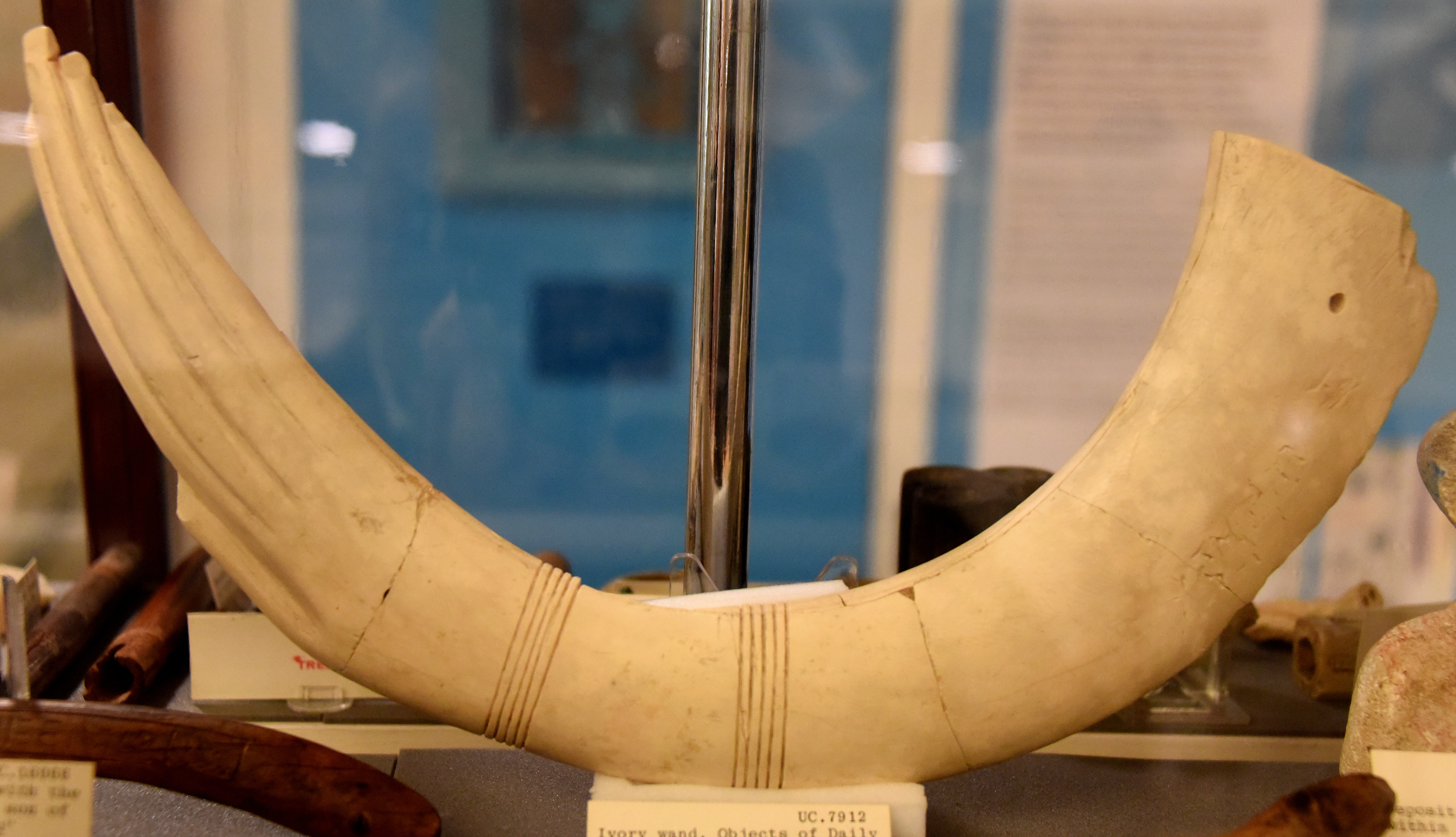
Clapper with the shape of a human hand. Probably elephant ivory. From Gurob, Fayum, Egypt. 18th Dynasty. The Petrie Museum of Egyptian Archaeology, London

== See also ==
- Bamboo clapper
- Crotalus (instrument)
- Paiban
- Scabellum, an ancient Greek and Roman foot-clapper on the sole of a sandal
- Thattai (instrument), an Indian and Nepalese clapper
- Torres Strait Islanders
