= Choi Sung-hwan =

Choi Sung-hwan may refer to:

- Choi Sung-hwan (footballer)
- Choi Sung-hwan (composer)
