= Arirang Fantasy =

1976 classical composition for orchestra

- by Choi Sung-hwan
- Year: 1976

Premiere
- Date: 1976

"Arirang Fantasy" (Korean: «아리랑 환상곡»), originally titled "Arirang" (Korean: «아리랑»), is a 1976 modern classical composition for orchestra by the North Korean composer Choi Sung-hwan, who died in 1981. It based on the Korean folk song "Arirang", specifically the "Bonjo Arirang" arrangement, which is the most popular and well-known of all the "Arirang" variations, thanks to its popularization in the 1926 film Arirang.

== History ==
In 1978, "Arirang Fantasy" was played in Japan by the Tokyo Philharmonic Orchestra, marking the first time the piece was performed in Japan.

In 2008, the New York Philharmonic visited North Korea and conducted by Lorin Maazel played a slightly-modified arrangement of the piece before a live audience at the East Pyongyang Grand Theatre.
