= Scabellum =

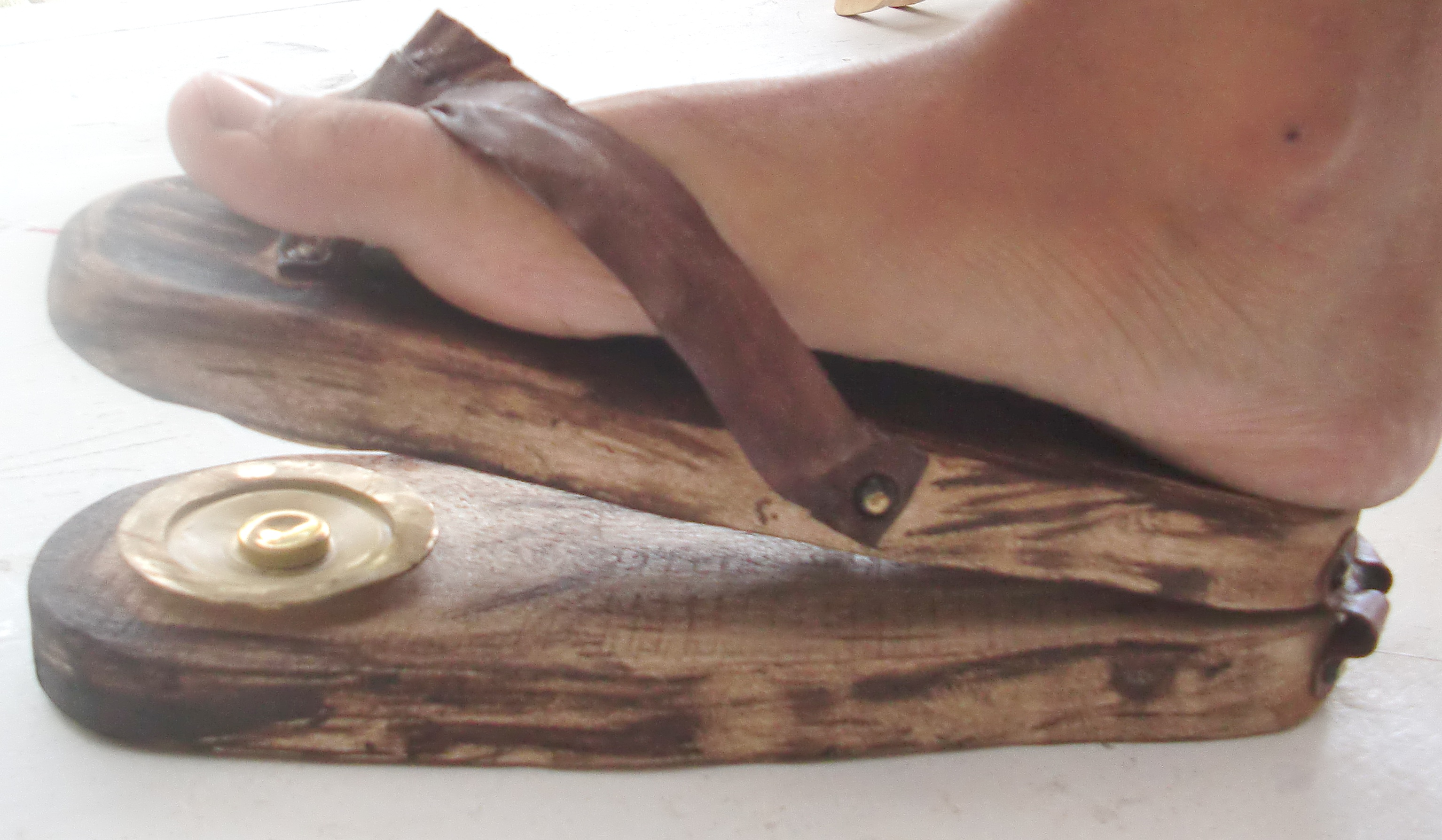
Reconstitution of a scabellum

A scabellum is a percussion instrument, a kind of clapper, used in ancient Rome and Greece. It is worn like a sandal on the right foot, used in antiquity by the conductor or by the aulos player to mark the rhythm. A scabellum is composed of two wooden or metallic plates, forming two thick soles connected by a hinge at the back. Two small cymbals were often fixed; it may be considered an ancestor of the hi-hat. The term is an unadapted borrowing from Latin.

== Sources ==
- Bélis, Annie (1988). "Kroupezai, Scabellum". Bulletin de correspondance hellénique (in French). 112 (1): 323–339. doi:10.3406/bch.1988.1748.
