= Sênh tiền =

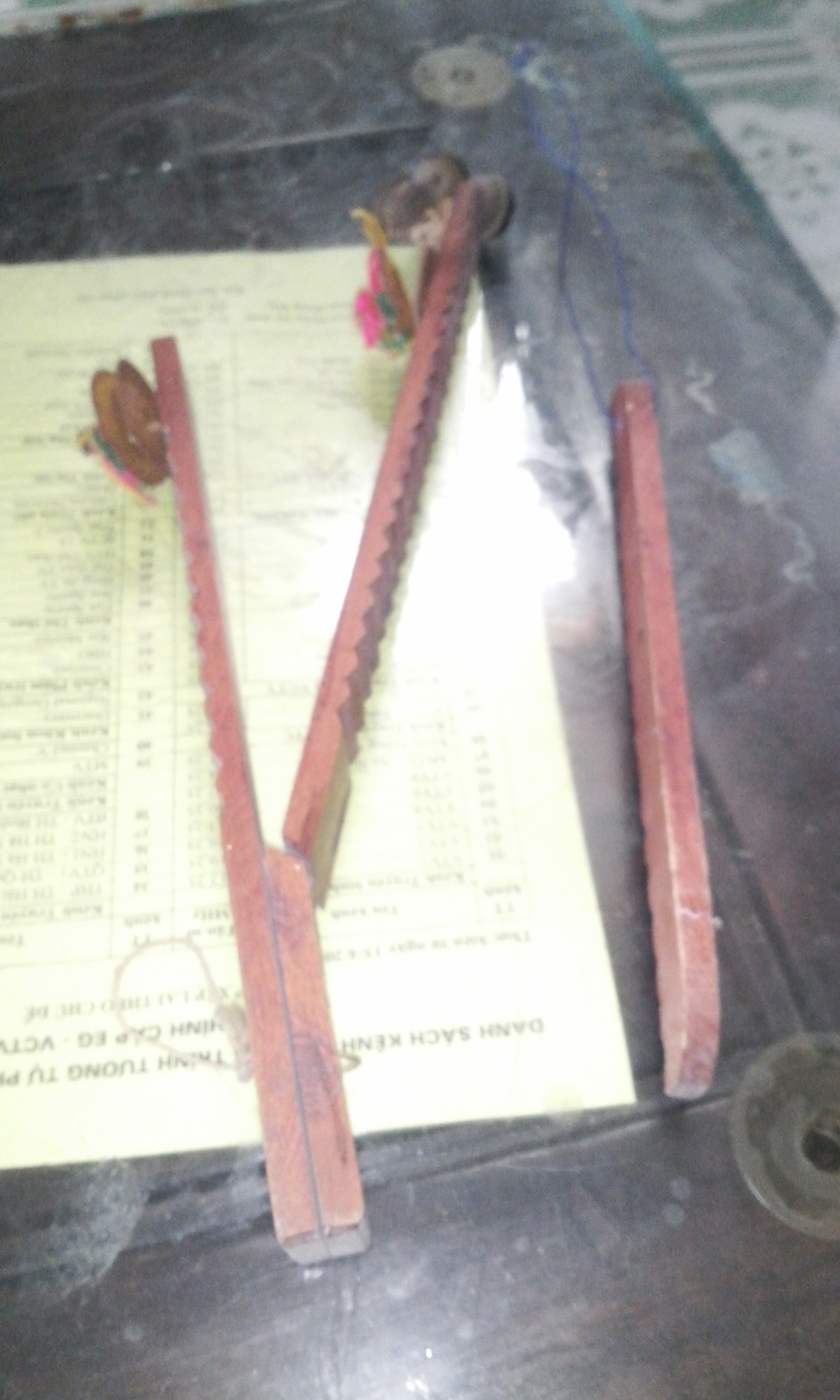
Sanh Tiền (or Sênh Tiền)

The sênh tiền or sinh tiền (formerly called phách sâu tiền or phách quán tiền) is a clapper used in Vietnamese traditional instrumental and vocal music. It is a combination of clapper, rasp, and jingle made from three pieces of hardwood and old Chinese coins. It is also played among the Muong people.
