= Woodblock (instrument) =

Musical instrument

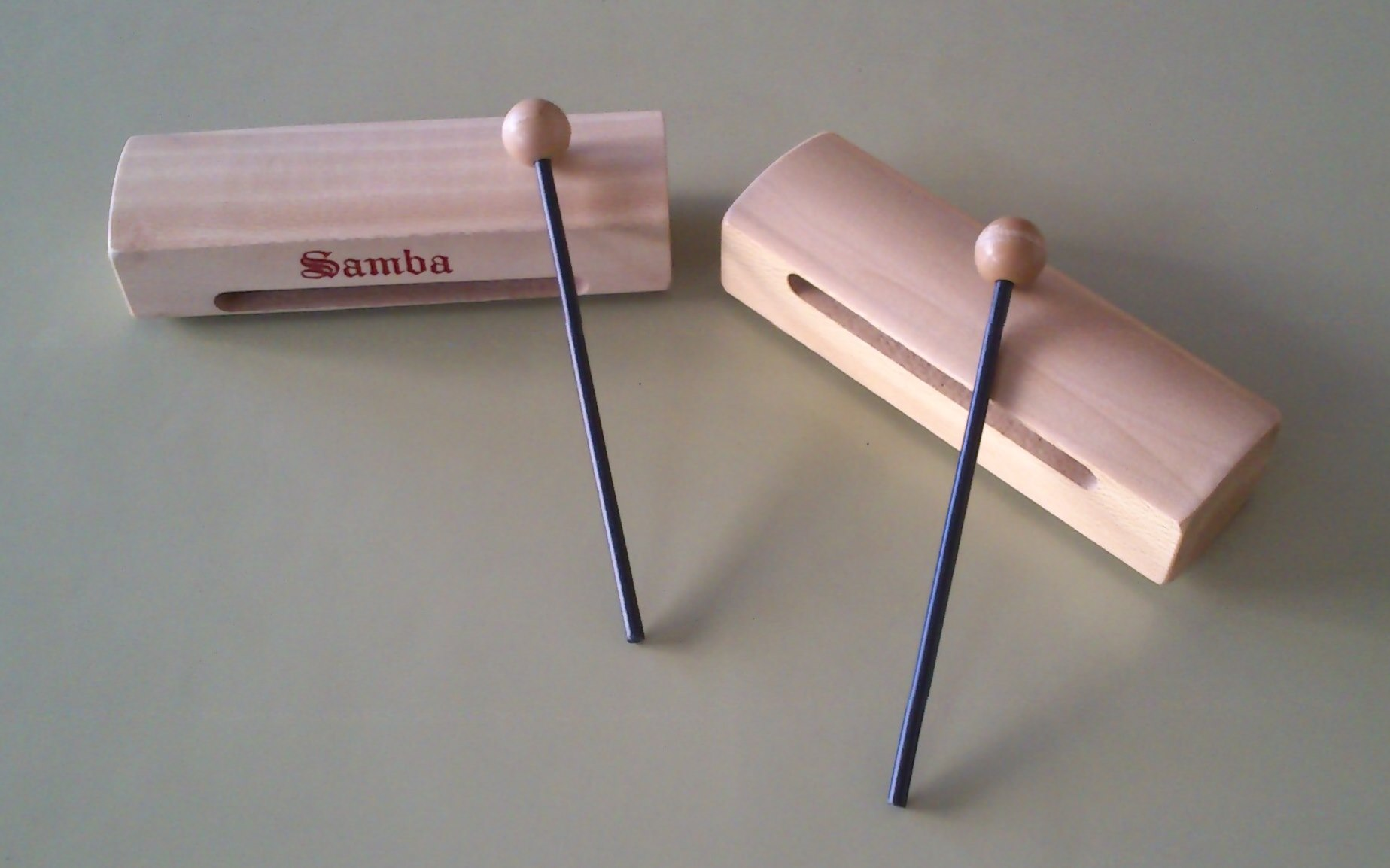

Percussion instrument
- Other names: Woodblock; clog box; tap box
- Classification: Percussion
- Hornbostel–Sachs classification: 111.242.1 (Individual bells)

Related instruments
- Slit drum; temple blocks; log drums; muyu; jam block

The sound of a woodblock

A woodblock (also spelled as two words, wood block) is a small slit drum made from a single piece of wood. The term generally signifies the Western orchestral instrument, but may also refer to the Chinese woodblock. In ragtime and jazz music, it is also known as the clog box or tap box. In orchestral music scores, woodblocks may be indicated by the French bloc de bois or tambour de bois, German Holzblock or Holzblocktrommel, or Italian cassa di legno.

The orchestral woodblock of the West is generally made from teak or another hardwood. The dimensions of this instrument vary, although it is either a rectangular or cylindrical block of wood with one or sometimes two longitudinal cavities. It is played by striking it with a stick, which produces a sharp crack. Alternatively, a rounder mallet, soft or hard, may be used, which produces a deeper-pitched and fuller "knocking" sound.

On a drum kit, a woodblock is traditionally mounted on a clamp fixed to the top of the rear rim of the bass drum.

== Related instruments ==
Log drums made from hollowed logs, and slit drums made from bamboo, are used in Africa and the Pacific Islands.

The muyu (simplified Chinese: 木鱼; traditional Chinese: 木魚; pinyin: mùyú) is a rounded woodblock carved in the shape of a fish and struck with a wooden stick. It is made in various sizes and is often used in Buddhist chanting, in China as well as in other Asian nations including Japan, Korea, and Vietnam. Also, in China, a small, rectangular, high-pitched woodblock called bangzi (梆子) is used. Typically used in sets of four different pitches, they are sometimes called "skulls" by jazz players because of their globular shape.

Temple blocks are a set of four or more woodblocks. Modern versions may be made of plastic instead of wood where they are known as granite blocks. Similarly, the jam block is a modern, plastic version of the woodblock.
