= Incantation and Dance =

Musical piece by John Barnes Chance

Incantation and Dance is a piece composed by John Barnes Chance in 1960 as his first work for wind ensemble. Before it was published in 1963, it went under the working title of Nocturne and Dance. It has become a cornerstone work in wind ensemble literature.

Chance wrote it during his tenure in Greensboro as part of the Ford Foundation's Young Composer Project and dedicated the piece to Herbert Hazelman and Greensboro Senior High School.

The piece is written in three cycles, each containing the "Incantation" theme, a "percussion concerto", and the "Dance" theme. The third cycle has these three sections played simultaneously rather than in succession. During the "percussion concerto" section, each percussion instrument introduces the rhythmic motifs that appear during the "Dance" section. This acts as a bridge between the "Incantation" and "Dance" sections.

== Instrumentation ==
The work is scored for the following band:

Woodwinds
Piccolo
2 Flutes
Oboe
Bassoon
3 Clarinets in B♭
Alto clarinet in E♭
Bass clarinet in B♭
Contrabass clarinet in B♭
2 Alto saxophones
Tenor saxophone
Baritone saxophone

Brass
4 Trumpets
4 Horns in F
2 Tenor trombones
Bass trombone
Baritone
Tuba

Strings
String bass

Percussion
Timpani
Maracas
Temple blocks
Gong
Claves
Tambourine
Cymbals
Gourd
Timbales
Bongos
Bass drum
Whip
