= Jamieson Stadium =

Stadium in Greensboro, North Carolina

Coordinates: 36°5′9″N 79°48′59″W

- Interactive map of Jamieson Stadium
- Full name: Jamieson Stadium
- Location: Greensboro, North Carolina
- Owner: Guilford County Schools
- Capacity: 10,000

Construction
- Opened: 1949

Tenants
- Greensboro College (NCAA); Grimsley High School (NCHSAA)

Jamieson Stadium is a stadium located on the campus of Grimsley High School in Greensboro, North Carolina. It opened in 1949 and was constructed largely from private funding sources. It was a dream of, and named for, Coach Bob Jamieson, who coached at Greensboro High (later renamed Grimsley High) from 1933-1975. The first game played at the stadium was the also the first annual North Carolina Coaches Association's East-West All Star Game, started by Coach Jamieson to help fund the Association's coaching clinic.

A plaque at the entrance to the stadium, erected for re-dedication ceremonies honoring Jamieson when he retired in 1975, has these words inscribed on it: "Robert B. Jamieson Stadium, named in honor of Coach Bob, whose dedication and devotion as teacher, coach, athletic director and community leader during the years 1933-75 have forever endeared him to the hearts of his players, students, and the citizens of Greensboro." Wooden bleachers were replaced with aluminum bleachers in 1989 in order to make sure it kept its status as one of the best high school football stadiums in the state.

It is primarily used for American football and Soccer, and is the home field of Grimsley High School and Greensboro College. Various sources report the stadium's seating capacity between 10,000-12,000 people. The stadium is horseshoe-shaped with the field house sitting at the open end and two largely symmetrical, slightly curved grandstands with pressboxes stretching from endzone-to-endzone joined together by a grassy hill, also used as a seating area.

The 6-lane running track around the field, which was longer than a standard running track, and the shot-put area beyond the southern goalpost, was removed in 2013. A small section of the track straightaway behind the field house remains and is used for storage. The original field house remains intact and in apparent use but its condition is unknown. Due to its size and the lack of large outdoor performing venues in the area, the stadium has been used for community events such as the annual 4th of July Fireworks with the Greensboro Symphony Orchestra.
