= Arirang (1926 film) =

Korean silent film by Na Woon-gyu

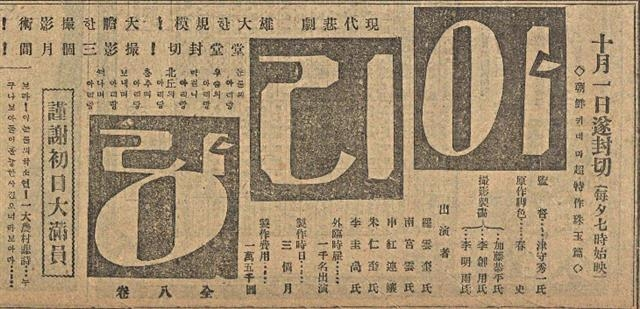
- 1926 promotion title on the Maeil Sinbo
- Hangul: 아리랑
- RR: Arirang
- MR: Arirang
- Directed by: Na Woon-gyu
- Written by: Na Woon-gyu
- Produced by: Yodo Torajo; Kim Chang-seon
- Starring: Na Woon-gyu; Shin Il-seon; Nam Gung-un; Ju In-gyu
- Cinematography: Kyōhei Katō
- Edited by: Kyōhei Katō
- Distributed by: Choson Cinema Productions
- Release date: 1 October 1926
- Running time: (1,599 feet) (9 reels) (roughly 135 minutes)
- Country: Korea, Empire of Japan
- Languages: Silent film Korean intertitles
- Budget: 15,000 Won

Arirang (Korean: 아리랑) is a 1926 Korean silent film directed by Na Woon-gyu, who is also one of the main cast. It is regarded as one of the most influential films in Korean cinema history, as well as the first Korean nationalist film and a critique of the Japanese rule of Korea. It is named after the traditional song "Arirang," which audiences were said to sing at the conclusion of the film. Arirang is considered a lost film, but a written record of the plot still exists.

== Plot ==
Yeong-jin is a student who has become mentally ill after being imprisoned and tortured by the Japanese for his involvement in the 1 March 1919 protest against the Japanese occupation of Korea. After his release, he returns home to live with his father and sister, Yeong-hui, in their village home. His old friend Hyeon-gu is now in love with Yeong-hui. While the villagers are preoccupied with a harvest festival, O Gi-ho, a collaborator with the Japanese police, attempts to rape Yeong-hui. Hyeon-gu fights Gi-ho, while Yeong-jin watches and has a vision of a couple in a desert begging a man for water. When the man in his imagination embraces the woman rather than offering her water, Yeong-jin stabs him with a sickle, actually killing Gi-ho. Yeong-jin regains his senses at this moment. The film ends with the Japanese police taking Yeong-jin back to prison, while the villagers weep.

== Cast ==
- Na Woon-gyu (羅雲奎) as Yeong-jin (金永鎭)
- Shin Il-seon (申一仙) as Yeong-hui
- Nam Gung-un (南宮雲) as Hyeon-gu
- Ju In-gyu as O Gi-ho

== Impact ==
=== Initial reception ===
Arirang premiered at the Dansungsa cinema in Seoul on 1 October 1926, and quickly became a national sensation and a commercial success, screening at cinemas throughout the country. The film was a departure from the standard melodramas popular at the time because of its metaphorical resistance to Japanese colonial rule. It is considered to be Korea's first nationalist film.

=== Legacy ===
Arirang is considered to be the first masterpiece of Korean cinema and an inspiration to many Korean filmmakers of the era. Today, the location where Arirang was filmed in Donam-dong, Seoul, is known as Arirang Movie Street. The street is home to Na Woon-gyu Park, the Arirang Cine Center movie theater, and the Arirang Information Library.

"Gyeongi Arirang", a variety of the song "Arirang", is thought to be originated from the song Na Woon-gyu made for the film.

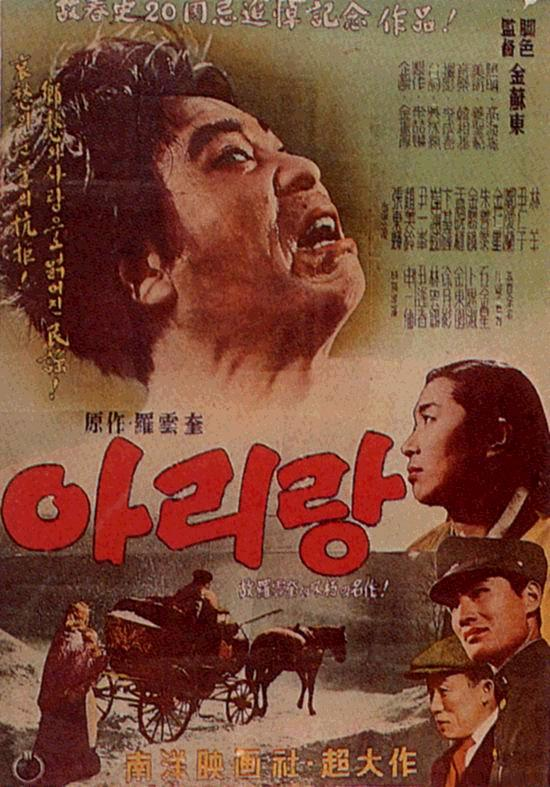
1957 remake film poster

=== Sequels and remakes ===
Na Woon-gyu made two sequels to Arirang: a silent film called A Story of the Day after Arirang (1930) and a sound film called Arirang 3 (1936).

Several directors have remade Arirang, including Lee Gang-chon in 1954, Kim So-dong in 1957, Yu Hyun-mok in 1968, and Lee Doo-yong in 2003. Lee Doo-yong's version was the first South Korean film to be publicly screened in North Korea.

== Lost status ==
Along with almost all Korean films of this era, Na Woon-gyu's Arirang is considered to be a lost film. The original nine reels of the film are believed to have been lost during the Korean War. However, a copy of the film was rumored to be in the possession of Japanese collector, Yoshishige Abe, who died in February 2005. His collection of approximately 50,000 films reverted to the Japanese government after his death, but no news has yet come forth as to whether Arirang was found in the collection.

== See also ==
- Korea under Japanese rule
- Cinema of Korea
- List of Korean-language films
- List of lost films
