= Variations on a Korean Folk Song =

Concert band music

Variations on a Korean Folk Song is a major musical piece written for concert band by John Barnes Chance in 1965. As the name implies, Variations consists of a set of variations on the Korean folk song "Arirang", which the composer heard while in South Korea with the U.S. Army in the late 1950s. In 1966 the piece was awarded the American Bandmasters Association's Ostwald Award.

The theme is based upon a concert A♭ major pentatonic scale. At the beginning of the composition, the first part of the theme, resembling Arirang, is introduced quietly in the clarinets; the other instruments join in to play the second part. The song then consists of five variations on this theme.

1. The first variation, marked Vivace, turns the theme into a series of rapid sixteenth notes, played by the woodwinds and temple blocks at first and then the entire band. It ends with a set of sixteenth notes played by the entire band in unison.
2. The second variation, marked Larghetto, is much slower. The second part of the original theme is played in inversion—first by a solo oboe, then by the flutes, alto saxophones and french horns, and finally the original theme returns played by solo trumpet.
3. The third variation, marked Allegro con brio, is a march in 6/8 time. The trumpets play a series of rapid eighth notes based on both parts of the theme; the woodwinds repeat this, and the march becomes more and more frenzied until it reaches its peak. At this point, the band plays a rapid descending whole tone scale starting in the highest voices and ending in the lowest. The variation ends with a snare drum solo.
4. The fourth variation, marked Sostenuto, is much slower and is in 3/2 time with a rhythmic ostinato played by the timpani on a G♭_{2} (bottom line of the bass clef) using "hard sticks on muted head" to create a hint of ethnic drum sound. The theme is played by the woodwinds, and then the brass joins in with a series of chords.
5. The fifth and final variation, marked Con islancio ("with impetuousness"), is faster and begins with a long solo in the percussion section. The piccolos and flutes join in, playing the second part of the theme, and then the brass enter playing the first part. This section is in 3/4 and is a hemiola; the brass play as if each measure were divided into two beats, while the woodwinds play three beats to a measure. For this reason, it is often conducted in one (i.e., the conductor only conducts the downbeat of each measure). The music grows louder and more excited and ends with a final quotation of the sixteenth note melody from the first variation.

A typical performance of Variations on a Korean Folk Song lasts 7-8 minutes.
