= John Barnes Chance =

American composer (1932–1972)

- Born: November 20, 1932; Beaumont, Texas
- Died: August 16, 1972 (aged 39) Lexington, Kentucky
- Occupation: Composer
- Instruments: Piano; percussion

John Barnes Chance (November 20, 1932 – August 16, 1972) was an American composer. Chance studied composition with Clifton Williams at the University of Texas, Austin, and is best known for his concert band works, which include Variations on a Korean Folk Song, Incantation and Dance, and Blue Lake Overture.

== Biography ==
Chance is believed to be a descendant of Robert Chance, a Mississippi gambler who settled in southeast Texas in the late 1800s. His parents, Mr. and Mrs. Robert Floyd Chance, were natives of southeast Texas. The youngest of three children, Chance's first musical experience started when he was 9 years old and began to take private piano lessons. In high school, Chance continued to perform in ensembles and met Arnold Whedbee, a band director, who would premiere the first movement of Chance's Symphony 1 at his graduation. At the University of Texas, from which he earned the degrees of bachelor of music and master of music, he studied composition with Clifton Williams, Kent Kennan, and Paul Pisk. In 1956–57 he was honored with the Carl Owens Award for student composition. After college he played timpani for the Austin Symphony Orchestra before becoming an arranger for the Eighth United States Army bands.

While serving in Seoul, South Korea, as a member of the Eighth U.S. Army Band, Chance came across a pentatonic Korean folk song named "Arirang" that served as the inspiration for his 1965 composition Variations on a Korean Folk Song, which became his best-known work. The Northwestern University Band premiered the work in March 1966 at the American Bandmasters Association convention, where the composition won the Ostwald Award.

After leaving the army Chance was the composer-in-residence at the Ford Foundation Young Composers Project in Greensboro, North Carolina, from 1960 to 1962. He joined the faculty of the University of Kentucky in 1966 and taught there until his death on August 16, 1972. He was accidentally electrocuted while working in the backyard of his home in Lexington, Kentucky. In May 1973, the auditorium at Greensboro Senior High School in Greensboro (where Chance had served as composer-in-residence from 1960 to 1962) was named in his honor.

== Contributions to music education ==
John Barnes Chance is considered an extremely important figure in the wind ensemble world. After being selected as one of 12 winners of the Ford Young Composers Project in 1960, Chance was able to work with the Greensboro City Schools (now part of the Guilford County Schools), under the direct supervision of ABA member Herbert Hazelman. In Greensboro, Chance was able to understand the limitations of high school students and was then able to compose for them. His first major wind ensemble composition, Incantation and Dance, was composed and performed during his residency with Greensboro Senior High School. Because of Chance's obligations of working with the entire district, he had to write music for many different grade levels. Chance composed thoughtful and involved music for percussion sections, which is something that most composers would not do at that time. Because of his contributions to writing more involved percussion music, more composers began to follow in his footsteps.

One of the reasons that Chance made such an impression on the students he mentored, conducted, and composed for, was his ability to take an interest in what the students wanted to learn. After his tenure at Greensboro, Chance found that his prior thoughts on only being a composer had changed, and that he was interested in becoming a music educator.

== Works ==
- Symphony No. 1, orchestra (1956)
- Overture to a Fairy Tale, orchestra (1957)
- Credo, trumpet and piano (1959)
- Incantation and Dance, concert band (premiered 11/16/1960; originally titled Nocturne and Dance)
- Fiesta!, orchestra (premiered 12/7/1961); transcribed for concert band by Herbert Hazelman (premiered 5/15/1975)
- Satiric Suite, string orchestra (premiered 3/23/1961)
- Blessed are They that Mourn, from Biblical text, chorus, horn, strings, and percussion (premiered 12/8/1960)
- The Noiseless, Patient Spider, text from Walt Whitman, female choir and flutes (1961)
- Alleluia, mixed chorus and concert band (premiered 3/1/1962)
- 3 Songs, text e. e. cummings, soprano, flute, and piano (1962)
- Ballad and March, on American traditional texts, mixed chorus and concert band (premiered 4/19/1961)
- Introduction and Capriccio, wind ensemble with piano (premiered 3/23/1961)
- Variations on a Korean Folk Song, concert band (premiered 3/11/1966); transcribed for orchestra by Robert Longfield (2006)
- Kyrie and Alleluia, chorus and orchestra (1967)
- Blue Lake Overture, concert band (1971)
- Elegy, concert band (1972), transcribed for orchestra by D. Wilson Ochoa (1997)
- Symphony No. 2, wind ensemble (1972) - (Allegro Energico movement premiered 11/15/1961)
- Burletta, a chromatic piece
- Overture to a Musical Comedy, concert band (premiered 5/23/1962) (published 1997 with slight title change: Overture for a Musical Comedy)
- WGOOM March, concert band (premiered 1/12/1961) (incorporated into Overture To A Musical Comedy 1962)
- Let Not Your Heart Be Troubled, (written in Greensboro)
- Concerto for Trumpet and Band, (written and premiered in 1972 as a joint commission between Doc Severinsen and Charles Forque)

== Awards ==
- Carol Owens Awards in Composition (1957)
- American Bandmasters Association's Ostwald Award (1966)
