= Choi Sung-hwan (composer) =

North Korean musician (1936–1981)

Choi Sung-hwan 최성환
- Born: 1936
- Died: 1981 (aged 44–45)
- Genre: Modern classical
- Occupation: Composer

Choi Sung-hwan (Korean: 최성환; 1936–1981) was a North Korean musician and composer, best known for composing the 1976 modern classical orchestral piece "Arirang Fantasy".
