= List of art deities =

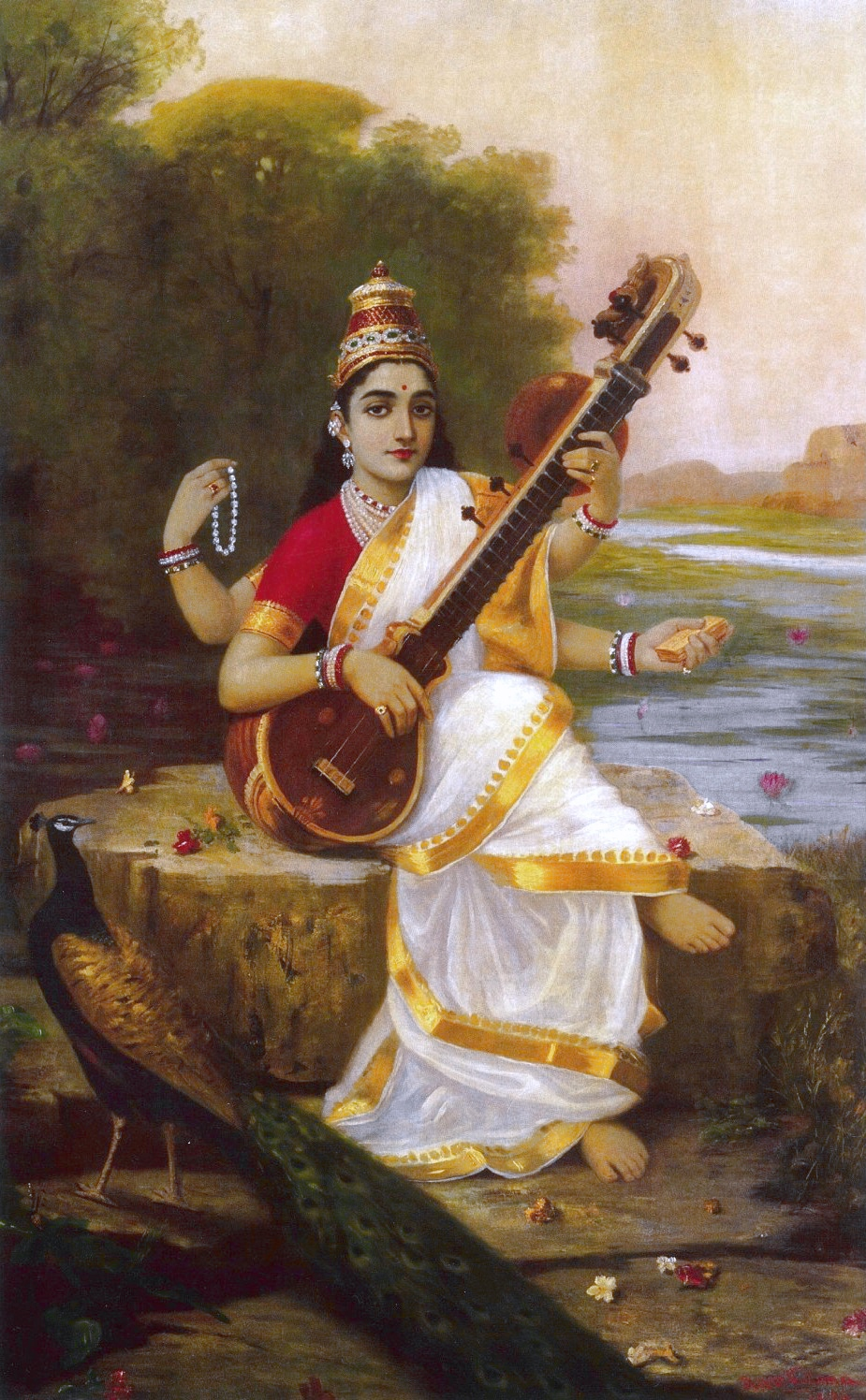
The Hindu goddess of the arts and music, Saraswati, depicted playing the musical instrument veena.

The following list of art deities is arranged by continent with names of mythological figures and deities associated with the arts. Art deities are a form of religious iconography incorporated into artistic compositions by many religions as a dedication to their respective gods and goddesses. The various artworks are used throughout history as a means to gain a deeper connection to a particular deity or as a sign of respect and devotion to the divine being.

== Africa and the Middle East ==
=== African ===
- Oshun, a goddess of beauty and is therefore associated with beautiful works of art

=== Afroasiatic Middle East ===
==== Canaanite ====
- Kotar or Kothar-wa-Khasis

==== Egyptian ====
- Bastet
- Bes
- Hathor
- Isis
- Khnum
- Meret
- Ptah
- Seker

=== Igbo mythology ===
- Ala

==== Mesopotamian ====
- Ishtar
- Nuska

== Western Eurasia ==
=== Ancient Kangleipak ===
- Panthoibi

=== Celtic ===
- Abhean
- Brigid
- Gwydion
- Lugh

=== Norse-Germanic ===
- Bragi
- Odin

=== Etruscan ===
- Menrva

==== Greek / Hellenic ====
- Aphrodite, goddess of beauty which may mean beautiful works of art, goddess of fertility and love
- Aglaia (Grace), goddess of splendor
- Apollo, god of medicine, music, poetry, song and dance
- Athena, goddess of wisdom, smart war and weaving
- Dionysus, god of wine and theatre
- Hephaestus, god of forge, sculpture and metalwork
- Poseidon, god of the sea
- Zeus, god of the sky and lightning
- Hera, goddess of marriage, family, women, and childbirth, queen of the gods, wife of Zeus
- Hades, god of the Underworld,
- Demeter, goddess of agriculture
- Artemis, goddess of the moon, archery and virginity
- Eros, god of love (greek cupid)
- Muses
  - Calliope, goddess of epic poetry
  - Clio, goddess of history
  - Erato, goddess of erotic poetry
  - Euterpe, goddess of lyric poetry
  - Melpomene, goddess of tragedy
  - Polyhymnia, goddess of hymns
  - Terpsichore, goddess of dance
  - Thalia, goddess of comedy
  - Urania, goddess of astronomy

==== Roman ====
- Apollo
- Minerva
- Venus
- Vulcan

=== Western Asia ===
==== Anatolian - Urarte ====
- Arubani

==== Hindu-Vedic ====
- Saraswati
- Ganesha
- Hayagriva

=== Sumerian ===
- Enki

=== Uralic ===
- Väinämöinen

== Asia-Pacific / Oceania ==
=== Meitei ===
- Khamlangba, associated with smiths
- Khamnung Kikoi Louonbi, associated with enchantment
- Lainaotabi, associated with charm, magic, pottery, sorcery, spell, weaving and witchcraft
- Nongpok Ningthou, associated with dance, music and festival
- Nongthang Leima, associated with enchantment and seduction
- Panthoibi, associated with dance, festival, handicrafts, pottery, spinning and weaving
- Phouoibi, associated with trickery to men
- Pisatao, associated with smiths
- Thangching, associated with divine plays

=== Far East Asia ===
==== Chinese ====
- Cao Guojiu, patron god of the theater
- Han Xiangzi
- Nüwa
- Zhang Guolao, who carries a fish-drum

==== Japanese ====
- Ame-no-Uzume-no-Mikoto
- Benzaiten

==== Vietnamese ====
- Phạm Thị Trân, the founder of Chèo
- Từ Đạo Hạnh, the founder of the art of water puppetry
- Tổ nghề Sân khấu, the three are said to be the founders of theatrical forms of Vietnam

=== Austronesia ===
==== Filipino ====
- Bait Pandi: the Bagobo goddess of weavers who taught women weaving
- Fu Dalu: the T'boli goddess of the abaca; speak and guide weavers on how to create patterns and designs, which are remembered in dreams
- Mamiyo: the Ifugao stretcher of skeins, one of the twenty-three deities presiding over the art of weaving
- Monlolot: the Ifugao winder of thread on the spindle, one of the twenty-three deities presiding over the art of weaving
- Rirryaw Añitu: place spirit Añitus who played music and sang inside a cave in Sabtang, while lighting up fire; believed to have change residences after they were disturbed by a man
- Tumungkuyan: leaders of the Salakap from Batak beliefs who paint tree trunks that support the sky using the blood of the epidemic-dead
- Mayari, a goddess of beauty which can mean beautiful art

=== Polynesian ===
==== Hawaiian ====
- Lono
- Pele

== Native Americas ==
=== North America ===
- Kokopelli (shared among various Southwestern Native American mythologies)

=== Mexico ===
==== Aztec ====
- Huehuecóyotl
- Xochipilli

==== Haitian Vodou ====
- Erzulie
- Maîtresse Délai

Mayan

- Ixchel, goddess of womanly crafts
