= Korouhanba =

Sun God in Meitei mythology

- God of the sun, sky and heaven
- Other names: Kolouhanpa, Numit, Taohuireng, Taodanba, Ngantureng
- Affiliation: Sanamahism
- Major cult center: Moidangpok
- Abode: Heaven
- Symbol: Sun
- Day: Sunday
- Texts: Numit Kappa, Soupon Lailemma Loutalon, Wakoklon Heelel Thilen Salai Amailon Pukok Puya
- Gender: Male
- Region: Manipur
- Ethnic group: Meitei
- Festivals: Lai Haraoba

Equivalents
- Greek: Helios, Apollo
- Hindu: Surya
- Roman: Sol
- Egyptian: Ra

Korouhanba (Meitei: ꯀꯣꯔꯧꯍꯟꯕ, lit. 'master of the sky') is the God of the Sun, the Sky and the Heaven in Sanamahism, the indigenous religion of Manipur. He is also known as Taohuireng and is one of the two sun brothers in the Numit Kappa epic legend. He is also called Ngantureng because of his ability to remove darkness. He is described as "Songbu Chiraitangba" — a physician who is bald headed.

== Description ==
According to the Meitei tradition, Korouhanba has a strong connection with the human body, human soul and also the origin of life. The human body is a lang (lit. trap). Inside the trap, the thawai polpi (lit. soul bird) is kept. When a person dies, the soul bird leaves the body and enters a new one. The process is called langon (lit. changing trap). The Polpilang Puya text describes the sun as the origin of life.

== Cults and pantheons ==
The Lai Haraoba festival is celebrated in the honor of God Korouhanba every year. The most significant shrine dedicated to Korouhanba is in Moidangpok town. The cults and pantheons dedicated to Korouhanba are mainly maintained by the Thokchom family. He has religious association with the Maring people.

== See also ==
- Pisatao
- Taoroinai
