= Thokchom =

Thokchom is a sagei (sub-clan or surname) specific to the Meitei/Meetei community of Manipur, a state in the northeastern region of India.

== Notable people ==
- Anuradha Thokchom (born 1989), Indian field hockey player
- Bonium Thokchom (born 1988), Indian actor and singer
- Kishan Thokchom (born 1990), Indian cricketer
- Nanao Singh Thokchom (born 1991), Indian boxer
- Thokchom Chandrasekhar Singh (born 1925), Indian politician
- Thokchom Lokeshwar Singh (born 1967), Indian politician
- Thokchom Martina Devi (born 2004), Indian footballer
- Thokchom Meinya (born 1945), Indian politician
- Thokchom Navakumar Singh, Indian politician
- Thokchom Radheshyam Singh, Indian politician
- Thokchom Santosh Singh (born 1992), Indian cricketer
- Thokchom Satyabrata Singh (born 1974), Indian politician
- Thokchom Umapati Devi (born 1994), Indian footballer

== See also ==
- Ningombam
