= Santosh Singh =

Santosh Singh may refer to:

- Thokchom Santosh Singh, Indian cricketer
- Santosh Singh (politician), Indian politician
