= Wooden fish =

Buddhist wooden percussion instrument

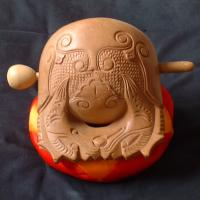
- Wooden fish

Chinese name
- Traditional Chinese: 木魚
Transcriptions
Standard Mandarin
- Hanyu Pinyin: mùyú

Tibetan name
- Tibetan: ཤིང་ཉ།
Transcriptions
- Wylie: shingnya

Vietnamese name
- Vietnamese alphabet: mõ
- Chữ Nôm: 楳

Korean name
- Hangul: 목어
- Hanja: 木魚

Japanese name
- Kanji: 木魚
- Kana: もくぎょ
Transcriptions
- Revised Hepburn: mokugyo

Manchu name
- Manchu script: ᡨᠣᡴᠰᡳᡨᡠ
- Romanization: toksitu

A wooden fish, also known as a muyu, moktak, mogeo, mokugyo, Chinese temple block, or wooden bell is a type of woodblock that originated from China that is used as a percussion instrument by monks and lay people in the Mahayana tradition of Buddhism. They are used in Buddhist ceremonies in China, Korea, Japan, Vietnam and other Asian countries. They may be referred to as a Chinese block, Korean block or, rarely, as a skull.

Wooden fish often used in rituals usually involving the recitation of sutras, mantras, or other Buddhist texts. In Chan, Seon, Zen and Thiền Buddhism, the wooden fish serve to maintain rhythm during chanting. In Pure Land Buddhism, they are used when chanting the name of Amitabha such as during the nianfo/nembutsu.

Wooden fish come in many sizes and shapes, ranging from 150 millimetres (5.9 in), for laity use or sole daily practice, or to 1.2 metres (3.9 ft) for usage in temples. Wooden fish are often (in Chinese temples) placed on the left of the altar, alongside a bell bowl, its metal percussion counterpart. Wooden fish often rest on a small embroidered cushion to prevent unpleasant knocking sounds caused from the fish lying on the surface of a hard table or ground, as well as to avoid damage to the instrument.

== Mythical origins ==
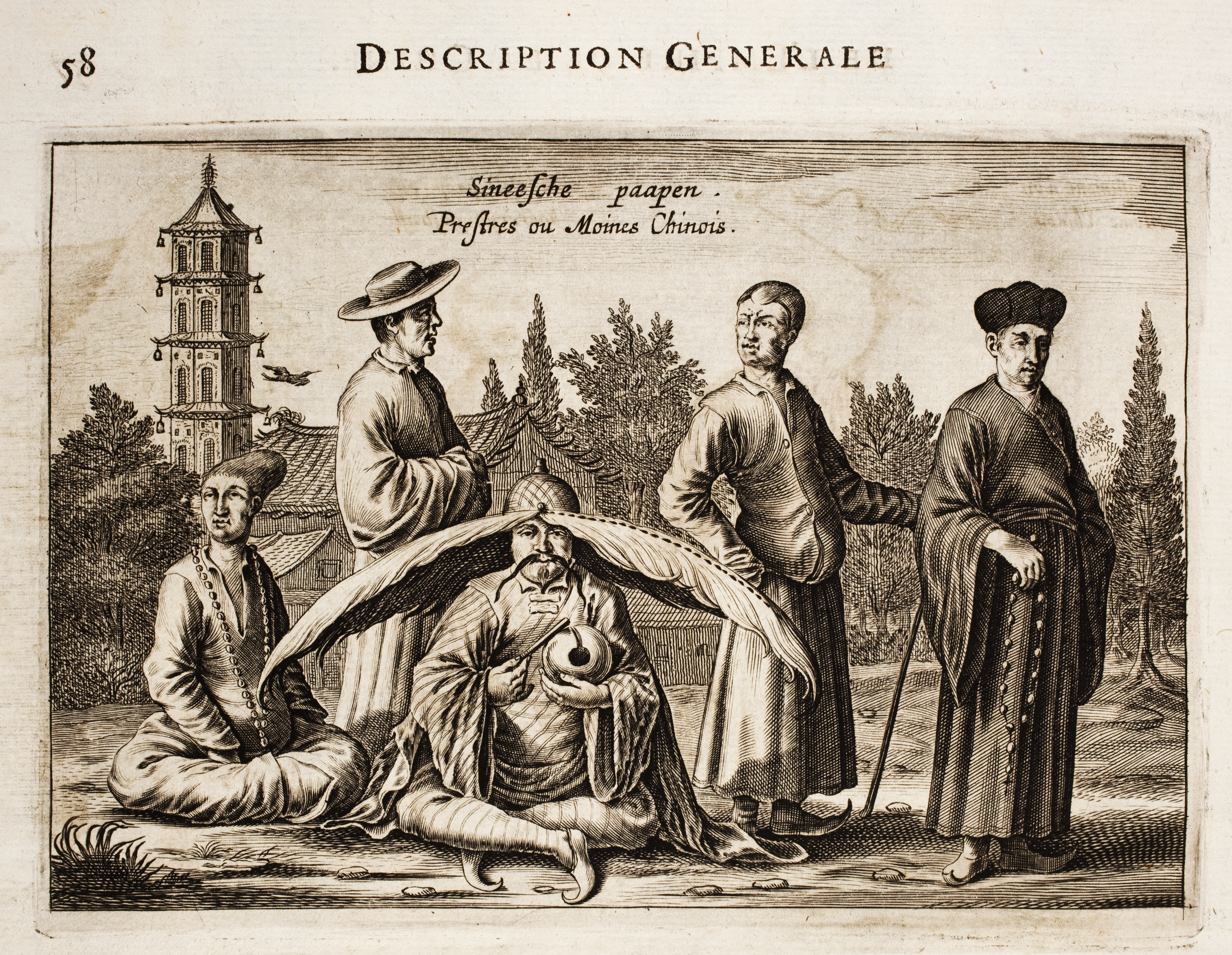
A mendicant with a "wooden fish" (sitting in the middle, with a big hat), drawn by Johan Nieuhof (Description générale de la Chine 1665) between 1655 and 1658

There are many tales associated with its invention. One Buddhist legend says that a monk went to India to acquire sutras but on his way he found the way blocked by a wide, flooded river. A fish offered to carry the monk across the river because it wanted to atone for a crime it had committed when it was a human. Its simple request was that on the monk's way to obtain sutras, he should ask the Buddha to guide the fish on a method to attain Bodhisattvahood. The monk agreed to the fish's request and continued his quest. On his return to China after 17 years with the scriptures, he came upon the flooded river. The same fish asked the monk if he had made the request to Buddha but the monk said he had forgotten. The furious fish splashed him into the river. A passing fisherman saved the drowning monk but all the sutras had been lost in the river. Filled with anger at the fish, the monk made a wooden effigy of a fish head which he beat with a wooden hammer. To his surprise, each time he hit the wooden fish, it made the sound of a Chinese character. He became so happy that he beat the wooden fish regularly. After a few years the monk had got back the lost scriptures he had lost to the flood from the mouth of the wooden fish.

== Usage ==
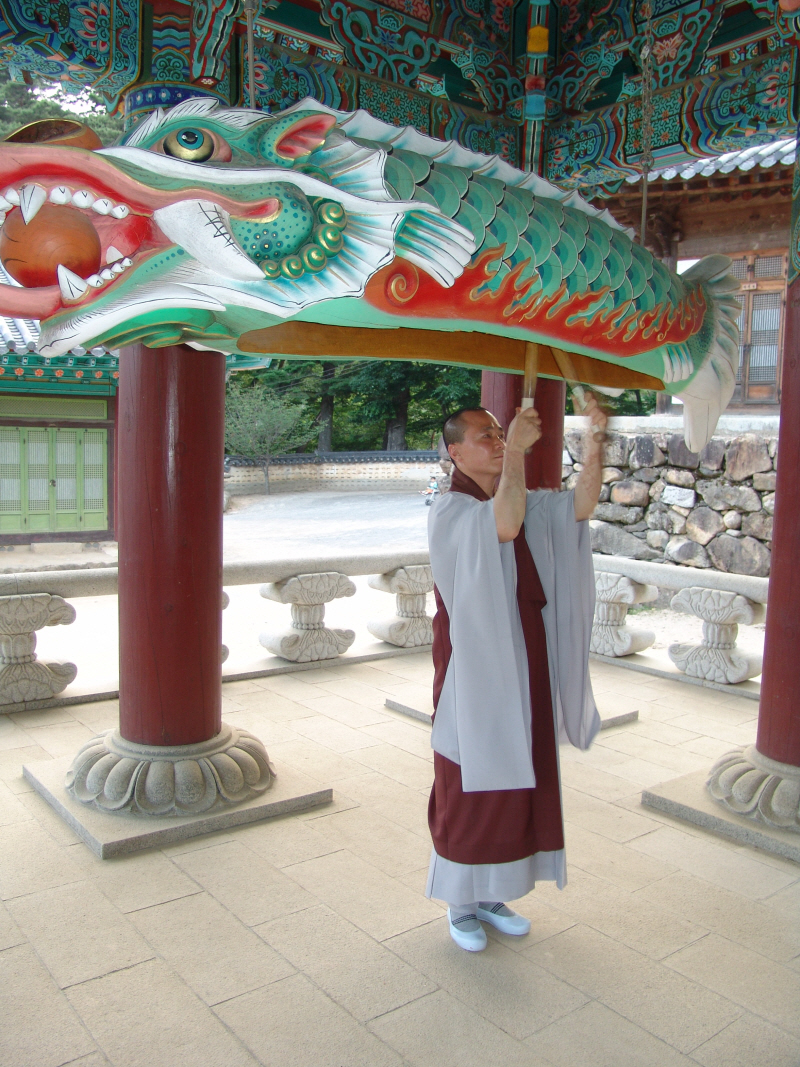
A Korean monk playing a mogeo

=== Traditional versions ===
In Chinese Buddhism, wooden fishes are known as muyu (hanzi: 木魚, pinyin: mùyú). The original type of wooden fish is in the shape of a dragon-fish hybrid creature. Along with a large temple bell and drum, It is found suspended in front of Buddhist monasteries. When proceeding with various duties (such as eating, lectures, or chores), a monk and a supervisor utilize the instrument to call all monastics to go to their tasks. Historically, this was the first wooden fish developed, which gradually evolved into the round wooden fish used by modern Buddhists.

The instrument is carved with fish scales on its top, and a carving of two fish heads embracing a pearl on the handle (to symbolize unity), hence the instrument is called a wooden fish for that reason. In Buddhism the fish, which never sleeps, symbolizes wakefulness. Therefore, it is to remind the chanting monks to concentrate on their sutra where recitation of texts is necessary and the sound symbolizes wakeful attention. It can also symbolize wealth and abundance. At funerals, the processions walk in a slow and unison rhythm while sounding wooden fishes. Other purposes include prayers for rain. In Confucianism, the wooden fish is struck at specific intervals to signify certain stages of ceremonies at temple. In Buddhism, it is struck during chants of Buddha's name.

In Korean Buddhism, wooden fish have seen broader use. Two separate words are used in Korean to distinguish different types of wooden fish. Moktak (Korean: 목탁; Hanja: 木鐸) refers to a smaller-sized, hand-held variant, whereas mogeo (목어; 木魚) means a full-sized piece that resembles a fish or dragon, with a hollow core. Moktak, a small version of mogeo (wooden fish), can come with ornaments, or not, and is more oblong in shape. It has a handle for easy carrying during portable uses. Mogeo are usually hung from the ceiling and played with two sticks drummed from the hollowed-out bottom.

In Japan, wooden fish are called mokugyo (kanji: 木魚; hiragana: もくぎょ), and some huge specimens found in Buddhist temples weigh more than 300 kg.

The Vietnamese name for the wooden fish is mõ (chữ Nôm: 楳), and the Manchu name is toksitu (ᡨᠣᡴᠰᡳᡨᡠ).

=== Modern types ===
The most common ones in use remain the traditional instruments that are round in shape and often made out of wood. However, other materials are now used as well such as composite plastic. All instruments are hollow with a ridge outside that provide the hollow sound when struck. The hollow tone differs among wooden fish because of their size, material, and the size of its internal hollow. Often the mallet used to strike the fish has a rubber coated tip to provide a muffled, but clear sound when struck. A simplified form is given in the temple block.

== Gallery ==
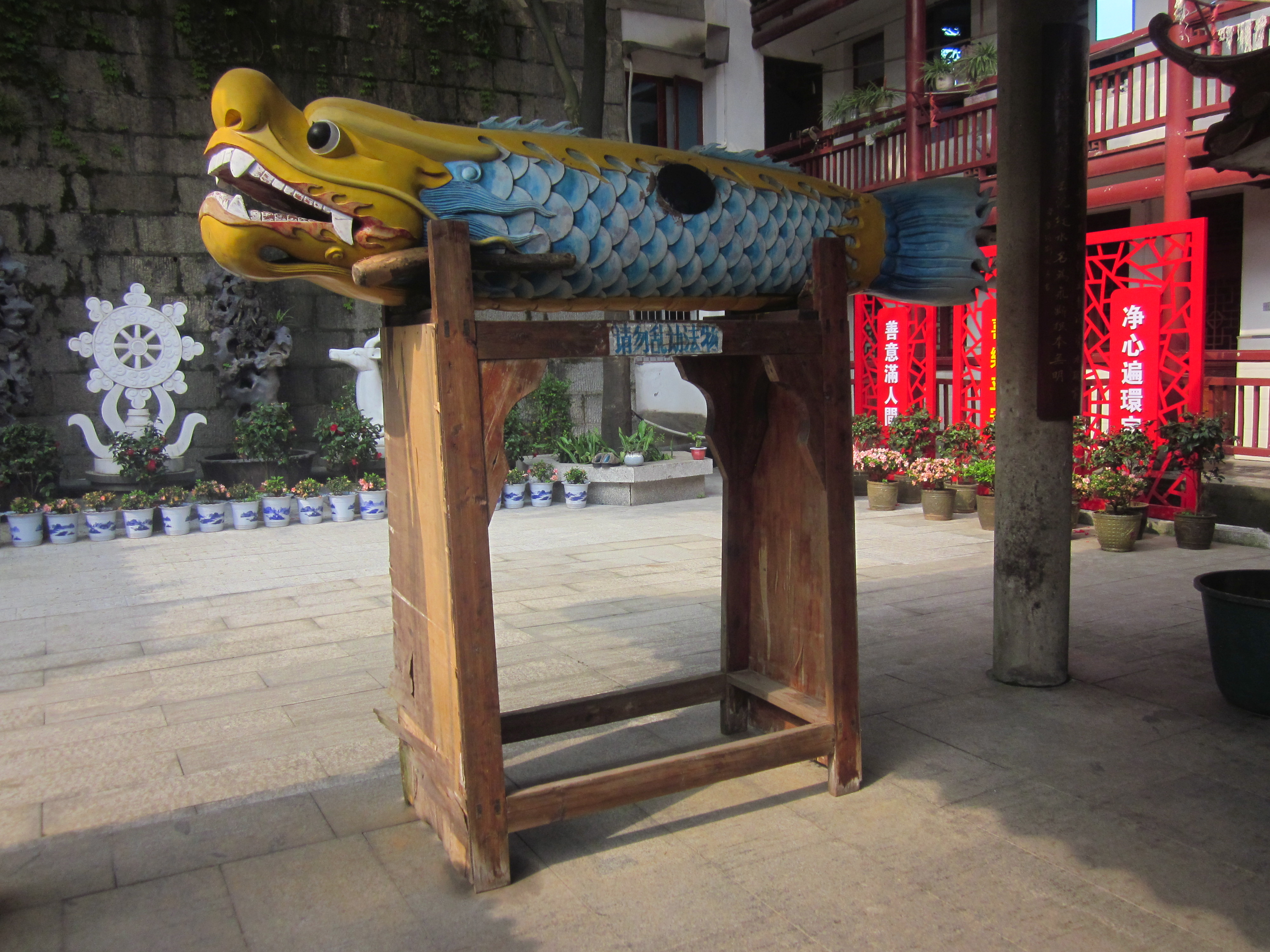
Muyu at White Deer Temple in Hunan, China.

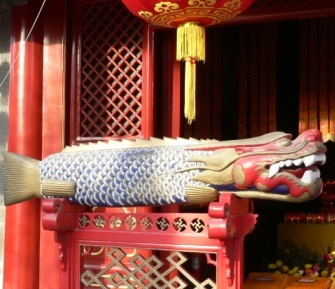
Muyu at Guanghua Temple in Beijing, China.

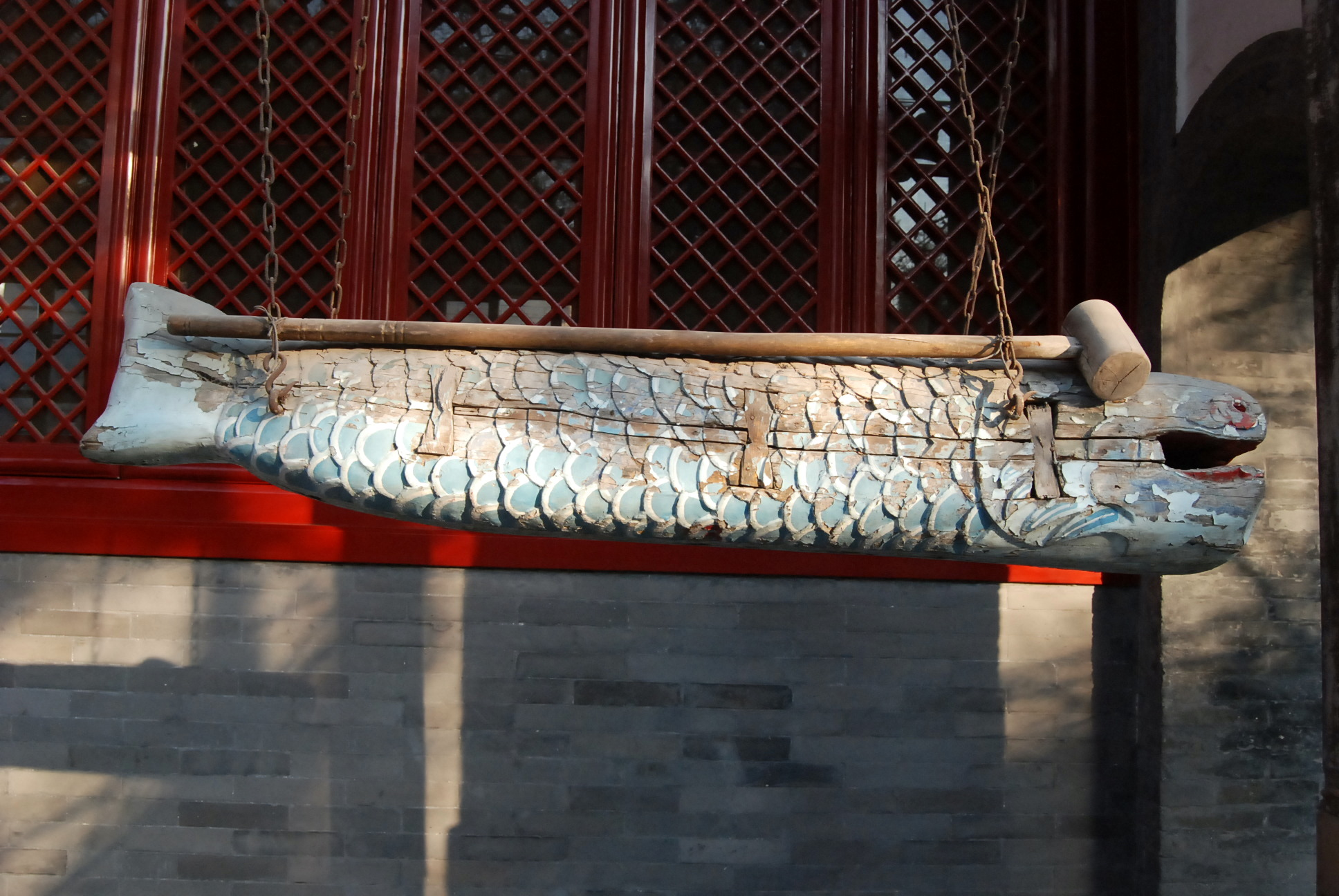
Muyu at Fayuan Temple in Beijing, China.

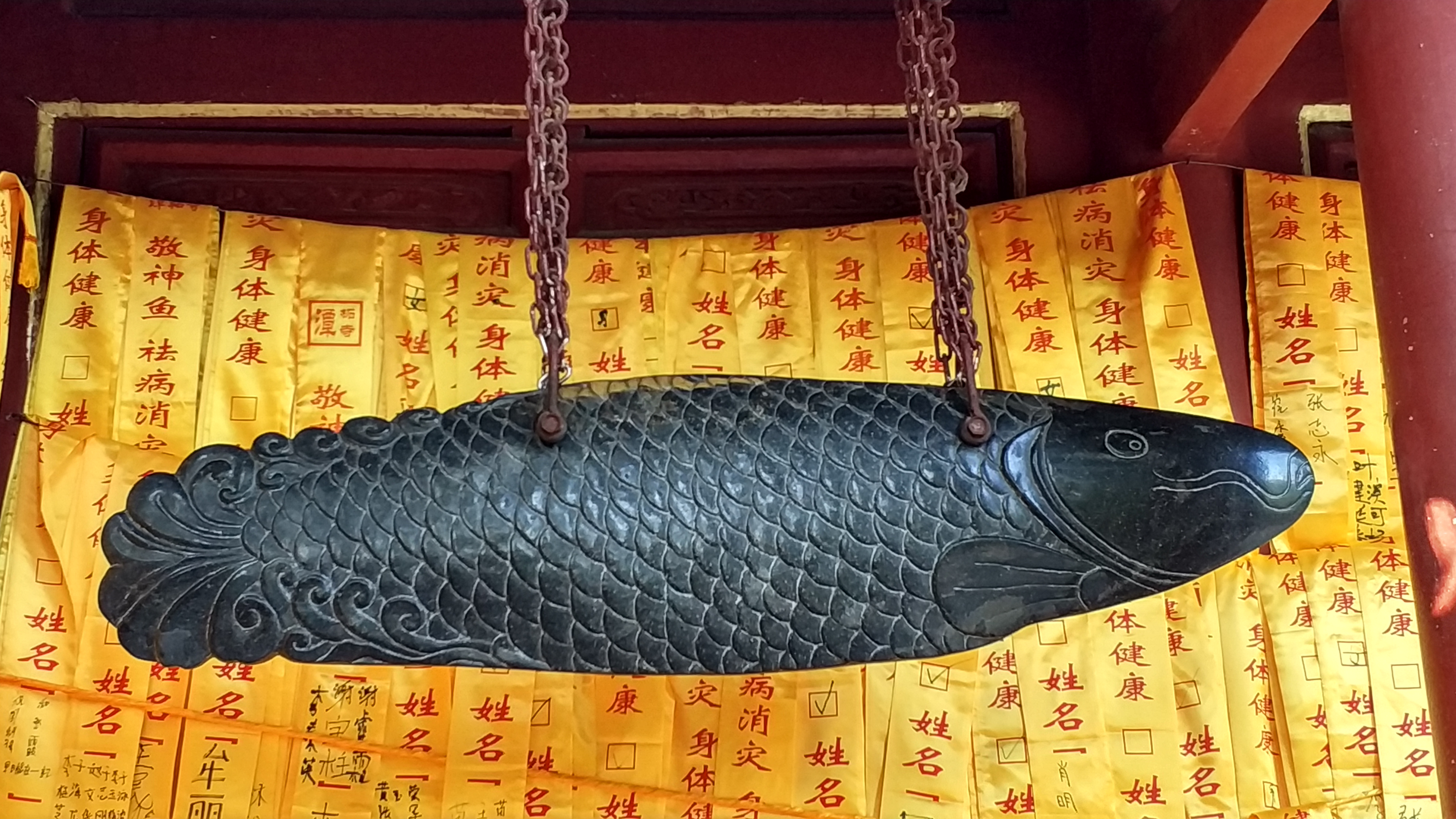
Stone muyu at Tanzhe Temple in Beijing, China.

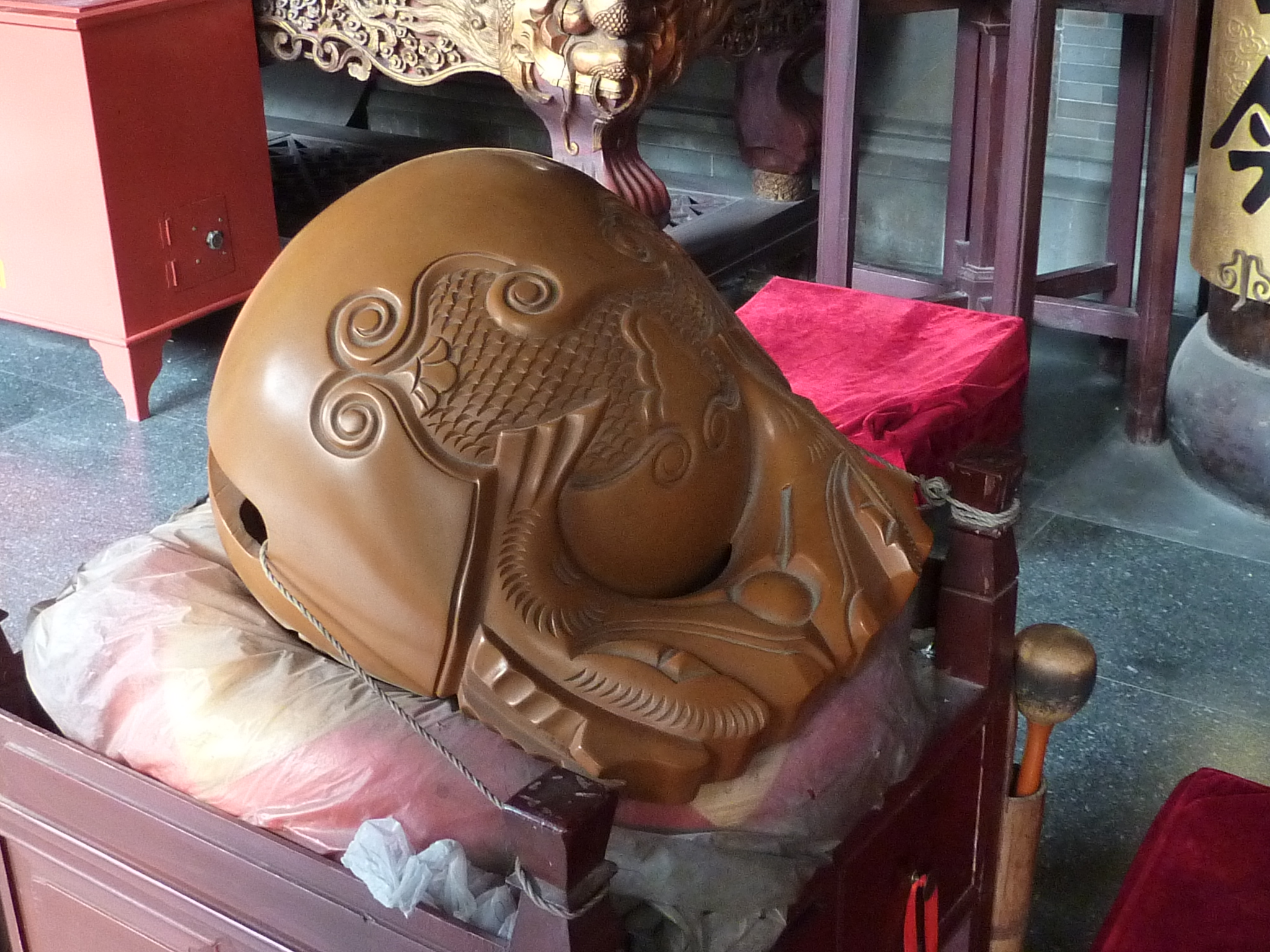
Muyu at Jingzhong Temple in Yangzhou, China.

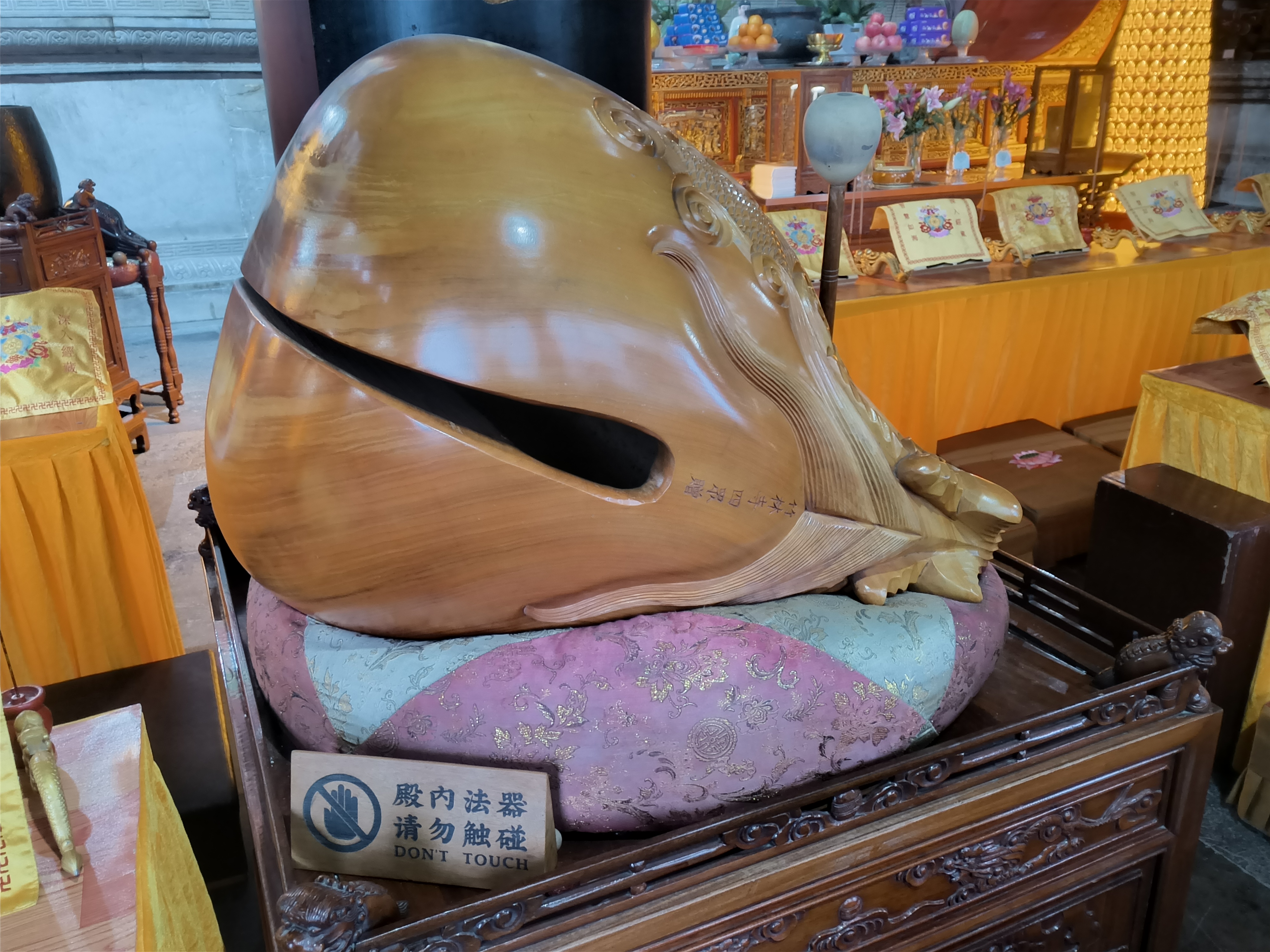
Muyu at Tianning Temple in Changzhou, China.

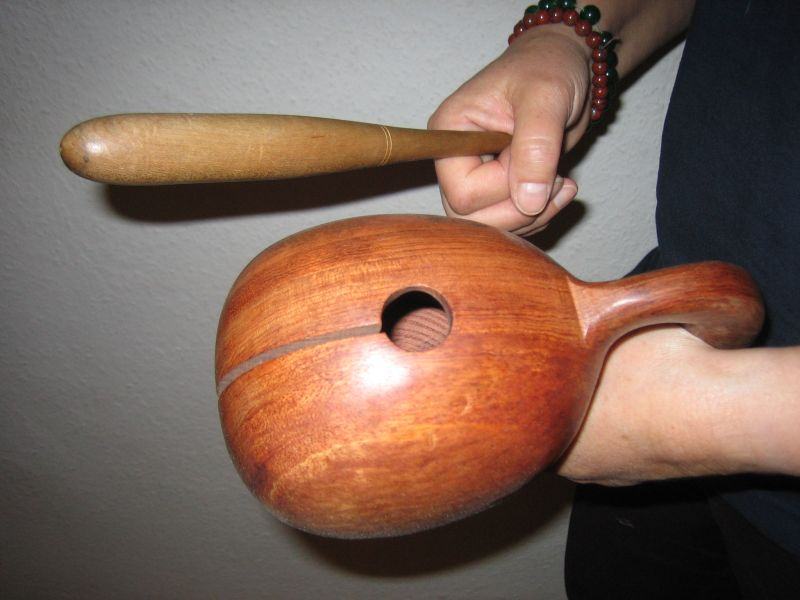
Moktak, a Korean variant of wooden fish

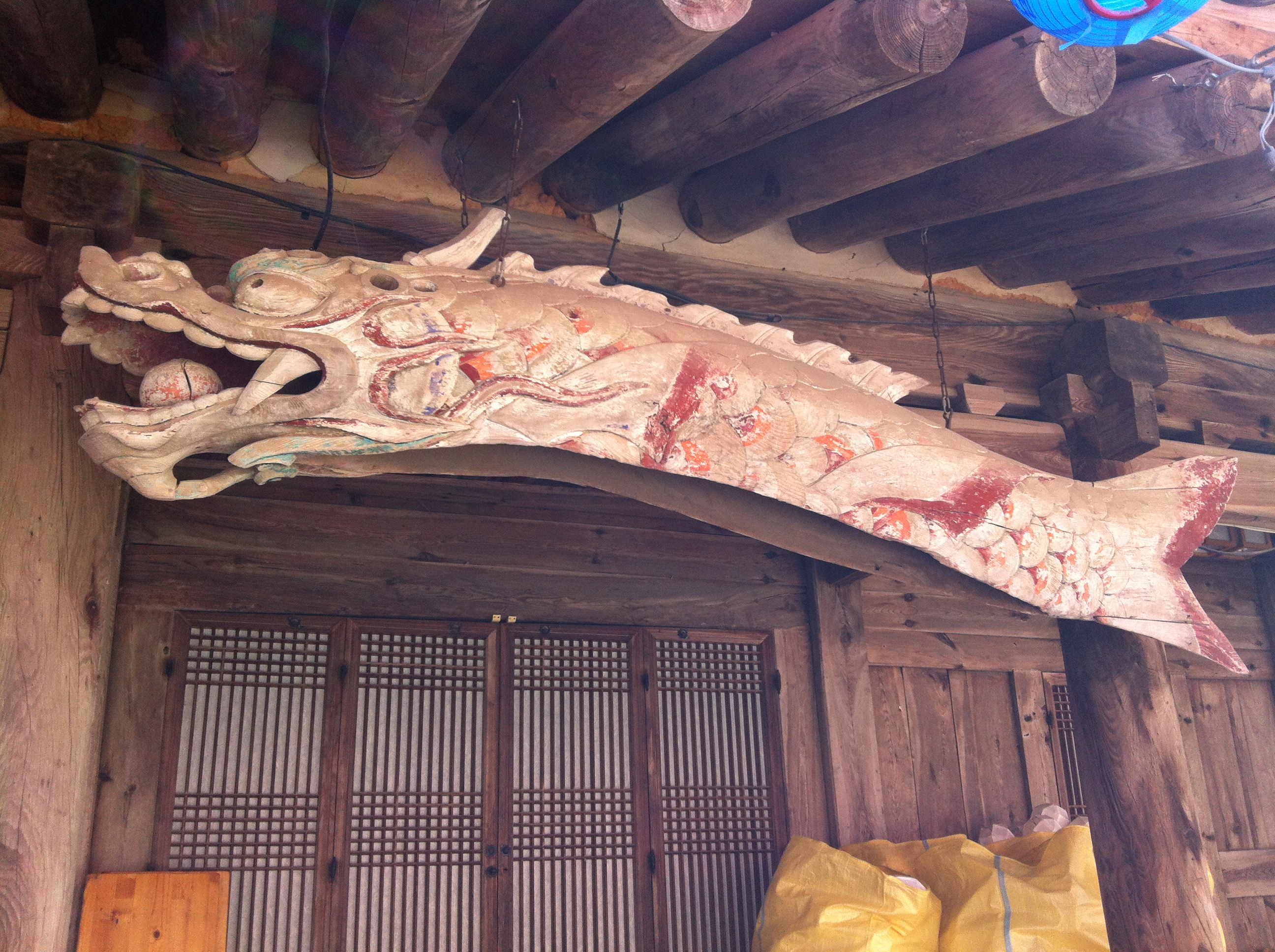
Mogeo at Bogwangsa in Paju, South Korea

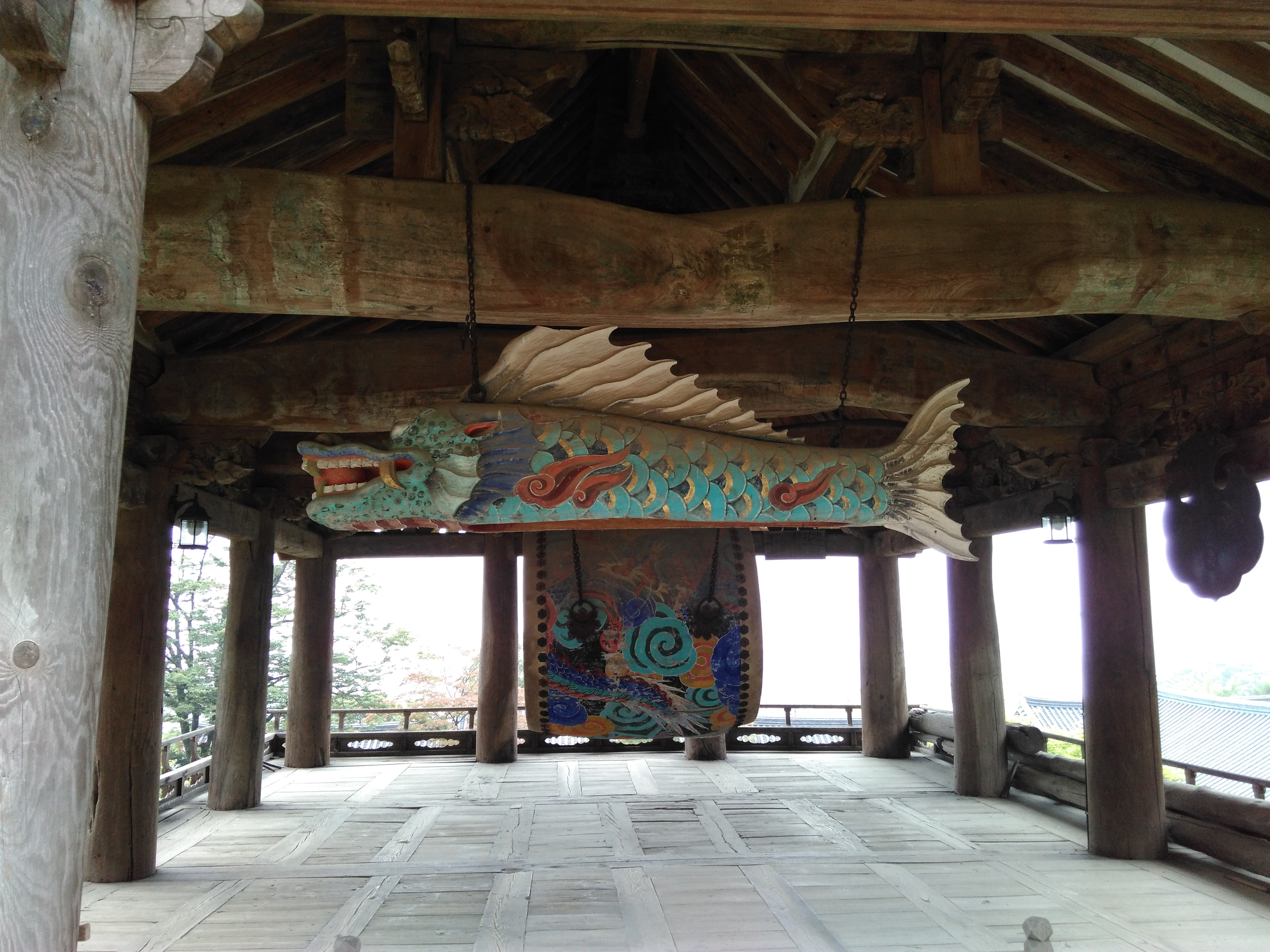
Mogeo on the bell tower at Buseoksa in Yeongju, South Korea

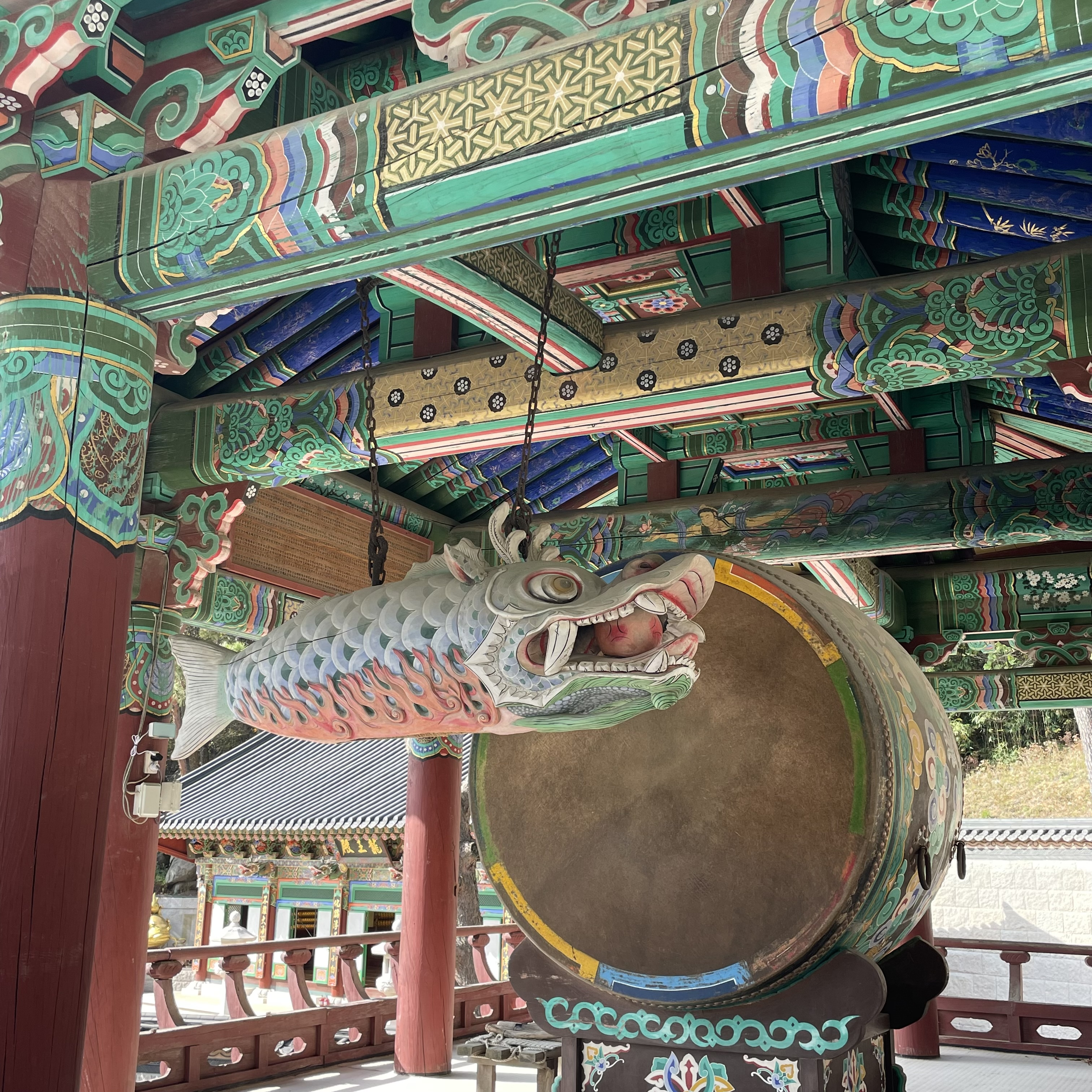
Mogeo at Bomunsa in Incheon, South Korea

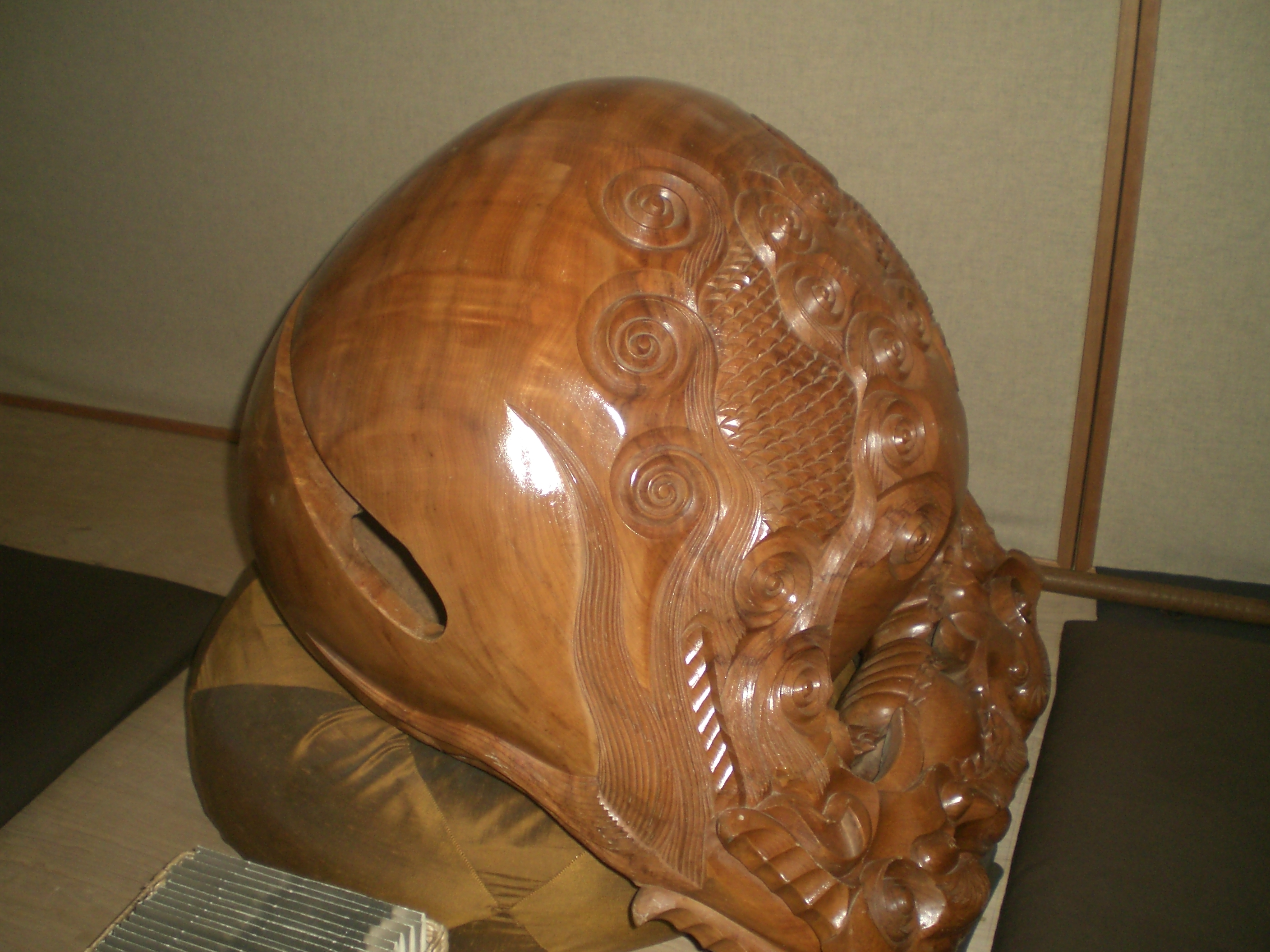
Intricate carvings on this huge mokugyo, over 3-foot (0.91 m) wide, at the Chapin Mill Zen Buddhist Retreat center in New York, USA.

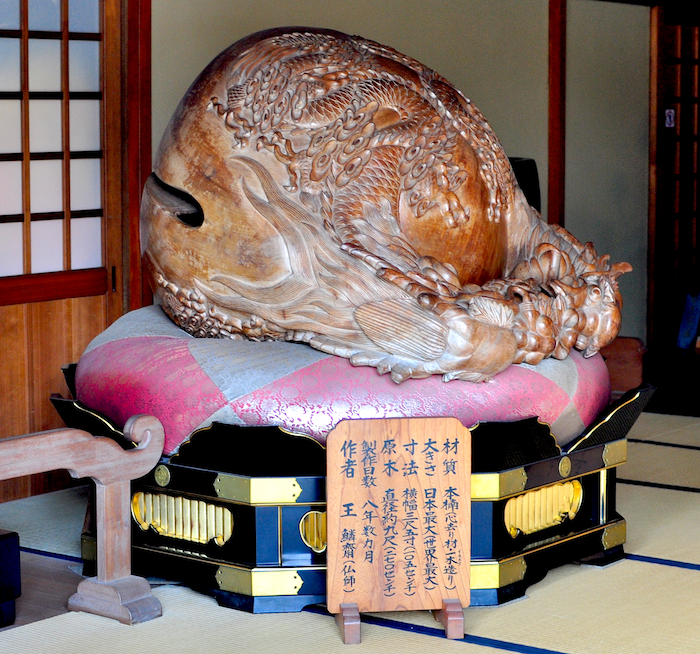
One of the largest wooden fish in the world, located at Hasedera in Kamakura, Japan

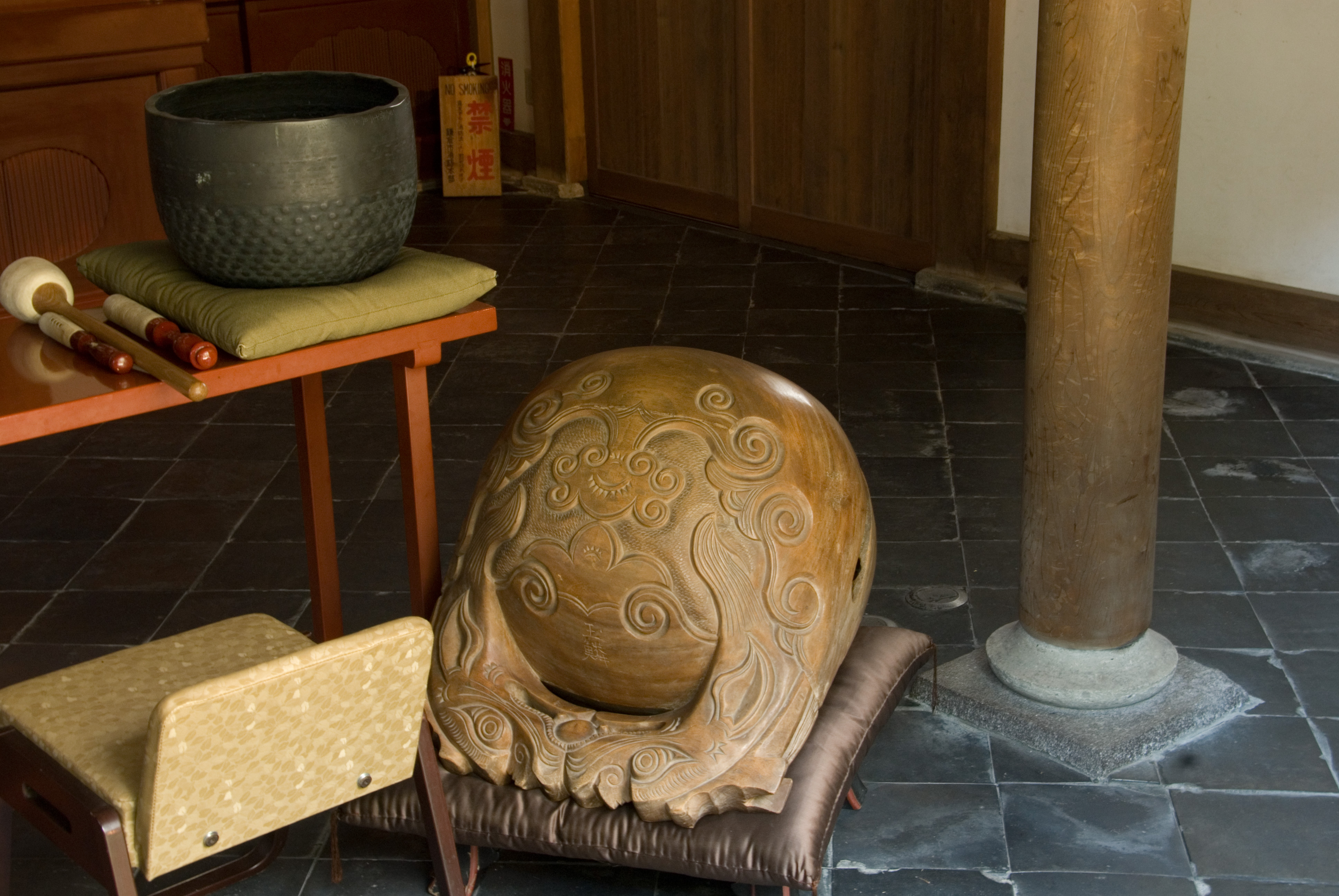
Mokugyo at Jōchi-ji in Kita-Kamakura, Japan.

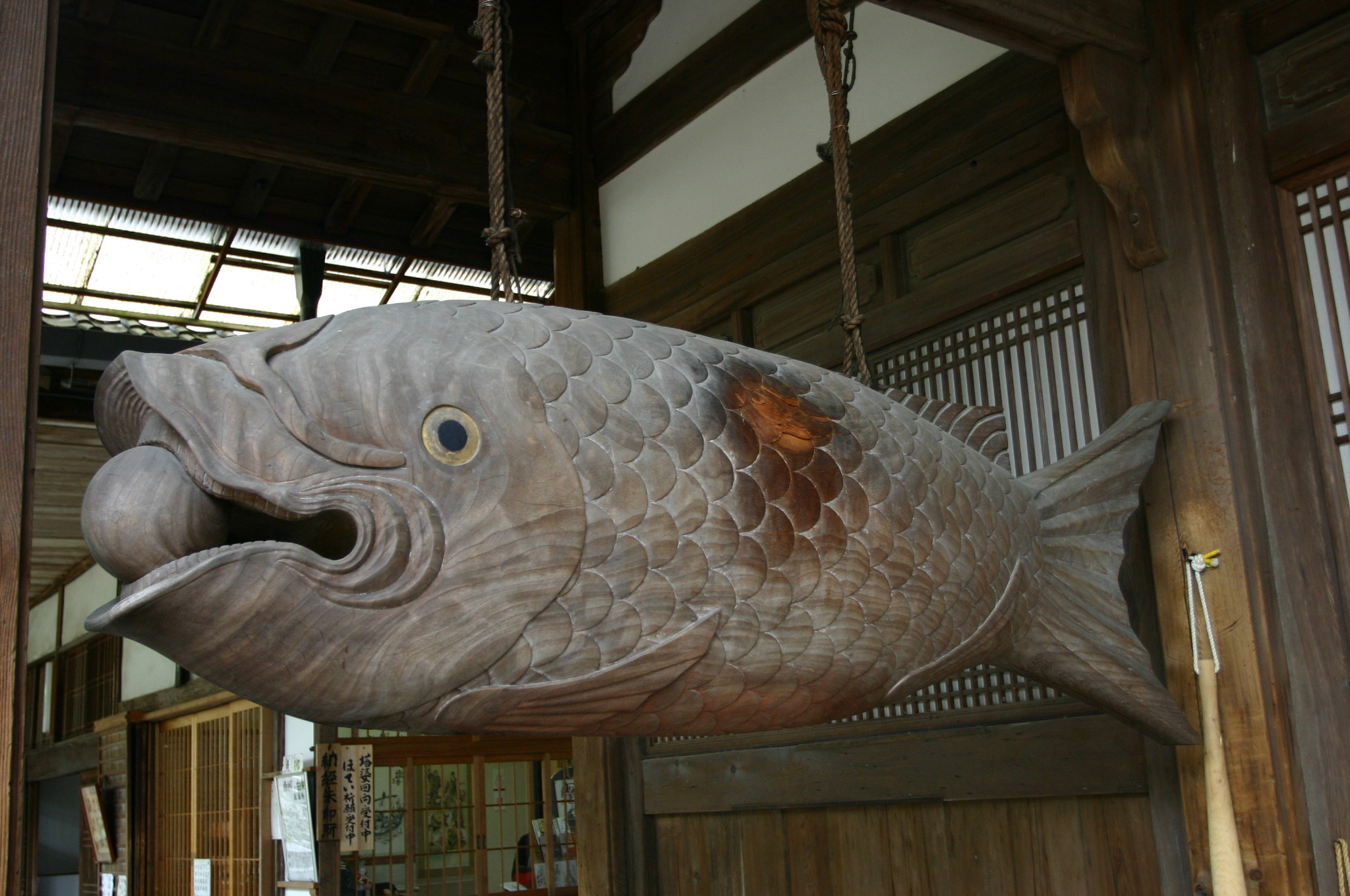
An original type of mokugyo at Manpuku-ji, Uji, Japan

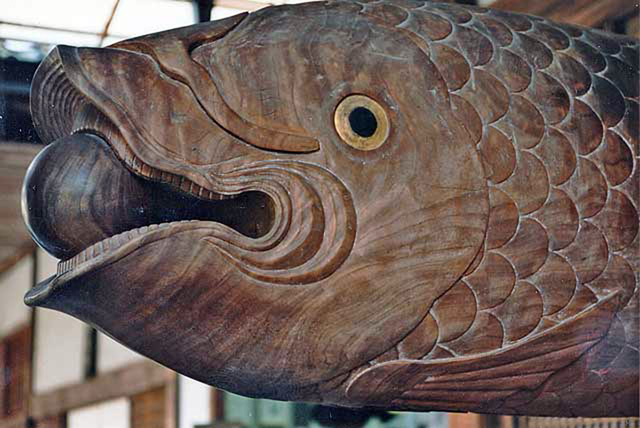
Head of the mokugyo at Manpuku-ji, Uji, Japan

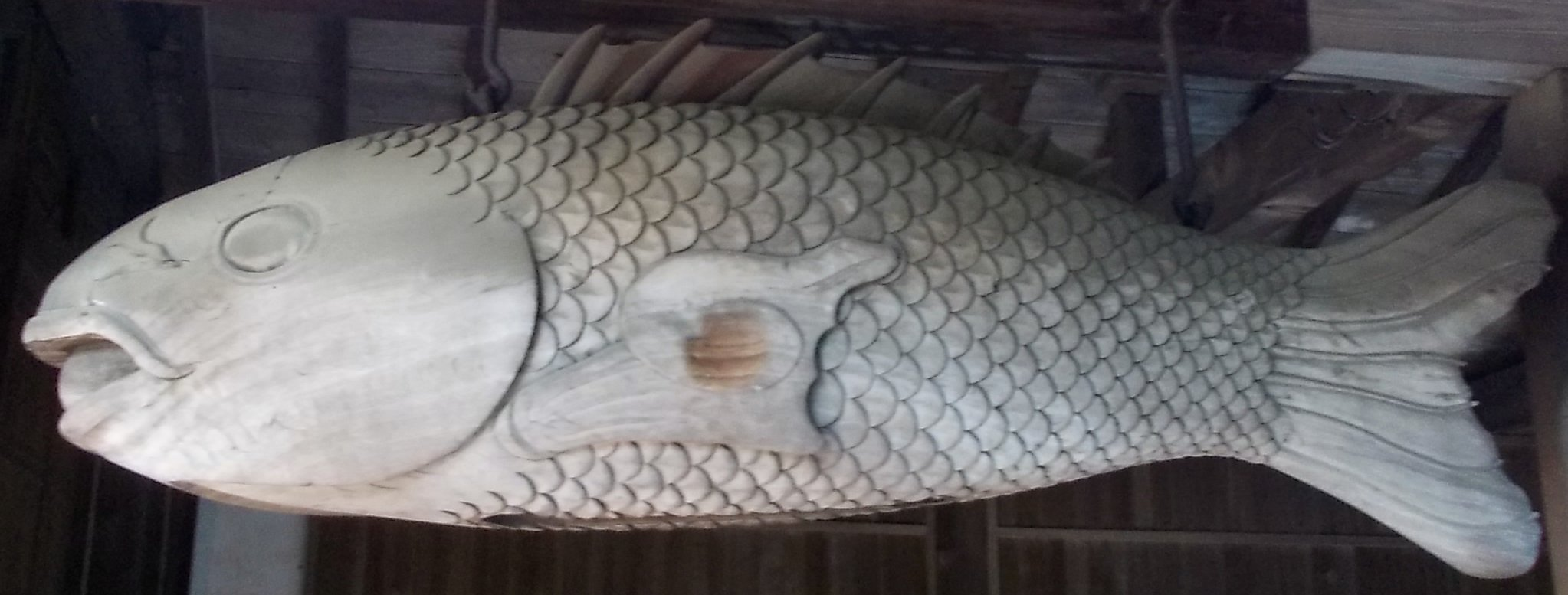
Mokugyo at Shōfuku-ji, Nagasaki, Japan

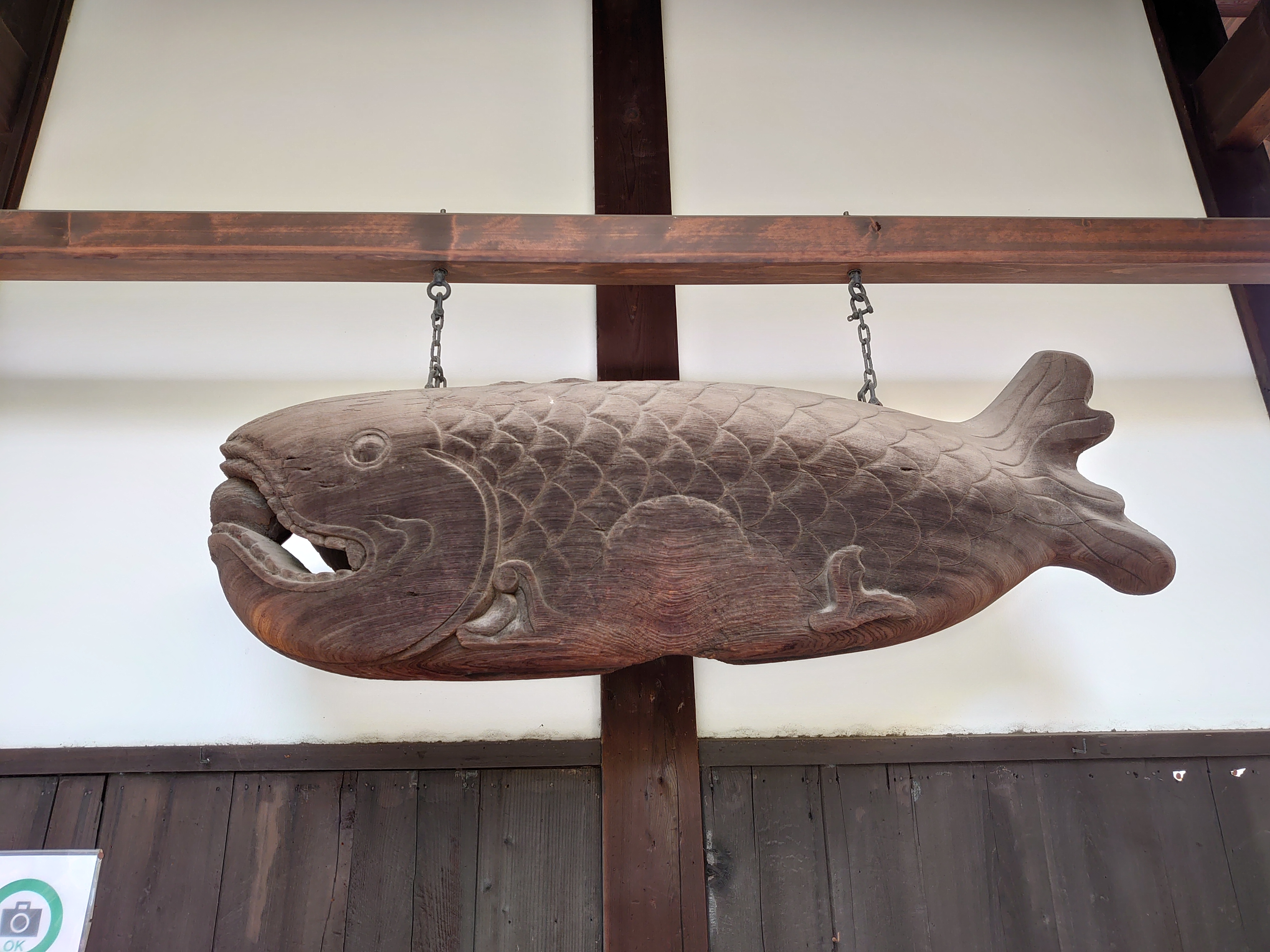
Mokugyo at Sharison-ji in Osaka, Japan.

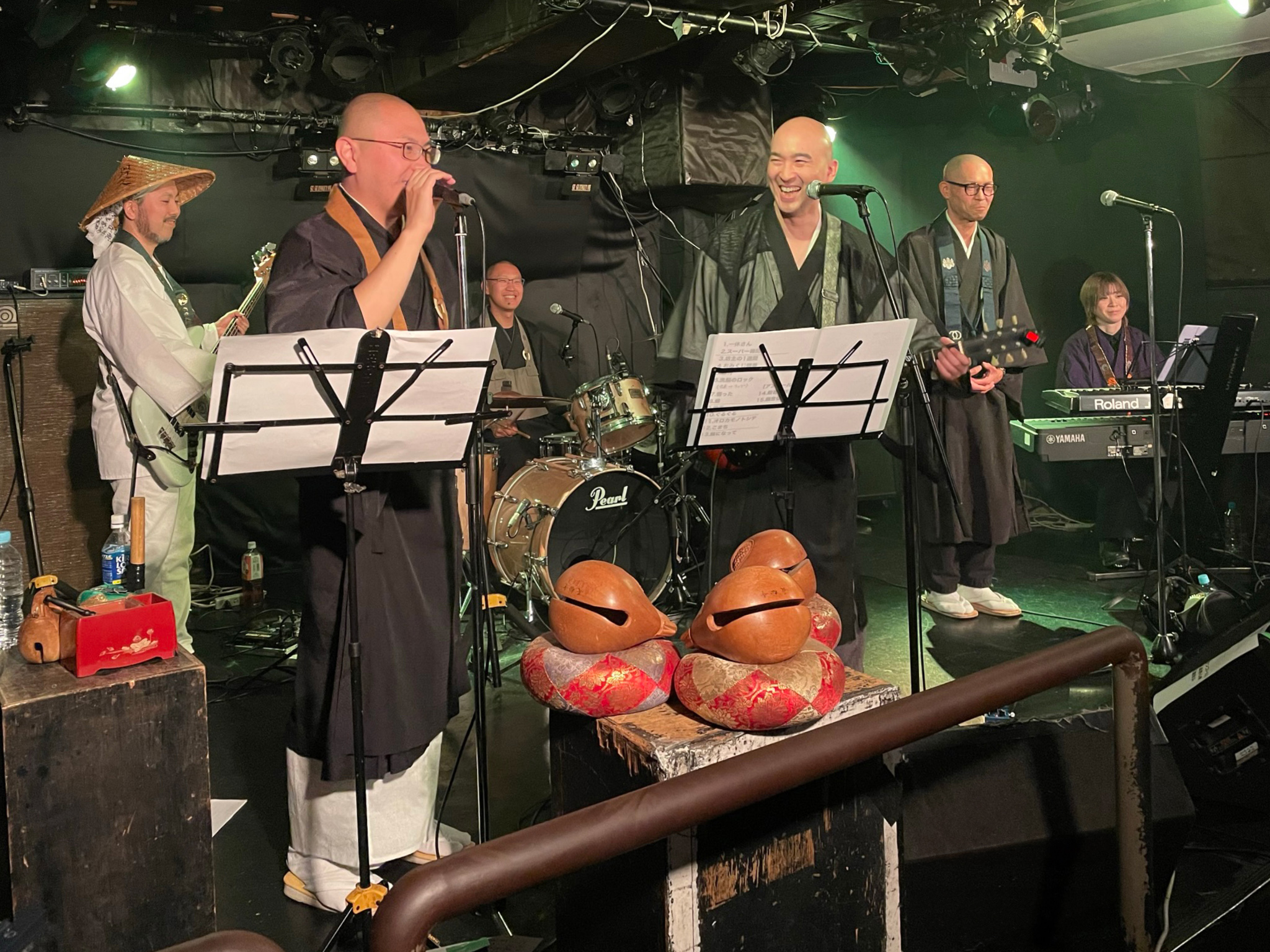
Mokugyos on stage, Yotsuya, Japan

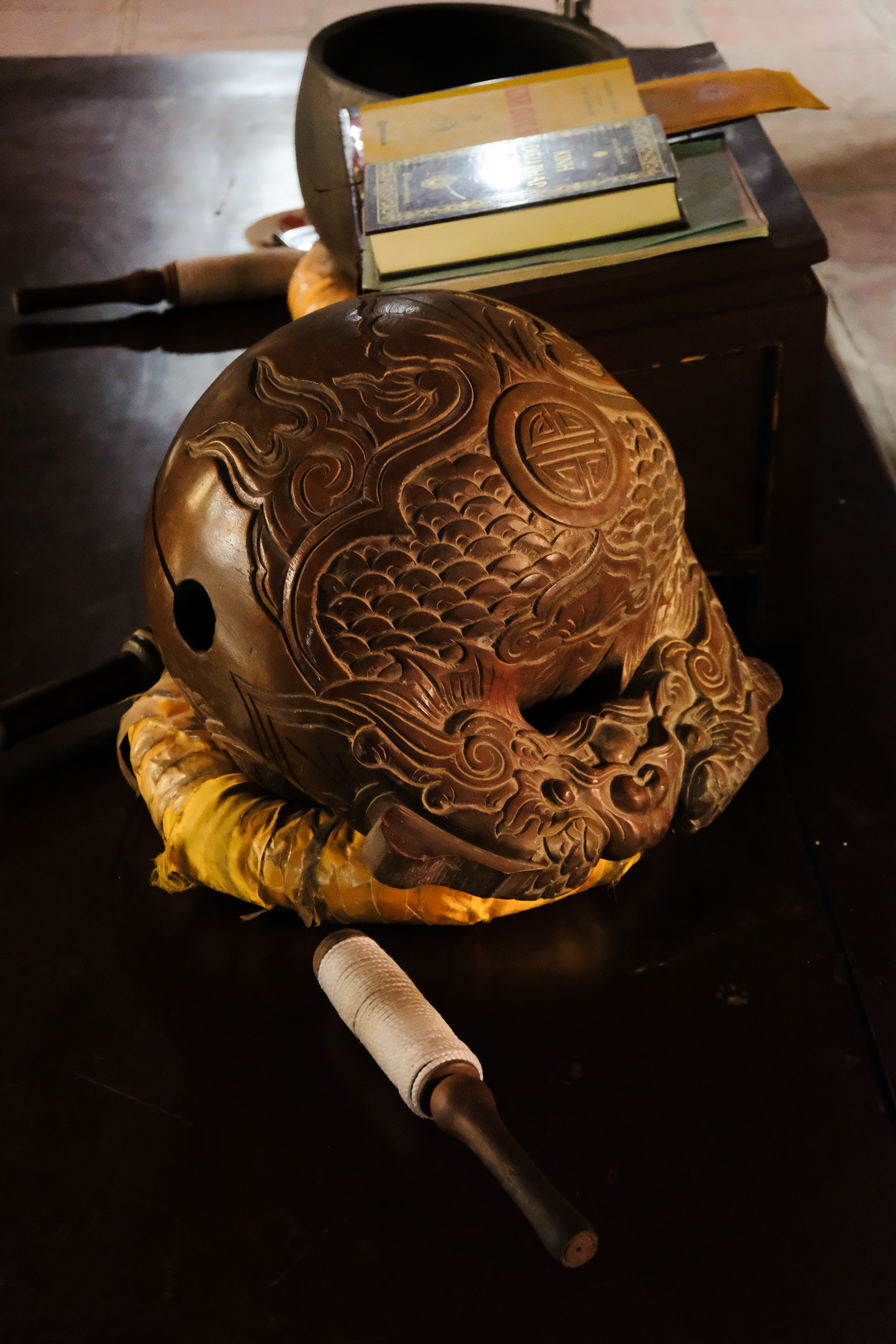
Mõ at Bút Tháp Temple, Bắc Ninh, Vietnam

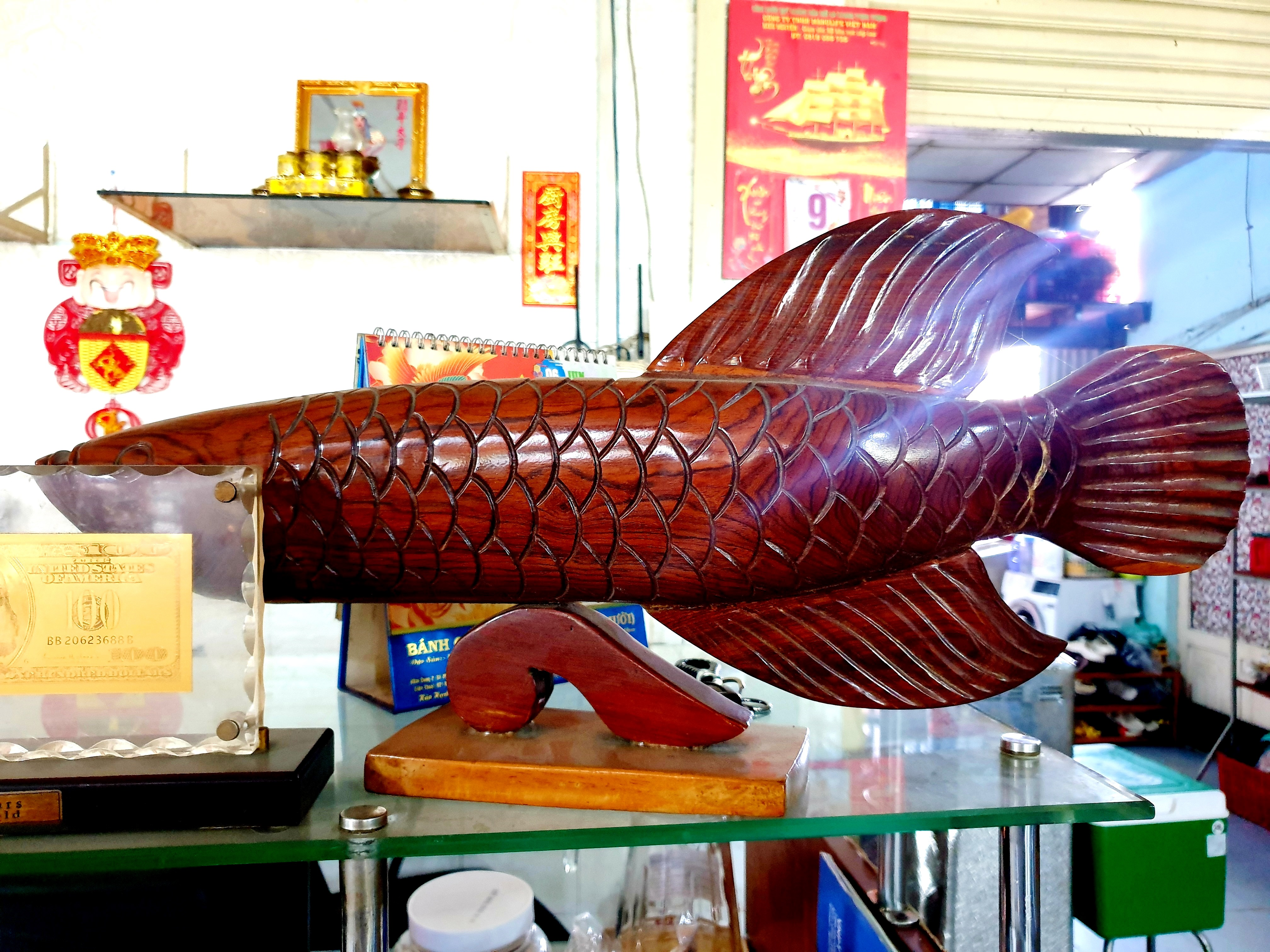
Wooden fish at a temple in Tây Ninh, Vietnam

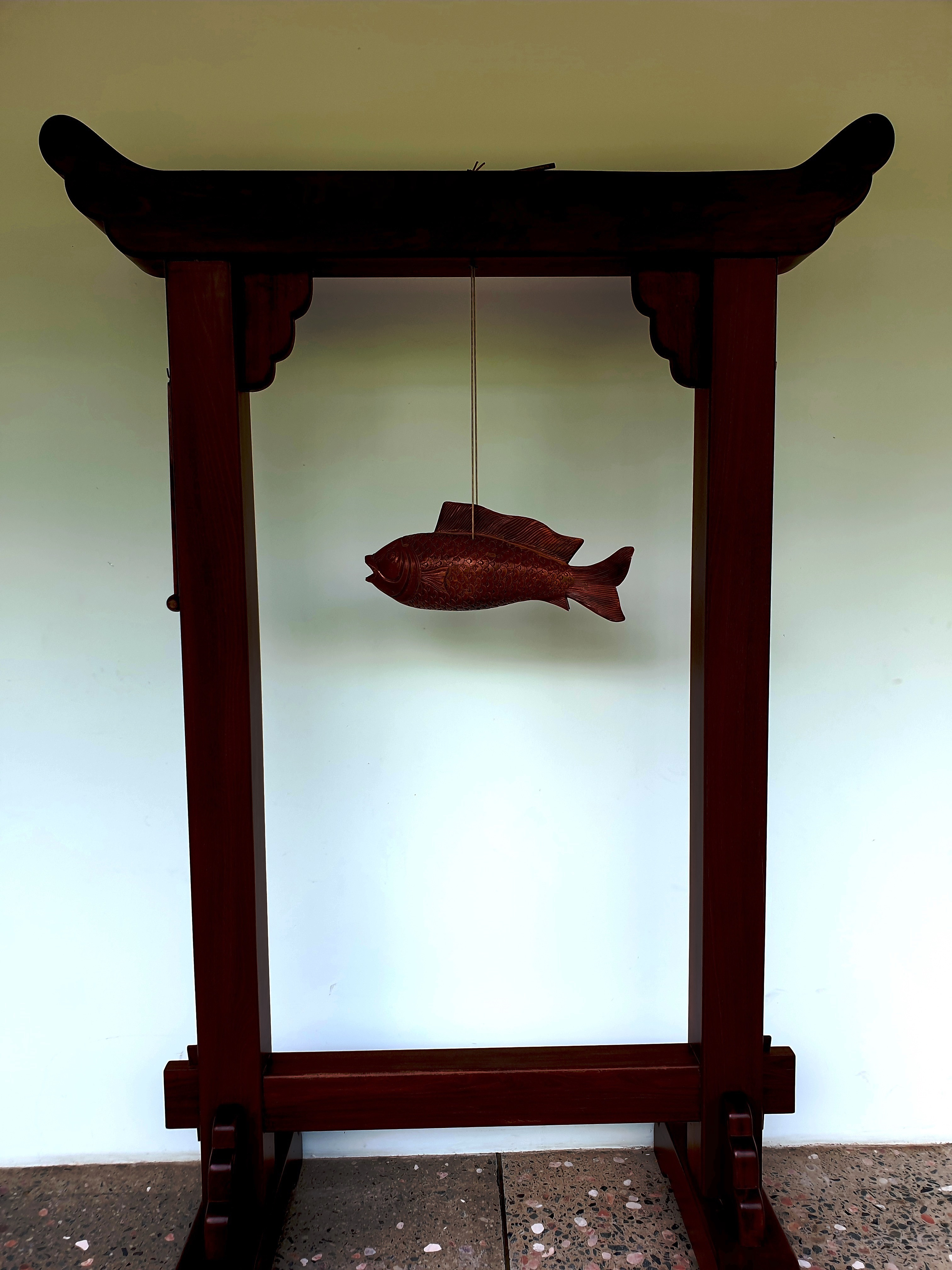
Mõ at Vĩnh Nghiêm Buddhist monastery, HCMC, Vietnam

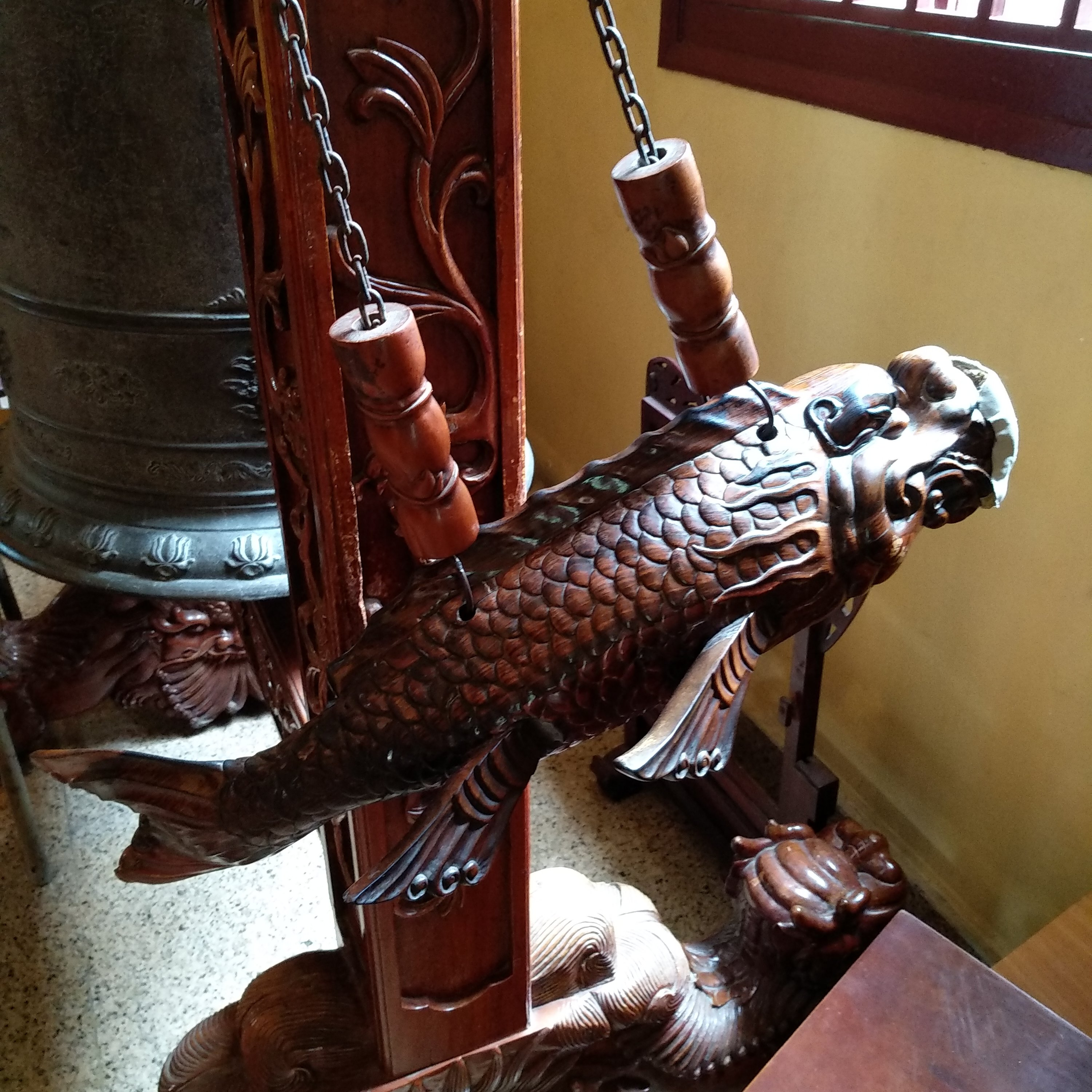
Mõ at Xá Lợi Temple, District 3, HCMC, Vietnam

== See also ==
- Fish drum
- Bell tower (wat)
- Drum tower (Chinese Buddhism)
- Drum tower (Asia)
