= Ningombam =

Meitei surname

Ningombam (also, Ningomba or Ningom) is a surname of the Meitei people. Notable people with this name are:

- Biju Ningombam, Indian actress
- Khui Ningomba (363 A.D. – 378 A.D.), King of Angom dynasty
- Ningombam Bupenda Meitei (born 1987), Indian writer
- Ningomba Engson Singh (born 2003), Indian footballer
