= Fish drum =

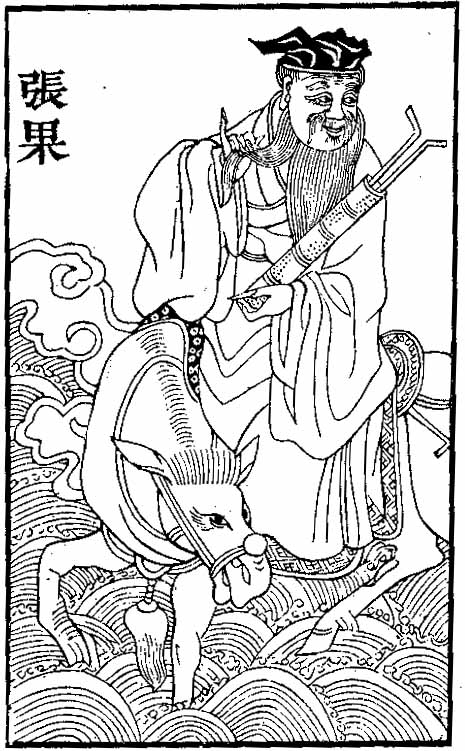
The Elder Zhang Guo holding a fish drum

The fish drum (simplified Chinese: 鱼鼓/渔鼓; traditional Chinese: 魚鼓/漁鼓; pinyin: yugu), also known as Daotong (道筒) or zhuqin (竹琴) is a Chinese percussion instrument. The name actually designates two rather different instruments, a membranophone and an idiophone.

== Membranophone ==
The membranophone fish drum is the symbol of Elder Zhang Guo, one of the Eight Immortals. This drum is a long and slender piece of bamboo with a dried fish skin stretched over one end. Two smaller pieces of bamboo resembling golf clubs are used as castanets.

== Idiophone ==
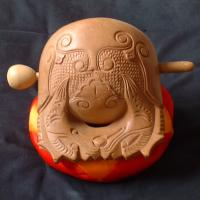
Wooden fish

There is also the idiophone, which is also called a wooden fish. This type of fish drum is used to accompany performers of changben or Chinese narrative ballads. They would accompany their singing on a yugu drum. It is also used as a drum to accompany Cantonese opera. This drum is an idiophone, where the whole body of the instrument vibrates to produce sound. It is a small piece of wood carved into the shape of a fish, with a slit along the length of the body. This drum is then struck by a mallet to produce sound. A much larger version, with much more ornate decoration, symbolizing a mythical fish, whose sounds is supposed to attract divinity, is used in Taoist and Confucian ceremonies. This version of the drum, also struck by a mallet, is hit at regular intervals during Confucian and Taoist ceremonies to mark the intervals of prayer. It is connected with the use of rain prayers and prayers connected to death rites.

== See also ==
Wooden fish
