= Zhang Guolao =

One of the Eight Taoist Immortals

Zhang Guolao 張果老
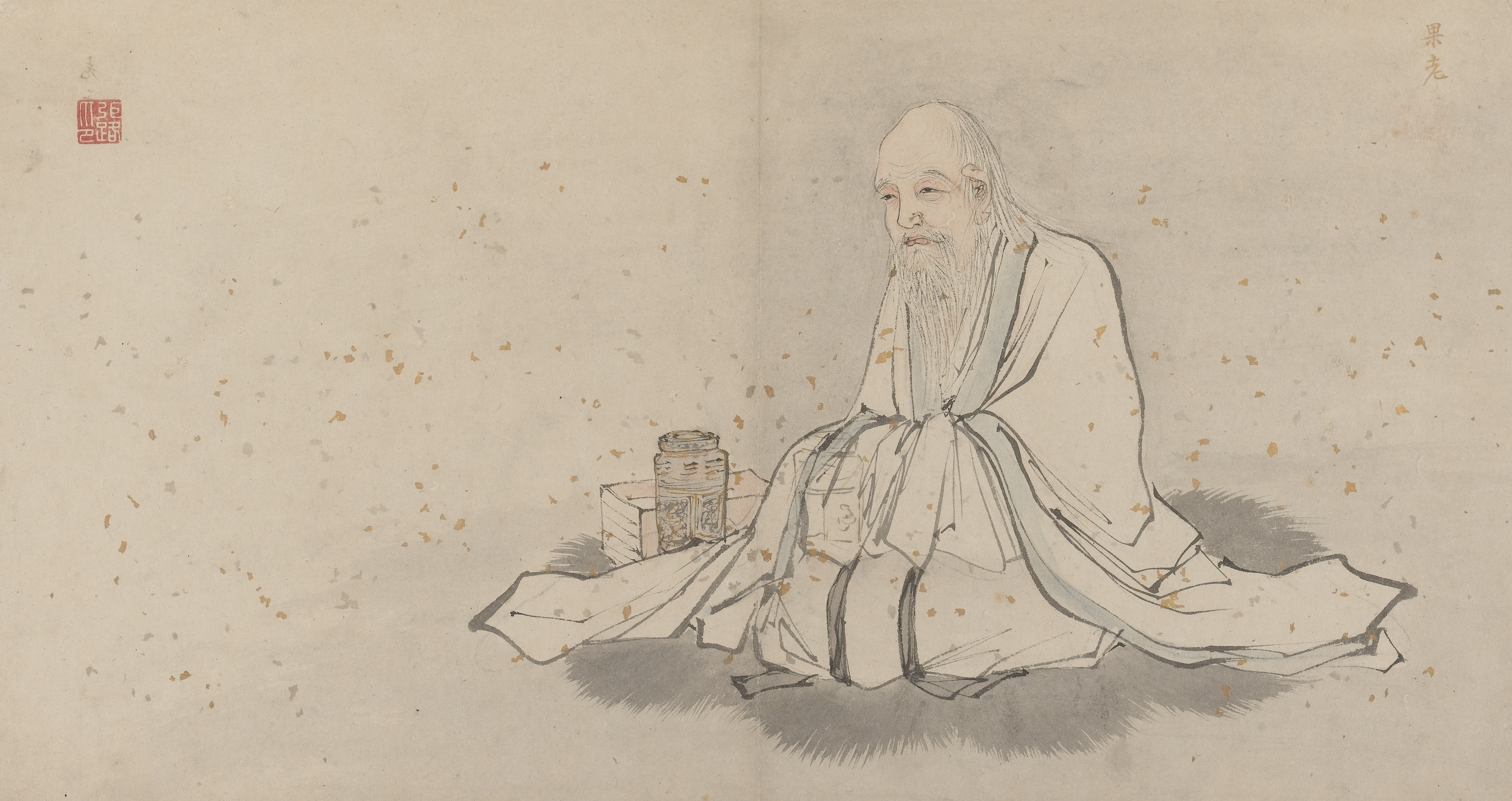
- Zhang Lu's painting of Zhang Guolao, early 16th century

Chinese name
- Traditional Chinese: 張果老
- Simplified Chinese: 张果老
- Literal meaning: Old Zhang Guo
Transcriptions
Standard Mandarin
- Hanyu Pinyin: Zhāng Guǒlǎo
- Wade–Giles: Chang Kuo-lao
Yue: Cantonese
- Yale Romanization: Jēung Gwó Lóuh
- Jyutping: Zoeng1 Gwo2 Lou5

Vietnamese name
- Vietnamese: Trương Quả Lão

Japanese name
- Kanji: 張果

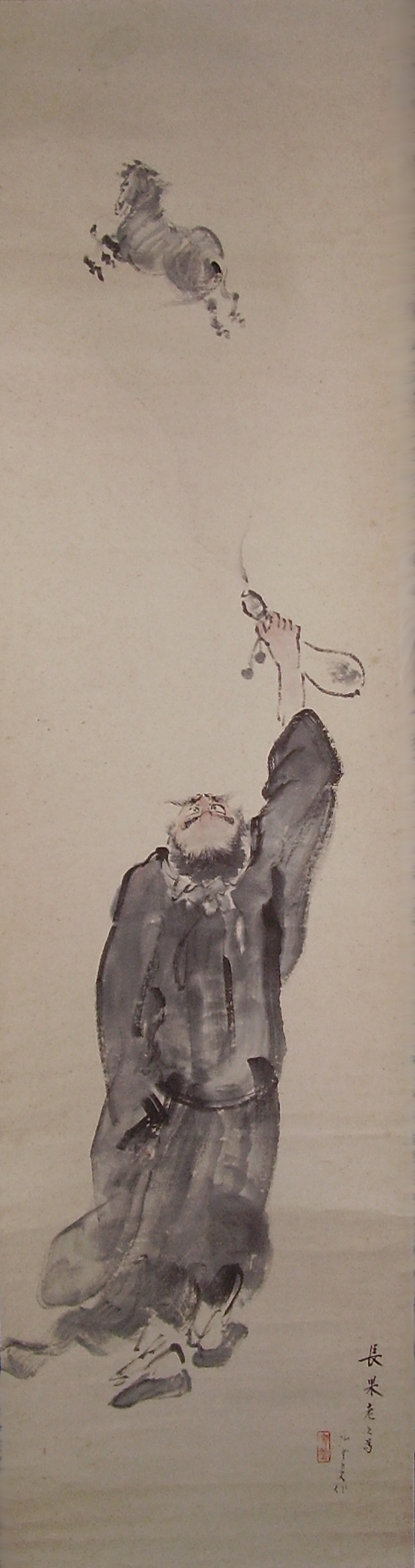
Zhang Guo Lao "decanting" his horse; Japanese painting, late 19th - early 20th century

Zhang Guo, better known as Zhang Guolao, is a Chinese mythological figure and one of the Eight Immortals in the Taoist pantheon. Among the Eight Immortals, Zhang Guolao, Zhongli Quan and Lü Yan are the only ones who appear in historical records as genuine figures in society at specific times and places. His existence is said to have begun around the middle or end of the 7th century, and ended approximately in the middle of the 8th. The epithet "Lao" added at the end of his name means "old".

== Life ==
Zhang was a Taoist fangshi (translated as "occultist-alchemist") who lived as a hermit on Zhongtiao Mountain (中條山; southeast of present-day Yongji, Shanxi) in Heng Prefecture during the Tang dynasty. By the time Wu Zetian came to power, he claimed to be several hundred years old. A strong believer in the magic of necromancy, he also declared that he was a Grand Minister to the mythical Emperor Yao in his previous life. Zhang also had a love for wine and winemaking. He was known to make liquor from herbs and shrubs as a hobby. Other members of the Eight Immortals drank his wine, which they believed to have healing or medicinal properties. He was also known to be a master of qigong and could go without food for days, surviving on only a few sips of wine.

Zhang was the most eccentric of the Eight Immortals, seen clearly in the style of Chinese martial arts dedicated to his memory. The style includes moves such as delivering a kick during a backflip or bending so far back that your shoulders touch the ground. He was known to be quite entertaining, often making himself invisible, drinking water from the petals of poisonous flowers, snatching birds in flight from the sky, as well as wilting flowers simply by pointing in their direction.

== Depiction in art and culture ==
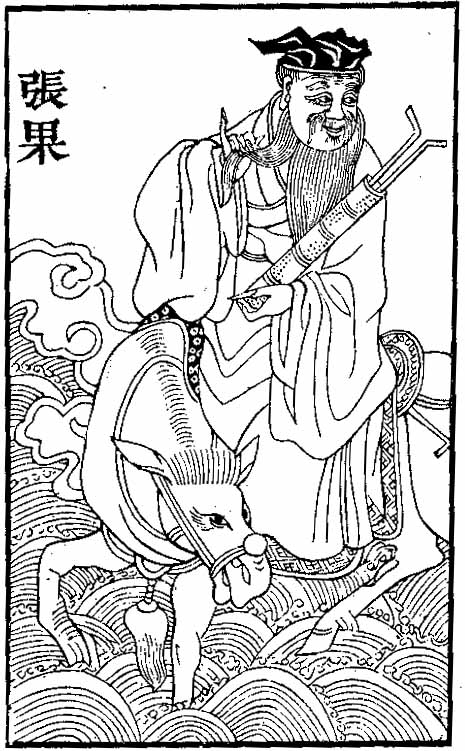
A woodcut of Zhang Guo, carrying a fish-drum.

Zhang appears frequently in Chinese paintings and sculpture, either with the Eight Immortals or alone, and, like the other immortals, can be seen in many different common artistic mediums and everyday objects. He is typically shown riding his white donkey, usually seated facing backwards. His emblem is a fish drum, which is a tube-shaped bamboo drum with two iron rods or mallets that he carries with him, or carrying a phoenix feather or a peach, representing immortality. Since he represents old age, in the Taoist fengshui tradition, a picture or statue of him can be placed in the home or bedroom of an elderly person to help bring them a long life and a good, natural death. A picture of him on his mule offering a descendant to a newly wed couple can also be found in Taoist nuptial chapels.

== Legends ==
Zhang was known for wandering between the Fen River and Qin territories during his lifetime and was known to travel at least a thousand li per day on a white donkey or mule. When his journey was finished, he folded his mule up and placed it in his pocket or a small box. When he wished to use the mule again, he poured water on it from his mouth and the mule regained its form.

The Tang dynasty emperors Taizong and Gaozong often invited Zhang to their imperial courts, but he always declined these invitations. Once, when asked by Wu Zetian, he finally agreed to leave his hermitage. As he reached the gate of the Temple of the Jealous Woman, he died suddenly. His body was seen decomposing and being consumed by worms, but he was later seen, alive and well, on Zhongtiao Mountain in Hengzhou.

In 735, during the reign of Emperor Xuanzong of the Tang dynasty, Zhang was called to Luoyang, where he was elected as the chief of the Imperial Academy, with the honorable title "Very Perspicacious Teacher." At this time, the Taoist Ye Fashan was highly favoured in the imperial court, thanks to his skill in necromancy. When asked who Zhang Guolao was, Ye replied, "I know, but if I were to tell your Majesty, I should fall dead at your feet, so I dare not speak unless your Majesty will promise that you will go barefooted and bareheaded to ask Zhang to forgive you, in which case I should immediately revive."

Having been promised by Emperor Xuanzong, Ye Fashan then said: "Zhang Guolao is a white spiritual bat which came out of primeval chaos." Zhang was believed by some to be able to transform himself into a bat, another symbol of permanence. After giving this information, Ye immediately dropped dead at the emperor's feet. Emperor Xuanzong, with bald head and feet, went to Zhang as he had promised. After the emperor begged Zhang for forgiveness for his indiscretion, Zhang then sprinkled water on Ye's face, and he revived. Soon after, between 742 and 746, Zhang fell ill and returned to die on Zhongtiao Mountain in Hengzhou. When his apprentices opened his tomb, they found it empty.

== Modern depiction ==
In the television show Jackie Chan Adventures, Zhang Guolao is the Immortal who sealed away Po Kong, The Mountain Demon. He is depicted as a white-haired old man with a long, flowing beard and a topknot.

== See also ==
- Chinese alcoholic beverages
