= Pisatao =

God in Meitei mythology

- God of architecture, artisans, forge, handicrafts, metallurgy, skills
- Member of Lainingthous
- Other names: Khoyum Lai Ningthou Pishatao Khutheiba Silheiba
- Affiliation: Meitei mythology (Manipuri mythology) and Meitei religion (Sanamahism)
- Major cult center: Kangla
- Abode: Heaven
- Weapons: Hammer and chisel
- Texts: Puyas
- Gender: Male
- Region: Manipur
- Ethnic group: Meitei
- Festivals: Pisatao Khurumba

Equivalents
- Greek: Hephaestus
- Hindu: Vishvakarma
- Roman: Vulcan

Lainingthou Pishatao (Meitei: ꯂꯥꯢꯅꯤꯡꯊꯧ ꯄꯤꯁꯥꯇꯥꯎ, romanized: lāinīngthou pīsātāo, lit. 'maker of all'), mononymously known as Pisatao (Old Manipuri: ꯄꯤꯁꯥꯇꯥꯎ), is a primordial deity in Meitei mythology and religion. He is the god of craftsmen and architects. He is regarded as the divine personification of the ultimate reality, the abstract creative power inherent in deities, living and non living beings in the universe. He is one of the divine manifestations of Supreme God Atingkok (Tengbanba Mapu). In many legends, he is one of the four Gods who control the four directions.

Historically, his pantheon was replaced by Vishwakarma of Hinduism. However, with the dedicated efforts of several organizations and associations including the "South East Asia Cultural Organisation" (SEACO), the status of his pantheon is reviving day by day in Manipur.
