= Thokchom Santosh Singh =

Indian cricketer (born 1992)

Santosh Singh
Personal information
- Full name: Thokchom Santosh Singh
- Born: 5 October 1992 (age 34); Imphal, Manipur
- Batting: Right handed

Domestic team information
- Years: Team
- 2018–19: Manipur
- Source: Cricinfo, 28 November 2018

Thokchom Santosh Singh (born 5 October 1992) is an Indian cricketer. He made his first-class debut for Manipur in the 2018–19 Ranji Trophy on 28 November 2018.
